= Italian diaspora =

Italian people and their descendants living outside Italy

Emigrazione italiana (Italian)
- Map of the Italian diaspora in the world

Total population
- c. 80 million worldwide

Regions with significant populations
- Brazil, Argentina, United States, France, Colombia, Canada, Peru, Mexico, Uruguay, Paraguay, Venezuela, Germany, Switzerland, United Kingdom, Belgium, Chile and Australia

Languages
- Italian, other languages of Italy, English, French, Spanish, Portuguese and German

Religion
- Christianity (predominantly Catholicism)

Related ethnic groups
- European diaspora, Italians

The Italian diaspora (Italian: emigrazione italiana, pronounced [emiɡratˈtsjoːne itaˈljaːna], lit. 'Italian emigration') is the large-scale emigration of Italians from Italy.

There were various major Italian diasporas in Italian history. The first diaspora began around 1880 and ended in the 1920s to the early 1940s with the rise of Fascist Italy. Poverty was the main reason for emigration, specifically the lack of land as mezzadria sharecropping flourished in Italy, especially in the South, and property became subdivided over generations. Especially in Southern Italy, conditions were harsh. From the 1860s to the 1950s, Italy was still a largely rural society with many small towns and cities having almost no modern industry and in which land management practices, especially in the South and the Northeast, did not easily convince farmers to stay on the land and to work the soil. Another factor was related to the overpopulation of Italy as a result of the improvements in socioeconomic conditions after Unification. That created a demographic boom and forced the new generations to emigrate en masse in the late 19th century and the early 20th century, mostly to the Americas. The new migration of capital created millions of unskilled jobs around the world and was responsible for the simultaneous mass migration of Italians searching for "bread and work" (Italian: pane e lavoro, pronounced [ˈpaːne e llaˈvoːro]).

The second diaspora started after the end of World War II and concluded roughly in the 1970s. Between 1880 and 1980, about 15,000,000 Italians left the country permanently. By 1980, it was estimated that about 25,000,000 Italians were residing outside Italy. Between 1861 and 1985, 29,036,000 Italians emigrated to other countries, of whom 16,000,000 (55%) arrived before the outbreak of World War I. About 10,275,000 returned to Italy (35%), and 18,761,000 permanently settled abroad (65%).

There are over 5 million Italian citizens living outside Italy, and c. 80 million people around the world claim full or partial Italian ancestry. The descendants of Italian emigrants are called "Italian oriundi" or "Italo-descendants" (such as Italo-Americans, Italo-Argentines, Italo-Brazilians, etc.) and they are estimated to be 80 million. Today there is the National Museum of Italian Emigration (Italian: Museo Nazionale dell'Emigrazione Italiana, "MEI"), located in Genoa, Italy. The exhibition space, which is spread over three floors and 16 thematic areas, describes the phenomenon of Italian emigration from before the unification of Italy to the present. The museum describes the Italian emigration through autobiographies, diaries, letters, photographs and newspaper articles of the time that dealt with the theme of Italian emigration.

== Background of ancient Italian migrations ==
Italica was the first Roman settlement in Spain. It was founded in 206 BC by Roman general Scipio as a colonia for his Italic veterans and named after them. Italica later grew attracting new migrants from the Italian peninsula and also with the children of Roman soldiers and native women. Roman emperors Trajan and Hadrian were born in Italica.

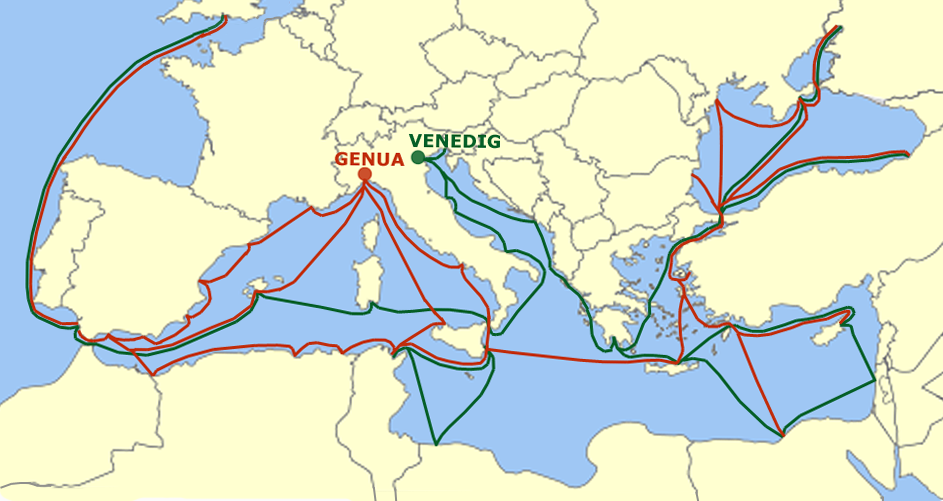
Trade routes and colonies of the Genoese (red) and Venetian (green) empires during the Middle Age

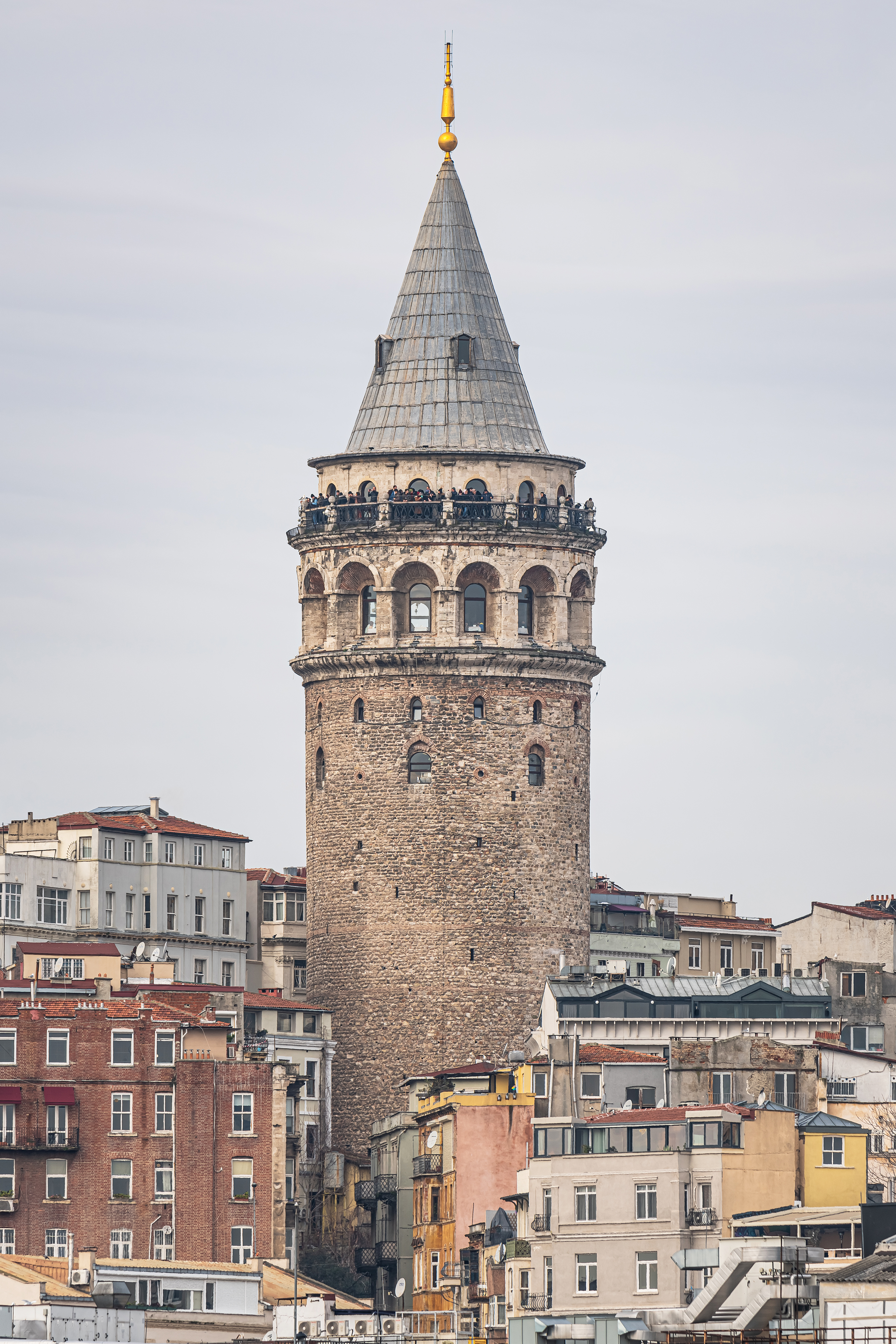
The Galata Tower in Istanbul, Turkey, built in 1348 by the Republic of Genoa and still a symbol of the Italian Levantine

Italian Levantines are people living mainly in Turkey, who are descendants from Genoese and Venetian colonists in the Levant during the Middle Ages Italian Levantines have roots even in the eastern Mediterranean coast (the Levant, particularly in present-day Lebanon and Israel) since the period of the Crusades and the Byzantine empire. A small group came from Crimea and the Genoese colonies in the Black Sea, after the Fall of Constantinople in 1453. The majority of the Italian Levantine in modern Turkey are descendants of traders and colonists from the maritime republics of the Mediterranean (such as the Republic of Venice, the Republic of Genoa and the Republic of Pisa or of the inhabitants of the Crusader states). There are two big communities of Italian Levantines: one in Istanbul and the other in İzmir. At the end of the 19th century there were nearly 6,000 Levantines of Italian roots in İzmir. They came mainly from the Genoese island of Chios. The community reached more than 15,000 members during Ataturk's times, but now is reduced to a few hundred, according to Italian Levantine writer Giovanni Scognamillo.

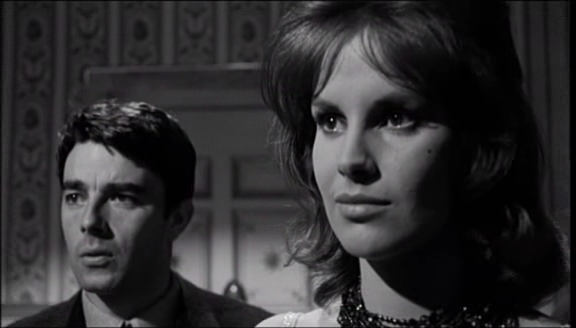
The Italian Lebanese actress Antonella Lualdi in a scene from the film Silver Spoon Set (1960)

Italians in Lebanon (or Italian Lebanese) are a community in Lebanon. Between the 12th and 15th centuries, the Italian Republic of Genoa had some Genoese colonies in Beirut, Tripoli, and Byblos. In more recent times, the Italians came to Lebanon in small groups during World War I and World War II, trying to escape the wars at that time in Europe. Some of the first Italians who chose Lebanon as a place to settle and find refuge were Italian soldiers from the Italo-Turkish War from 1911 to 1912. Most of the Italians chose to settle in Beirut because of its European style of life. Few Italians left Lebanon for France after independence. The Italian community in Lebanon is very small (about 4,300 people) and it is mostly assimilated into the Lebanese Catholic community. There is a growing interest in economic relationships between Italy and Lebanon (like with the "Vinifest 2011").

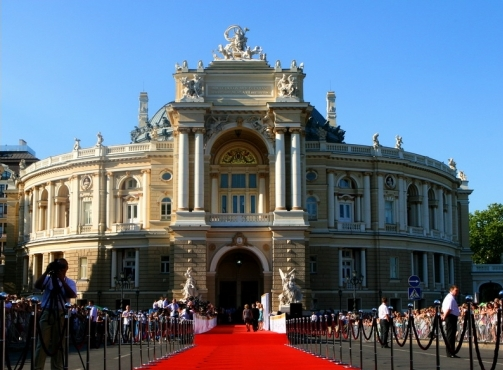
The Odesa Opera and Ballet Theatre, Ukraine. It was started with the important contribution of the Italians of Odesa

Italians of Odesa are mentioned for the first time in documents of the 13th century. The influx of Italians in southern Ukraine grew particularly with the foundation of Odesa, which took place in 1794. In 1797 there were about 800 Italians in Odesa, equal to 10% of the total population. For more than a century the Italians of Odesa greatly influenced the culture, art, industry, society, architecture, politics and economy of the city. Among the works created by the Italians of Odesa there were the Potemkin Stairs and the Odesa Opera and Ballet Theater. At the beginning of the 19th century the Italian language became the second official language in Odesa, after Russian. Until the 1870s, Odesa's Italian population grew steadily. From the following decade this growth stopped, and the decline of the Italian community in Odesa began. The reason was mainly one, namely the gradual integration into the Slavic population of Odesa, i.e. Russians and Ukrainians. Surnames began to be Russianized and Ukrainianized. The revolution of 1917 sent many of them to Italy, or to other cities in Europe. In Soviet times, only a few dozen Italians remained in Odesa, most of whom no longer knew their own language. Over time they merged with the local population, losing the ethnic connotations of origin. They disappeared completely by World War II.

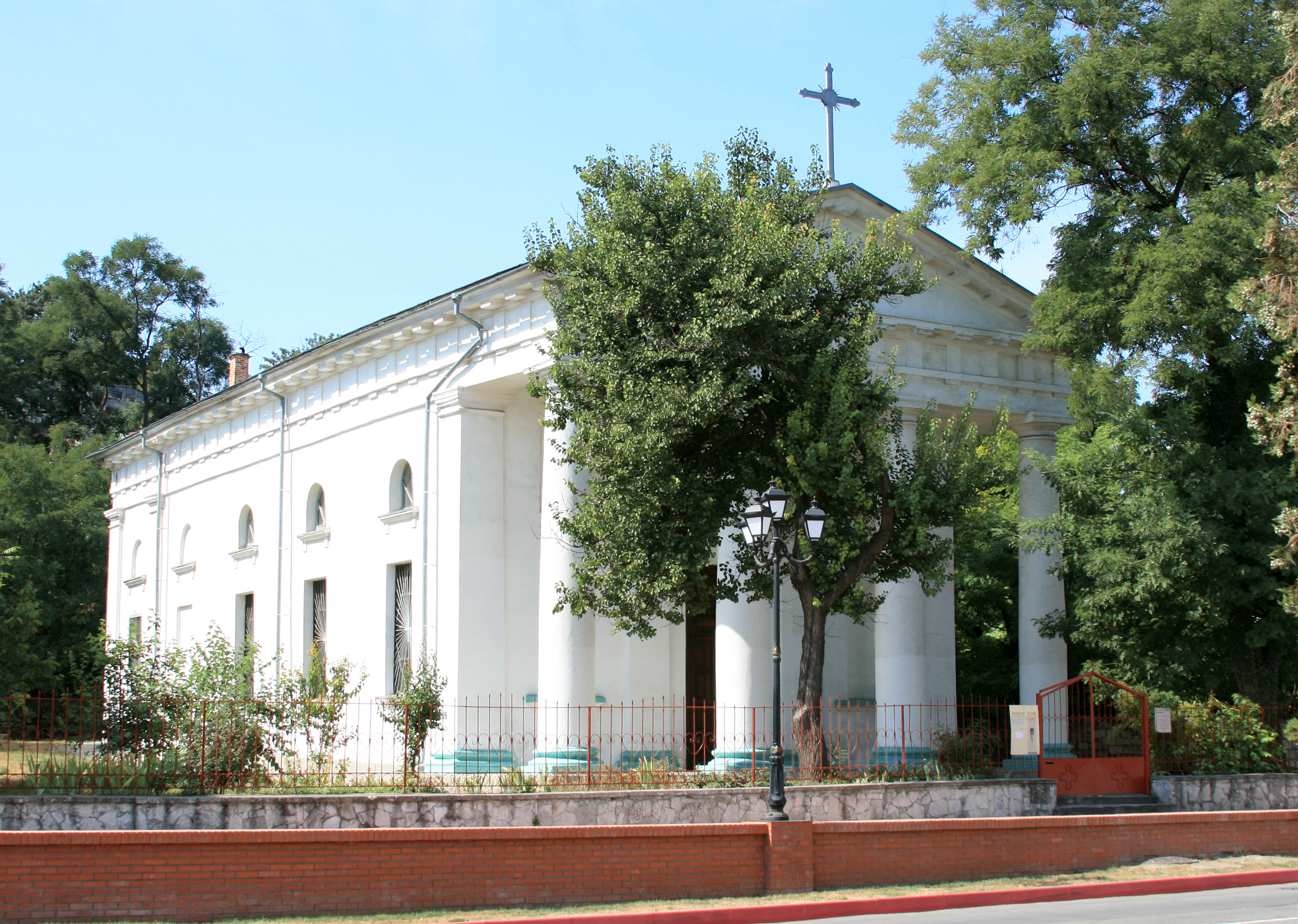
Catholic Church of Santa Maria Assunta in Kerch, Ukraine, reference for the Italians of Crimea

The Italians of Crimea are a small ethnic minority residing in Crimea. Italians have populated some areas of Crimea since the time of the Republic of Genoa and the Republic of Venice. In 1783, 25,000 Italians immigrated to Crimea, which had been recently annexed by the Russian Empire. In 1830 and in 1870, two distinct migrations arrived in Kerch from the cities of Trani, Bisceglie and Molfetta. These migrants were peasants and sailors, attracted by the job opportunities in the local Crimean seaports and by the possibility to cultivate the nearly unexploited and fertile Crimean lands. After the October Revolution, many Italians were considered foreigners and were seen as an enemy. They therefore faced much repression. Between 1936 and 1938, during Stalin's Great Purge, many Italians were accused of espionage and were arrested, tortured, deported or executed. The few survivors were allowed to return to Kerch under Nikita Khrushchev's regency. Some families dispersed in other territories of Soviet Union, mainly in Kazakhstan and Uzbekistan. The descendants of the Italians of Crimea account today for 3,000 people, mainly residing in Kerch.

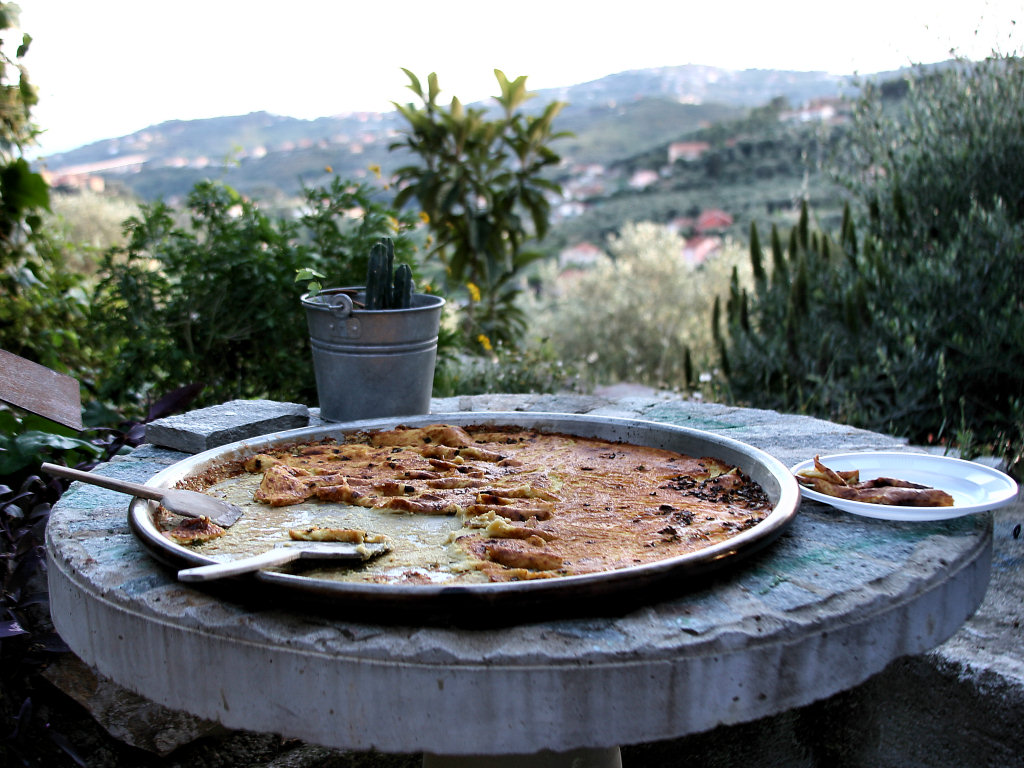
Gibraltarian Calentita is very similar to the Genoese Farinata. Genoese community in Gibraltar influenced the Gibraltarian cuisine

A Genoese community has existed in Gibraltar since the 16th century and later became an important part of the population. There is much evidence of a community of emigrants from Genoa, who moved to Gibraltar in the 16th century and that were more than a third of the Gibraltar population in the first half of the 18th century. Although labeled as "Genoese", they were not only from the city of Genoa but from all of Liguria, a region in Northern Italy that was the center of the maritime Republic of Genoa. According to the 1725 census, on a total civilian population of 1,113 there were 414 Genoese, 400 Spaniards, 137 Jews, 113 Britons and 49 others (mainly Portuguese and Dutch). In the 1753 census, the Genoese were the biggest group (nearly 34%) of civilian residents in the Gibraltar, and up until 1830, Italian was spoken together with English and Spanish and used in official announcements. After Napoleonic times, many Sicilians and some Tuscans migrated to Gibraltar, but the Genoese and Ligurians remained the majority of the Italian group. Indeed, the Genoese dialect was spoken in Catalan Bay well into the 20th century, dying out in the 1970s. Today, the descendants of the Genoese community of Gibraltar consider themselves Gibraltarians and most of them promote the autonomy of Gibraltar. Genoese heritage is evident throughout Gibraltar but especially in the architecture of the town's older buildings which are influenced by traditional Genoese housing styles featuring internal courtyards (also known as "patios").

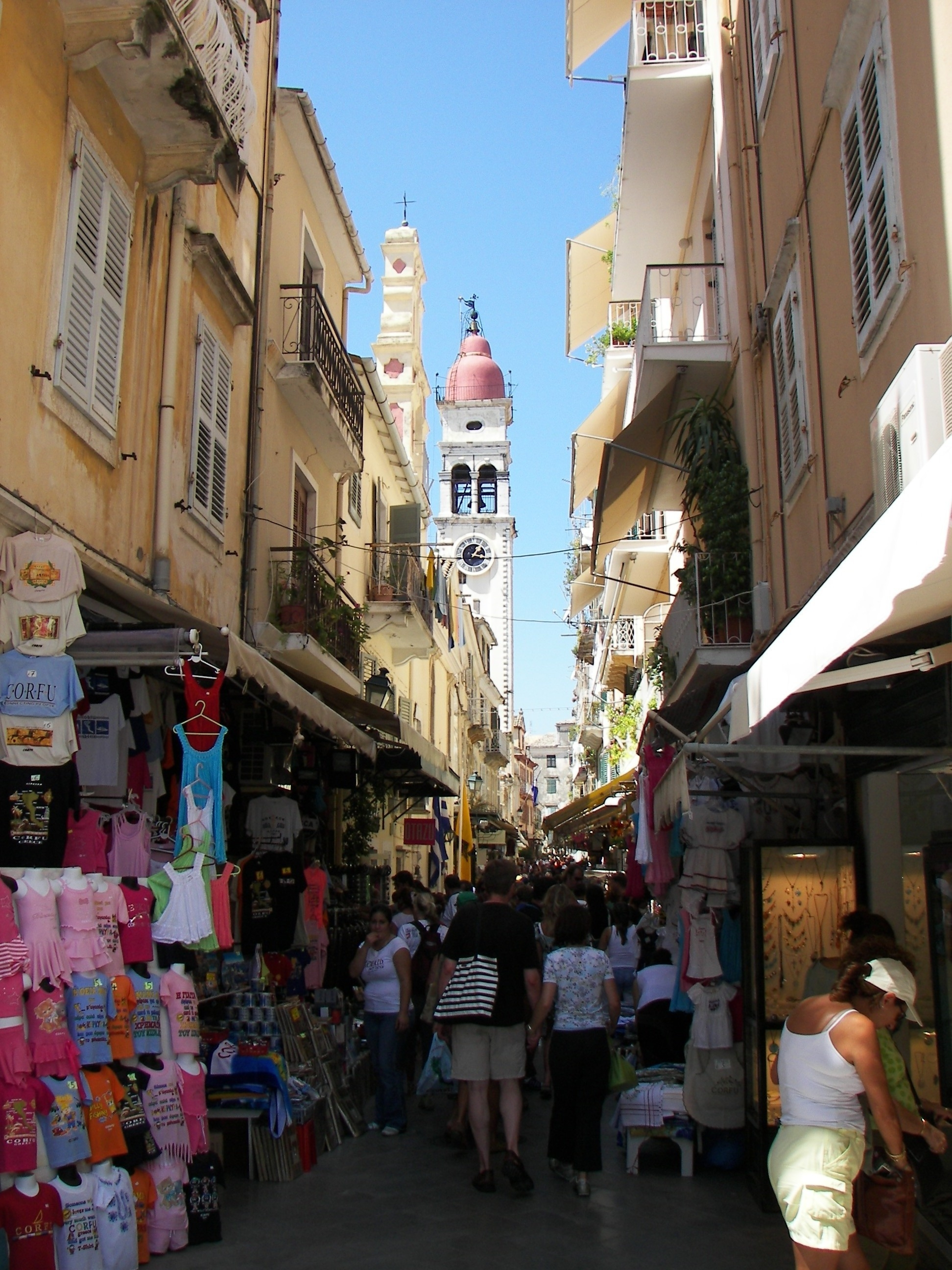
Typical Venetian architecture in the old town of Corfu, Ionian Islands, Greece. The Ionian islands, having been under the dominion of the Republic of Venice for centuries, have been inhabited by the Corfiot Italians.

Corfiot Italians (or "Corfiote Italians") are a population from the Greek island of Corfu (Kerkyra) with ethnic and linguistic ties to the Republic of Venice. The origins of the Corfiot Italian community can be found in the expansion of the Italian States toward the Balkans during and after the Crusades. In the 12th century, the Kingdom of Naples sent some Italian families to Corfu to rule the island. From the Fourth Crusade of 1204 onwards, the Republic of Venice sent many Italian families to Corfu. These families brought the Italian language of the Middle Ages to the island. When Venice ruled Corfu and the Ionian islands, which lasted during the Renaissance and until the late 18th century, most of the Corfiote upper classes spoke Italian (or specifically Venetian in many cases), but the mass of people remained Greek ethnically, linguistically, and religiously before and after the Ottoman sieges of the 16th century. Corfiot Italians were mainly concentrated in the city of Corfu, which was called "Città di Corfu" by the Venetians. More than half of the population of Corfu city in the 18th century spoke the Venetian language. The re-emergence of Greek nationalism, after the Napoleonic era, contributed to the gradual disappearance of the Corfiot Italians. Corfu was ultimately incorporated into the Kingdom of Greece in 1864. The Greek government abolished all Italian schools in the Ionian islands in 1870, and as a consequence, by the 1940s there were only 400 Corfiote Italians left. The architecture of Corfu City still reflects its long Venetian heritage, with its multi-storied buildings, its spacious squares such as the popular "Spianada" and the narrow cobblestone alleys known as "Kantounia".

Napoleon, the most notable Italian French personality

There has always been migration, since ancient times, between what is today Italy and France. Since the 16th century, Florence and its citizens have long enjoyed a very close relationship with France. In 1533, at the age of fourteen, Catherine de' Medici married Henry, the second son of King Francis I and Queen Claude of France. Under the gallicised version of her name, Catherine de Médici, she became Queen consort of France when Henry ascended to the throne in 1547. Later on, after Henry died, she became regent on behalf of her ten-year-old son King Charles IX and was granted sweeping powers. After Charles died in 1574, Catherine played a key role in the reign of her third son, Henry III. Other notable examples of Italians that played a major role in the history of France include Cardinal Mazarin, born in Pescina was a cardinal, diplomat and politician, who served as the chief minister of France from 1642 until his death in 1661. As for the personalities of the modern era, Napoleon Bonaparte, French emperor and general, was ethnically Italian of Corsican origin, whose family was of Genoese and Tuscan ancestry.

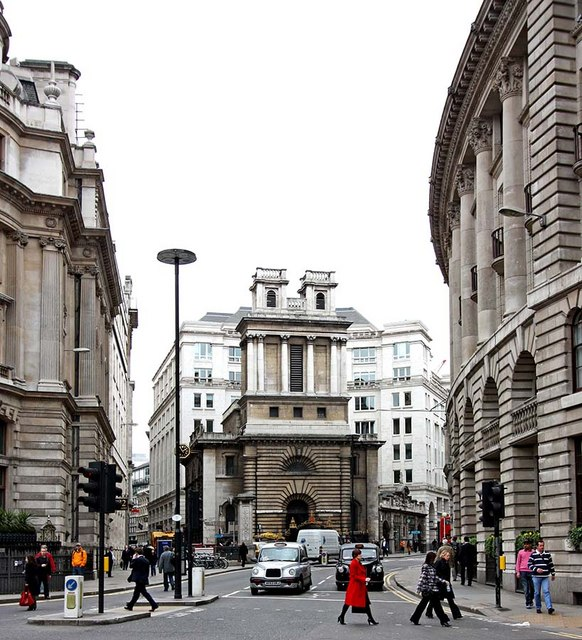
Lombard Street in London took its name from the small but powerful community from northern Italy, living there as bankers and merchants after AD 1000.

After the conquest of Anglo-Saxon England in 1066, the first recorded Italian communities in England began from the merchants and sailors living in Southampton. The famous "Lombard Street" in London took its name from the small but powerful community from northern Italy, living there as bankers and merchants after the year 1000. The rebuilding of Westminster Abbey showed significant Italian artistic influence in the construction of the so-called 'Cosmati' Pavement completed in 1245 and a unique example of the style unknown outside of Italy, the work of highly skilled team of Italian craftsmen led by a Roman named Ordoricus. In 1303, Edward I negotiated an agreement with the Lombard merchant community that secured custom duties and certain rights and privileges. The revenues from the customs duty were handled by the Riccardi, a group of bankers from Lucca in Italy. This was in return for their service as money lenders to the crown, which helped finance the Welsh Wars. When the war with France broke out, the French king confiscated the Riccardi's assets, and the bank went bankrupt. After this, the Frescobaldi of Florence took over the role as money lenders to the English crown.

Large numbers of Italians have resided in Germany since the early Middle Ages, particularly architects, craftsmen and traders. During the late Middle Ages and early modern times many Italians came to Germany for business, and relations between the two countries prospered. The political borders were also somewhat intertwined under the German princes' attempts to extend control over all the Holy Roman Empire, which extended from northern Germany down to Northern Italy. During the Renaissance many Italian bankers, architects and artists moved to Germany and successfully integrated in the German society. The first Italians came to Poland in the Middle Ages, however, substantial migration of Italians to Poland began in the 16th century (see Poland section below).

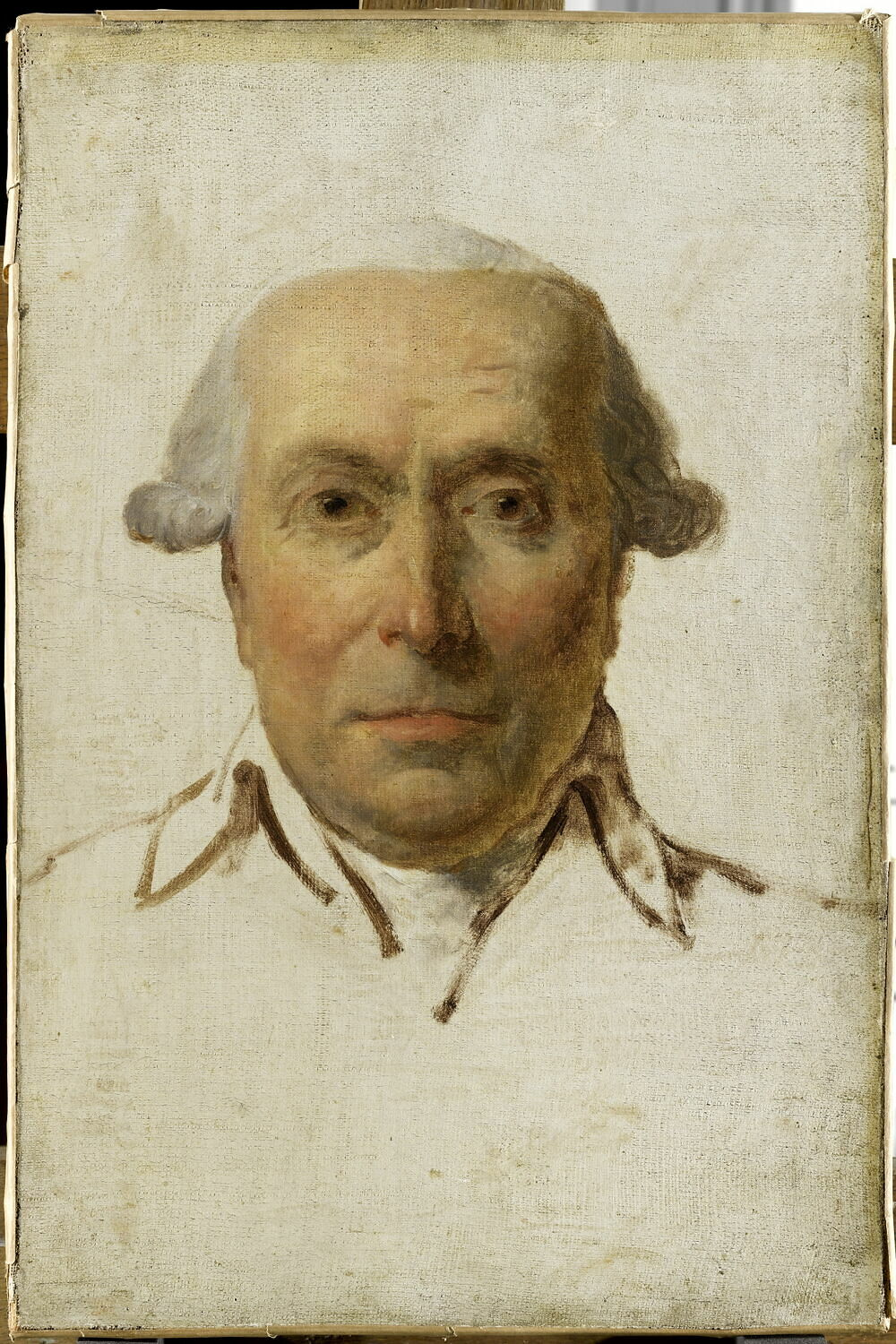
Filippo Mazzei, an Italian physician, philosopher, diplomat, and author, whose phrase "All men are by nature equally free and independent" may have inspired Thomas Jefferson in drafting the Declaration of Independence.

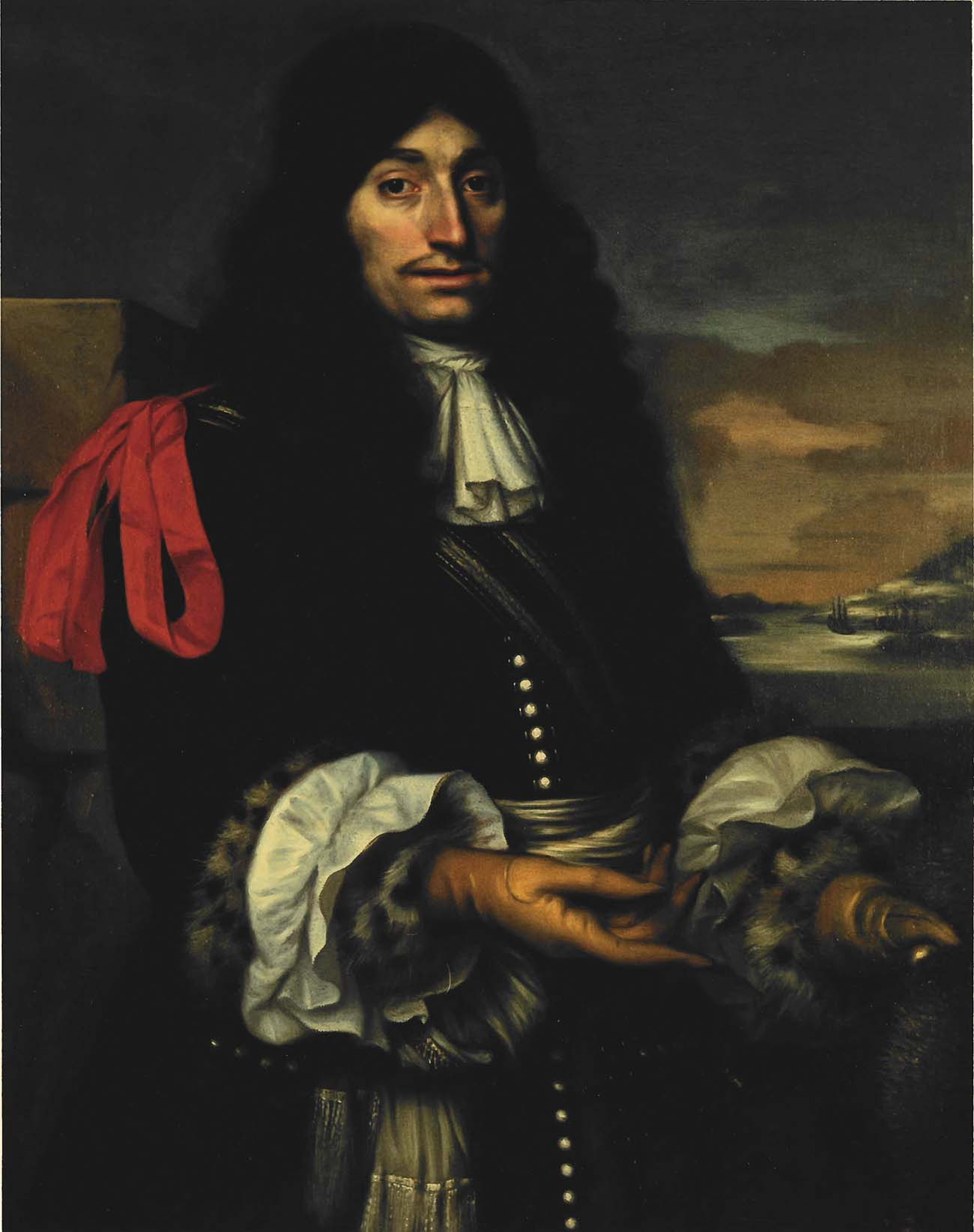
Enrico Tonti, who founded the first European settlement in Illinois in 1679, and in Arkansas in 1683, making him "The Father of Arkansas".

Italians in the United States before 1880 included a number of explorers, starting with Christopher Columbus, and a few small settlements. The first Italian to be registered as residing in the area corresponding to the current U.S. was Pietro Cesare Alberti, commonly regarded as the first Italian American, a Venetian seaman who, in 1635, settled in the Dutch colony of New Amsterdam, what would eventually become New York City. Enrico Tonti, together with the French explorer René-Robert Cavelier, Sieur de La Salle, explored the Great Lakes region. Tonti founded the first European settlement in Illinois in 1679, and in Arkansas in 1683, making him "The Father of Arkansas". With LaSalle, he co-founded New Orleans, and was governor of the Louisiana Territory for the next 20 years. His brother Alfonso Tonti, with French explorer Antoine de la Mothe Cadillac, was the co-founder of Detroit in 1701, and was its acting colonial governor for 12 years. The Taliaferro family (originally Tagliaferro), believed to have roots in Venice, was one of the First Families to settle Virginia.

In 1773–1785, Filippo Mazzei, a physician and close friend and confidant of Thomas Jefferson, published a pamphlet containing the phrase, "All men are by nature equally free and independent. Such equality is necessary in order to create a free government. All men must be equal to each other in natural law". As claimed by John F. Kennedy in A Nation of Immigrants and by Joint Resolution 175 of the 103rd Congress, Mazzei's phrase may have inspired Jefferson in drafting the Declaration of Independence. Italian Americans served in the American Revolutionary War both as soldiers and officers. Francesco Vigo aided the colonial forces of George Rogers Clark by serving as one of the foremost financiers of the Revolution in the frontier Northwest. Later, he was a co-founder of Vincennes University in Indiana.

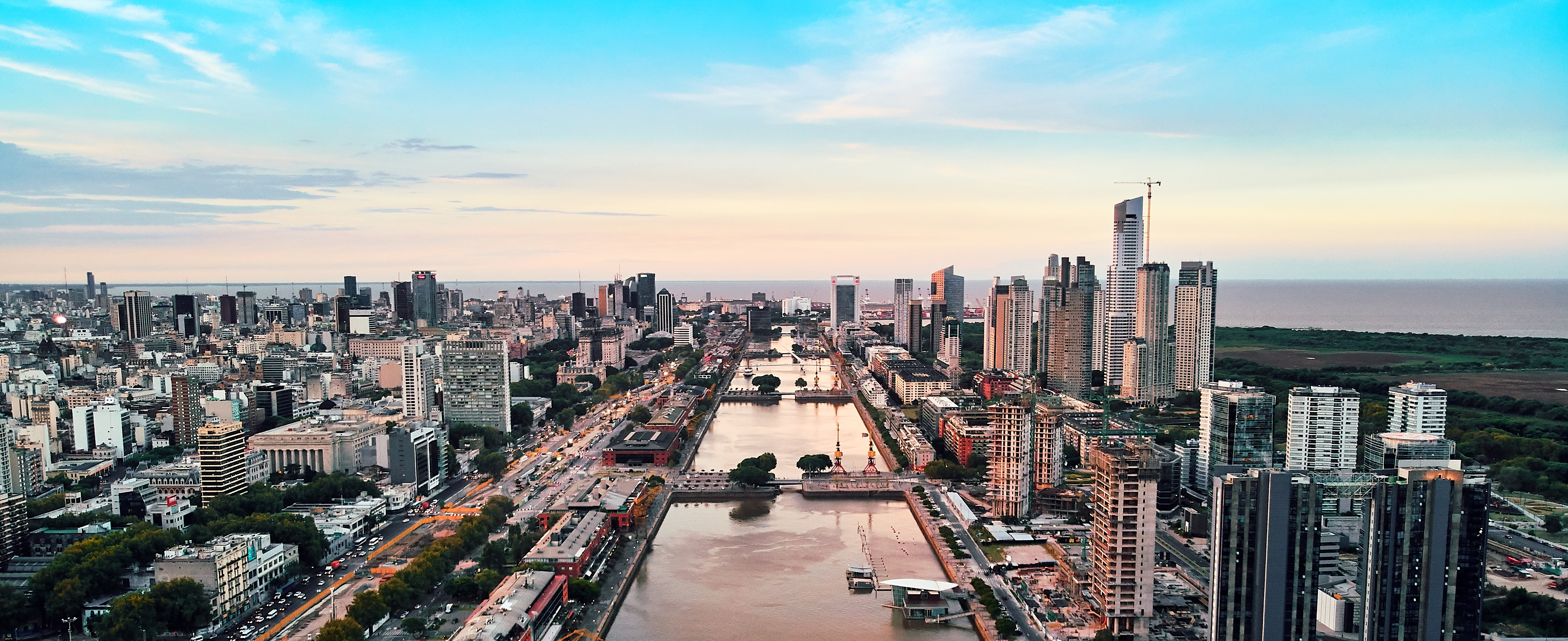
View of Buenos Aires, Argentina. Leonardo Gribeo gave the name to the city

During the Spanish conquest of what would be present-day Argentine territory, an Italian Leonardo Gribeo, from the region of Sardinia, accompanied Pedro de Mendoza to the place where Buenos Aires would be founded. From Cagliari to Spain, to Río de la Plata, then to Buenos Aires, he brought an image of Saint Mary of Good Air, to which the "miracle" of having reached a good place was attributed, giving the founded city its name in Spanish: Buenos Aires (lit. "good airs"). The presence of Italians in the Río de la Plata Basin predates the birth of Argentina. Small groups of Italians began to emigrate to the present-day Argentine territory already in the second half of the 17th century. There were already Italians in Buenos Aires during the May Revolution, which started the Argentine War of Independence. In particular, Manuel Belgrano, Manuel Alberti and Juan José Castelli, all three of Italian descent, were part of the May Revolution and the Primera Junta. The Italian community had already grown to such an extent that in 1836 the Kingdom of Piedmont-Sardinia sent an ambassador, Baron Picolet d'Hermilion.

== History ==
=== From Italian unification to World War I ===
Italian emigration per region from 1876 to 1900 and from 1901 to 1915

The Unification of Italy, with Rome made capital on 3 February 1871, broke down the feudal land system, which had survived in the south since the Middle Ages, especially where land had been the inalienable property of aristocrats, religious bodies or the king. The breakdown of feudalism and the ensuing redistribution of land, however, did not necessarily lead to small farmers in the south winding up with land they could own, work, and profit from. Many remained landless, and plots grew smaller and smaller and so less and less productive, as land was subdivided amongst heirs. The transition was not smooth for the south (the "Mezzogiorno"). The path to unification and modernization created a divide between Northern and Southern Italy called Southern question.

Between 1860 and the start of World War I in 1914, 9 million Italians left permanently of a total of 16 million who emigrated, most travelling to North or South America. The numbers may have even been higher; 14 million from 1876 to 1914, according to another study. Annual emigration averaged almost 220,000 in the period 1876 to 1900, and almost 650,000 from 1901 through 1915. Prior to 1900 the majority of Italian immigrants were from northern and central Italy. Two-thirds of the migrants who left Italy between 1870 and 1914 were men with traditional skills. Peasants were half of all migrants before 1896.

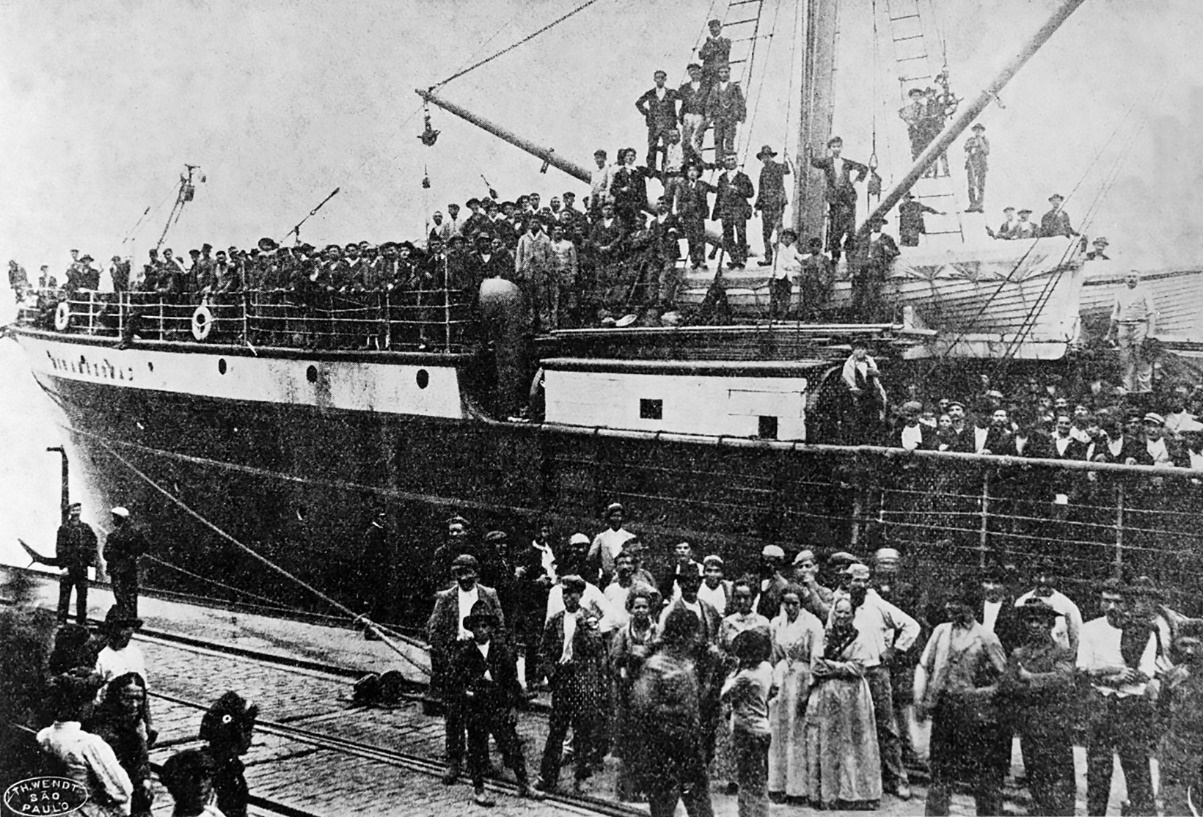
Ship loaded with Italian emigrants arrived in Brazil (1907).

As the number of Italian emigrants abroad increased, so did their remittances, which encouraged further emigration, even in the face of factors that might logically be thought to decrease the need to leave, such as increased wages at home. It has been termed "persistent and path-dependent emigration flow". Friends and relatives who left first sent back money for tickets and helped relatives as they arrived. That tended to support an emigration flow since even improving conditions in the original country took time to trickle down to potential emigrants to convince them not to leave. The emigrant flow was stemmed only by dramatic events, such as the outbreak of World War I, which greatly disrupted the flow of people trying to leave Europe, and the restrictions on immigration that were put in place by receiving countries. Examples of such restrictions in the United States were the Emergency Quota Act of 1921 and the Immigration Act of 1924. Restrictive legislation to limit emigration from Italy was introduced by the fascist government of the 1920s and 1930s.

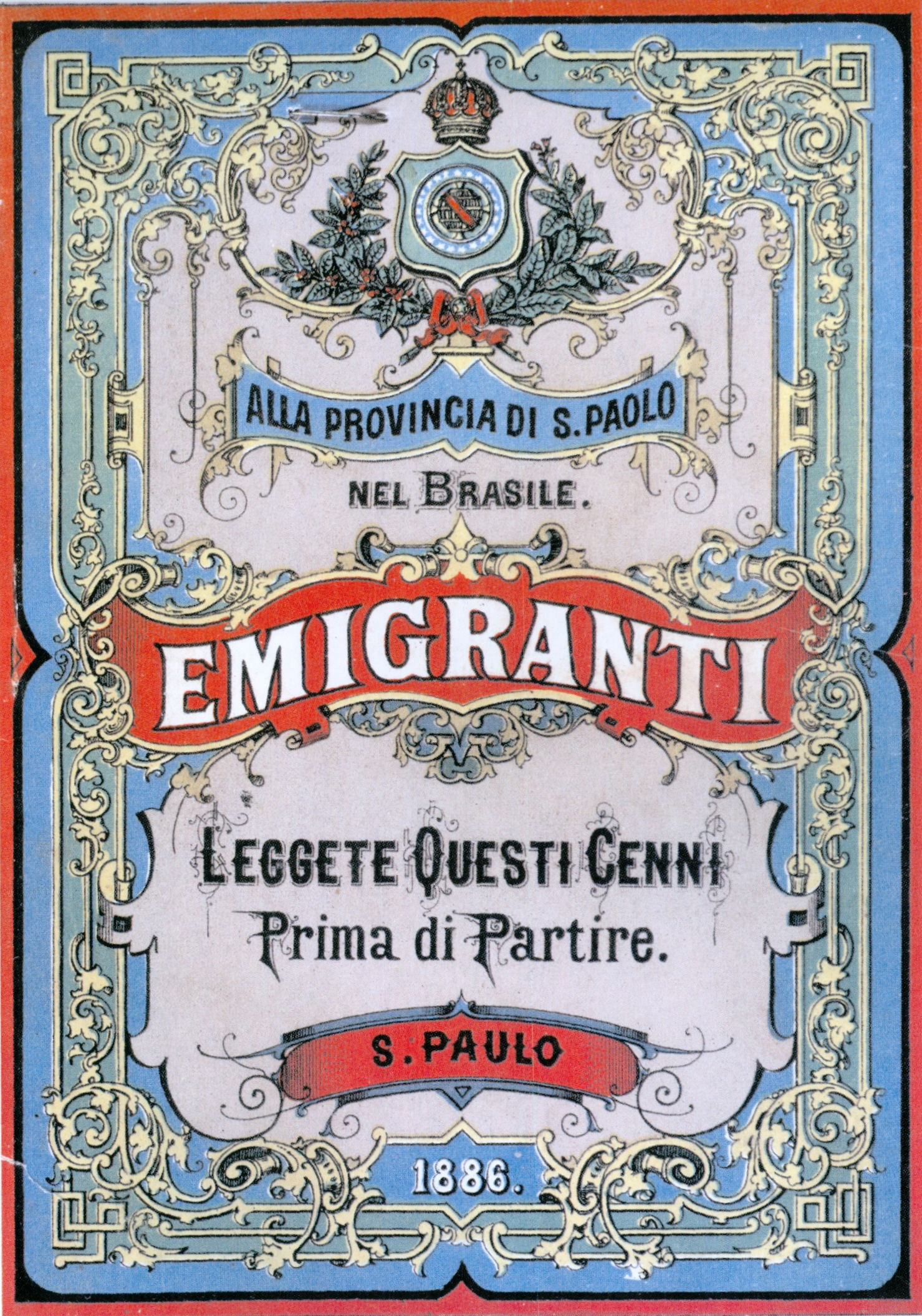
Poster created in 1886 by the Brazilian state of São Paulo, intended for potential Italian emigrants to Brazil

The Italian diaspora did not affect all regions of the nation equally. In the second phase of emigration (1900 to World War I), slightly less than half of emigrants were from the south and most of them were from rural areas, as they were driven off the land by inefficient land management, lawlessness and sickness (pellagra and cholera). Robert Foerster, in Italian Emigration of our Times (1919) says, "[Emigration has been]… well nigh expulsion; it has been exodus, in the sense of depopulation; it has been characteristically permanent". The very large number of emigrants from Friuli-Venezia Giulia, a region with a population of only 509,000 in 1870 until 1914 is due to the fact that many of those counted among the 1.407 million emigrants actually lived in the Austrian Littoral which had a larger polyglot population of Croats, Friulians, Italians and Slovenes than in the Italian Friuli.

Mezzadria, a form of sharefarming where tenant families obtained a plot to work on from an owner and kept a reasonable share of the profits, was more prevalent in central Italy, and is one of the reasons that there was less emigration from that part of Italy. The south lacked entrepreneurs, and absentee landlords were common. Although owning land was the basic yardstick of wealth, farming there was socially despised. People invested not in agricultural equipment, but in such things as low-risk state bonds.

The rule that emigration from cities was negligible has an important exception, in Naples. The city went from being the capital of its own kingdom in 1860 to being just another large city in Italy. The loss of bureaucratical jobs and the subsequently declining financial situation led to high unemployment in the area. In the early-1880s, epidemics of cholera also struck the city, causing many people to leave. The epidemics were the driving force behind the decision to rebuild entire sections of the city, an undertaking known as the "risanamento" (literally "making healthy again"), a pursuit that lasted until the start of World War I.

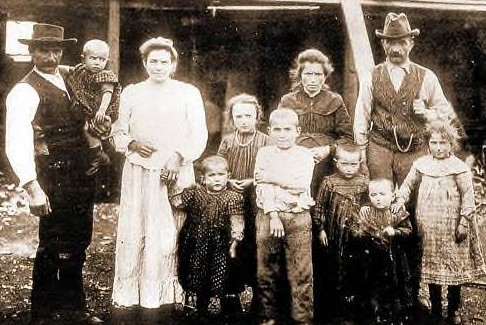
Modenese emigrants to Capitan Pastene (Chile) in 1910: the Castagnoli family

During the first few years before the unification of Italy, emigration was not particularly controlled by the state. Emigrants were often in the hands of emigration agents whose job was to make money for themselves by moving emigrants. Such labor agents and recruiters were called padroni, translating to patron or boss. Abuses led to the first migration law in Italy, passed in 1888, to bring the many emigration agencies under state control. On 31 January 1901, the Commissariat of Emigration was created, granting licenses to carriers, enforcing fixed ticket costs, keeping order at ports of embarkation, providing health inspection for those leaving, setting up hostels and care facilities and arranging agreements with receiving countries to help care for those arriving. The Commissariat tried to take care of emigrants before they left and after they arrived, such as dealing with the American laws that discriminated against alien workers (like the Alien Contract Labor Law) and even suspending, for some time, emigration to Brazil, where many migrants had wound up as quasi-slaves on large coffee plantations. The Commissariat also helped to set up remittances sent by emigrants from the United States back to their homeland, which turned into a constant flow of money amounting, by some accounts, to about 5% of the Italian GNP. In 1903, the Commissariat also set the available ports of embarkation as Palermo, Naples and Genoa, excluding the port of Venice, which had previously also been used.

=== Interwar period ===
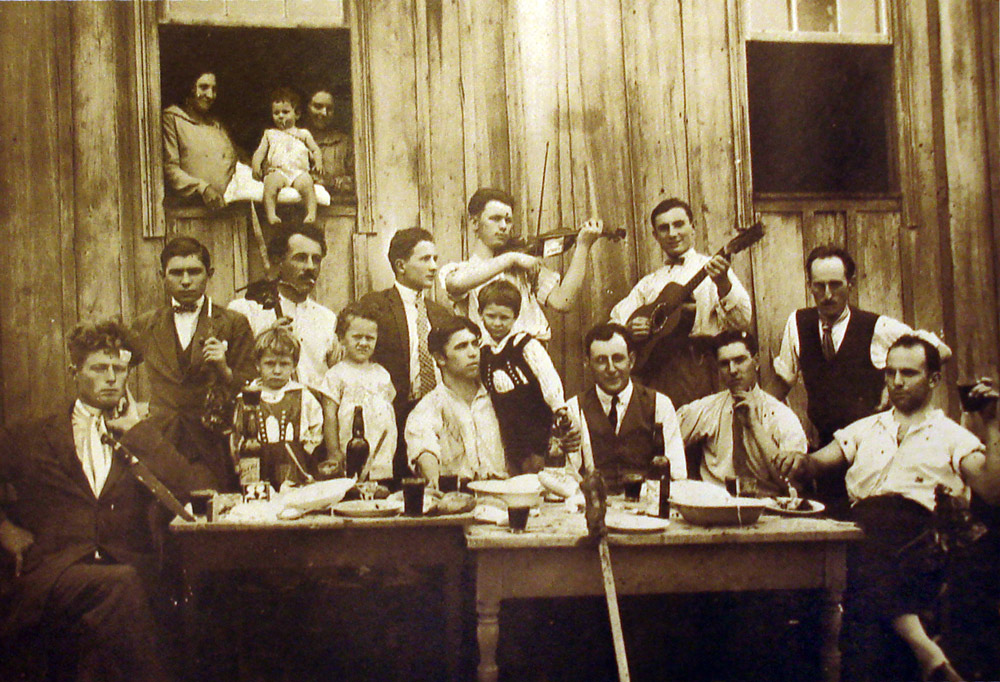
The Benvenuti family, who immigrated to Caxias do Sul, a municipality of Brazil founded by Italian emigrants from Veneto, in a photo of 1928

Although the physical perils involved with transatlantic ship traffic during World War I disrupted emigration from all parts of Europe, including Italy, the condition of various national economies in the immediate post-war period was so bad that immigration picked up almost immediately. Foreign newspapers ran scare stories similar to those published 40 years earlier (when, for example, on 18 December 1880, The New York Times ran an editorial, "Undesirable Emigrants", full of typical invective of the day against the "promiscuous immigration… [of]…the filthy, wretched, lazy, criminal dregs of the meanest sections of Italy"). An article written during the interwar period on 17 April 1921, in the same newspaper, used the headlines "Italians Coming in Great Numbers" and "Number of Immigrants Will Be Limited Only By Capacity of Liners" (there was now a limited number of ships available because of recent wartime losses) and that potential immigrants were thronging the quays in the cities of Genoa. This article continues: ... the foreigner who walks through a city like Naples can easily realize the problem the government is dealing with: "the back streets are literally teeming with children running around the streets and on the dirty and happy sidewalks. ... The suburbs of Naples ... teem with children who, in number, can only be compared to those found in Delhi, Agra and other cities of the East Indies ...".

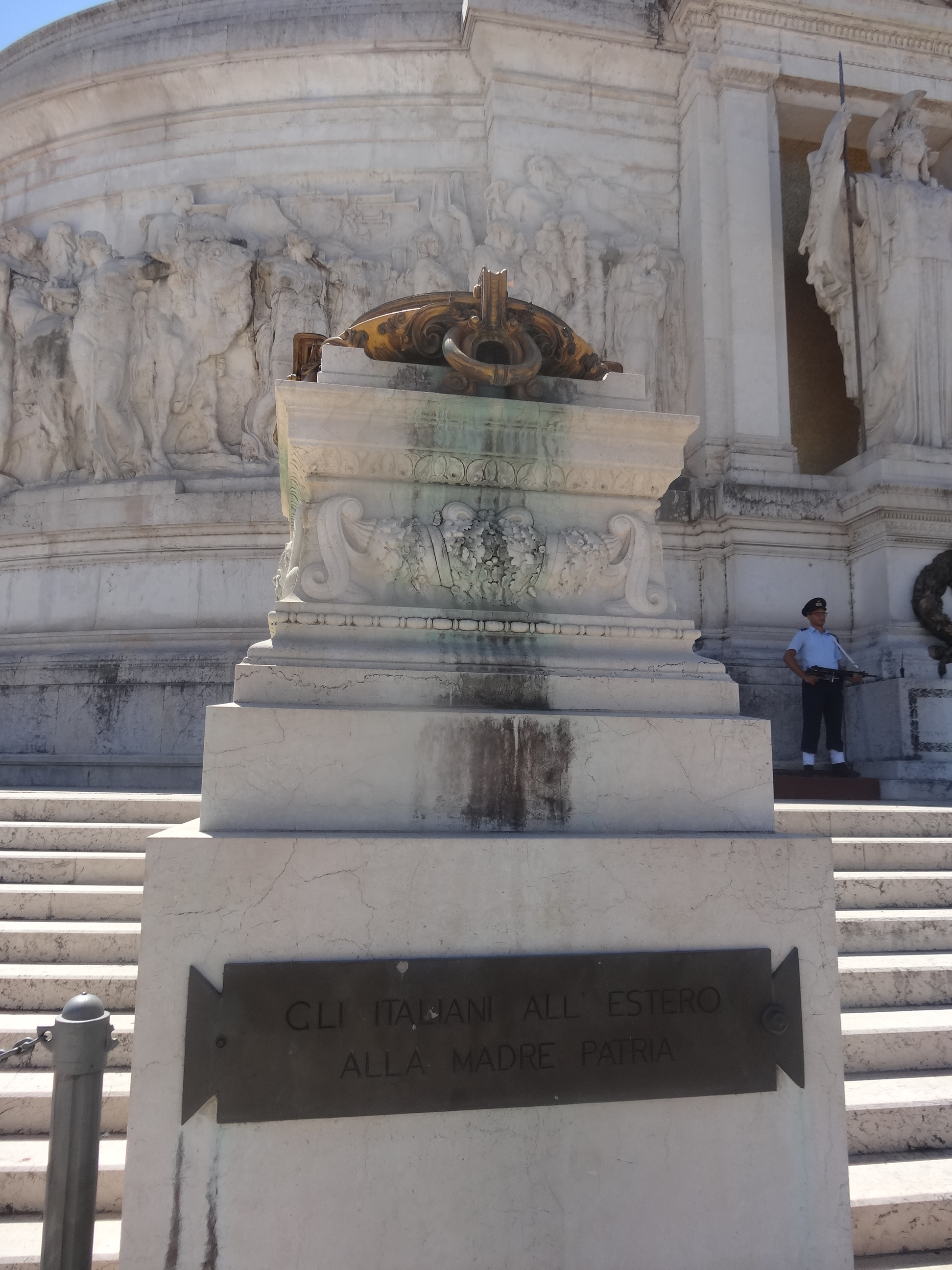
One of the two braziers that burn perpetually on the sides of the tomb of the Italian Unknown Soldier at Altare della Patria in Rome. At their base there is a plaque bearing the inscription Gli italiani all'estero alla Madre Patria ("Italians abroad to the Motherland").

The extreme economic difficulties of post-war Italy and the severe internal tensions within the country, which led to the rise of fascism, led 614,000 immigrants away in 1920, half of them going to the United States. When the fascists came to power in 1922, there was a gradual slowdown in the flow of emigrants from Italy. However, during the first five years of fascist rule, 1,500,000 people left Italy. By then, the nature of the emigrants had changed; there was, for example, a marked increase in the rise of relatives outside the working age moving to be with their families, who had already left Italy.

The bond of the emigrants with their mother country continued to be very strong even after their departure. Many Italian emigrants made donations to the construction of the Altare della Patria (1885–1935), a part of the monument dedicated to King Victor Emmanuel II of Italy, and in memory of that, the inscription of the plaque on the two burning braziers perpetually at the Altare della Patria next to the tomb of the Italian Unknown Soldier, reads "Gli italiani all'estero alla Madre Patria" ("Italians abroad to the Motherland"). The allegorical meaning of the flames that burn perpetually is linked to their symbolism, which is centuries old, since it has its origins in classical antiquity, especially in the cult of the dead. A fire that burns eternally symbolizes that the memory, in this case of the sacrifice of the Unknown Soldier and the bond of the country of origin, is perpetually alive in Italians, even in those who are far from their country, and will never fade.

=== After World War II ===
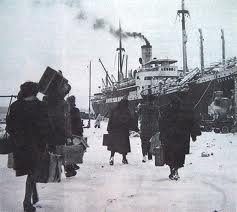
Istrian Italians leave Pola in 1947 during the Istrian-Dalmatian exodus.

John Gunther in 1949 attributed postwar Italy's poverty to the country only being able to support 32 million of its 45 million people, with 400,000 babies born each year. Prime Minister Alcide De Gasperi joked to him that he would gladly give up all Marshall Plan aid if he could annually export 400,000 Italians.

Following the defeat of Italy in World War II and the Paris Treaties of 1947, Istria, Kvarner and most of Julian March, with the cities of Pola, Fiume and Zara, passed from Italy to Yugoslavia, causing the Istrian-Dalmatian exodus, which led to the emigration of between 230,000 and 350,000 of local ethnic Italians (Istrian Italians and Dalmatian Italians), towards Italy, and in smaller numbers, towards the Americas, Australia and South Africa.

The Italian emigration of the second half of the 20th century, on the other hand, was mostly to European nations experiencing economic growth. From the 1940s onwards, Italian emigration flow headed mainly to Switzerland and Belgium, while from the following decade, France and Germany were added among the top destinations. These countries were considered by many, at the time of departure, as a temporary destination—often only for a few months—in which to work and earn money in order to build a better future in Italy. This phenomenon took place the most in the 1970s, a period that was marked by the return to their homeland of many Italian emigrants.

The Italian state signed an emigration pact with Germany in 1955 which guaranteed mutual commitment in the matter of migratory movements and which led almost three million Italians to cross the border in search of work. As of 2017, there are approximately 700,000 Italians in Germany, while in Switzerland this number reaches approximately 500,000. They are mainly of Sicilian, Calabrian, Abruzzese and Apulian origin, but also Venetian and Emilian, many of whom have dual citizenship and therefore the ability to vote in both countries. In Belgium and Switzerland, the Italian communities remain the most numerous foreign representations, and although many return to Italy after retirement, often the children and grandchildren remain in the countries of birth, where they have now taken root.

An important phenomenon of aggregation that is found in Europe, as well as in other countries and continents that have been the destination of migratory flows of Italians, is that of emigration associations. The Ministry of Foreign Affairs estimates that over 10,000 associations set up by Italian emigrants over the course of over a century are present abroad. Benefit, cultural, assistance and service associations that have constituted a fundamental point of reference for emigrants. The major associative networks of various ideal inspirations are now gathered in the National Council of Emigration. One of the largest associative networks in the world, together with those of the Catholic world, is that of the Italian Federation of migrant workers and families.

=== "New emigration" of the 21st century ===
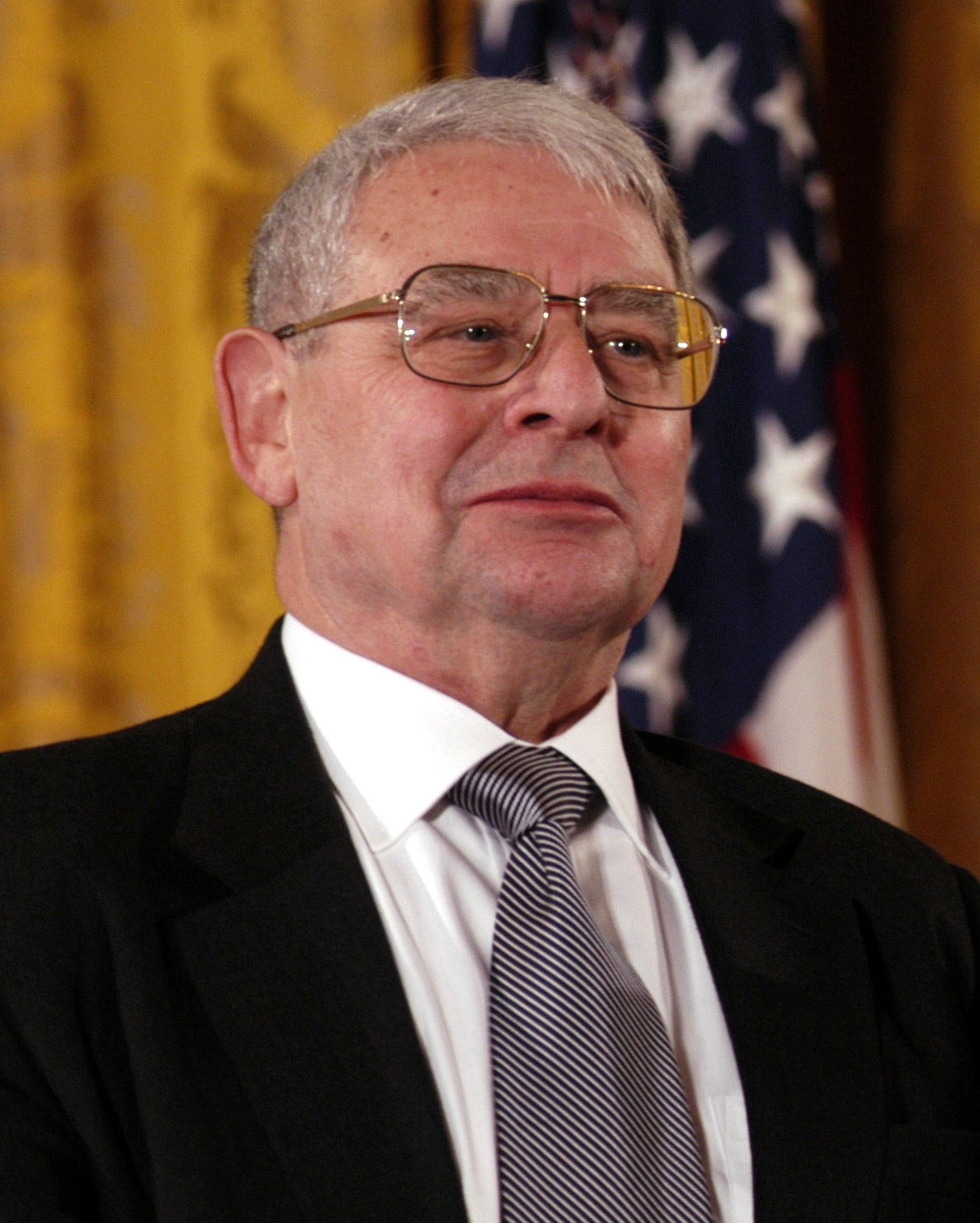
Riccardo Giacconi, Italian naturalized American physicist, winner of the Nobel Prize in Physics in 2002

Between the end of the 20th century and the beginning of the next, the flow of Italian emigrants around the world greatly attenuated. Nevertheless, migration from certain regions never stopped, such as in Sicily. However, following the effects of the Great Recession, a continuous flow of expatriates has spread since the end of the 2010s. Although numerically lower than the previous two, this period mainly affects young people who are often graduates, so much so that is defined as a "brain drain".

In particular, this flow is mainly directed towards Germany, where over 35,000 Italians arrived in 2012 alone, but also towards other countries such as the United Kingdom, France, Switzerland, Canada, Australia, the United States and the South American countries. This is an annual flow which, according to the 2012 data from the registry office of Italians residing abroad (AIRE), is around 78,000 people with an increase of about 20,000 compared to 2011, even if it is estimated that the actual number of people who have emigrated is considerably higher (between two and three times), as many compatriots cancel their residence in Italy with much delay compared to their actual departure.

The phenomenon of the so-called "new emigration" caused by the serious economic crisis also affects all of southern Europe such as countries like Spain, Portugal and Greece (as well as Ireland and France) which record similar, if not greater, emigration trends. It is widely believed that the places where there are no structural changes in economic and social policies are those most subject to the increase in this emigration flow. Regarding Italy, it is also significant that these flows no longer concern only the regions of southern Italy, but also those of the north, such as Lombardy and Emilia-Romagna.

According to the available statistics, the community of Italian citizens residing abroad amounts to 4,600,000 people (2015 data). It is therefore greatly reduced, from a percentage point of view, from 9,200,000 in the early 1920s (when it was about one fifth of the entire Italian population).

The "Report of Italians in the World 2011" produced by the Migrantes Foundation, which is part of the CEI, specified that:

Italians residing abroad as of 31 December 2010 were 4,115,235 (47.8% are women). The Italian emigrant community continues to increase both for new departures, and for internal growth (enlargement of families or people who acquire citizenship by descent). Italian emigration is concentrated mainly between Europe (55.8%) and America (38.8%). Followed by Oceania (3.2%), Africa (1.3%) and Asia with 0.8%. The country with the most Italians is Argentina (648,333), followed by Germany (631,243), then Switzerland (520,713). Furthermore, 54.8% of Italian emigrants are of southern origin (over 1,400,000 from the South and almost 800,000 from the Islands); 30.1% comes from the northern regions (almost 600,000 from the Northeast and 580,000 from the Northwest); finally, 15% (588,717) comes from the central regions. Central-southern emigrants are the overwhelming majority in Europe (62.1%) and Oceania (65%). In Asia and Africa, however, half of the Italians come from the North. The region with the most emigrants is Sicily (646,993), followed by Campania (411,512), Lazio (346,067), Calabria (343,010), Apulia (309,964) and Lombardy (291,476). The province with the most emigrants is Rome (263,210), followed by Agrigento (138,517), Cosenza (138,152), Salerno (108,588) and Naples (104,495).

— CEI report on "new emigration"

In 2008, about 60,000 Italians changed citizenship; they mostly come from Northern Italy (74%) and have preferred Germany as their adopted country (12% of the total emigrants). The number of Italian citizens residing abroad according to those registered in the AIRE registry:

Italian citizens residing abroad

Year	Pop.	±%
2000	2,352,965	—
2001	2,536,643	+7.8%
2002	2,751,593	+8.5%
2003	3,045,064	+10.7%
2004	3,316,635	+8.9%
2005	3,520,809	+6.2%

Year	Pop.	±%
2006	3,547,808	+0.8%
2007	3,649,377	+2.9%
2008	3,853,614	+5.6%
2009	3,995,732	+3.7%
2010	4,115,235	+3.0%
2011	4,208,877	+2.3%

Year	Pop.	±%
2012	4,341,156	+3.1%
2014	4,521,000	+4.1%
2016	4,973,940	+10.0%
2018	5,134,000	+3.2%
2020	5,652,080	+10.1%
2022	5,806,068	+2.7%

Source: Statistiche relative all'elenco aggiornato dei cittadini italiani residenti all'estero (AIRE)

Most of italians registered at AIRE are born abroad (70% circa). They are descendents of italian emigrants who conserved the citizenship of their parents thanks to easy italian legislation. Many south americans acquired italian citizenship through ius sanguinis.

== By continent ==
=== Africa ===
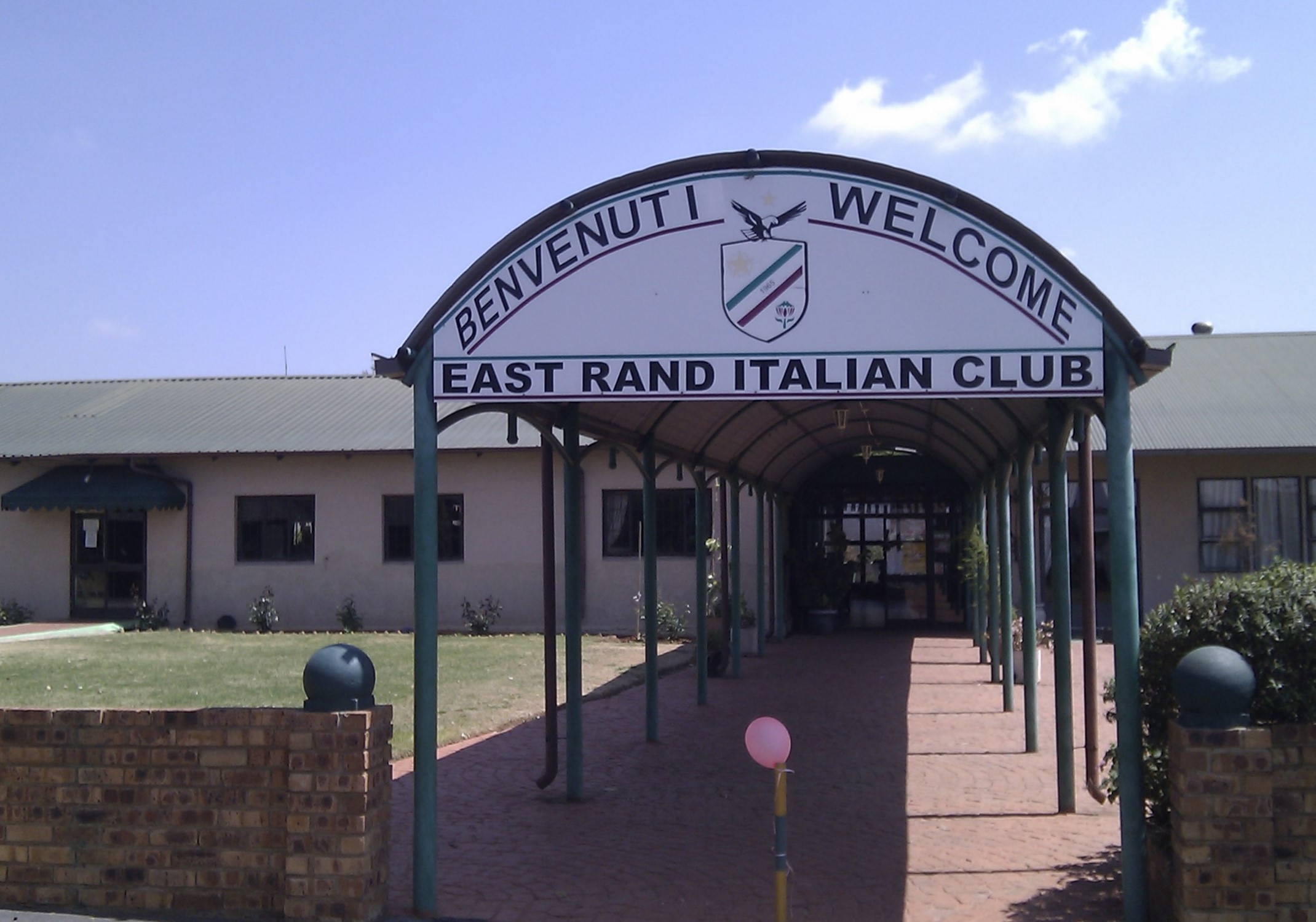
Italian Club in Boksburg, in South Africa

Although Italians did not emigrate to South Africa in large numbers, those who arrived there have nevertheless made an impact on the country. Before World War II, relatively few Italian immigrants arrived, though there were some prominent exceptions such as the Cape's first Prime Minister John Molteno. South African Italians made big headlines during World War II, when Italians were captured in Italian East Africa, they needed to be sent to a safe stronghold to be detained as prisoners of war (POWs). South Africa was the perfect destination, and the first POWs arrived in Durban, in 1941. In the early 1970s, there were over 40,000 Italians in South Africa, scattered throughout the provinces but concentrated in the main cities. Some of these Italians had taken refuge in South Africa, escaping the decolonization of Rhodesia and other African states. In the 1990s, a period of crisis began for Italian South Africans and many returned to Europe; however, the majority successfully integrated into the multiracial society of contemporary South Africa. The Italian community consists of over 77,400 people (0.1–2% of South Africa's population), half of whom have Italian citizenship. Those of Venetian origin number about 5,000, mainly residing in Johannesburg, while the most numerous Italian regional communities are the southern ones. The official Italian registry records 28,059 Italians residing in South Africa in 2007, excluding South Africans with dual citizenship.

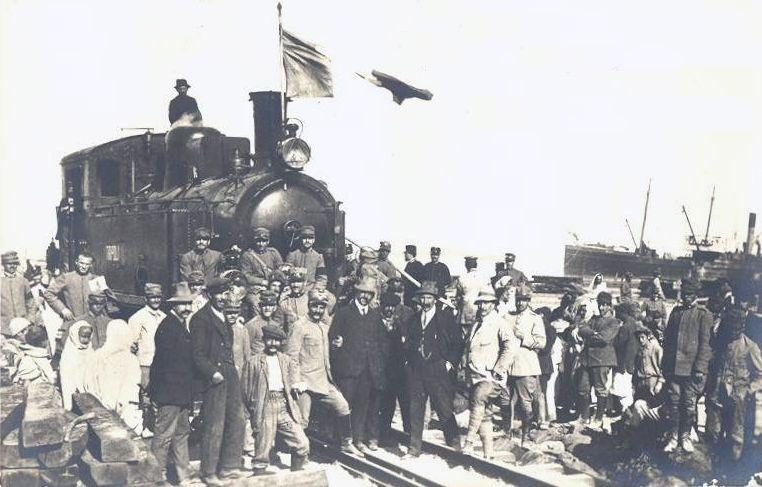
Arrival of the first Italian locomotive in Tripoli, Italian Tripolitania, in 1912

Very numerous was the presence of Italian emigrants in African territories that were Italian colonies, namely in Eritrea, Ethiopia, Libya and Somalia.

In 1911, the Kingdom of Italy waged war on the Ottoman Empire and captured Libya as a colony. Italians settlers were encouraged to come to Libya and did so from 1911 until the outbreak of World War II. In less than thirty years (1911–1940), the Italians in Libya built a significant amount of public works (roads, railways, buildings, ports, etc.) and the Libyan economy flourished. They even created the Tripoli Grand Prix, an international motor racing event first held in 1925 on a racing circuit outside Tripoli (it lasted until 1940). Italian farmers cultivated lands that had returned to native desert for many centuries, and improved Italian Libya's agriculture to international standards (even with the creation of new farm villages). Libya had some 150,000 Italians settlers when Italy entered World War II in 1940, constituting about 18% of the total population in Italian Libya. The Italians in Libya resided (and many still do) in most major cities like Tripoli (37% of the city was Italian), Benghazi (31%), and Hun (3%). Their numbers decreased after 1946. France and the UK took over the spoils of war that included Italian discovery and technical expertise in the extraction and production of crude oil, superhighways, irrigation, electricity. Most of Libya's Italian residents were expelled from the country in 1970, a year after Muammar Gaddafi seized power in a coup d'état on 7 October 1970, but a few hundred Italian settlers returned to Libya in the 2000s (decade).

Year	Italians	Percentage	Total Libya	Source for data on population
1936	112,600	13.26%	848,600	Enciclopedia Geografica Mondiale K-Z, De Agostini, 1996
1939	108,419	12.37%	876,563	Guida Breve d'Italia Vol.III, C.T.I., 1939 (Censimento Ufficiale)
1962	35,000	2.1%	1,681,739	Enciclopedia Motta, Vol.VIII, Motta Editore, 1969
1982	1,500	0.05%	2,856,000	Atlante Geografico Universale, Fabbri Editori, 1988
2004	22,530	0.4%	5,631,585	L'Aménagement Linguistique dans le Monde

Somalia had some 50,000 Italian Somali settlers during World War II, constituting about 5% of the total population in Italian Somaliland. The Italians resided in most major cities in the central and southern parts of the territory, with around 10,000 living in the capital Mogadishu. Other major areas of settlement included Jowhar, which was founded by the Italian prince Luigi Amedeo, Duke of the Abruzzi. Italian used to be a major language, but its influence significantly diminished following independence. It is now most frequently heard among older generations.

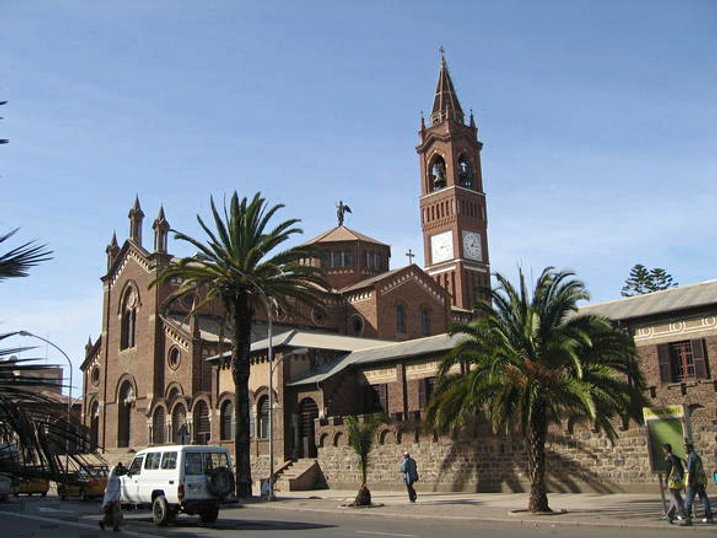
Church of Our Lady of the Rosary in Asmara, built by Italian Eritreans in 1923

Former Italian communities also once thrived in the Horn of Africa, with about 50,000 Italian settlers living in Eritrea in 1935. The Italian Eritrean population grew from 4,000 during World War I, to nearly 100,000 at the beginning of World War II. Their ancestry dates back from the beginning of the Italian colonization of Eritrea at the end of the 19th century, but only during 1930s they settled in large numbers. In the 1939 census of Eritrea there were more than 76,000 Eritrean Italians, most of them living in Asmara (53,000 out of the city's total of 93,000). Many Italian settlers got out of their colony after its conquest by the Allies in November 1941 and they were reduced to only 38,000 by 1946. This also includes a population of mixed Italian and Eritrean descent; most Italian Eritreans still living in Eritrea are from this mixed group. Although many of the remaining Italians stayed during the decolonization process after World War II and are actually assimilated to the Eritrean society, a few are stateless today, as none of them were given citizenship unless through marriage or, more rarely, by having it conferred upon them by the State.

Palace of the Italian Governorate in Ethiopia, 1939

Italians of Ethiopia are immigrants who moved from Italy to Ethiopia starting in the 19th century, as well as their descendants. Most of the Italians moved to Ethiopia after the Italian conquest of Abyssinia in 1936. Italian Ethiopia was made of Harrar, Galla-Sidamo, Amhara and Scioa Governorates in summer 1936 and became a part of the Italian colony Italian East Africa, with capital Addis Abeba and with Victor Emmanuel III proclaiming himself Emperor of Ethiopia. During the Italian occupation of Ethiopia, roughly 300,000 Italians settled in the Italian East Africa (1936–1941). Over 49,000 lived in Asmara in 1939 (around 10% of the city's population), and over 38,000 resided in Addis Abeba. After independence, some Italians remained for decades after receiving full pardon by Emperor Selassie, but eventually nearly 22,000 Italo-Ethiopians left the country due to the Ethiopian Civil War in 1974. 80 original Italian colonists remain alive in 2007, and nearly 2000 mixed descendants of Italians and Ethiopians. In the 2000s, some Italian companies returned to operate in Ethiopia, and a large number of Italian technicians and managers arrived with their families, residing mainly in the metropolitan area of the capital.

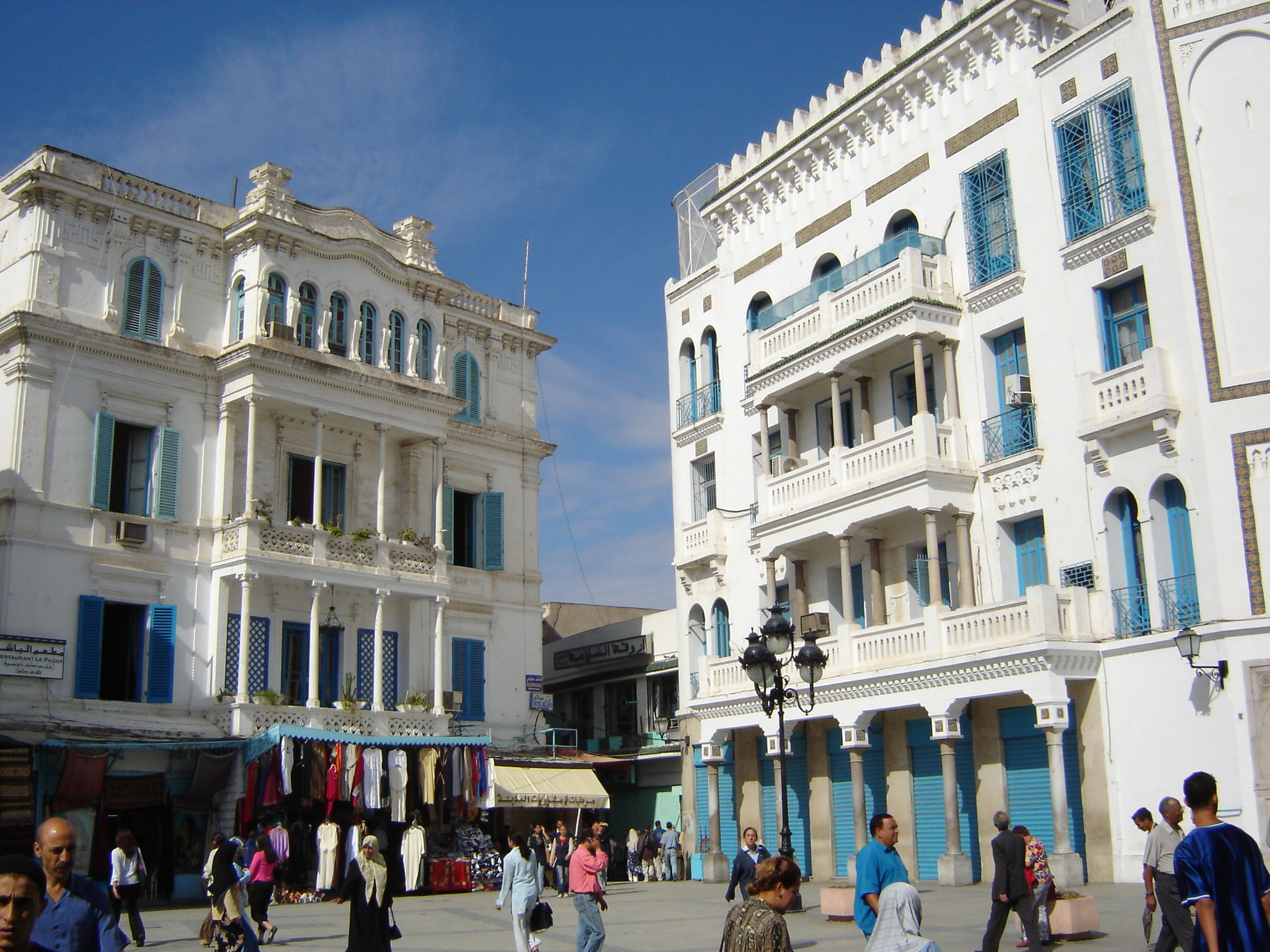
Buildings showing influence of the Italian "Liberty" architecture in Tunis

Conspicuous was the presence of Italian emigrants even in territories that have never been Italian colonies, such as Egypt, Tunisia, Morocco, Zimbabwe and Algeria.

The first Italians in Tunisia at the beginning of the 19th century were mainly traders and professionals in search of new opportunities, coming from Liguria and the other regions of northern Italy. At the end of the 19th century, Tunisia received the immigration of tens of thousands of Italians, mainly from Sicily and also Sardinia. As a consequence, in the first years of the 20th century there were more than 100,000 Italian residents in Tunisia. In 1926, there were 100,000 Italians in Tunisia, compared to 70,000 Frenchmen (unusual since Tunisia was a French protectorate). In the 1946 census, the Italians in Tunisia were 84,935, but in 1959 (3 years after many Italian settlers left to Italy or France after independence from France) there were only 51,702, and in 1969 there were less than 10,000. As of 2005, there are only 900, mainly concentrated in the metropolitan area of Tunis. Another 2,000 Italians, according to the Italian Embassy in Tunis, are "temporary" residents, working as professionals and technicians for Italian companies in different areas of Tunisia.

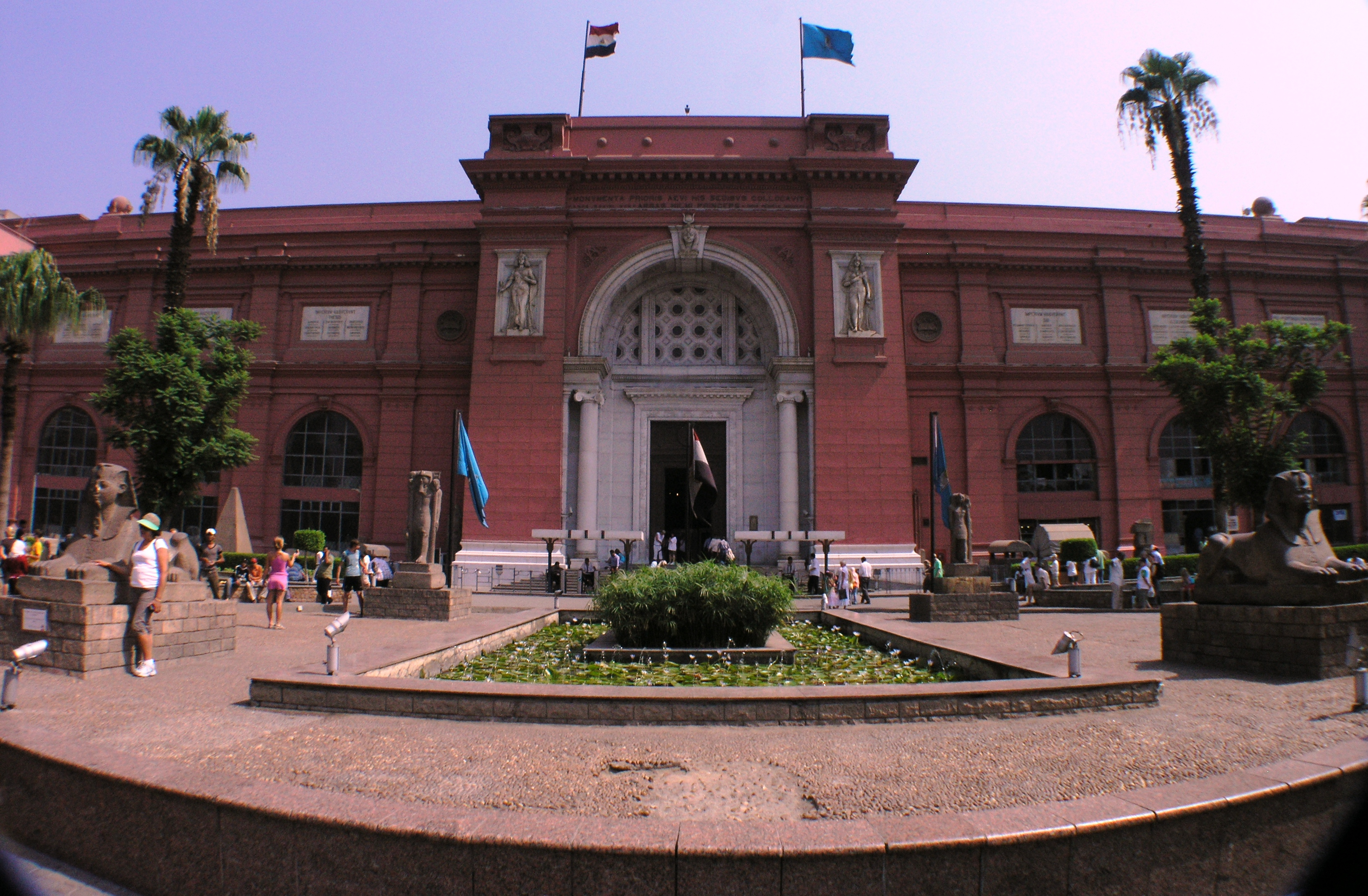
The Egyptian Museum of Cairo (the most important museum of ancient Egypt in the world) was built between 1897 and 1902 by the Garozzo-Zaffarani, an Italian construction company.

During the Middle Ages Italian communities from the "Maritime Republics" of Italy (mainly Pisa, Genoa and Amalfi) were present in Egypt as merchants. Since the Renaissance the Republic of Venice has always been present in the history and commerce of Egypt: there was even a Venetian Quarter in Cairo. From the time of Napoleon I, Italian Egyptians started to grow in a huge way: the size of the community had reached around 55,000 just before World War II, forming the second largest immigrant community in Egypt. After World War II, like many other foreign communities in Egypt, migration back to Italy and the West reduced the size of the community greatly due to wartime internment and the rise of Nasserist nationalism against Westerners. After the war many members of the Italian community related to the defeated Italian expansion in Egypt were forced to move away, starting a process of reduction and disappearance of the Italian Egyptians. After 1952 the Italian Egyptians were reduced – from the nearly 60,000 of 1940 – to just a few thousands. Most Italian Egyptians returned to Italy during the 1950s and 1960s, although a few Italians continue to live in Alexandria and Cairo. Officially the Italians in Egypt at the end of 2007 were 3,374 (1,980 families).

The oldest area of Italian settlement in Zimbabwe was established as Sinoia - today's Chinhoyi - in 1906, as a group settlement scheme by a wealthy Italian lieutenant, Margherito Guidotti, who encouraged several Italian families to settle in the area. The name Sinoria derives from Tjinoyi, a Lozwi/Rozwi Chief who is believed to have been a son of Lukuluba who was the third son of Emperor Netjasike. The Kalanga (Lozwi/Rozwi name) was changed to Sinoia by the white settlers and later Chinhoyi by the Zezuru. Along with other Zimbabweans, a disproportionate number of people of Italian descent now reside abroad, many of whom hold dual Italian or British citizenship. Regardless of the country's economic challenges, there is still a sizable Italian population in Zimbabwe. Though never comprising more than a fraction of the white Zimbabwean population, Italo-Zimbabweans are well represented in the hospitality, real estate, tourism and food and beverage industries. The majority live in Harare, with over 9,000 in 2012, (less than one percent of the city's population), while over 30,000 live abroad mostly in the UK, South Africa, Canada, Italy and Australia.

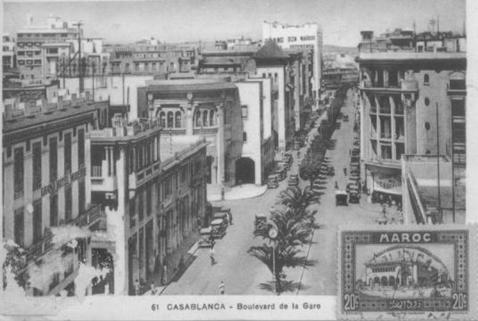
Italian Moroccans were concentrated in the "Maarif" district (also called "Little Italy"), near the Boulevard De la Gare in Casablanca.

The first Italian presence in Morocco dates back to the times of the Italian maritime republics, when many merchants of the Republic of Venice and of the Republic of Genoa settled on the Maghreb coast. This presence lasted until the 19th century. he Italian community had a notable development in French Morocco; already in the 1913 census about 3,500 Italians were registered, almost all concentrated in Casablanca, and mostly employed as excavators and construction workers. The Italian presence in the Rif, included in Spanish Morocco, was minimal, except in Tangier, an international city, where there was an important community, as evidenced by the presence of the Italian School. A further increase of Italian immigrants in Morocco was recorded after World War I, reaching 12,000 people, who were employed among the workers and as farmers, unskilled workers, bricklayers and operators. In the 1930s, Italian-Moroccans, almost all of Sicilian origin, numbered over 15,600 and lived mainly in the Maarif district of Casablanca. With decolonization, most Italian Moroccans left Morocco for France and Spain. The community has started to grow again since the 1970s and 1980s with the arrival of industrial technicians, tourism and international cooperation managers, but remains very limited.

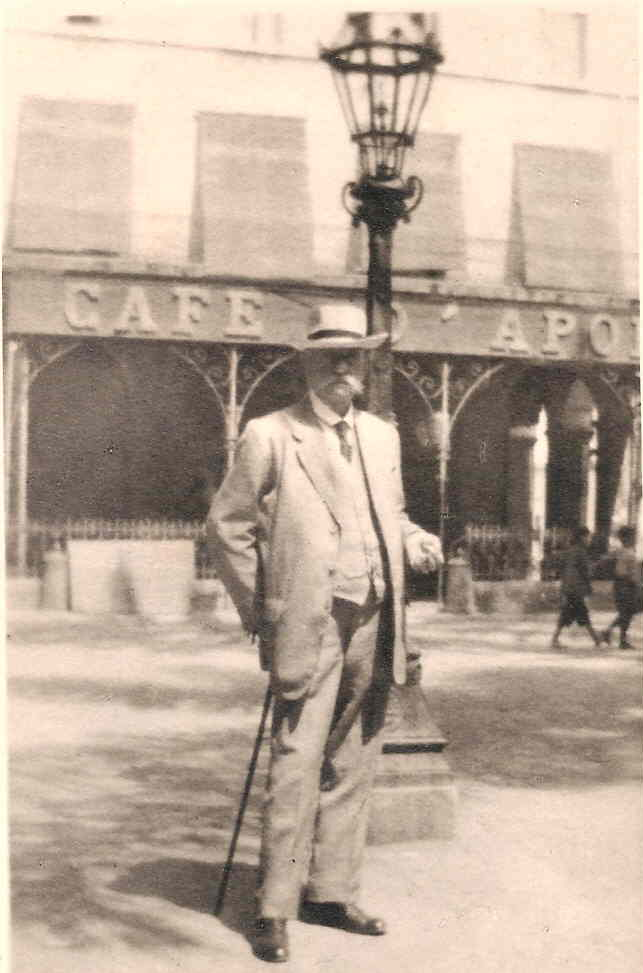
The Italian Algerian Giacomo D'Angelis, founder of the historic Hotel D'Angelis in Algiers, 1919

The first Italian presence in Algeria dates back to the times of the Italian maritime republics, when some merchants of the Republic of Venice settled on the central Maghreb coast. The first Italians took root in Algiers and in eastern Algeria, especially in Annaba and Constantine. A small minority went to Oran, where the Spanish community had been substantial for many centuries. These first Italians (estimated at 1,000) were traders and artisans, with a small presence of peasants. When France occupied Algeria in 1830, it counted over 1,100 Italians in its first census (done in 1833), concentrated in Algiers and in Annaba. With the arrival of the French, the migratory flow from Italy grew considerably: in 1836 the Italians had grown to 1,800, to 8,100 in 1846, to 9,000 in 1855, to 12,000 in 1864 and to 16,500 in 1866. Italians were an important community among foreigners in Algeria. In 1889, French citizenship was granted to foreign residents, mostly settlers from Spain or Italy, so as to unify all European settlers (pieds-noirs) in the political consensus for an "Algérie française". The French wanted to increase the European numerical presence in the recently conquered Algeria, and at the same time limit and prevent the aspirations of Italian colonialism in neighboring Tunisia and possibly also in Algeria. As a consequence, the Italian community in Algeria began to decline, going from 44,000 in 1886, to 39,000 in 1891 and to 35,000 in 1896. In the 1906 census, 12,000 Italians in Algeria were registered as naturalized Frenchmen, demonstrating a very different attitude from that of the Italian Tunisians, much more sensitive to the irredentist bond with the motherland. After World War II, Italian Algerians followed the fate of the French pieds-noirs, especially in the years of the Algerian War, repatriating massively to Italy. Still in the 1960s, immediately after Algeria's independence from France, the Italian community had a consistency of about 18,000 people, almost all residing in the capital, a number that dropped to 500-600 people in a short time.

Italian settlers also stayed in Portuguese colonies in Africa (Angola and Mozambique) after World War II. As the Portuguese government had sought to enlarge the small Portuguese population settled there through emigration from Europe, the Italian migrants gradually assimilated into the Angolan and Mozambican Portuguese community.

=== Americas ===
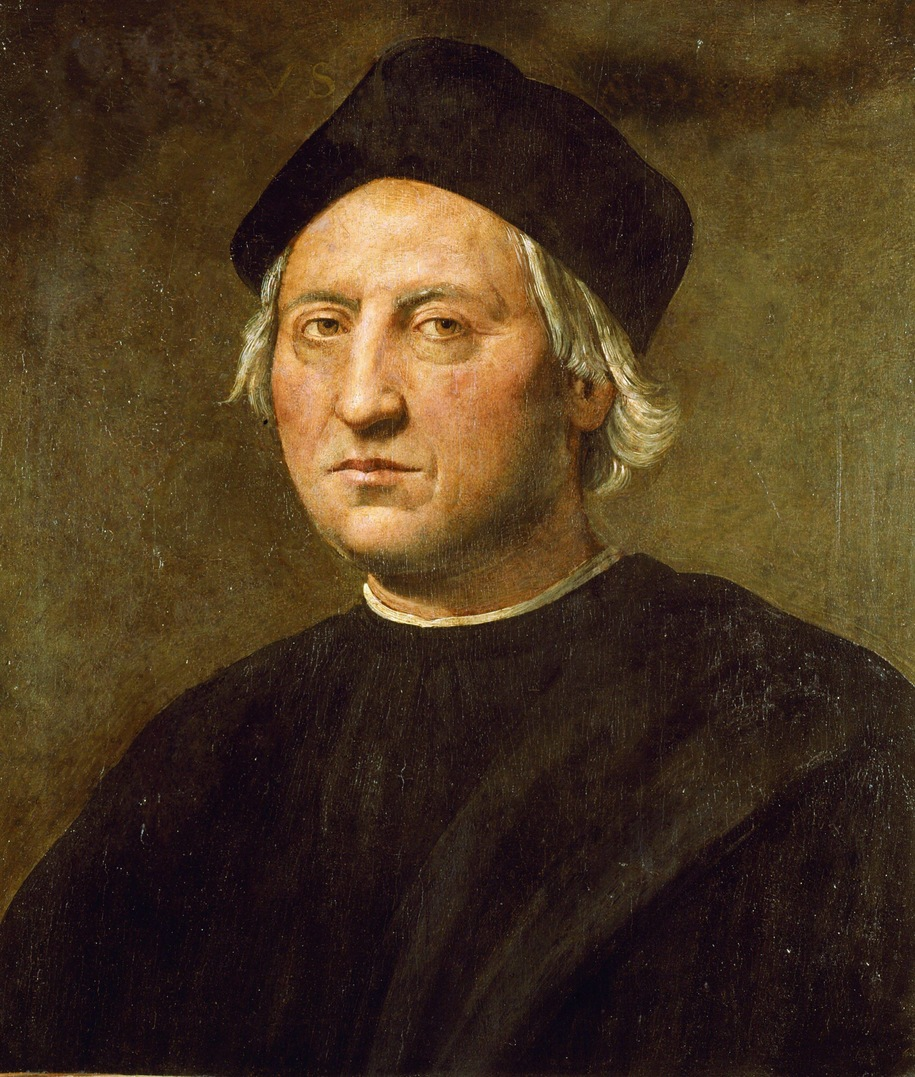
Christopher Columbus (Italian: Cristoforo Colombo), the Italian explorer who opened the way for the widespread European exploration and colonization of the Americas

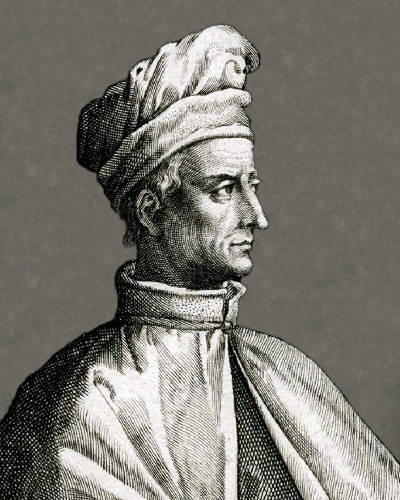
Amerigo Vespucci, the Italian explorer from whose name the term "America" is derived

Italian navigators and explorers played a key role in the exploration and settlement of the Americas by Europeans. Genoese explorer Christopher Columbus (Italian: Cristoforo Colombo [kriˈstɔːforo koˈlombo]) completed four voyages across the Atlantic Ocean for the Catholic Monarchs of Spain, opening the way for the widespread European exploration and colonization of the Americas. Another Italian, John Cabot (Italian: Giovanni Caboto [dʒoˈvanni kaˈbɔːto]), together with his son Sebastian, explored the eastern seaboard of North America for Henry VII in the early 16th century. Amerigo Vespucci, sailing for Portugal, who first demonstrated in about 1501 that the New World (in particular Brazil) was not Asia as initially conjectured, but a fourth continent previously unknown to people of the Old World: America is named after him. In 1524 the Florentine explorer Giovanni da Verrazzano was the first European to map the Atlantic coast of today's United States, and to enter New York Bay. A number of Italian navigators and explorers in the employ of Spain and France were involved in exploring and mapping their territories, and in establishing settlements; but this did not lead to the permanent presence of Italians in America.

The first Italians that headed to the Americas settled in the territories of the Spanish Empire as early as the 16th century. They were mainly Ligurians from the Republic of Genoa, who worked in activities and businesses related to transoceanic maritime navigation. The flow in the Río de la Plata region grew in the 1830s, when substantial Italian colonies arose in the cities of Buenos Aires and Montevideo.

The Italian immigration to Argentina and Uruguay, along with the Spaniards, formed the backbone of the Argentine and Uruguayan societies. Minor groups of Italians started to emigrate to Argentina and Uruguay as early as the second half of the 17th century. However, the stream of Italian immigration became a mass phenomenon between 1880 and 1920 when Italy was facing social and economic disturbances. Platinean culture has significant connections to Italian culture in terms of language, customs and traditions. It is estimated that up to 62.5% of the population, or 25 million Argentines, have full or partial Italian ancestry, whereas a study in 1976 estimated that 1,500,000 Uruguayans, or 44% of the population, are of Italian descent. Italian is the largest single ethnic origin of modern Argentines, surpassing even the descendants of Spanish immigrants. According to the Ministry of the Interior of Italy, there are 527,570 Italian citizens living in the Argentine Republic, including Argentines with dual citizenship. After the unification of Italy, Uruguay saw over 110,000 Italian emigrants, reaching its peak in the last decades of the 19th century. In the early 20th century, the migratory flow began to run out. The maximum concentration is found, as well as in Montevideo, in the city of Paysandú (where almost 65% of the inhabitants are of Italian origin).

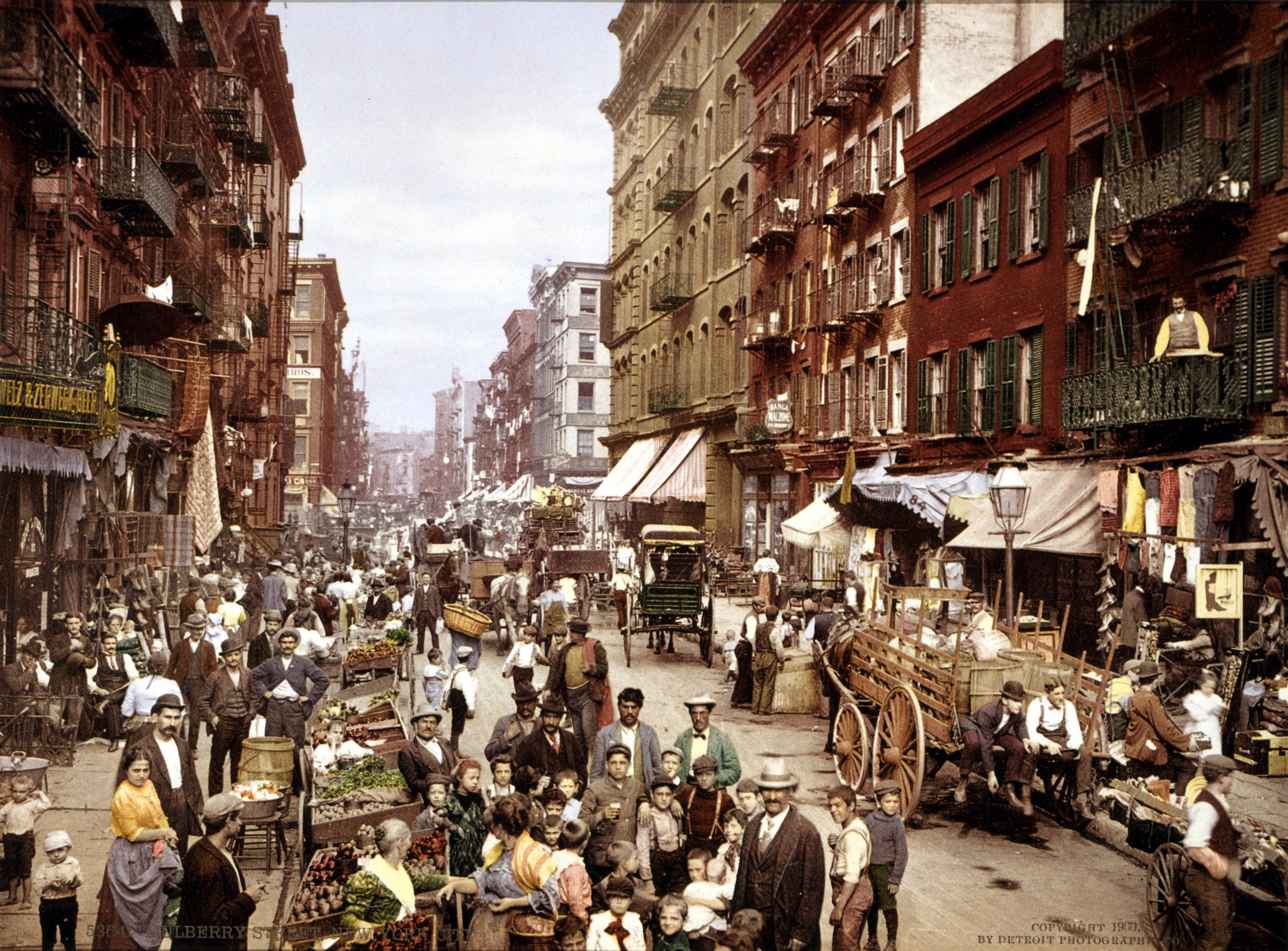
Mulberry Street, along which New York City's Little Italy is centered, circa 1900, United States

The symbolic starting date of Italian emigration to the Americas is considered to be 28 June 1854 when, after a twenty-six day journey from Palermo, the steamship Sicilia arrived in the port of New York City. For the first time, a steamship flying the flag of a state on the Italian peninsula, in this case the Kingdom of the Two Sicilies, reached the US coasts. Two years earlier, the Transatlantic Steam Navigation Company with the New World had been founded in Genoa, the main shareholder of which was King Victor Emmanuel II of Piedmont-Sardinia. The aforementioned association commissioned the large twin steamships Genova and Torino to the Blackwall shipyards, launched respectively on 12 April and 21 May 1856, both destined for the maritime connection between Italy and the Americas. Emigration to the Americas was of considerable size from the second half of the 19th century to the first decades of the 20th century. It nearly ran out during Fascism, but had a small revival soon after the end of World War II. Mass Italian emigration to the Americas ended in the 1960s, after the Italian economic miracle, although it continued until the 1980s in Canada and the United States.

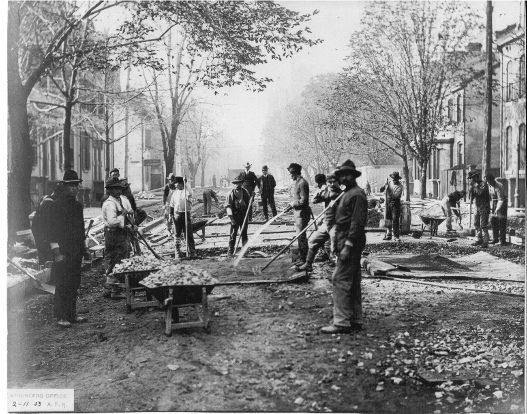
Italian immigrants lay cobblestones on King Street in Toronto, Canada, 1903.

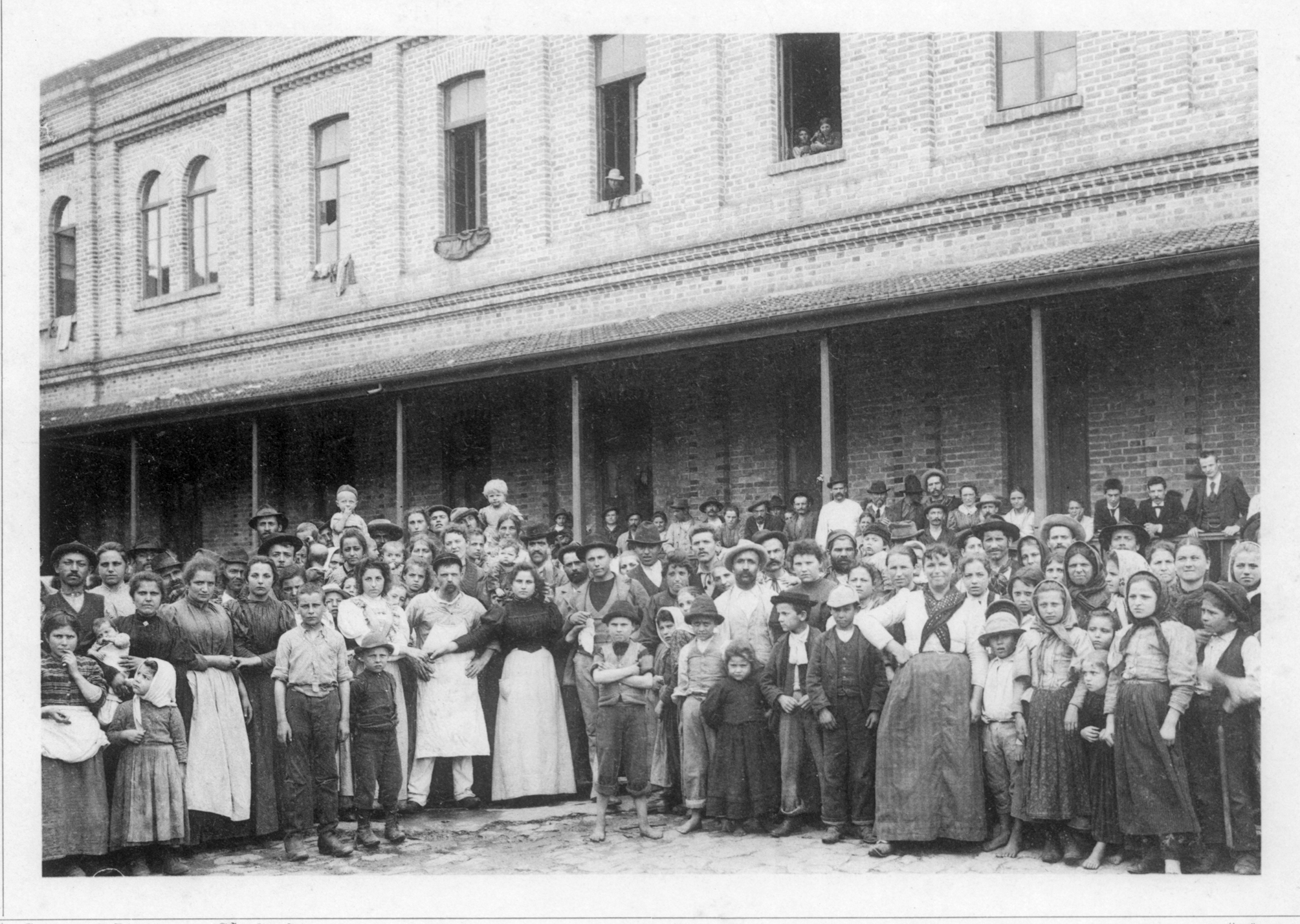
Italian immigrants arriving in São Paulo, circa 1890, Brazil. The South American country has the largest number of people with full or partial Italian ancestry outside Italy, with São Paulo as the most populous city with Italian ancestry in the world.

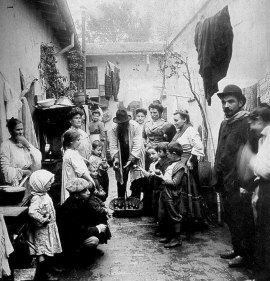
Italian immigrants in a conventillo in Buenos Aires, Argentina. Italian is the largest single ethnic origin of modern Argentines (62.5% of the country's population), surpassing even the descendants of Spanish immigrants.

Italian Brazilians are the largest number of people with full or partial Italian ancestry outside Italy, with São Paulo as the most populous city with Italian ancestry in the world. Nowadays, it is possible to find millions of descendants of Italians, from the southeastern state of Minas Gerais to the southernmost state of Rio Grande do Sul, with the majority living in São Paulo state and the highest percentage in the southeastern state of Espírito Santo (60-75%). Small southern Brazilian towns, such as Nova Veneza, have as much as 95% of their population as people with Italian descent.

A substantial influx of Italian immigrants to Canada began in the early 20th century when over 60,000 Italians moved to Canada between 1900 and 1913. Approximately 40,000 Italians came to Canada during the interwar period between 1914 and 1918, predominantly from southern Italy where an economic depression and overpopulation had left many families in poverty. Between the early-1950s and the mid-1960s, approximately 20,000 to 30,000 Italians emigrated to Canada each year. Pier 21 in Halifax, Nova Scotia, was an influential port of Italian immigration between 1928 until it ceased operations in 1971, where 471,940 individuals came to Canada from Italy making them the third-largest ethnic group to emigrate to Canada during that time period. Almost 1,000,000 Italians reside in the Province of Ontario, making it a strong global representation of the Italian diaspora. For example, Hamilton, Ontario, has around 24,000 residents with ties to its sister city Racalmuto in Sicily. The city of Vaughan, just north of Toronto, and the town of King, just north of Vaughan, have the two largest concentrations of Italians in Canada at 26.5% and 35.1% of the total population of each community respectively.

From the late 19th century until the 1930s, the United States was a main destination for Italian immigrants, with most first settling in the New York metropolitan area, but with other major Italian American communities developing in Boston, Philadelphia, Chicago, Cleveland, Detroit, St. Louis, Pittsburgh, Baltimore, San Francisco, Providence, and New Orleans. Most Italian immigrants to the United States came from the Southern regions of Italy, namely Campania, Apulia, Basilicata, Calabria, and Sicily. Many of them coming to the United States were also small landowners. Between 1880 and 1914, more than 4 million Italians immigrated to the United States. Italian Americans are known for their tight-knit communities and ethnic pride, and have been highly influential in the development of modern U.S. culture, particularly in the Northeastern region of the country. Italian American communities have often been depicted in U.S. film and television, with distinct Italian-influenced dialects of English prominently spoken by many characters. Although many do not speak Italian fluently, over a million still speak Italian at home, according to the 2000 US Census. According to the Italian American Studies Association, the population of the Italian Americans is about 18 million, corresponding to about 5.4% of the total population of the United States.

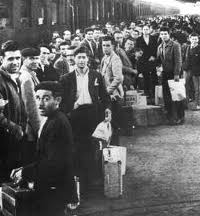
Italians arriving in Colombia.

The presence of Italians in Colombia began from the times of Christopher Columbus and Amerigo Vespucci. Martino Galeano (member of the noble Galeano Family of Genoa) was one of the most important conquerors of the territory of present-day Colombia (New Kingdom of Granada). These early Italians have left their mark in many lines of the Colombian colonial society, creating national symbols like the country map, the National Hymn and the Capitol, and were present in almost all higher levels of Colombian society, like Juan Dionisio Gamba, the son of a merchant from Genoa who was president of Colombia in 1812. In the mid-19th century, many Italians arrived in Colombia from South Italy (especially from the province of Salerno, and the areas of Basilicata and Calabria), and arrived on the north coast of Colombia: Barranquilla was the first center affected by this mass migration. One of the first complete maps of Colombia, adopted today with some modifications, was prepared earlier by another Italian, Agustino Codazzi, who arrived in Bogota in 1849. The Colonel Agustin Codazzi also proposed the establishment of an agricultural colony of Italians, on model of what was done with the Colonia Tovar in Venezuela, but some factors prevented it. Prior to World War I, Italians were concentrated in the Caribbean coast surrounding Barranquilla, Cartagena and Santa Marta as well as in Bogotá, many of which had married women of the Colombian high society and of Spanish lineage. Following World War II, Italian migration shifted towards the capital, Cali and Medellín, and was mostly made up of North Italian origin (Liguria, Piedmont, Tuscany and Lombardy). It is estimated that more than 2 million Colombians are of direct Italian ancestry, corresponding to about 4% of the total population.

Another very conspicuous Italian community is in Venezuela, which developed especially after World War II. There are about 5 million Venezuelans with at least one Italian ancestor, corresponding to more than 6% of the total population. Italo-Venezuelans have achieved significant results in modern Venezuelan society. The Italian embassy estimates that a quarter of Venezuelan industries not related to the oil sector are directly or indirectly owned and/or operated by Italo-Venezuelans.

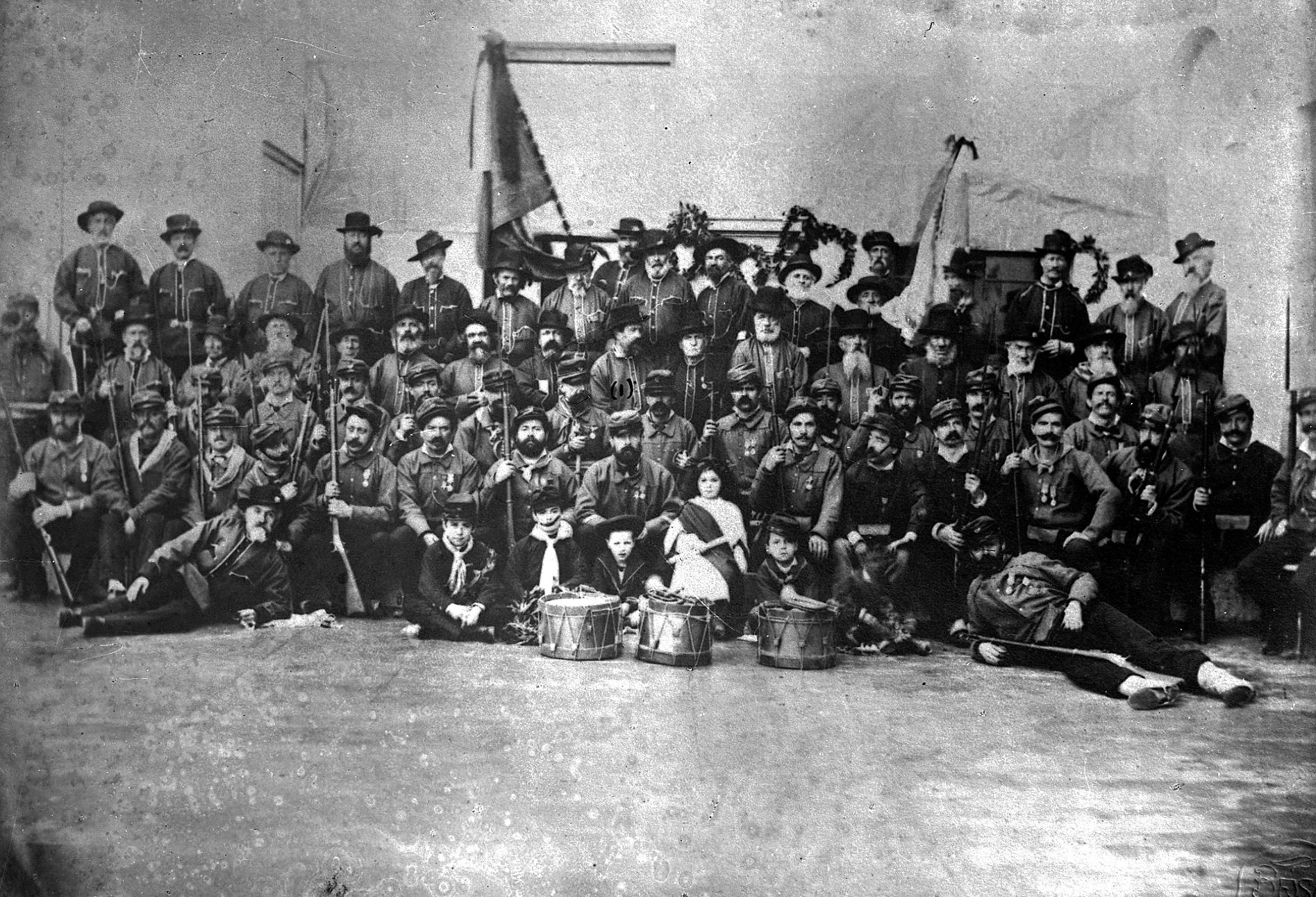
Italian immigrants in Uruguay

Many Italian-Mexicans live in cities founded by their ancestors in the states of Veracruz (Huatusco) and San Luis Potosí. Smaller numbers of Italian-Mexicans live in Guanajuato and the State of Mexico, and the former haciendas (now cities) of Nueva Italia, Michoacán and Lombardia, Michoacán, both founded by Dante Cusi from Gambar in Brescia. Playa del Carmen, Mahahual and Cancún in the state of Quintana Roo have also received a significant number of immigrants from Italy. Several families of Italian-Mexican descent were granted citizenship in the United States under the Bracero program to address a labor shortage. Italian companies have invested in Mexico, mostly in the tourism and hospitality industries. These ventures have sometimes resulted in settlements, and residents live primarily in the resort areas of the Riviera Maya, Baja California, Puerto Vallarta and Cancún.

Italian immigration to Paraguay has been one of the largest migration flows this South American country has received. Italians in Paraguay are the second-largest immigrant group in the country after the Spaniards. The Italian embassy calculates that nearly 40% of the Paraguayans have recent and distant Italian roots: about 2,500,000 Paraguayans are descendants of Italian emigrants to Paraguay. Over the years, many descendants of Italian immigrants came to occupy important positions in the public life of the country, such as the presidency of the republic, the vice-presidency, local administrations and congress.

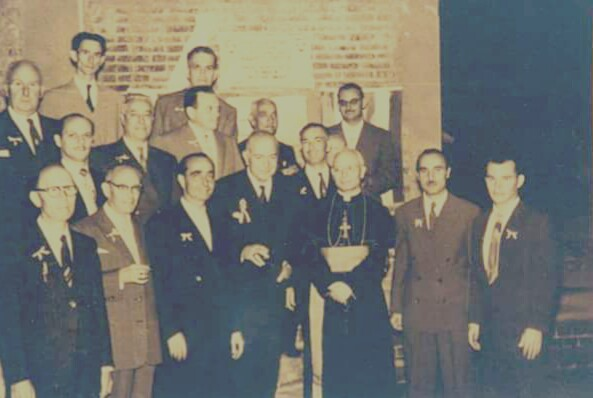
Some Italian immigrants in Costa Rica in the first half of the 20th century

Most of Italian Costa Ricans reside in San Vito, the capital city of the Coto Brus Canton. Both Italians and their descendants are referred to in the country as tútiles. In the 1920s and 1930s, the Italian community grew in importance, even because some Italo-Costa Ricans reached top levels in the political arena. Julio Acosta García, a descendant from a Genoese family in San Jose since colonial times, served as President of Costa Rica from 1920 to 1924.

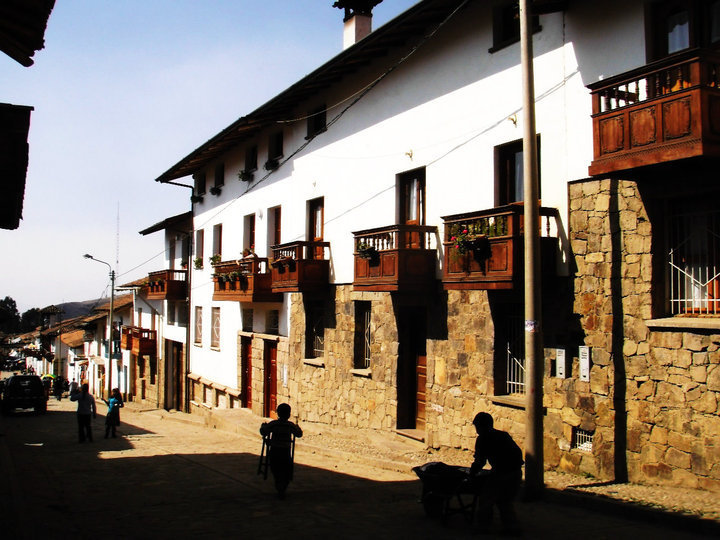
Lombard style Italian houses in Chacas, Ancash, Peru

Among European Peruvians, Italian Peruvians were the second largest group of immigrants to settle in the country. The first wave of Italian immigration to an independent Peru occurred during the period 1840–1866 (the "Guano" Era): not less than 15,000 Italians arrived to Peru during this period (without counting the non-registered Italians) and established mainly in the coastal cities, especially, in Lima and Callao. They came, mostly, from the northern states (Liguria, Piedmont, Tuscany and Lombardy). Giuseppe Garibaldi arrived to Peru in 1851, as well as other Italians who participated in the Milan rebellion like Giuseppe Eboli, Steban Siccoli, Antonio Raimondi, Arrigoni, etc.

Italian immigrants to Chile settled especially in Capitán Pastene, Angol, Lumaco, and Temuco but also in Valparaíso, Concepción, Chillán, Valdivia, and Osorno. One of the notable Italian influences in Chile is, for example, the sizable number of Italian surnames of a proportion of Chilean politicians, businessmen, and intellectuals, many of whom intermarried into the Castilian-Basque elites. Italian Chileans contributed to the development, cultivation and ownership of the world-famous Chilean wines from haciendas in the Central Valley, since the first wave of Italians arrived in colonial Chile in the early 19th century.

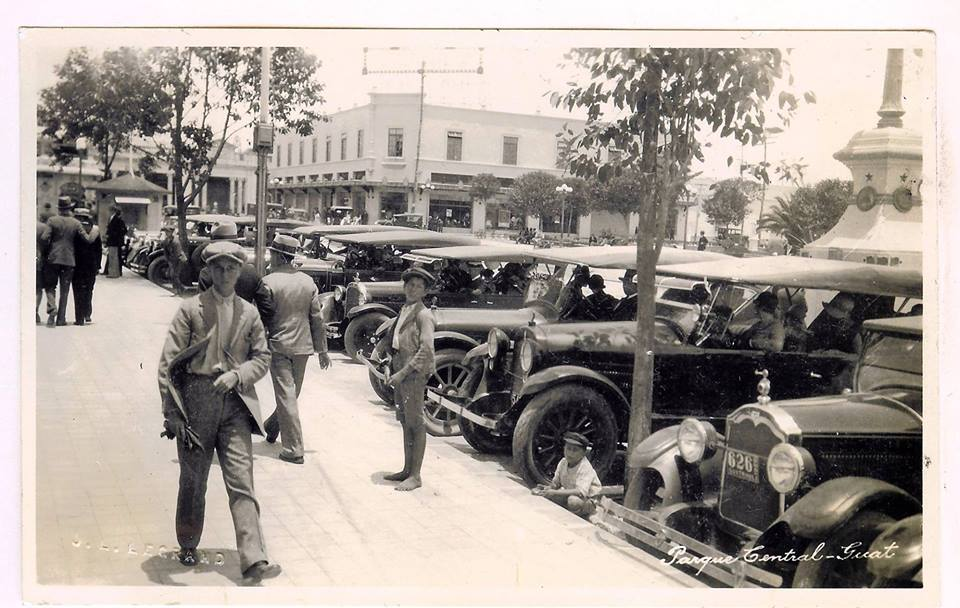
Italians in the central park of Guatemala City (1900)

The Italian immigration in Guatemala began in a consistent way only in the early Republican era. One of the first Italians to come to Guatemala was Geronimo Mancinelli, an Italian coffee farmer who lived in San Marcos (Guatemala) in 1847. However, the first wave of Italian immigrants came in 1873, under the government of Justo Rufino Barrios, these immigrants were mostly farmers attracted by the wealth of natural and spacious highlands of Guatemala. Most of them settled in Quetzaltenango and Guatemala City.

Italian emigration into Cuba was minor (a few thousand emigrates) in comparison with other waves of Italian emigration to the Americas (millions went to Argentina, Venezuela, Brazil and the United States). Only in the mid-19th century did there develop a small Italian community in Cuba: they were mostly people of culture, architects, engineers, painters and artists and their families.

Italian Dominicans have left its mark on the history of the Caribbean country. The foundation of the oldest Dominican newspaper in 1889 was the work of an Italian, while the establishment of the Navy of the Dominican Republic was the work of the Genoese merchant Giovanni Battista Cambiaso. Finally, the design of the Palace of the President of the Dominican Republic, both aesthetically and structurally, was the work of an Italian engineer, Guido D'Alessandro. In 2010, Dominicans of Italian descent numbered around 300,000 (corresponding to about 3% of the total population of the Dominican Republic), while Italian citizens residing in the Caribbean nation numbered around 50,000, mainly concentrated in Boca Chica, Santiago de los Caballeros, La Romana and in the capital Santo Domingo. The Italian community in the Dominican Republic, considering both people of Italian ancestry and Italian birth, is the largest in the Caribbean region.

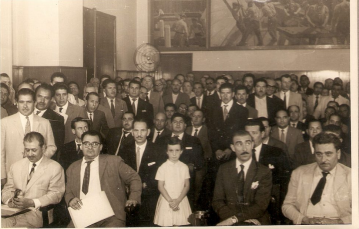
Italian Salvadorans at the beginning of the 20th century

Italian Salvadorans are one of the largest European communities in El Salvador, and one of the largest in Central America and the Caribbean, as well as one of those with the greatest social and cultural weight of America. Italians have strongly influenced Salvadoran society and participated in the construction of the country's identity. Italian culture is distinguished by infrastructure, gastronomy, education, dance, and other distinctions, there being several notable Salvadorans of Italian descent. As of 2009, the Italian community in El Salvador is officially made up of 2,300 Italian citizens, while Salvadoran citizens with Italian descent exceed 200,000.

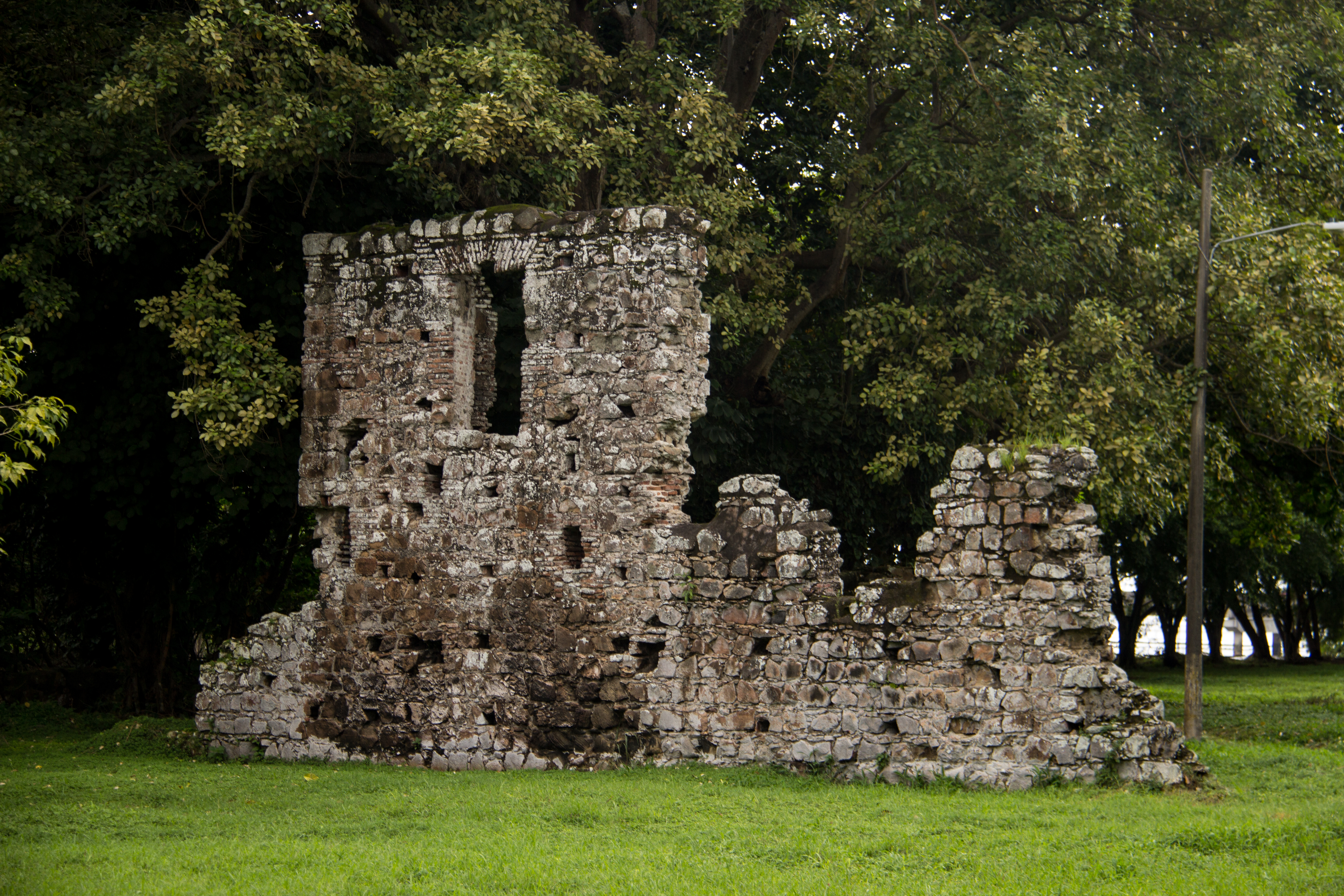
The "Casa de los Genoveses" ("house of Genoans") in Panama Viejo

Italian Panamanians are mainly descendant of Italians attracted by the construction of the Panama Canal, between the 19th and 20th century. The wave of Italian immigration occurred around 1880. With the construction of the Canal by the Universal Panama Canal Company came the arrival of up to 2,000 Italians. Actually there it is an agreement/treaty between the Italian and Panamanian governments, that facilitates since 1966 the Italian immigration to Panama for investments

In 2010, there were over 15,000 Bolivians of Italian descent, while there were around 2,700 Italian citizens. One of the most famous Italian Bolivian is the writer and poet Óscar Cerruto, considered one of the great authors of Bolivian literature. There are currently almost 56,000 descendants of Italians in Ecuador, being one of the lowest rates of migrant ancestry in Ecuador, where Arabs and Spaniards play a more prominent role. However, Argentine and Colombian immigrants who have entered the country since the end of the last century (80% and 50% respectively were made up of Italian descendants).

The business sector of Haiti, was controlled by German and Italian immigrants in the mid-19th century. In 1908 there were 160 Italians residing in Haiti, according to the Italian consul De Matteis, of whom 128 lived in the capital Port-au-Prince. In 2011, according to the Italian census, there were 134 Italians who were resident in Haiti, nearly all of them living in the capital. However, there were nearly 5,000 Haitians with recent & distant Italians roots (according to the Italian embassy). In 2010, Puerto Ricans of Italian descent numbered around 10,000, while Italian citizens residing in Puerto Rico are 344, concentrated in Ponce and San Juan. In addition, there is also an Italian Honorary Consulate in San Juan.

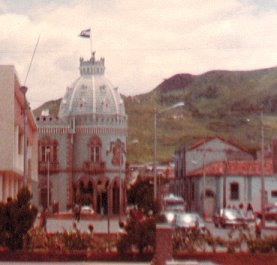
Former Presidential House of Honduras from 1924 to 1989, built by Italian Honduran architect Augusto Bressani

The influx of Italian citizens to settle in the Republic of Honduras became evident within the first three decades of the 20th century. Among them stood out businessmen, architects, aviators, engineers, artists in various fields, etc. In 1911 the participation of immigrants in the development of the country began to be evident, especially families from Europe (Germany, Italy, France). The main marketing items were coffee, bananas, precious woods, gold and silver. In 2014, there were about 14,000 Hondurans of Italian descent, while there were around 400 Italian citizens.

Italian emigration to Nicaragua occurred from the 1880s until World War II. Emigration was not consistent as there were only several hundred Italians who emigrated to Nicaragua, therefore with much lower numbers than the Italian emigration to other countries. However, Italian emigration to Nicaragua was substantial if the other ethnic groups who emigrated to the South American country is considered, as well as the direct migratory flow to other Central American countries. Another aspect to consider was the density of the Nicaraguan population of the time with respect to its territory, which was not very high, thus making the Italian presence, and more generally the presence of foreign citizens in Nicaragua, more significant.

=== Asia ===
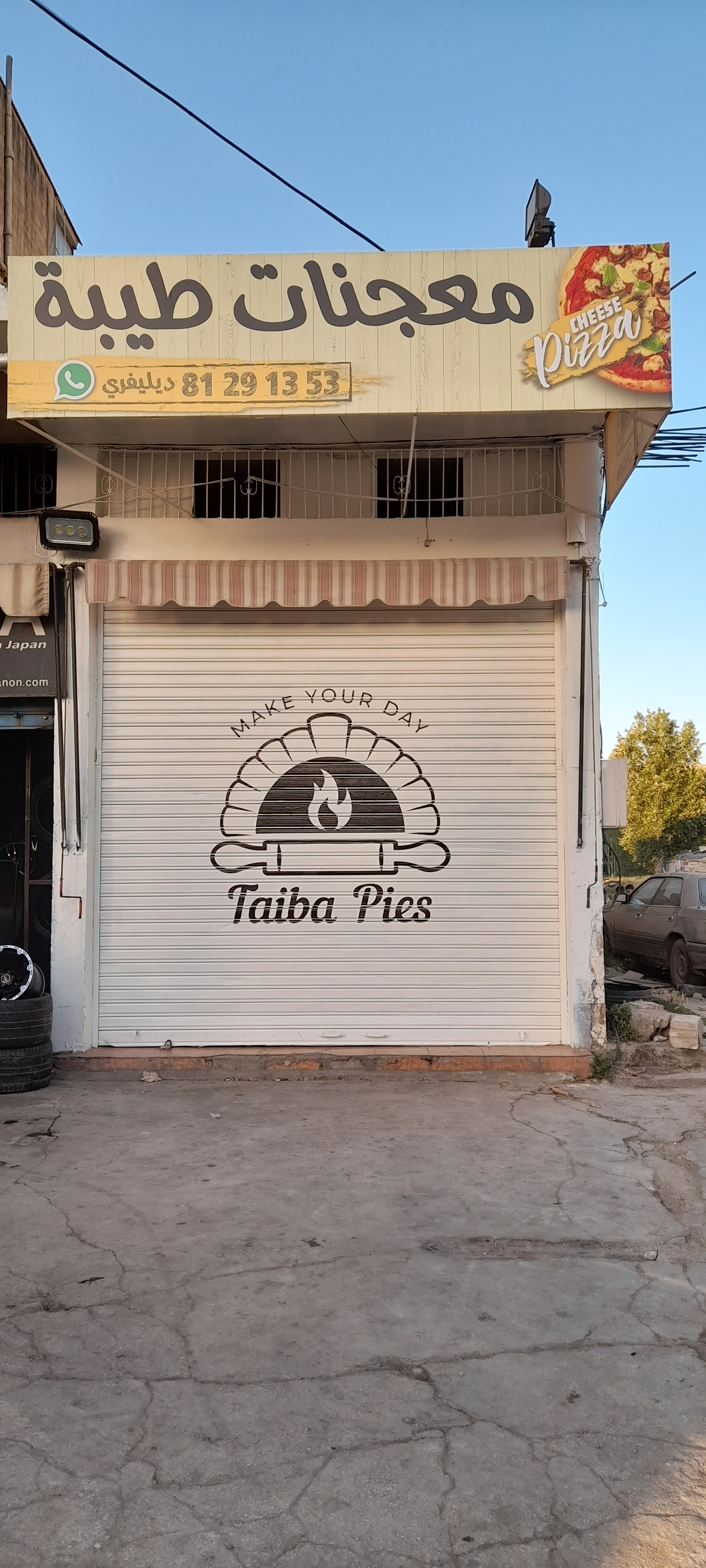
Takeaway pizzeria in an Arabic Country

There is a small Italian community in India consisting mainly of Indian citizens of Italian heritage as well with expatriates and migrants from Italy who reside in India. Since the 16th century, many of these Italian Jesuits came to South India, mainly Goa, Kerala and Tamil Nadu. Some of the most well known Jesuits in India include Antonio Moscheni, Constanzo Beschi, Roberto de Nobili and Rodolfo Acquaviva. In the 1940s, during World War II, the British brought Italian prisoners of war, who were captured in either Europe or North Africa, to Bangalore and Madras. They were put up at the Garrison Grounds, today's Parade Grounds-Cubbon Road area. In February 1941, about 2,200 Italian prisoners of war arrived in Bangalore by a special train and marched to internment camps at Byramangala, 20 miles from Bangalore. In recent years, many Italians have been coming to India for business purposes. Today, Italy is India's fifth largest trading partner in the European Union. There are currently between 15,000 and 20,000 Italian nationals in India based mostly in South India. The city of Mumbai itself has a sizeable number of Italians and some in Chennai.

Italians in Japan consists of Italian migrants that come to Japan, as well as the descendants. In December 2023, there were 5,243 Italians living in Japan. The first settlements of Italians began in the 19th century when the Jesuit missionaries came to Japan. Since the late 20th century many Italian workers came to Japan as a student, businessman or as a factory worker. There are also many Italians who work for Italian restaurants, but many Italian restaurants in Japan are led by Japanese chefs and cooks and some Italians works as an assistant for them. The Italian population in Japan is currently increasing due to the popularity of Japanese culture and is one of the fastest growing European community in Japan. There are also many Italian institutions for the Italian community and few Italian language schools for Japanese people.

Italians in Lebanon (or Italian Lebanese) are a community in Lebanon with a history that goes back to Roman times. In more recent times the Italians came to Lebanon in small groups during the World War I and World War II, trying to escape the wars at that time in Europe. Some of the first Italians who choose Lebanon as a place to settle and find a refuge were Italian soldiers from the Italo-Turkish War in 1911 to 1912. Also most of the Italians chose to settle in Beirut, because of its European style of life. Only a few Italians left Lebanon for France after independence. The Italian community in Lebanon is very small (about 4,300 people) and it is mostly assimilated into the Lebanese Catholic community.

There are up to 10,000 Italians in the United Arab Emirates, approximately two-thirds of whom are in Dubai, and the rest in Abu Dhabi. The UAE in recent years has attained the status of a favourite destination for Italian immigrants, with the rate of Italians moving into the country having increased by forty percent between 2005 and 2007. Italians make up one of the largest European groups in the UAE. The community is structured through numerous social circles and organisations such as the Italian Cultural and Recreational Circle (now known as "Cicer"), the Italian Industry and Commerce Office (UAE) and the Italian Business Council Dubai. Social activities like outdoor excursions, gastronomy evenings, language courses, activities for children, exhibitions and concerts are frequent; there have been talks of setting up a permanent Italian cultural centre in Abu Dhabi which would act as a venue for activities. Italian cuisine, culture, and fashion are widespread throughout Dubai and Abu Dhabi, with a large number of native Italians running restaurants.

=== Europe ===
The Italian colonists in Albania were Italians who, between the two World Wars, moved to Albania to colonize the Balkan country for the Kingdom of Italy. When Benito Mussolini took power in Italy, he turned with renewed interest to Albania. Italy began penetrating Albania's economy in 1925, when Albania agreed to allow it to exploit its mineral resources. That was followed by the First Treaty of Tirana in 1926 and the Second Treaty of Tirana in 1927, whereby Italy and Albania entered into a defensive alliance. Italian loans subsidized the Albanian government and economy, and Italian military instructors trained the Albanian army. Italian colonial settlement was encouraged and the first 300 Italian colonists settled in Albania. Fascist Italy increased pressure on Albania in the 1930s and, on 7 April 1939, invaded Albania, five months before the start of the World War II. After the occupation of Albania in April 1939, Mussolini sent nearly 11,000 Italian colonists to Albania. Most of them were from the Veneto region and Sicily. They settled primarily in the areas of Durrës, Vlorë, Shkodër, Porto Palermo, Elbasan, and Sarandë. They were the first settlers of a huge group of Italians to be moved to Albania. In addition to these colonists, 22,000 Italian casual laborers went to Albania in April 1940 to construct roads, railways and infrastructure. After the World War II, no Italian colonists remain in Albania. The few who remained under the communist regime of Enver Hoxha fled (with their descendants) to Italy in 1992, and actually are represented by the association "ANCIFRA".

The most important migratory flows of Italians to Austria began after 1870, when the Austro-Hungarian Empire was still in existence. Between 1876 and 1900, Austria-Hungary was the second European country after France to absorb the largest number of Italian emigrants. These migratory phenomena were of an economic nature, mainly of a temporary nature, and involved agricultural labourers, workers and bricklayers. After 1907, due to the decline in requests for Italian labor by the Austro-Hungarian authorities, the rise of inter-ethnic clashes between the Italian ethnic community and the Slavic ethnic community present in the Habsburg empire (moreover fomented by the Vienna government), there was a drop in migratory flows of Italians to the country, going from over 50,000 annual entries recorded in 1901 to around 35,000 in 1912. The phenomenon of Italian emigration to Austria ended after 1918, with the dissolution of the Austro-Hungarian Empire. According to official AIRE data for 2007, there were 15,765 Italian citizens residing in Austria.

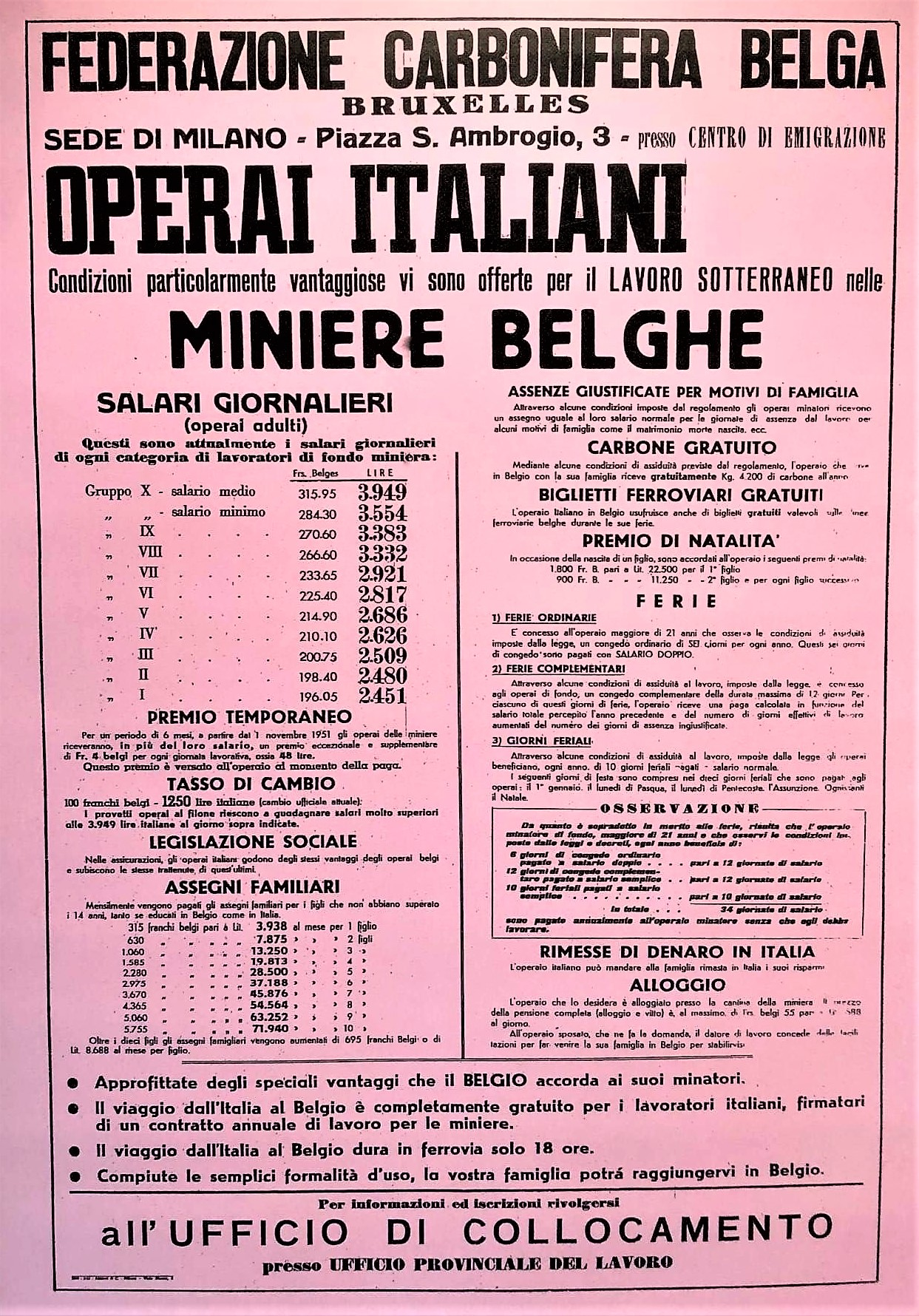
Belgian poster posted in Italy to encourage Italian immigration to Belgium

The Italian community in Belgium is very well integrated into Belgian society. The Italo-Belgians occupy roles of the utmost importance; the Queen of Belgium Paola Ruffo di Calabria or the former Prime Minister Elio Di Rupo are examples. According to official statistics from AIRE (Register of Italians residing abroad), in 2012 there were approximately 255,000 Italian citizens residing in Belgium (including Belgians with dual citizenship). According to data from the Italian consular registers, it appears that almost 50,000 Italians in Belgium (i.e. more than 25%) come from Sicily, followed by Apulia (9.5%), Abruzzo (7%), Campania (6.5%), and Veneto (6%). There are about 450,000 (about 4% of the total Belgian population) people of Italian origin in Belgium. The community of Belgians of Italian descent is said to be 85% concentrated in Wallonia and in Brussels. More precisely, 65% of Belgians of Italian descent live in Wallonia, 20% in Brussels and 15% in the Flemish Region.

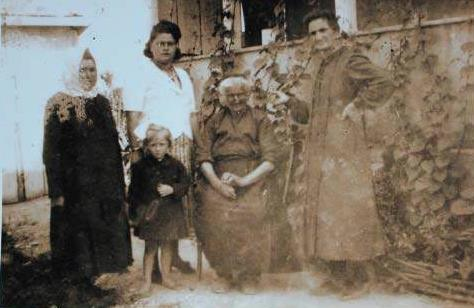
The first Italian immigrants to Štivor, Bosnia and Herzegovina, 1883

Štivor, in Bosnia and Herzegovina, is almost exclusively inhabited by descendants of Italian emigrants, which are about 92% of the total population of the village. Their number amounts to 270 people, all of Trentino origin. The Italian language is also taught in the village schools, and the 270 Italian Bosnians of Štivor have Italian passports, read Italian newspapers and live on Italian pensions. Three quarters of them still speak the Trentino dialect. The presence of Italian-Bosnians in Štivor can be explained by a flood caused by the Brenta river which hit the Valsugana in 1882. Trentino at the time was part of the Austro-Hungarian Empire, which had recently annexed Bosnia and Herzegovina. In order to help the people of Trentino devastated by the flood, and to repopulate Bosnia and Herzegovina, the Austrian authorities encouraged the emigration of Trentino people to the Balkan country. The Trentino immigrants were distributed throughout the territory of Bosnia and Herzegovina, but mainly only those in Štivor kept their identity, while the others were absorbed by the local population. The Trentino immigrants brought an important tradition to Bosnia and Herzegovina, the cultivation of grapevines and the production of wine, a tradition that is still practiced in the Balkan country.

Italian migration to France has occurred, in different migrating cycles since the end of the 19th century to the present day. In addition, Corsica passed from the Republic of Genoa to France in 1770, and the area around Nice and Savoy from the Kingdom of Sardinia to France in 1860. Initially, Italian immigration to modern France (late 18th to the early 20th centuries) came predominantly from northern Italy (Piedmont, Veneto), then from central Italy (Marche, Umbria), mostly to the bordering southeastern region of Provence. It was not until after World War II that large numbers of immigrants from southern Italy emigrated to France, usually settling in industrialized areas of France such as Lorraine, Paris and Lyon. Today, it is estimated that as many as 5,000,000 French nationals have Italian ancestry going as far back as three generations.

Italian colonists were settled in the Dodecanese Islands of the Aegean Sea in the 1930s by the Fascist Italian government of Benito Mussolini, Italy having been in occupation of the Islands since the Italian-Turkish War of 1911. By 1940, the number of Italians settled in the Dodecanese was almost 8,000, concentrated mainly in Rhodes. In 1947, after the Second World War, the islands came into the possession of Greece: as a consequence most of the Italians were forced to emigrate and all of the Italian schools were closed. Some of the Italian colonists remained in Rhodes and were quickly assimilated. Currently, only a few dozen old colonists remain, but the influence of their legacy is evident in the relative diffusion of the Italian language mainly in Rhodes and Leros. However, their architectural legacy is still evident, especially in Rhodes and Leros. The citadel of Rhodes city is a UNESCO World Heritage Site thanks in great part to the large-scale restoration work carried out by the Italian authorities.

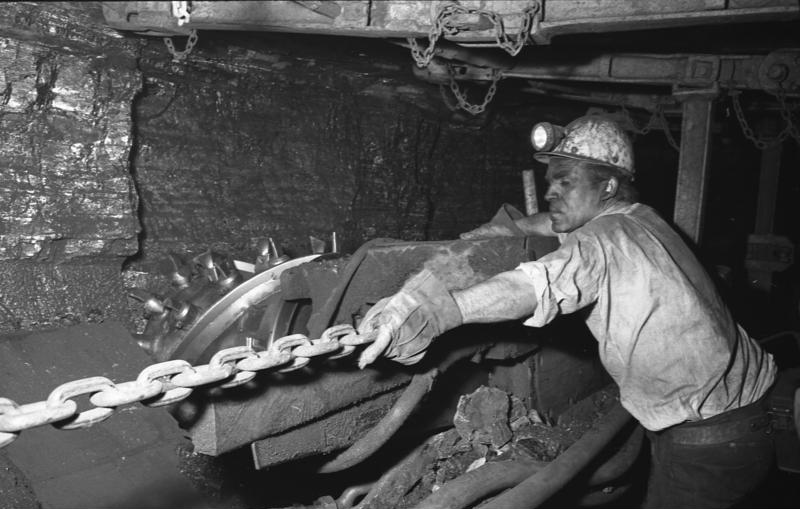
Italian worker in a mine near Duisburg, in Germany, in 1962

In the 1890s, Germany transformed from a country of emigration to a country of immigration. Starting from this period the migratory flows from Italy expanded (mostly coming from Friuli, Lombardy, Veneto and Emilia-Romagna), and with them the numerical consistency of the Italian communities increased. In fact, it went from 4,000 Italians in 1871 to over 120,000 registered in 1910. Italian immigration to Germany resumed after the rise to power of Nazism in 1933. This time, however, it was not a voluntary migration, but a forced recruitment of Italian workers, based on an agreement stipulated in 1937 between Adolf Hitler and Benito Mussolini, to satisfy the need to find cheap labor for German factories in exchange for the supply of coal to Italy. On 20 December 1955, a bilateral agreement was signed between Italy and West Germany for the recruitment and placement of Italian labor in German companies. From that date there was a boom in migratory flows towards West Germany, which were much more conspicuous than those that had occurred between the end of the 19th century and the beginning of the 20th century. It is estimated that from 1956 to 1976 over 4 million Italians entered West Germany, 3.5 million of whom later returned to Italy.

The first Italians in Luxembourg arrived in 1892, and at the end of the 19th century the Italian community numbered only 439 people, but already in 1900 the Italian community rose to 7,000 people and then to 10,000 only ten years later. The Italian emigrants worked above all in the mines and in the steel industry of the country (as in neighboring Belgium) until their closure, while today the Italian community is employed in the tertiary sector, especially banks. In 1960, Italians constituted 37.8% of all foreign residents in Luxembourg (against only 8.2% in 2011). The historical peak of the Italian community was in 1970, when the Italians in Luxembourg numbered 23,490, or as much as 6.9% of the entire population of the Grand Duchy. The most important Italian-Luxembourg was the politician and trade unionist Luigi Reich who, from 1985 to 1993, was mayor of Dudelange and national vice-president of the Confédération générale du travail luxembourgeoise (CGT-L). On 1 January 2011, according to AIRE, there were 22,965 Italians in Luxembourg (equal to 4.8% of the Luxembourg population) and almost a quarter of the emigrants are of Apulian origin.

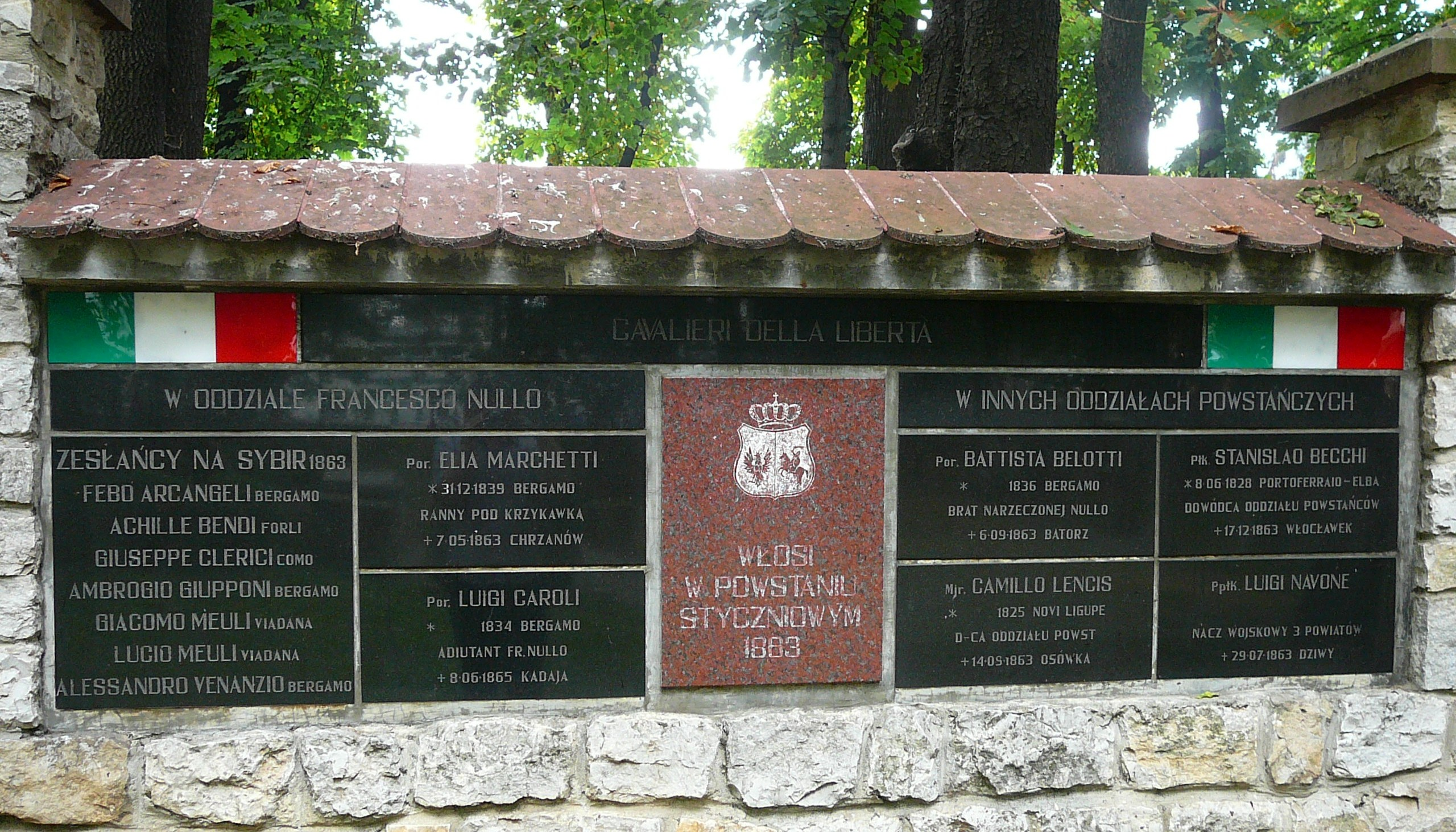
Memorial to Italian volunteers who fought in the Polish January Uprising of 1863–1864, Olkusz, Poland

The first Italians came to Poland in the Middle Ages, however, substantial migration of Italians to Poland began in the 16th century. Those included merchants, craftsmen, architects, artists, physicians, inventors, engineers, diplomats, chefs. Famous Italians in Poland included inventors Tito Livio Burattini, Paolo del Buono, architects Bartolommeo Berrecci, Bernardo Morando, painters Tommaso Dolabella, Bernardo Bellotto, Marcello Bacciarelli, scholar Filippo Buonaccorsi, and religious reformer Fausto Sozzini. The largest number of Italians lived in Kraków, while other significant concentrations were in Gdańsk, Lwów, Poznań, Warsaw and Wilno. According to the 1921 Polish census, the largest Italian populations lived in the cities of Warsaw and Lwów with 100 and 22 people, respectively. In the 2011 Polish census, 8,641 people declared Italian nationality, of which 7,548 declared both Polish and Italian nationality.

In recent years a growing Italian community has also emerged in Portugal. Now the country hosts more than 34,000 Italian nationals and almost 400 Italians have acquires the Portuguese citizenship since 2008. Many of the Italians living in Portugal are Italian-Brazilians who have taken advantage of their EU citizenship and subsequently settled in a country where they already spoke the language.

Italians in Romania are people of Italian descent who reside, or have moved to Romania. During the 19th and 20th centuries, many Italians from Western Austria-Hungary settled in Transylvania. During the interwar period, some Italians settled in Dobruja. After 1880, Italians from Friuli and Veneto settled in Greci, Cataloi and Măcin in Northern Dobruja. Most of them worked in the granite quarries in the Măcin Mountains, some became farmers and others worked in road building. As an officially recognised ethnic minority, Italians have one seat reserved in the Romanian Chamber of Deputies.

Italians in Spain are one of the largest communities of immigrant groups in Spain, with 257.256 Italian citizens in the country; conversely, 142,401 residents in Spain were born in Italy. A significant part of the Italian citizens in Spain are not born in Italy but emigrate from Argentina or Uruguay.

Swedish Italians are Swedish citizens or residents of Italian ethnic, cultural and linguistic heritage or identity. There are approximately 8,126 people born in Italy living in Sweden today, as well as 10,961 people born in Sweden with at least one parent born in Italy.

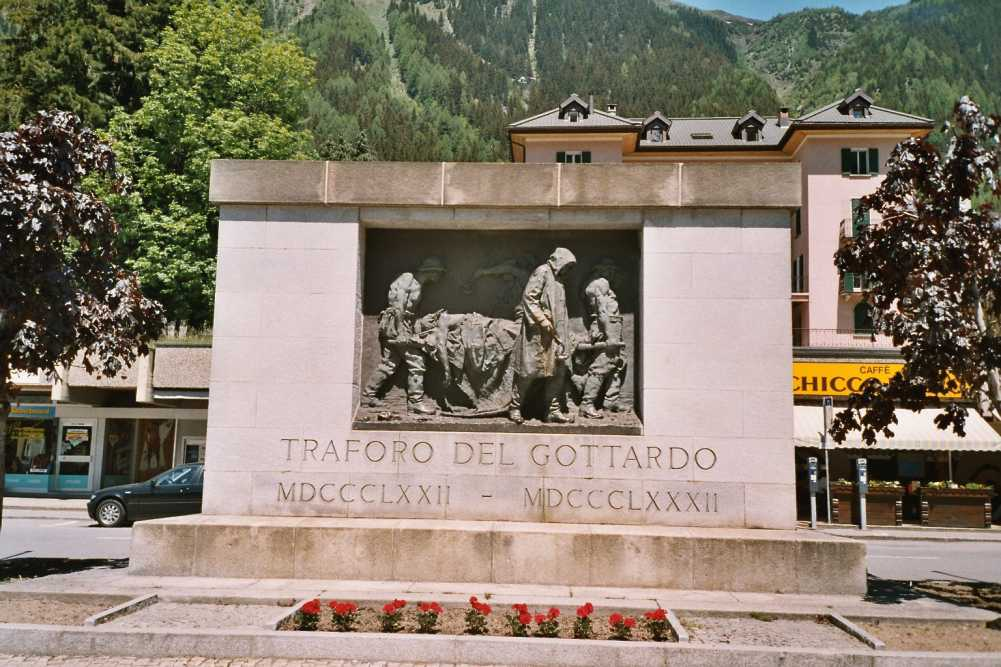
Monument to the workers—mostly Italian—who died in Switzerland during the construction of the Gotthard Tunnel

In Switzerland, Italian immigrants (not to be confused with a large autochthonous population of Italophones in Ticino and Grigioni) reached the country starting in the late 19th century, most of whom eventually returned to Italy after the rise of Italian Fascism. Future Fascist leader Benito Mussolini emigrated to Switzerland in 1902, only to be deported after becoming involved in the socialist movement. A new migratory wave began after 1945, favored by the lax immigration laws then in force. Finnish Italians are Finns who speak Italian, were born in Italy or are children of Italian immigrants. The number of Italians can only be measured in the number of Italian speakers, people born in Italy and their children, since Finland doesn't collect statistics on ethnicity.

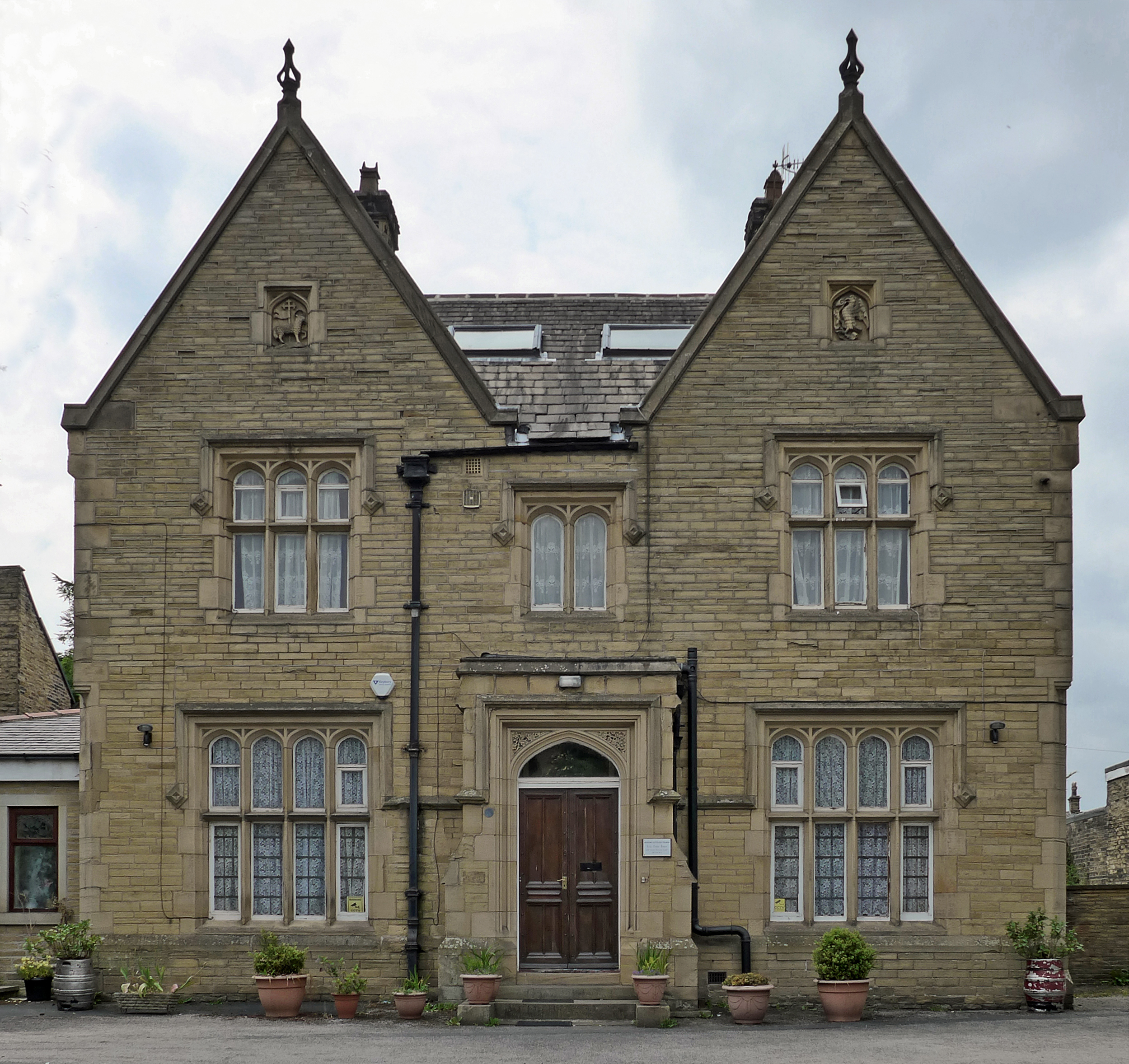
Italian Cultural Centre, City of Bradford, England

The English towns of Bedford and Hoddesdon have sizeable Italian populations. A significant number of Italians came to Bedford in the 1950s due to the London Brick Company finding itself short of workers in the wake of the post-war reconstruction boom. As a result, Bedford has the largest concentration of Italian families in the UK, and the third-highest number of Italian immigrants overall with around one-fifth of its overall population being of Italian descent. In Hoddesdon, many Italians, mostly descending from Sicily, migrated there and across the Lea Valley in the 1950s due to opportunities working in local garden nurseries. They were drawn to the area by the rich agricultural landscape and better pay in comparison to back home. Today, the town's Italian community has had such a significant impact that an Italian consul, Carmelo Nicastro, was even elected for the area. Also due to immigration in the 1800s there is a Little Italy in Clerkenwell, Islington, London.

=== Oceania ===
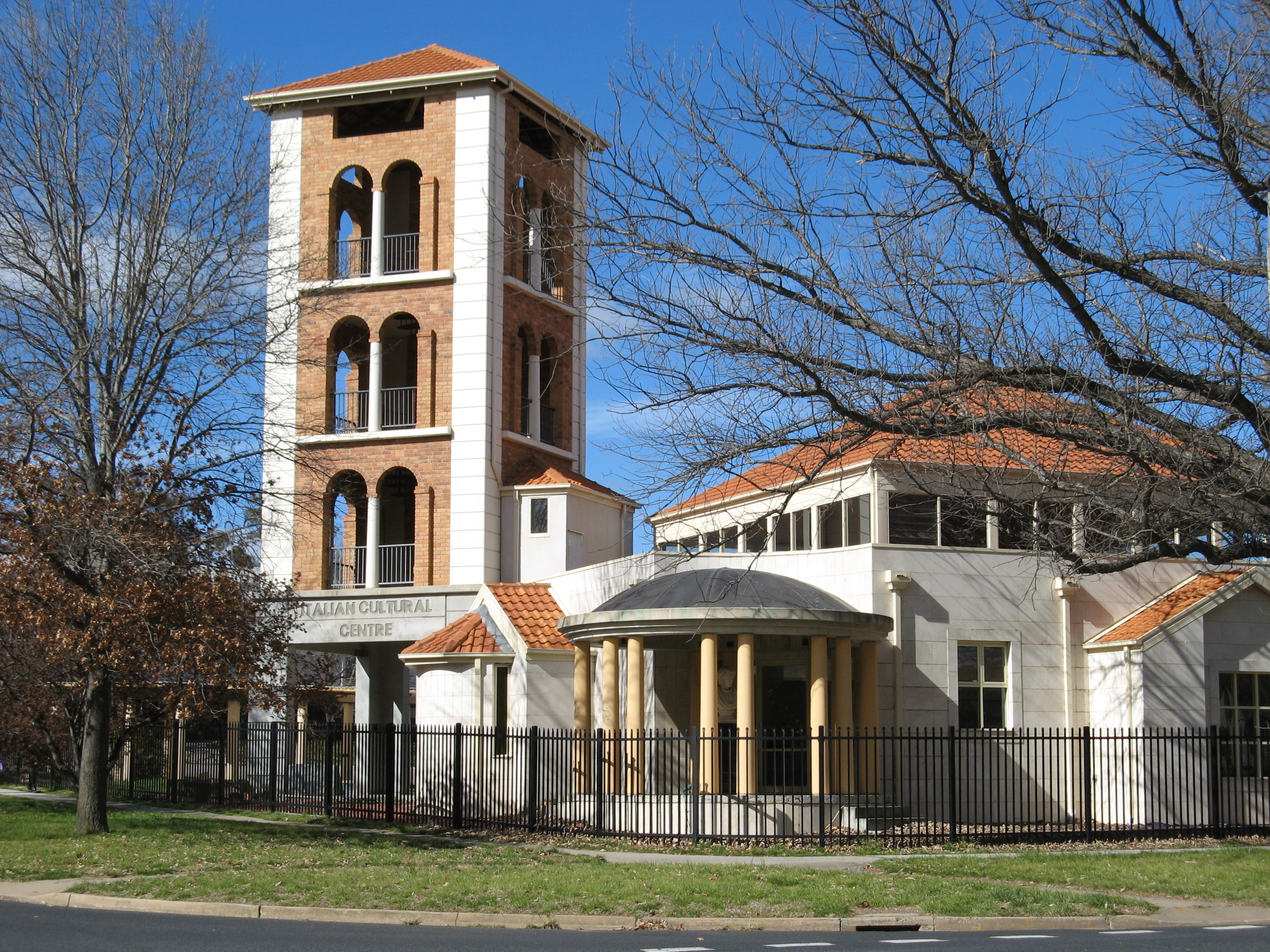
Italian Cultural Centre, Canberra, Australia

Italians first arrived in Australia in the decades immediately following the Unification of Italy, but the most significant wave was after World War II ended in 1945, particularly from 1950 to 1965. Italian Australians had a significant impact on Australia's culture, society and economy. At the 2021 census, 1,108,364 Australian residents nominated Italian ancestry (whether alone or in combination with another ancestry), representing 4.4% of the Australian population. The 2021 census found that 171,520 were born in Italy. As of 2021, there are 228,042 Australian residents who speak Italian or Italian dialects at home. The Italo-Australian dialect is prominent among Italian Australians who use the Italian language.

Unlike Australia, New Zealand did not receive much immigration from Italy. Several hundreds of them, mostly fishermen, immigrated in the late-1890s. The 2013 Census counted 3,795 New Zealanders of Italian descent.

== Statistics ==
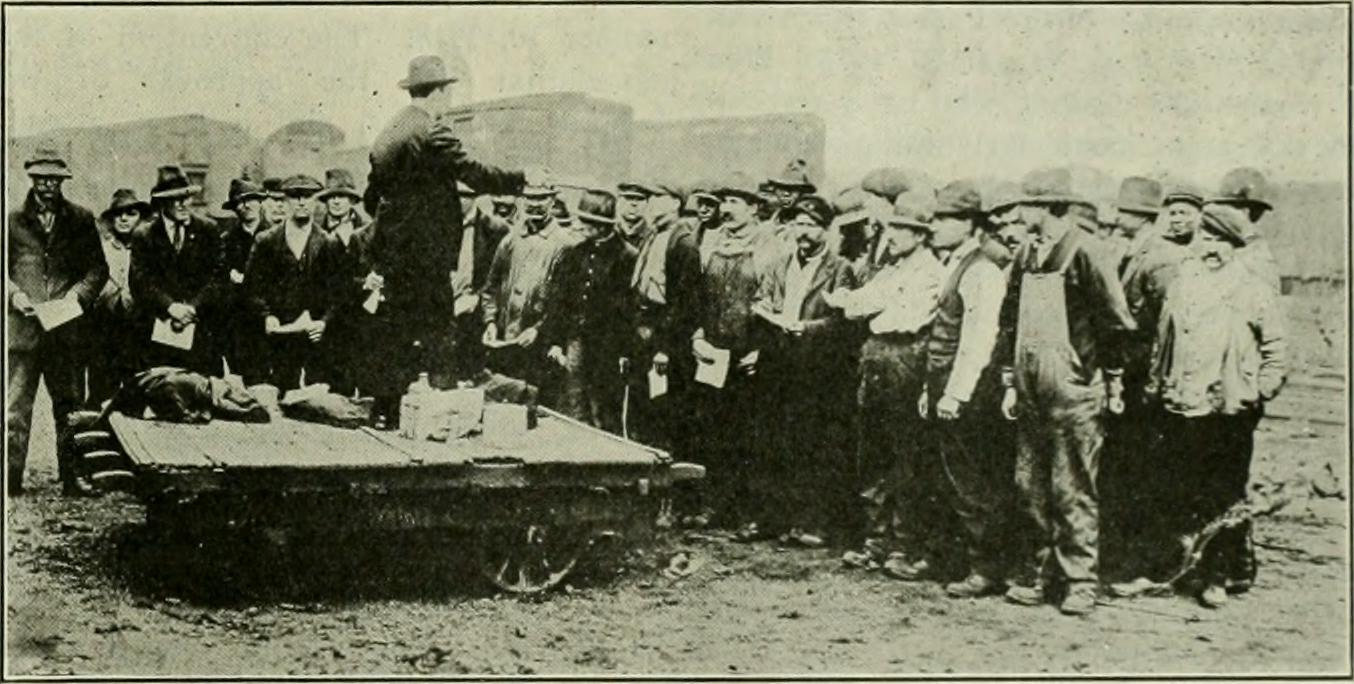
Italian emigrants employed in the construction of a railway in the United States (1918)

After 1890, Italian contribution to the emigration flow to the New World was significant. By 1870, Italy had about 25,000,000 inhabitants (compared to 40,000,000 in Germany and 30,000,000 in the United Kingdom).

A preliminary census done in 1861, after the annexation of the South, claimed that there were a mere 100,000 Italians living abroad. The General Directorate of Statistics did not start compiling official emigration statistics until 1876. Accurate figures on the decades between 1870 and World War I show how emigration increased dramatically during that period:

Italian emigrants per 1,000 population:

- 1870–1879: 4.29
- 1880–1889: 6.09
- 1890–1899: 8.65
- 1900–1913: 17.97

The high point of Italian emigration was in 1913, when 872,598 people left Italy.

By extrapolating from the 25,000,000 inhabitants of Italy at the time of unification, natural birth and death rates, without emigration, there would have been a population of about 65,000,000 by 1970. Instead, because of emigration earlier in the century, there were only 54,000,000.

Italian emigrants in the period following the unification of Italy until the 1970s, a period that saw the Italians as protagonists of the greatest exodus in modern history, were more than 29 million. The statistical history of this Italian emigration can be divided into four temporal phases (according to L. Favero):

The first, from 1876 (first official survey) to 1900, is due to socio-economic factors, at first it was directed mainly towards France and Germany, then towards South America and, to a lesser extent, North America. Through mainly spontaneous and clandestine movements, about 5.3 million people expatriated, especially from northern Italy. We are talking about a huge share of the population, which at that time fluctuated around 30 million inhabitants. In practice, over 15% of the population.

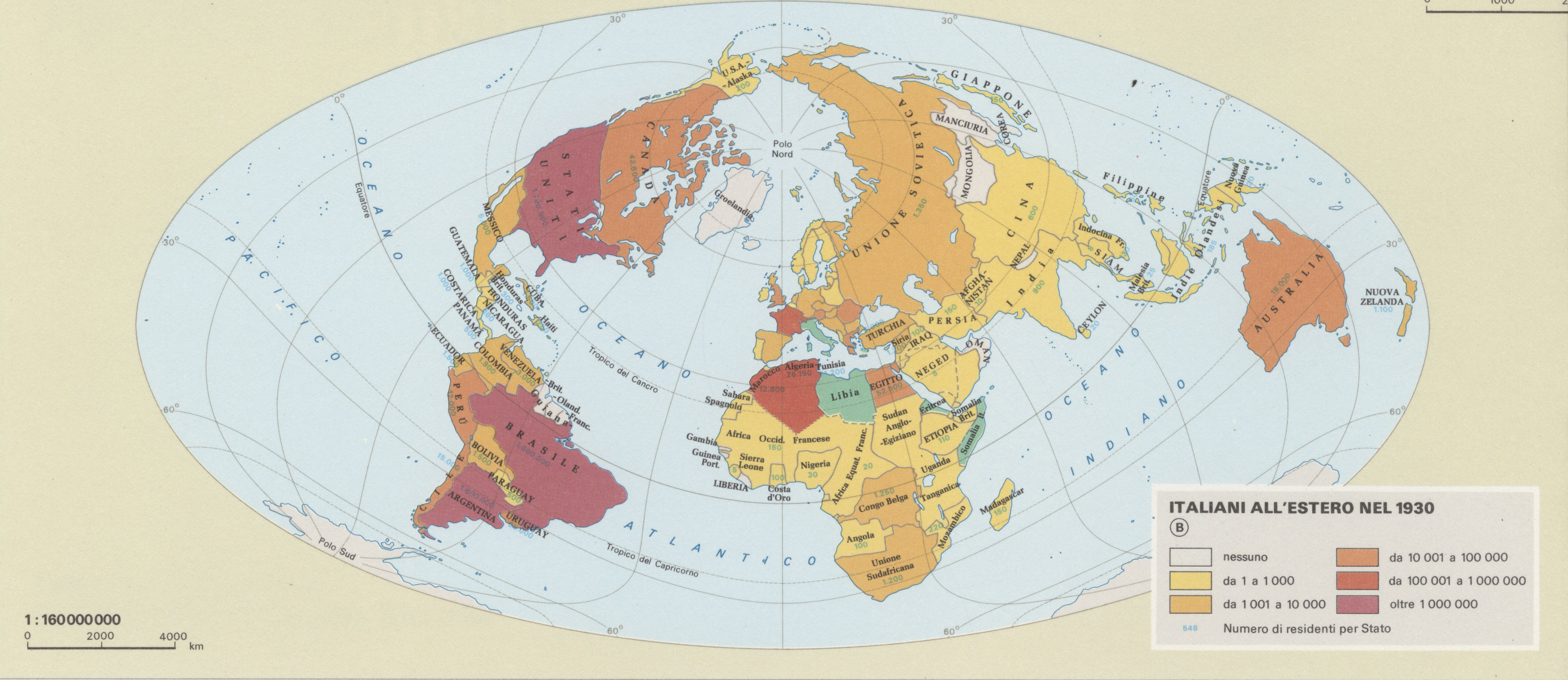
Italians abroad in 1930

The second was the great wave of Italian emigrants, that continued from 1900 to 1914. This second phase sees the protagonists above all emigrants from central-southern Italy, expelled from the agricultural sector and from rural areas without finding an alternative in a still shaky industrial sector. This phase, called the Great Emigration, was mainly extra-European, even if France and Germany remained privileged European destinations, to which Switzerland was added. The outbreak of the First World War and the consequent dangerousness of travel put an end to this phase, in which more than 9.5 million people left Italy, equal to a quarter of the total population.

The third was between the two world wars - and was a phase of decline in Italian emigration due to the legislative restrictions adopted by the landing states, the economic crisis of '29 and the restrictive and anti-emigration policy pursued by the fascism. In this period, the decrease in non-European immigration led to an increase in European flows, towards France (the favorite destination of the opponents of the regime) and Germany (after the signing of the Pact of Steel). The movements towards colonial Africa were added, an attempt at imperial expansionism (in Libya, Eritrea, Ethiopia and Somalia). More than 3.5 million Italians emigrated in those 20 years.

Finally, the fourth phase is that of the postwar period: from 1945 to 1970 - a period of profound economic, social and political changes - migratory flows returned to be particularly large, especially from the south of the country. The main transoceanic destinations were Brazil and Argentina and Australia, while in Europe they aimed in particular towards France, Germany, Belgium and Switzerland. The Italian emigrants were about 7.3 million.

The overall description of the phenomenon is as follows:

Number of Italian emigrants by decade and by country of destination
Years	United States Canada	France	Switzerland	Germany	Argentina	Brazil	Other countries
1861–1870	-	288,000	38,000	44,000	-	-	91,000
1871–1880	26,000	347,000	132,000	105,000	86,000	37,000	265,460
1881–1890	251,000	374,000	71,000	86,000	391,000	215,000	303,590
1891–1900	520,000	259,000	189,000	230,000	367,000	580,000	393,440
1901–1910	2,394,000	572,000	655,000	591,000	734,000	303,000	395,540
1911–1920	1,650,000	664,000	433,000	285,000	315,000	125,000	436,480
1921–1930	450,000	1,010,000	157,000	11,490	535,000	76,000	331,000
1931–1940	170,000	741,000	258,000	7,900	190,000	15,000	368,950
1946–1950	158,000	175,000	330,000	2,155	278,000	45,915	306,265
1951–1960	297,000	491,000	1,420,000	1,140,000	24,800	22,200	544,000
1961–1970	208,000	898,000	593,000	541,000	9,800	5,570	377,280
1971–1980	61,500	492,000	243,000	310,000	8,310	6,380	196,980
1981–1985	16,000	20,000	85,000	105,000	4,000	2,200	69,000
Emigrated	6,201,000	6,322,000	4,604,000	3,458,000	2,941,000	1,432,000	4,078,000
Came back to Italy	721,000	2,972,000	2,058,000	1,045,000	750,000	162,000	2,567,000
Remained abroad	5,480,000	3,350,000	2,546,000	2,413,000	2,191,000	1,270,000	1,511,000
Total emigrated: 29,000,000 · Total came back to Italy: 10,275,000 · Total remained abroad: 18,725,000

The 2016 Italian constitutional referendum provided data on the number of registered Italian citizens living outside Italy by country. The highest number is in Argentina, with 673,238 registered Italians residing in the country in 2016, followed by Germany with 581,433, Switzerland with 482,539, France with 329,202, Brazil with 325,555, the UK with 232,932, Belgium 225,801, the United States with 218,407, Canada with 122,262, Australia with 120,791, and Spain with 118,879.

== Italian language and its dialects ==
Italian language in the United States

Municipalities where Talian is co-official in Rio Grande do Sul, Brazil

Italian language is spoken by large immigrant and expatriate communities in the Americas and Australia. Although over 17 million Americans are of Italian descent, only a little over one million people in the United States speak Italian at home. Nevertheless, an Italian language media market does exist in the country. In Canada, Italian is the second most spoken non-official language when varieties of Chinese are not grouped together, with 375,645 claiming Italian as their mother tongue in 2016.

Italian immigrants to South America have also brought a presence of the language to that continent. According to some sources, Italian is the second most spoken language in Argentina after the official language of Spanish, although its number of speakers, mainly of the older generation, is decreasing. Italian bilingual speakers can be found scattered across the Southeast of Brazil as well as in the South, In Venezuela, Italian is the most spoken language after Spanish and Portuguese, with around 200,000 speakers. In Uruguay, people that speak Italian as their home language is 1.1% of the total population of the country. In Australia, Italian is the second most spoken foreign language after Chinese, with 1.4% of the population speaking it as their home language.

From the late 19th to the mid-20th century, millions of Italians settled in Argentina, Uruguay, Southern Brazil and Venezuela, as well as in Canada and the United States, where they formed a physical and cultural presence. In some cases, colonies were established where variants of regional languages of Italy were used, and some continue to use this regional language. Examples are Rio Grande do Sul, Brazil, where Talian is used, and the town of Chipilo near Puebla, Mexico; each continues to use a derived form of Venetian dating back to the nineteenth century. Other examples are Cocoliche, an Italian–Spanish pidgin once spoken in Argentina and especially in Buenos Aires, and Lunfardo. The Rioplatense Spanish dialect of Argentina and Uruguay today has thus been heavily influenced by both standard Italian and Italian regional languages as a result.

== Roots tourism ==
Italian diaspora has led to an important flow of tourists of Italian origin who visit Italy and discover their roots. The trip to Italy of these tourists is mainly about knowing the places, the language, the cuisine and the people to which their ancestors belonged. In 2018, about 10 million tourists of Italian origin went to the country to rediscover their roots.

== Descendants of Italian immigrants ==
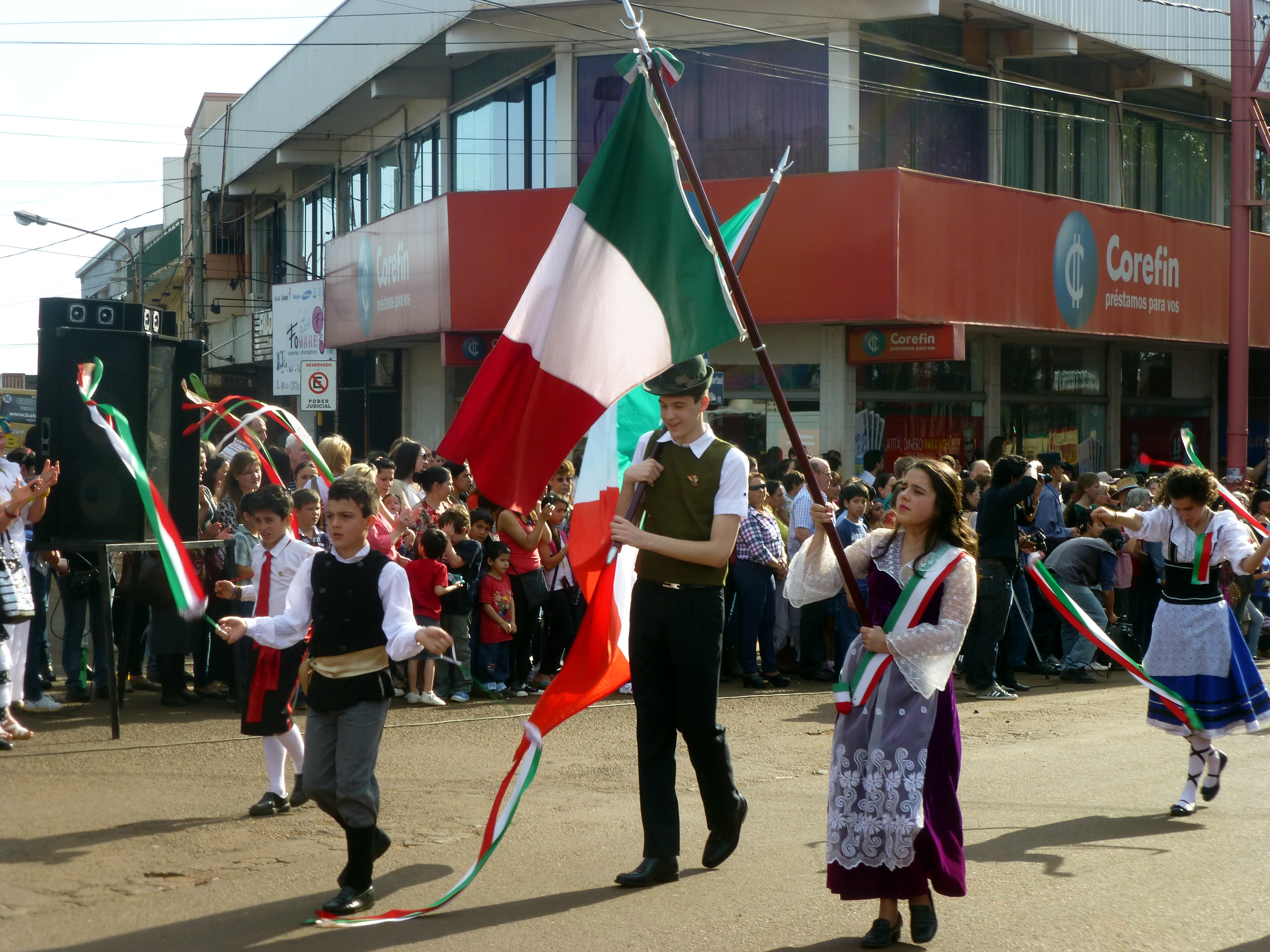
Italian Argentines wave the flag of Italy during the opening parade of the XXXIV Immigrant's Festival.

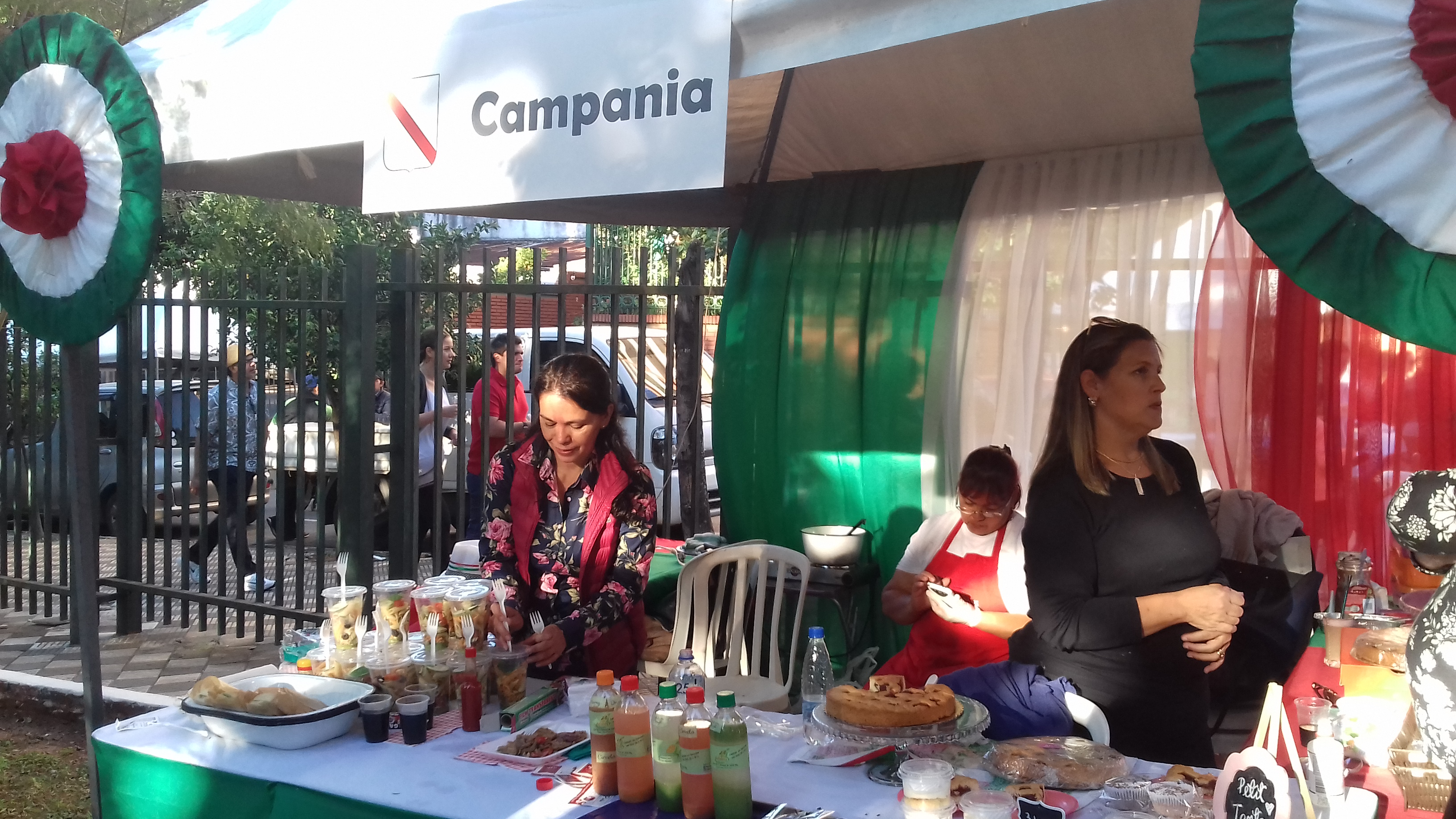
Italian Paraguayans originally from Campania during the 3rd edition of the Festa Italiana ("Italian Feast") in Asunción. Their stand is decorated with a flag of Italy and some cockades of Italy.

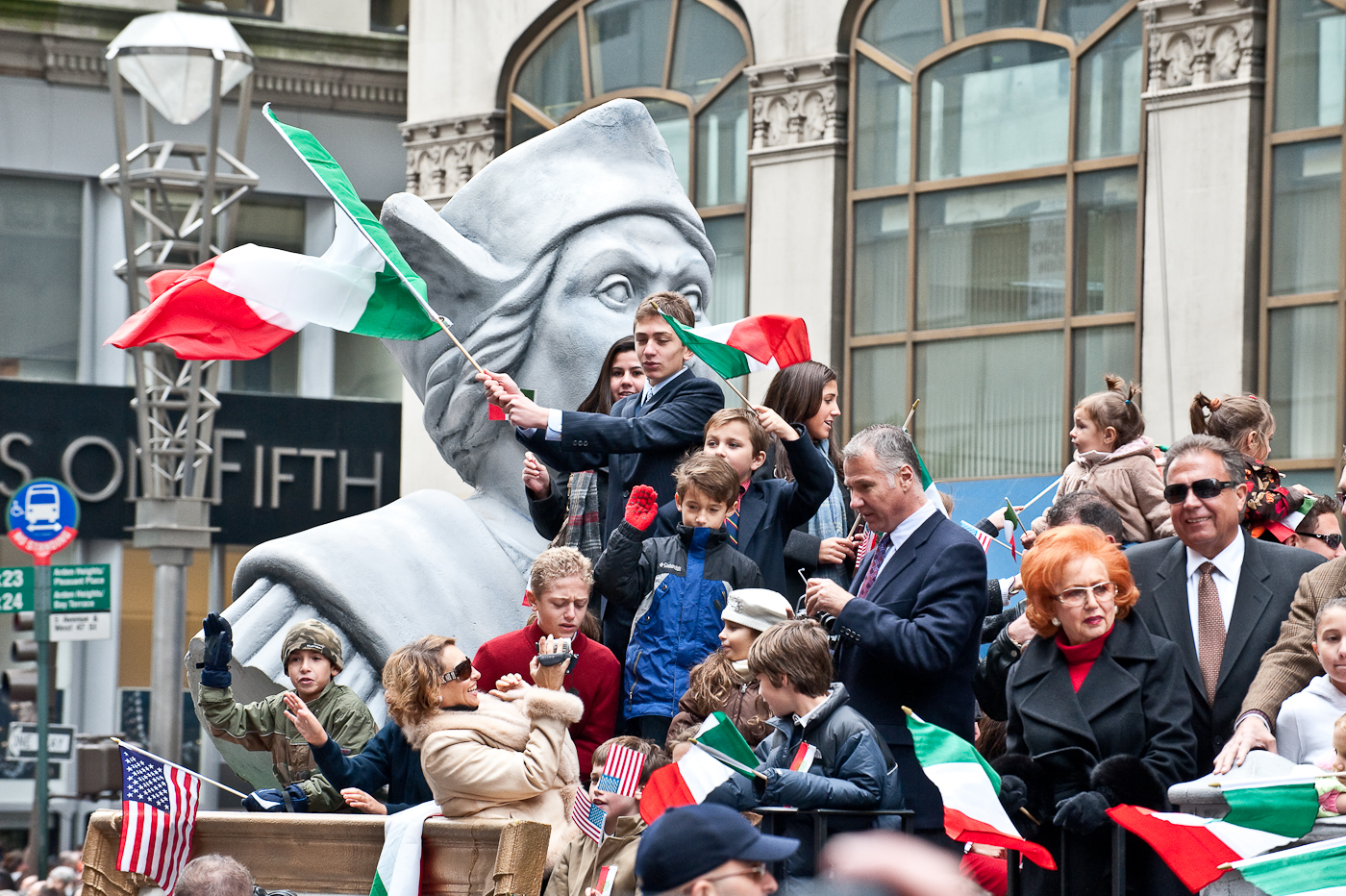
Columbus Day parade in New York City, 2009

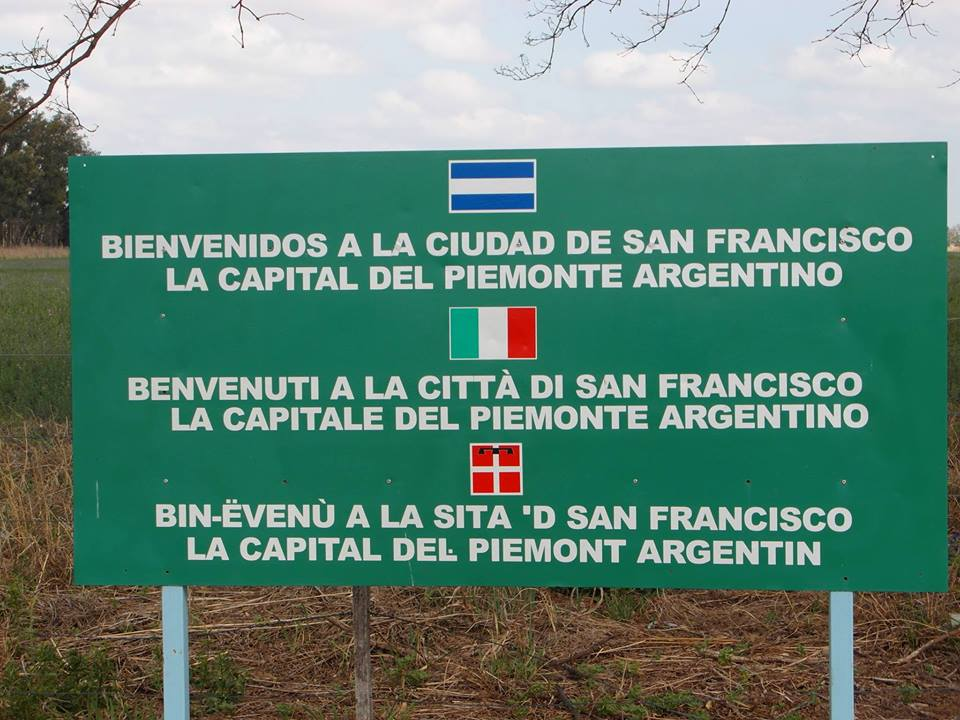
Trilingual sign in San Francisco, Argentina, in Spanish, Italian and Piedmontese.

In the 19th and 20th centuries, nearly 33 million Italians left Italy to the Americas, Australia and Western Europe as their main destinations.

It is estimated that the number of their descendants, who are called "oriundi", is more than 80 million worldwide. They are widespread in different countries around the world with the most numerous communities in Brazil, Argentina, Uruguay and the United States.

Considering that a oriundo can have even only a distant ancestor born in Italy, the majority of oriundi have only an Italian surname (and often not even that) but not Italian citizenship. In some countries, especially in South America, the estimates are very approximate since there is no type of census on one's origins (as is the case in the United States or Canada).

Italian oriundi constitute a population of very conspicuous proportions. Only in Argentina, according to an estimate, there are tens of millions of Italian oriundi and no less nourished are the communities in the United States of America and Brazil, other main destinations of the aforementioned migratory flow at the turn of the 20th century. In many other European countries the Italian communities are widely distributed, but at least in the Schengen area the fall of many nationalistic barriers that made the problem of relations with the Motherland much less stringent. The concepts of multi-ethnicity and naturalization in football have affected the whole world, so much so that at the 2014 FIFA World Cup—in the squads of the 32 participating national teams—there were 83 oriundi.

In Italy, a nation in which the phenomenon of emigration abroad (especially between the 19th and 20th centuries) has developed in huge proportions, the recovery of the relationship with the communities of Italian origin formed in the world is enjoying growing attention. Regulations are beginning to be enacted, particularly in regional areas, which no longer provide assistance and not only for those who were born in Italy and who expatriated, but also for their descendants (precisely the oriundi), so that the cultural identity bond can be consolidated. An example of this is the law of the Veneto region n°2 9 January 2003, in which various actions are arranged in favor of the emigrant, the surviving spouse and descendants up to the third generation, in order to "guarantee the maintenance of the Venetian identity and improve the knowledge of the culture of origin".

The term oriundo is widely used to indicate an athlete, especially a football, rugby, futsal, ice hockey, roller hockey and basketball player of Italian origin, equated in sports legislation to the citizens of Italian peninsula and therefore admitted to be part of the Italian national team; this is the case of the footballers Anfilogino Guarisi, Atilio Demaría, Luis Monti, Enrique Guaita and Raimundo Orsi world champions with the national team in 1934, Michele Andreolo world champion in 1938, Mauro Camoranesi, world champion in 2006, Jorginho and Emerson Palmieri, European champions in 2020 and of several other footballers from the 1930s to today.

One of the events most felt by Italian oriundi in the United States is Columbus Day, an event celebrated in many countries to commemorate the day of the arrival of Christopher Columbus (Italian: Cristoforo Colombo [kriˈstɔːforo koˈlombo]), an Italian explorer and navigator born in Genoa, to the New World on 12 October 1492. Columbus Day was first commemorated by Italians in San Francisco in 1869, followed by the many Italian-related celebrations held in New York City.

Main communities of descendants of Italian immigrants in the world
Country	Population	Community	Notes
Brazil	32,000,000 (about 15% of the total population)	Italian Brazilians	
Argentina	25,000,000 (about 62% of the total population)	Italian Argentines	
United States	18,000,000 (about 5.4% of the total population)	Italian Americans	
France	5,500,000 (about 8% of the total population)	Italian French	
Paraguay	2,500,000 (about 37% of the total population)	Italian Paraguayans	
Colombia	2,000,000 (about 4% of the total population)	Italian Colombians	
Peru	2,000,000 (about 6% of the total population)	Italian Peruvians	
Venezuela	1,500,000 – 2,000,000 (about 5% of the total population)	Italian Venezuelans	
Uruguay	1,500,000 (about 44% of the total population)	Italian Uruguayans	
Canada	1,500,000 (about 4% of the total population)	Italian Canadians	
Germany	1,200,000 (about 1.4% of the total population)	Italian Germans	
Australia	1,000,000 (about 4% of the total population)	Italian Australians	
Mexico	850,000 (<1% of the total population)	Italian Mexicans	
Chile	600,000 (about 3.5% of the total population)	Italian Chileans	
Switzerland	530,000 (about 7% of the total population)	Italian Swiss	
United Kingdom	500,000 (<1% of the total population)	Italian British	
Belgium	450,000 (about 4% of the total population)	Italian Belgians	
Costa Rica	380,000 (about 7.5% of the total population)	Italian Costa Ricans	
Dominican Republic	300,000 (about 3% of the total population)	Italian Dominicans	
Spain	260,000 (<1% of the total population)	Italian Spaniards	
El Salvador	200,000 (about 3% of the total population)	Italian Salvadorans	

== Little Italy ==
World map of first level subdivisions (states, counties, provinces, etc.) that are home to Little Italys or Italian neighbourhoods

Little Italy is a general name for an ethnic enclave populated primarily by Italians or people of Italian ancestry, usually in an urban neighborhood. The concept of "Little Italy" holds many different aspects of the Italian culture. There are shops selling Italian goods as well as Italian restaurants lining the streets.

A "Little Italy" strives essentially to have a version of the country of Italy placed in the middle of a large non-Italian city. This sort of enclave is often the result of periods of immigration in the past, during which people of the same culture settled together in certain areas. As cities modernized and grew, these areas became known for their ethnic associations, and ethnic neighborhoods like "Little Italy" blossomed, becoming the icons they are today.

== National Museum of the Italian Emigration ==
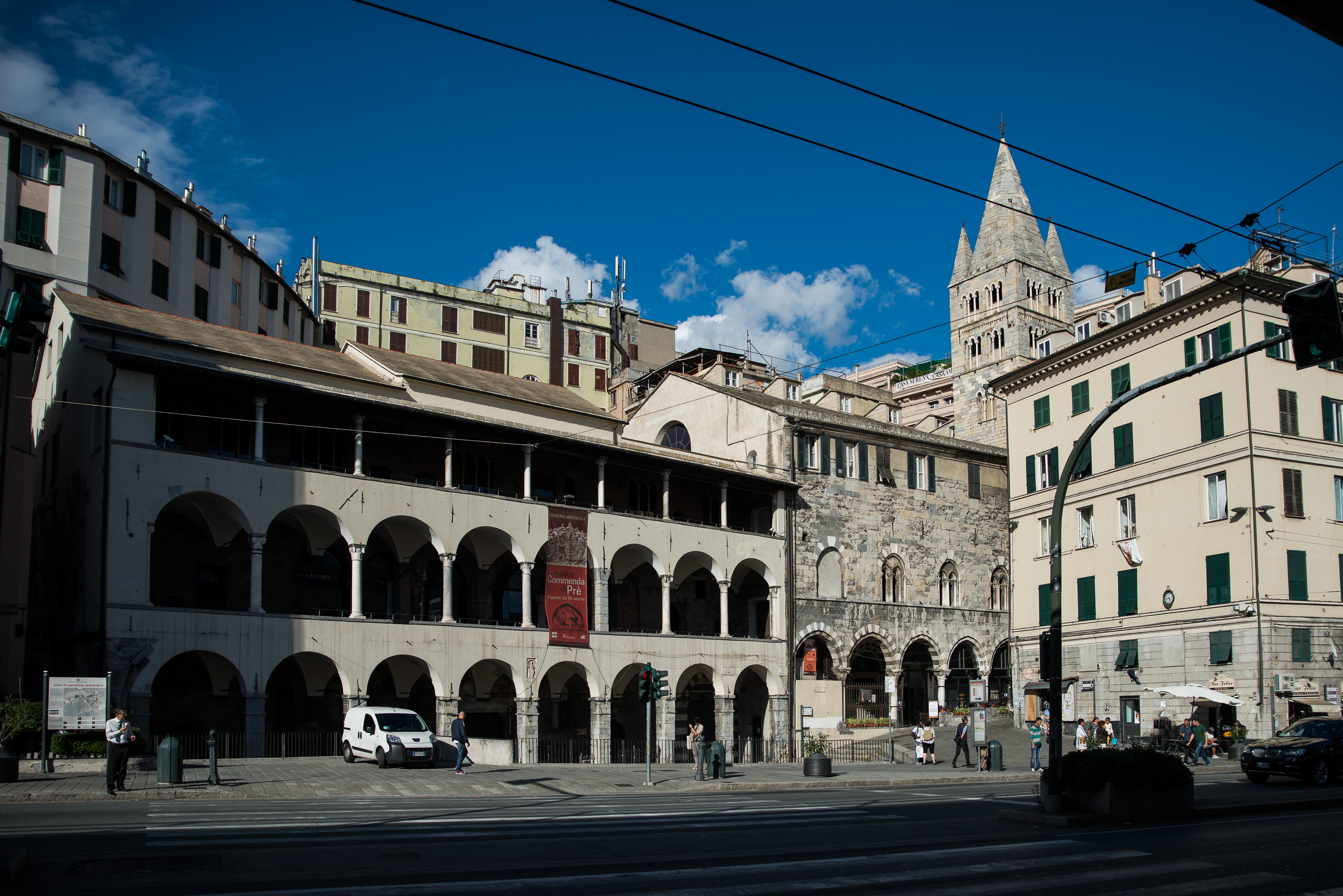
The Commenda di San Giovanni di Prè in Genoa, Italy, which houses the National Museum of the Italian Emigration

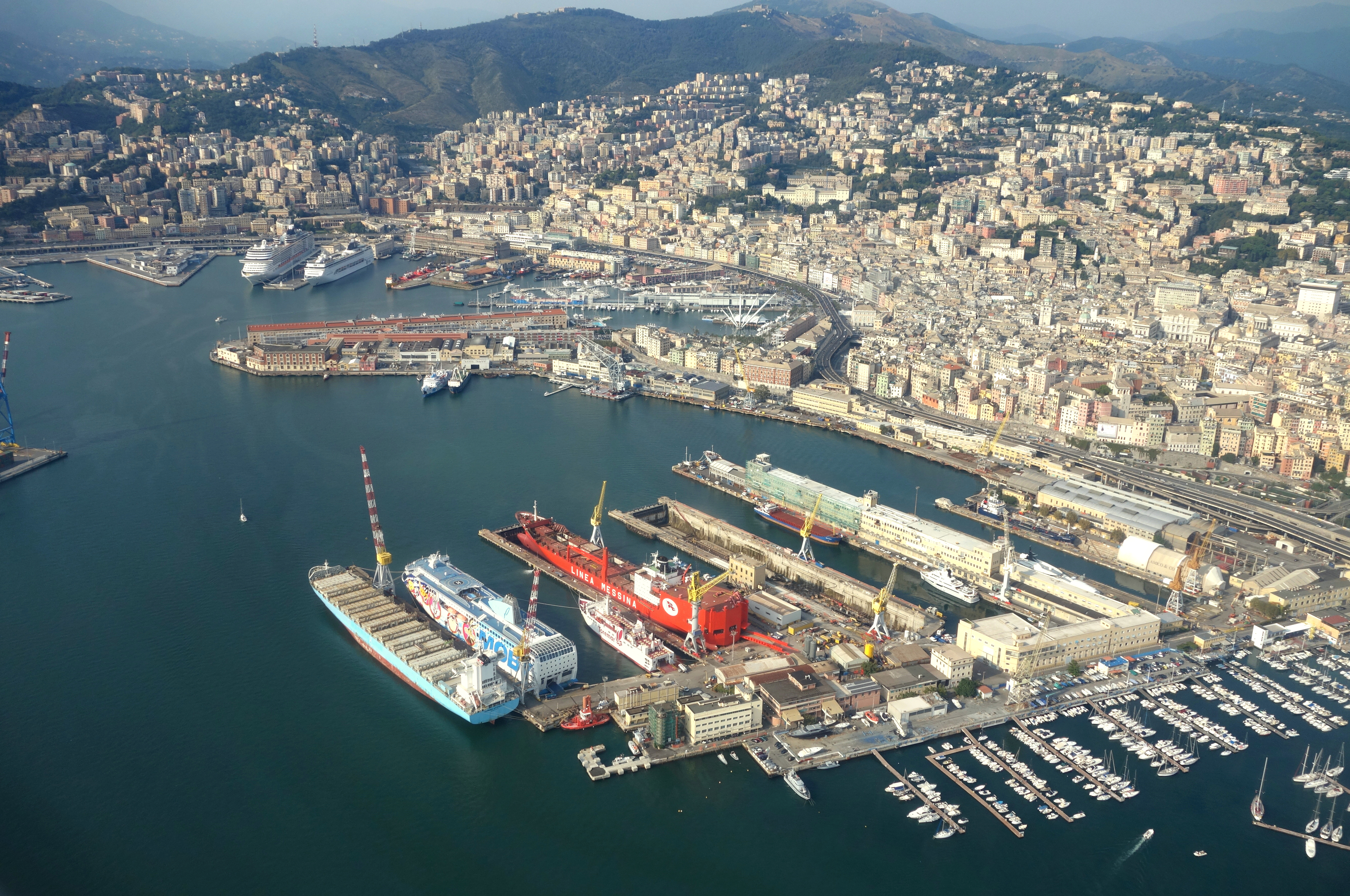
The Port of Genoa, from which millions of Italian emigrants left for the Americas, Africa, Asia and Australia

The Commenda di San Giovanni di Prè in Genoa, Italy, houses the National Museum of the Italian Emigration (Italian: Museo Nazionale dell'Emigrazione Italiana, "MEI"). The exhibition space, which is spread over three floors and 16 thematic areas, describes the phenomenon of Italian emigration from before the unification of Italy to the present. The National Museum of the Italian Emigration is part of the museum circuit of the Istituzione Musei del Mare e delle Migrazioni (Mu.MA, "Institution of Sea and Migration Museums"), established in 2005, which also includes the Galata - Museo del mare, the naval museum of Pegli and the monumental complex of the Lighthouse of Genoa.

The choice of Genoa as the site of the museum was not accidental as millions of Italians from all over Italy departed by ship from its port to the Americas, Africa, Asia and Australia. The museum describes the stories through autobiographies, diaries, letters, photographs and newspaper articles of the time that dealt with the theme of Italian emigration. More precisely, the 16 areas that make up the museum describe Italian emigration both chronologically and from a thematic point of view. Each of the 16 areas is equipped with archive stations, interactive multimedia stations and video projections.

The National Museum of the Italian Emigration was officially established by the Italian Ministry of Foreign Affairs on 3 December 2008, with its temporary headquarters in the internal spaces of the Altare della Patria in Rome. The collection and cataloging of the material to be exhibited in the museum was carried out by the Ministry of Foreign Affairs, the Italian Ministry of Culture and numerous Italian research bodies. The museum was inaugurated at the Altare della Patria in 2009 and then temporarily closed in 2016, when procedures were started to find the definitive location of the museum, a choice that fell, in 2018, on the Commenda di San Giovanni di Prè in Genoa. The inauguration of the definitive location of the museum in Genoa took place in May 2022.

== Filmography ==
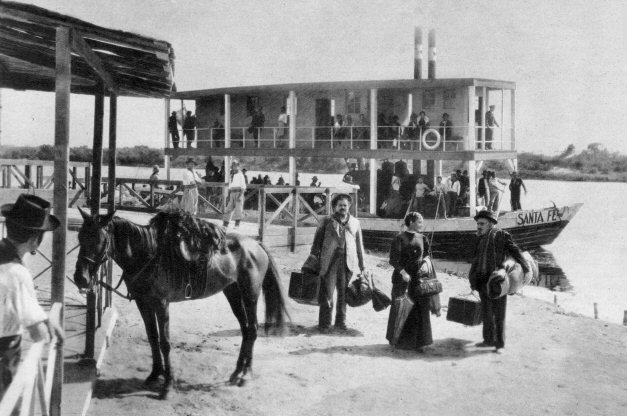
A scene from the film Red Passport (1935)

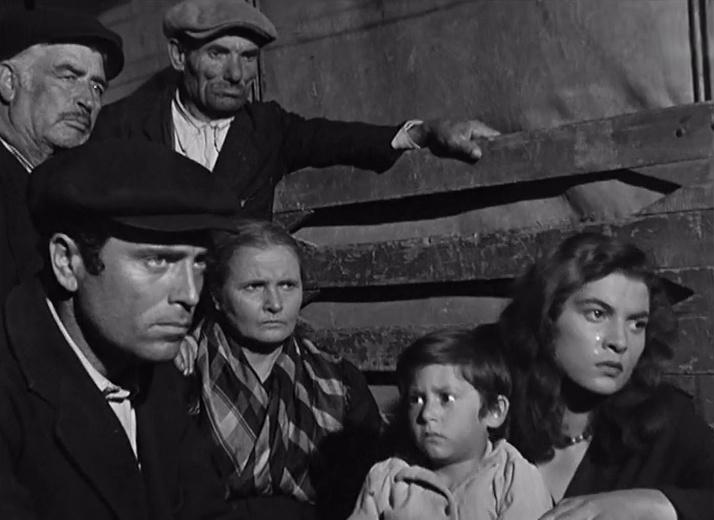
A scene from the film Path of Hope (1950)

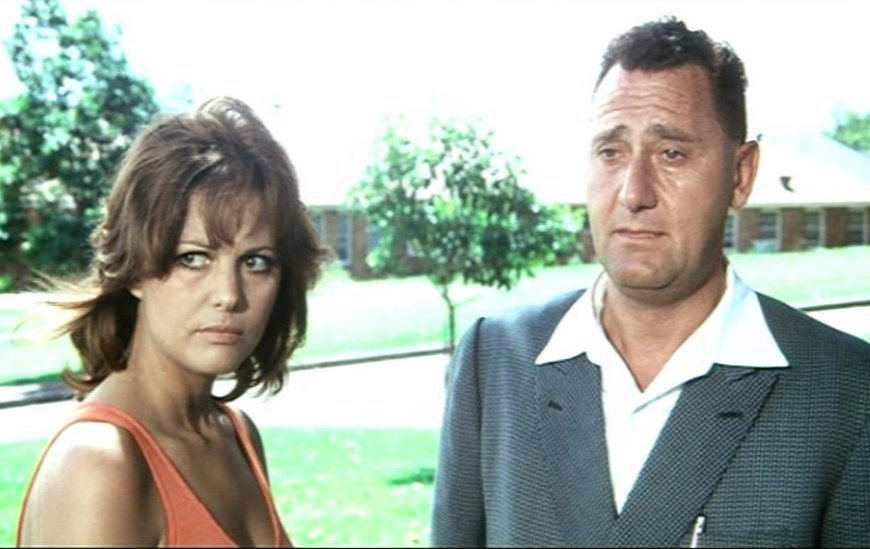
A scene from the film A Girl in Australia (1971)

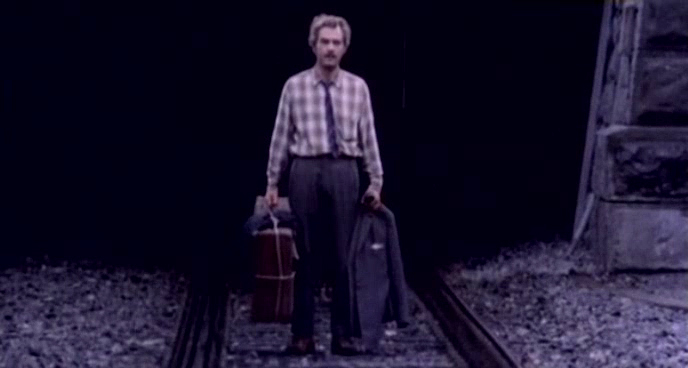
A scene from the film Bread and Chocolate (1974)

- Red Passport (1935), directed by Guido Brignone and starring Isa Miranda, Filippo Scelzo and Ugo Ceseri.
- Immigrants (1948), directed by Aldo Fabrizi and starring Aldo Fabrizi, Ave Ninchi and Nando Bruno.
- Path of Hope (1950), directed by Pietro Germi and starring Raf Vallone, Elena Varzi, Saro Urzì and Renato Terra.
- Neapolitans in Milan (1953), directed by Eduardo De Filippo and starring Eduardo De Filippo, Anna Maria Ferrero and Frank Latimore.
- The Magliari (1959), directed by Francesco Rosi and starring Alberto Sordi, Belinda Lee and Renato Salvatori.
- Rocco and His Brothers (1960), directed by Luchino Visconti and starring Alain Delon, Renato Salvatori, Annie Girardot and Claudia Cardinale
- Il Gaucho (1964), directed by Dino Risi and starring Vittorio Gassman, Amedeo Nazzari, Jorgelina Aranda and Umberto D'Orsi.
- A Girl in Australia (1971), directed by Luigi Zampa and starring Alberto Sordi, Claudia Cardinale, Riccardo Garrone and Corrado Olmi.
- Sacco & Vanzetti (1971), directed by Giuliano Montaldo and starring Gian Maria Volonté, Riccardo Cucciolla and Cyril Cusack
- The Godfather (1972), directed by Francis Ford Coppola and starring Marlon Brando, Al Pacino, James Caan, Richard Castellano, Robert Duvall, Sterling Hayden, John Marley, Richard Conte and Diane Keaton.
- The Godfather Part II (1974), directed by Francis Ford Coppola and starring Al Pacino, Robert Duvall, Diane Keaton, Robert De Niro, Talia Shire, Morgana King, John Cazale, Mariana Hill, and Lee Strasberg.
- Bread and Chocolate (1974), directed by Franco Brusati and starring Nino Manfredi, Johnny Dorelli and Anna Karina.
- The Swissmakers (1978), directed by Rolf Lyssy and starring Emil Steinberger, Walo Lüönd and Hilde Ziegler.
- China Girl (1987), directed by Abel Ferrara and starring James Russo, Russell Wong and David Caruso.
- Do the Right Thing (1989), directed by Spike Lee and starring Spike Lee, Danny Aiello, Ossie Davis, Ruby Dee, Richard Edson, Giancarlo Esposito and John Turturro.
- O Quatrilho (1995), directed by Fábio Barreto and starring Patrícia Pillar, Glória Pires and Bruno Campos.
- The Barber of Rio (1996), directed by Giovanni Veronesi and starring Diego Abatantuono, Rocco Papaleo and Margaret Mazzantini.
- Big Night (1996), co-directed by Campbell Scott and Stanley Tucci, and starring Tony Shalhoub, Minnie Driver, Ian Holm, Isabella Rossellini and Allison Janney.
- Looking for Alibrandi (2000), directed by Kate Woods and starring Pia Miranda, Kick Gurry, Anthony LaPaglia, Greta Scacchi and Elena Cotta.
- Azzurro (2000), directed by Denis Rabaglia and starring Paolo Villaggio, Marie-Christine Barrault and Jean-Luc Bideau.
- Love's Brother (2004), directed by Jan Sardi and starring Giovanni Ribisi, Adam Garcia, Joe Petruzzi and Amelia Warner.
- Golden Door (2006), directed by Emanuele Crialese and starring Charlotte Gainsbourg, Vincenzo Amato, Francesco Casisa and Vincent Schiavelli.
- A Quiet Life (2010), directed by Claudio Cupellini and starring Toni Servillo, Marco D'Amore, Juliane Köhler, Maurizio Donadoni and Alice Dwyer.

== See also ==
- Internal migration in Italy

== Bibliography ==
- Favero, Luigi; Tassello, Graziano (1978). Cent'anni di emigrazione italiana (1876–1976). Rome: Cser.
- Sori, Ercole (1979). L'emigrazione italiana dall'Unità alla seconda guerra mondiale. Bologna: Il Mulino.
- Moretti, Enrico (1999). "Social Networks and Migrations: Italy 1876-1913". The International Migration Review. 33 (3): 640–657. doi:10.2307/2547529. JSTOR 2547529.
- Tomasi, Silvano M.; Dore, Grazia (1965). "La Democrazia Italiana e l'Emigrazione In America". International Migration Digest. 2 (2): 221. doi:10.2307/3002874. JSTOR 3002874.
- Delmedico, Sara; Di Franco, Manuela (2019-2020). "Fascism and ‘Italians abroad’: National Identity and the Building of the Fascist State". Chronica Mundi, 14: 81-119
