= Italians in the United States before 1880 =

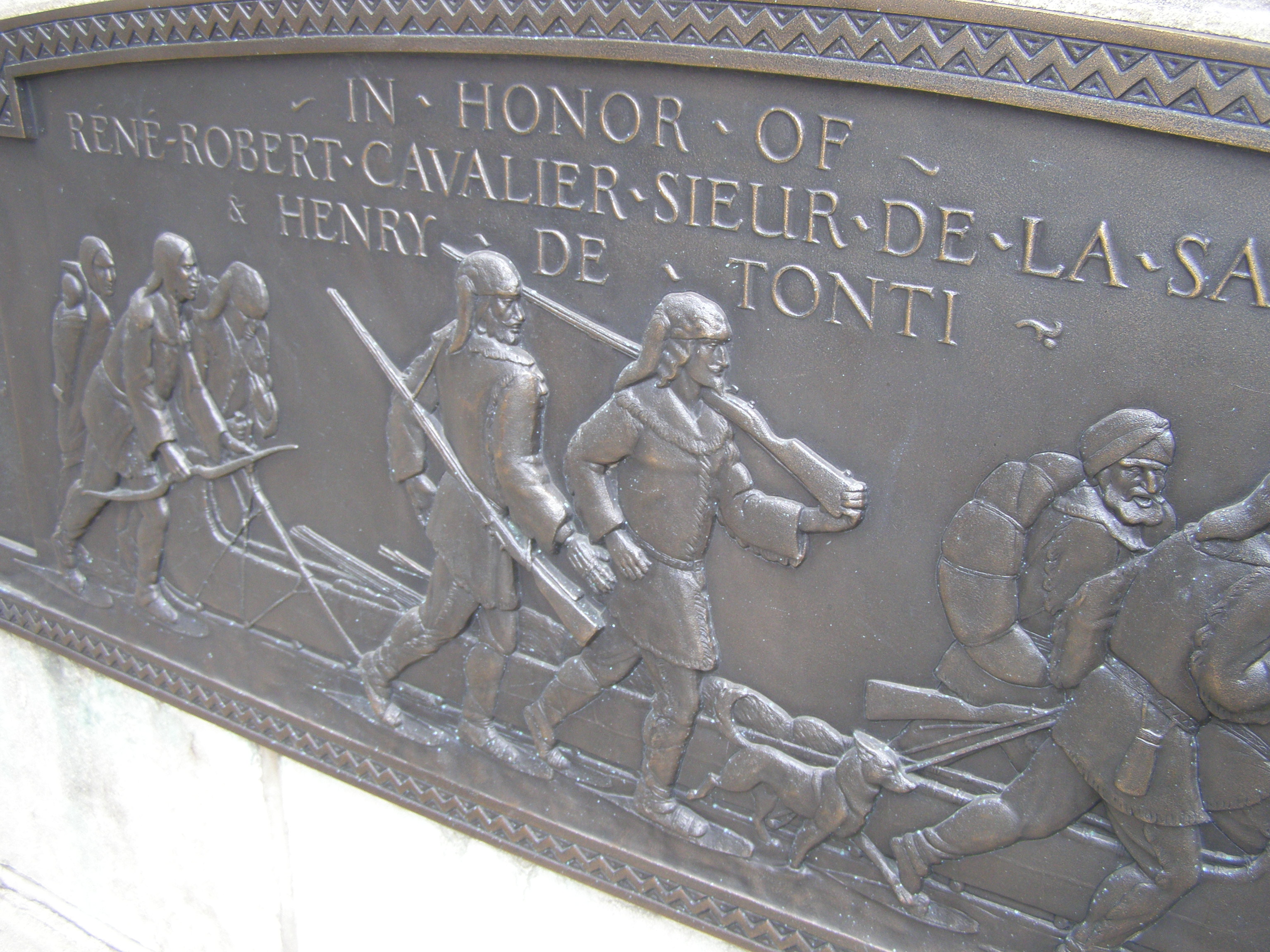
Bronze dedication on a southwest tower of the DuSable Bridge, Chicago, Ill. "In honor of René-Robert Cavelier, Sieur de La Salle & Enrico Tonti." Enrico Tonti founded the first European settlement in Illinois in 1679, and in Arkansas in 1683, making him "The Father of Arkansas". He co-founded New Orleans

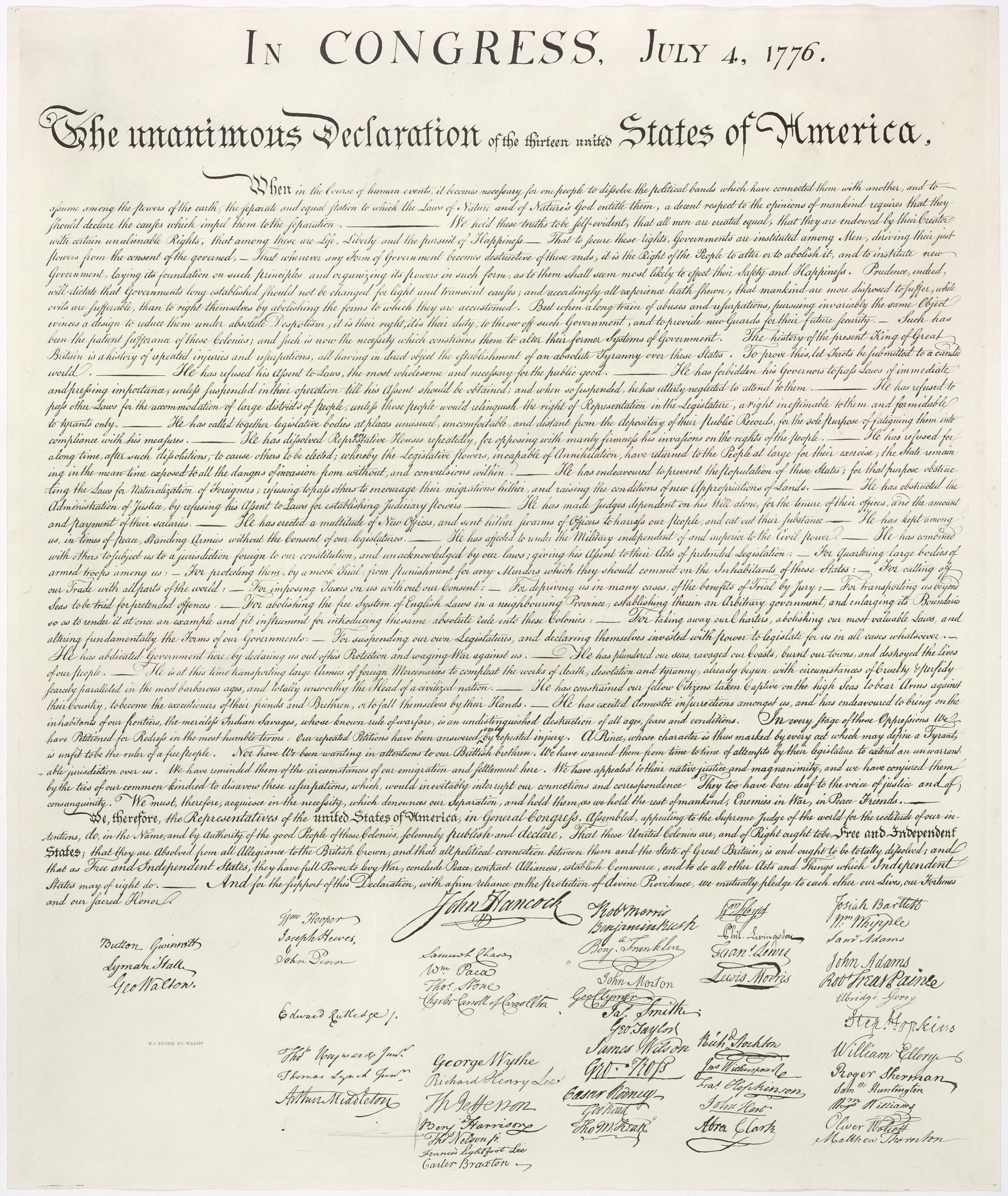
The United States Declaration of Independence. In 1773–1785, Filippo Mazzei, a physician, philosopher, diplomat and author, published a pamphlet containing the phrase "All men are by nature equally free and independent", which may have inspired Thomas Jefferson in drafting the Declaration of Independence.

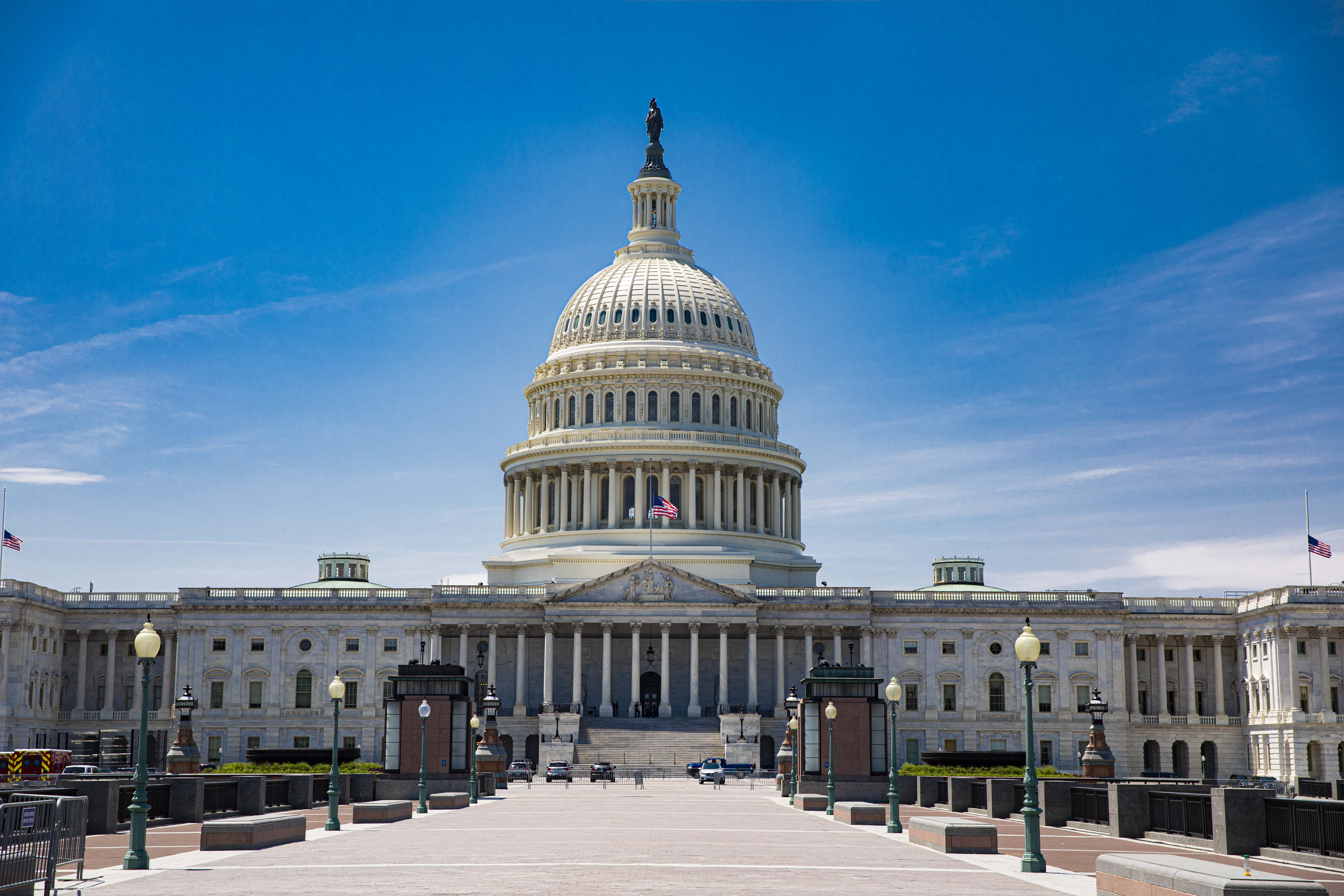
The United States Capitol in Washington. In 1866 Constantino Brumidi completed the frescoed interior of the United States Capitol dome, and spent the rest of his life executing still other artworks to beautify the Capitol.

Italians in America before 1880 included a number of explorers, starting with Christopher Columbus who landed in Puerto Rico on November 19, 1493. There also were a few small settlements. The first Italian to be registered as residing in the area corresponding to the current U.S. was Pietro Cesare Alberti, commonly regarded as the first Italian American, a Venetian seaman who, in 1635, settled in the Dutch colony of New Amsterdam, what would eventually become New York City. Enrico Tonti, together with the French explorer René-Robert Cavelier, Sieur de La Salle, explored the Great Lakes region. Tonti founded the first European settlement in Illinois in 1679 and in Arkansas in 1683, known as Poste de Arkansea, making him "The Father of Arkansas". With LaSalle, he co-founded New Orleans, and was governor of the Louisiana Territory for the next 20 years. His brother Alfonso Tonti, with French explorer Antoine de la Mothe Cadillac, was the co-founder of Detroit in 1701, and was its acting colonial governor for 12 years. The Taliaferro family (originally Tagliaferro), believed to have roots in Venice, was one of the First Families to settle Virginia.

In 1773–1785, Filippo Mazzei, a physician and close friend and confidant of Thomas Jefferson, published a pamphlet containing the phrase, "All men are by nature equally free and independent. Such equality is necessary in order to create a free government. All men must be equal to each other in natural law". As claimed by John F. Kennedy in A Nation of Immigrants and by Joint Resolution 175 of the 103rd Congress, Mazzei's phrase may have inspired Jefferson in drafting the Declaration of Independence. Italian Americans served in the American Revolutionary War both as soldiers and officers. Francesco Vigo aided the colonial forces of George Rogers Clark by serving as one of the foremost financiers of the Revolution in the frontier Northwest. Later, he was a co-founder of Vincennes University in Indiana. Between 5,000 and 10,000 Italian Americans fought in the American Civil War. The Garibaldi Guard recruited volunteers for the Union Army from Italy and other European countries to form the 39th New York Infantry. At the outbreak of the American Civil War, Giuseppe Garibaldi was a very popular figure. The great majority of Italian Americans, for both demographic and ideological reasons, served in the Union Army (including generals Edward Ferrero and Francis B. Spinola). Some Americans of Italian descent from the Southern states fought in the Confederate Army, such as General William B. Taliaferro (of English-American and Anglo-Italian descent) and P. G. T. Beauregard.

Giovanni Martino or Giovanni Martini, also known as John Martin, was a soldier and trumpeter who served both in Italy with Giuseppe Garibaldi and in the United States Army, famously in the 7th Cavalry Regiment under George Armstrong Custer, where he became known as the only survivor from Custer's company at the Battle of the Little Bighorn. An immigrant, Antonio Meucci, brought with him a concept for the telephone. He is credited by many researchers with being the first to demonstrate the principle of the telephone in a patent caveat he submitted to the U.S. Patent Office in 1871; however, considerable controversy existed relative to the priority of invention, with Alexander Graham Bell also being accorded this distinction. (In 2002, the U.S. House of Representatives passed a resolution on Meucci (H.R. 269) declaring that "his work in the invention of the telephone should be acknowledged.").

== Age of Discovery ==
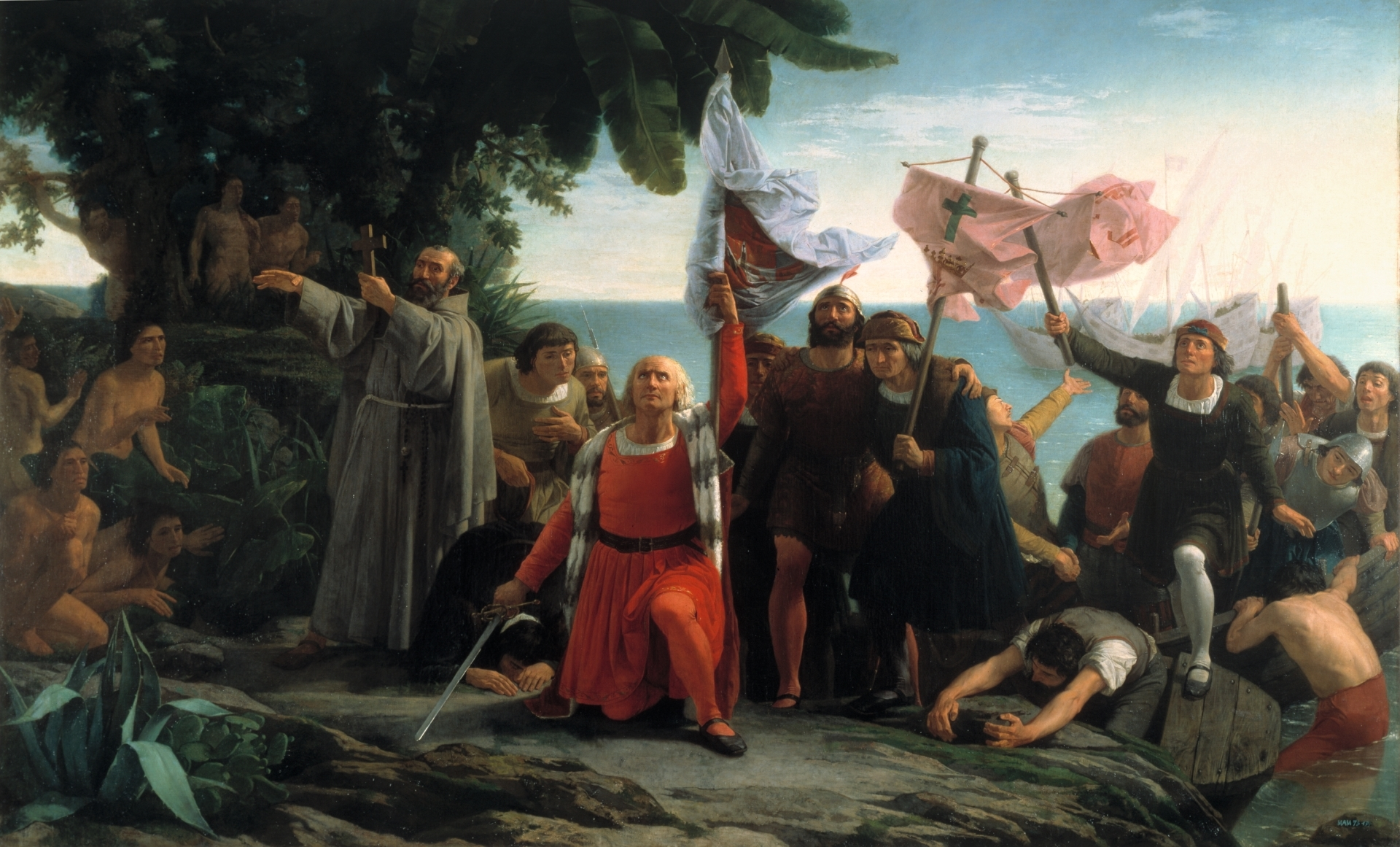
The Italian explorer Christopher Columbus leads an expedition to the New World, 1492. His voyages are celebrated as the discovery of the Americas from a European perspective, and they opened a new era in the history of humankind and sustained contact between the two worlds.

Italian navigators and explorers played a key role in the exploration and settlement of the Americas by Europeans. Genoese explorer Christopher Columbus (Italian: Cristoforo Colombo [kriˈstɔːforo koˈlombo]) completed four voyages across the Atlantic Ocean for the Catholic Monarchs of Spain. These voyages led to the widespread knowledge of the New World. This breakthrough inaugurated the period known as the Age of Discovery, which saw the colonization of the Americas, a related biological exchange, and trans-Atlantic trade. These events, the effects and consequences of which persist to the present, are often cited as the beginning of the modern era.

Born in the Republic of Genoa, Columbus was a navigator who sailed in search of a westward route to India, China, Japan and the Spice Islands thought to be the East Asian source of spices and other precious oriental goods obtainable only through arduous overland routes. Columbus was partly inspired by 13th-century Italian explorer Marco Polo in his ambition to explore Asia. His initial belief that he had reached "the Indies" has resulted in the name "West Indies" being attached to the Bahamas and the islands of the Caribbean. At the time of Columbus's voyages, the Americas were inhabited by Indigenous Americans, and Columbus later participated in the beginning of the Spanish conquest of the Americas.

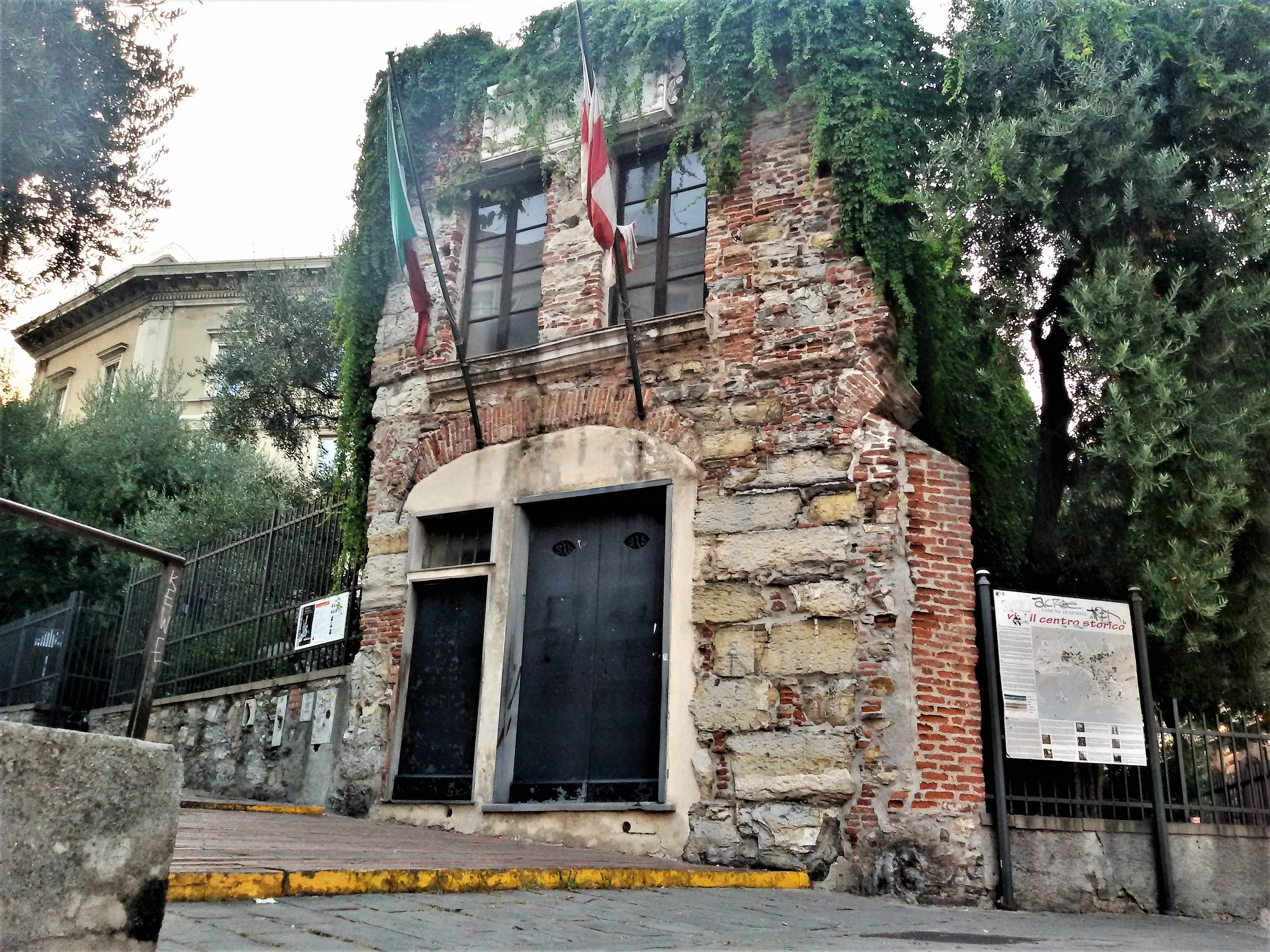
Christopher Columbus House in Genoa, Italy, an 18th-century reconstruction of the house in which Columbus grew up. The original was likely destroyed during the 1684 bombardment of Genoa.

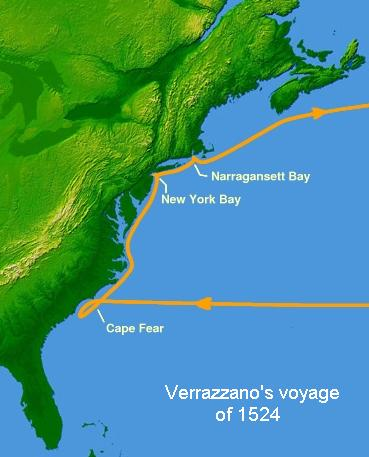
Giovanni da Verrazzano's voyage of 1524. The Italian explorer was the first documented European to enter New York Harbor and the Hudson River.

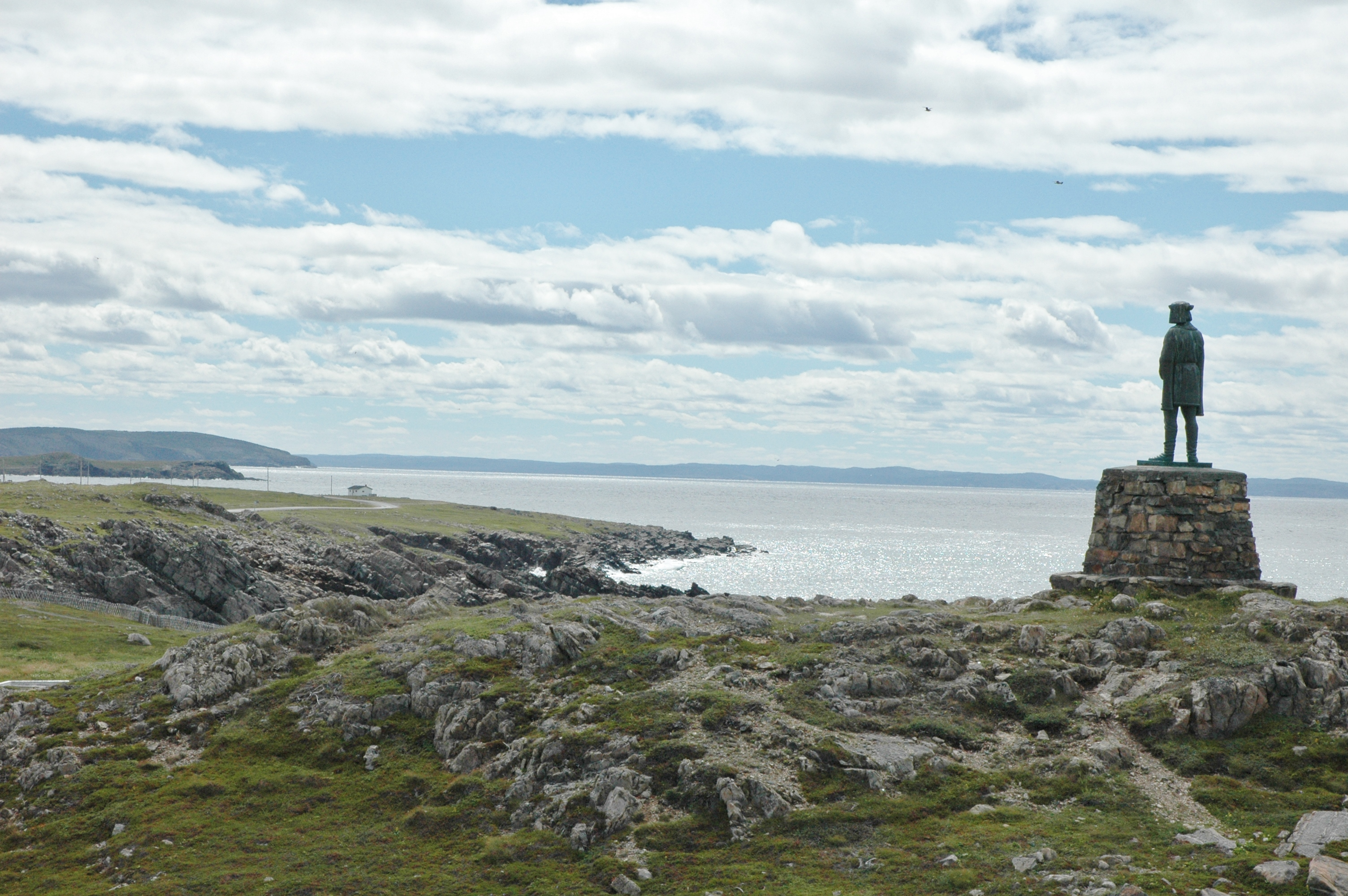
A statue of the Italian explorer John Cabot gazing across Bonavista Bay in eastern Newfoundland

World map of Waldseemüller (Germany, 1507), which first used the name America (in the lower-left section, over South America). The name America derives from the Italian explorer Amerigo Vespucci.

Another Italian, John Cabot (Italian: Giovanni Caboto [dʒoˈvanni kaˈbɔːto]), together with his son Sebastian, explored the eastern seaboard of North America for Henry VII in the early 16th century. The historian Alwyn Ruddock worked on Cabot and his era for 35 years. She suggested that Cabot and his expedition successfully returned to England in the spring of 1500. She claimed their return followed an epic two-year exploration of the east coast of North America, south into the Chesapeake Bay area and perhaps as far as the Spanish territories in the Caribbean. Her evidence included the well-known world map of the Spanish cartographer Juan de la Cosa. His chart included the North American coast and seas "discovered by the English" between 1497 and 1500.

The Cabot Project at the University of Bristol was organized in 2009 to search for the evidence on which Ruddock's claims rest, as well as to undertake related studies of Cabot and his expeditions. The lead researchers on the project, Evan Jones and Margaret Condon, claim to have found further evidence to support aspects of Ruddock's case, including some of the information she intended to use to argue for a successful return of the 1498 expedition to Bristol. These appear to place John Cabot in London by May 1500, although Jones and Condon have yet to publish their documentation.

The project is collaborating on an archaeological excavation at the community of Carbonear, Newfoundland, located at Conception Bay and believed the likely location for Carbonariis's possible mission settlement. The Archaeology of Historic Carbonear Project, carried out by Memorial University of Newfoundland, has conducted summer fieldwork each season since 2011. So far, it has found evidence of planter habitation since the late 17th century and of trade with Spain through Bilbao, including a Spanish coin minted in Peru.

In 1524 the Florentine explorer Giovanni da Verrazzano (Italian: [dʒoˈvanni da (v)verratˈtsaːno]) was the first European to explore the Atlantic coast of North America between Florida and New Brunswick in 1524. The geographic information derived from this voyage significantly influenced 16th-century cartographers. Despite his discoveries, Verrazzano's reputation did not proliferate as much as other explorers of that era. For example, Verrazzano gave the European name Francesca to the new land that he had seen, in accordance with contemporary practices, after the French king in whose name he sailed. That and other names he bestowed on features he discovered have not survived.

Verrazzano's reputation was particularly obscure in New York City, where the 1609 voyage of Henry Hudson on behalf of the Dutch Republic came to be regarded as the de facto start of European exploration of New York. It was only by a great effort in the 1950s and 1960s that Verrazzano's name and reputation were re-established as the European discoverer of the harbour, during an effort to name the newly built Narrows bridge after him.

The Italian explorer Amerigo Vespucci (Italian: [ameˈriːɡo veˈsputtʃi]) first demonstrated in about 1501 that the New World was not Asia as initially conjectured but a different continent (America is named after him). Between 1497 and 1504, Vespucci participated in at least two voyages of the Age of Discovery, first on behalf of Spain (1499–1500) and then for Portugal (1501–1502). In 1503 and 1505, two booklets were published under his name, containing colourful descriptions of these explorations and other alleged voyages. Both publications were extremely popular and widely read across much of Europe. Although historians still dispute the authorship and veracity of these accounts, at the time they were instrumental in raising awareness of the new discoveries and enhancing the reputation of Vespucci as an explorer and navigator.

Vespucci claimed to have understood, back in 1501 during his Portuguese expedition, that Brazil was part of a fourth continent unknown to Europeans, which he called the "New World". The claim inspired cartographer Martin Waldseemüller to recognize Vespucci's accomplishments in 1507 by applying the Latinized form "America" for the first time to a map showing the New World. Other cartographers followed suit, and by 1538 the tradition of marking the name "America" on maps of the newly discovered continents was secure. It is unknown whether Vespucci was ever aware of these honours. In 1505, he was made a subject of Castile by royal decree and in 1508, he was appointed to the newly created position of piloto mayor (master navigator) for Spain's Casa de Contratación (House of Trade) in Seville, a post he held until his death in 1512.

A number of Italian navigators and explorers in the employ of Spain and France were involved in exploring and mapping their territories, and in establishing settlements; but this did not lead to the permanent presence of Italians in America. In 1539 Marco da Nizza explored the territory that later became the states of Arizona and New Mexico.

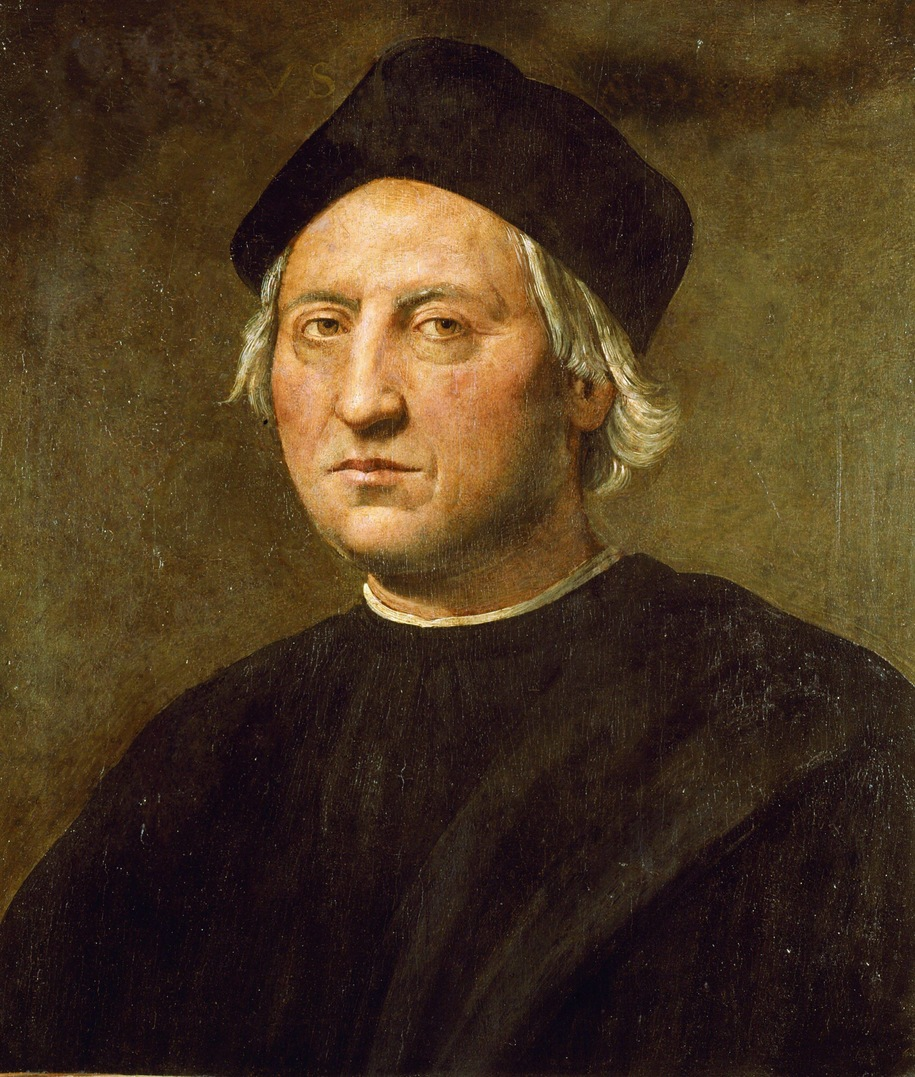
Christopher Columbus

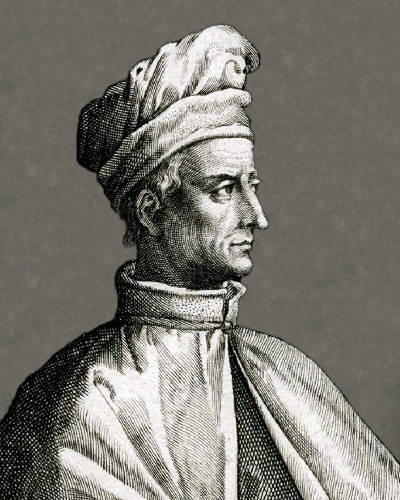
Amerigo Vespucci

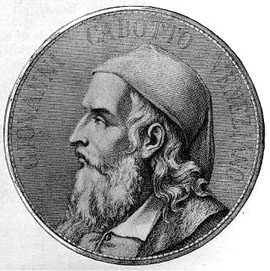
John Cabot

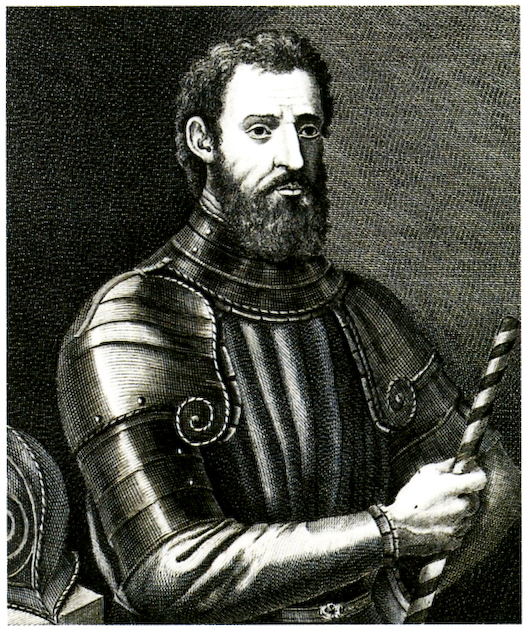
Giovanni da Verrazzano

== Early settlement ==
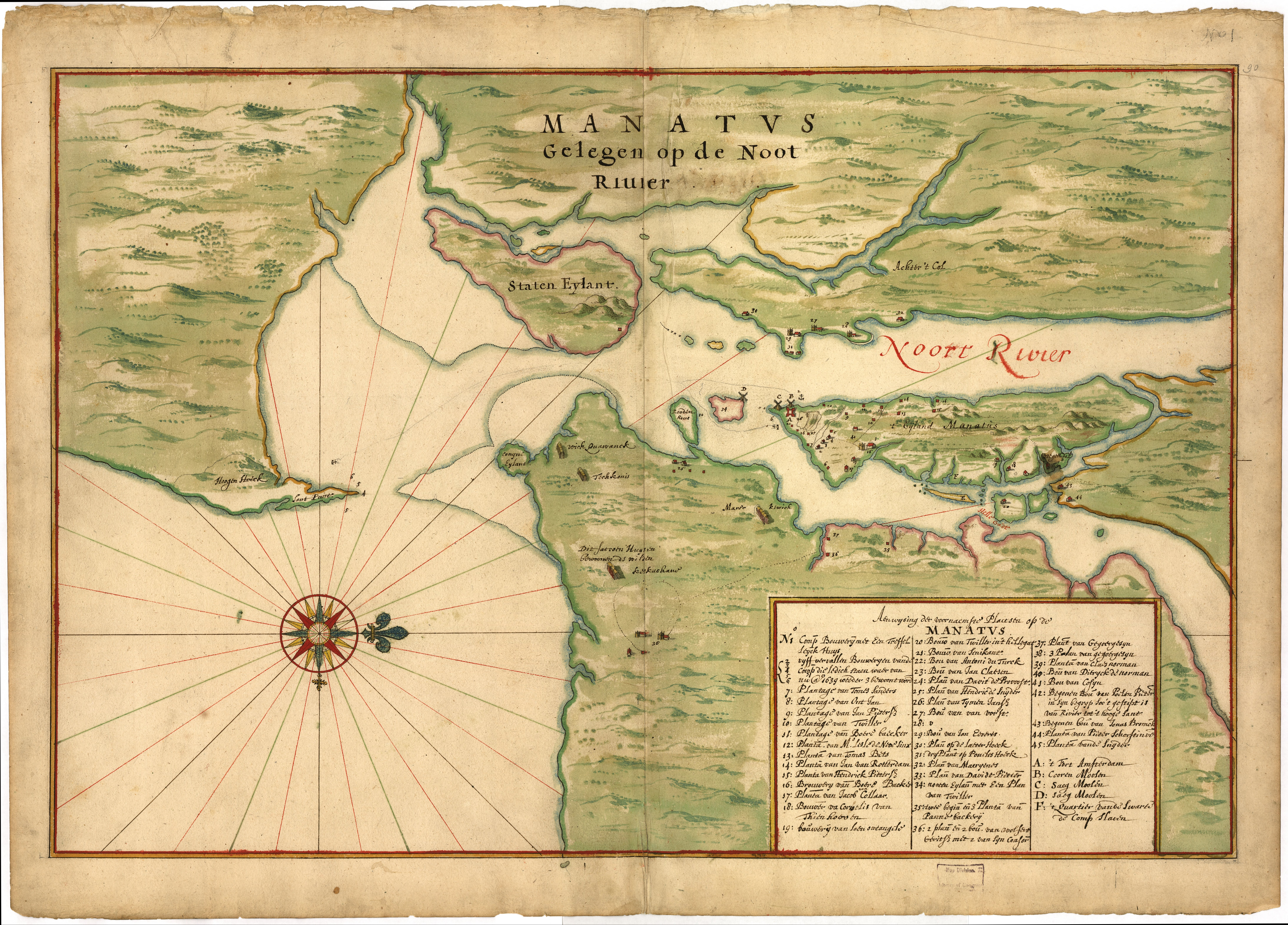
Dutch map (c. 1639) showing New Amsterdam, what would eventually become New York City, the destination of Pietro Cesare Alberti, commonly regarded as the first Italian American

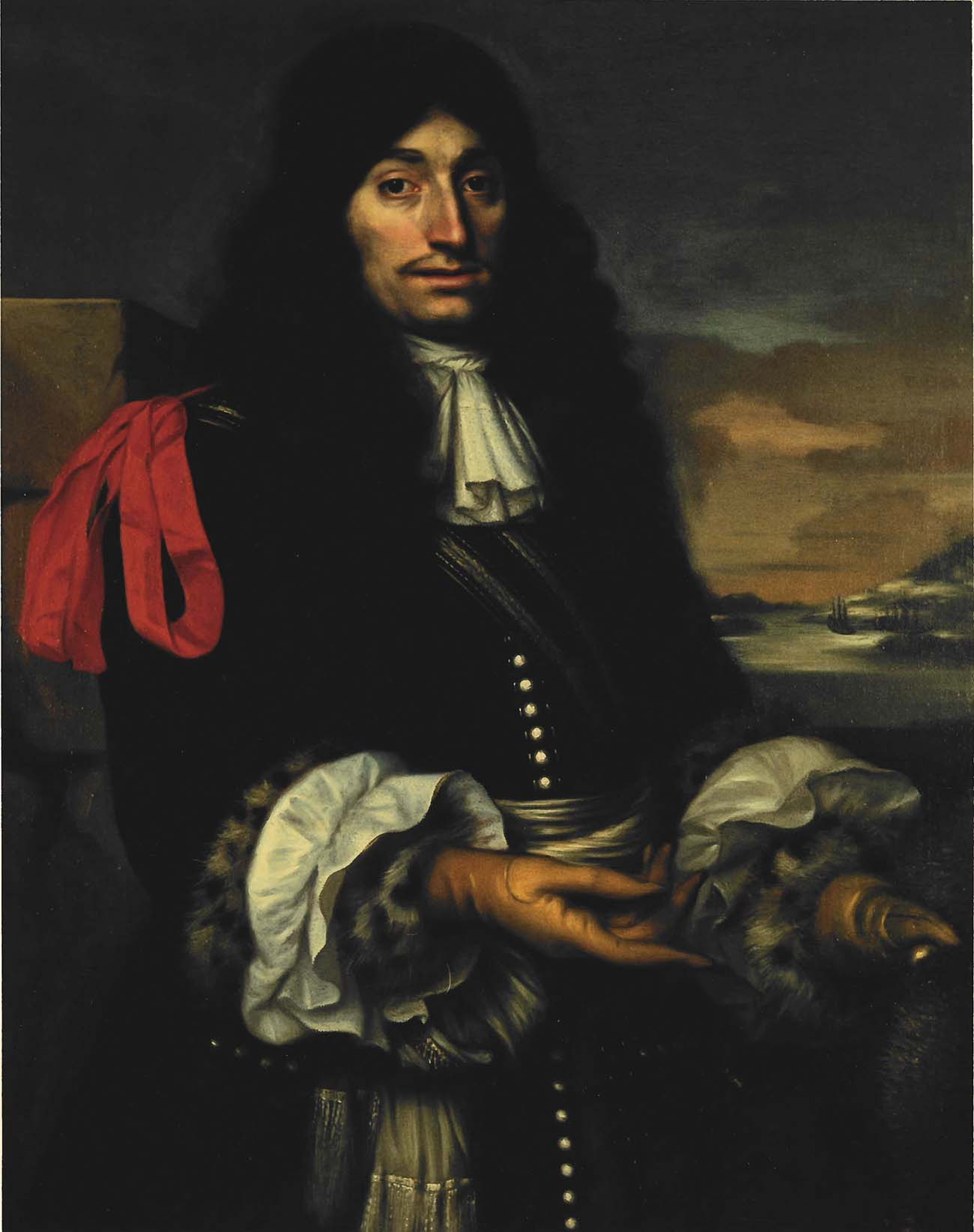
Enrico Tonti, who founded the first European settlement in Illinois in 1679, and in Arkansas in 1683, making him "The Father of Arkansas". He co-founded New Orleans

The first Italian to be registered as residing in the area corresponding to the current U.S. was Pietro Cesare Alberti, commonly regarded as the first Italian American, a Venetian seaman who, in 1635, settled in the Dutch colony of New Amsterdam, what would eventually become New York City. Pietro Alberti was born on the island of Lido at Malamocco in 1608 at the height of Venice's commercial power. During the Thirty Years' War troops from the Netherlands were stationed in Malamocco, a small hamlet on the island of the Lido of Venice. These troops carried with them a particularly virulent strain of bubonic plague. The plague spread rapidly, killing 46,000 of the city's 140,000 residents. The immense decline in Venice's population led to a similar decline in its commercial power. Because the Albertis' power was derived from the success of Venetian traders, Pietro decided at the age of 27 to seek a new life in the New World.

Alberti was the first of millions of Italian Americans who would later form part of American culture. A small stone in New York City's Battery Park, near the bronze statue of Giovanni da Verrazzano, commemorates Pietro Alberti's arrival and declares June 2 to be "Alberti Day". Over the centuries, the family name Alberti had variations in spelling like Albertis, Alburtus, Alburtis and Burtis. Indeed, nearly every American bearing the surnames Burtis and Alburtis can trace their ancestry back to Peter Caesar Alberti.

A small wave of Protestants, known as Waldensians, who were of French and northern Italian heritage (specifically Piedmontese), occurred during the 17th century. The first Waldensians began arriving around 1640, with the majority coming between 1654 and 1663. They spread out across what was then called New Netherland, and what would become New York, New Jersey and the Lower Delaware River regions. The total American Waldensian population that immigrated to New Netherland is currently unknown; however, a 1671 Dutch record indicates that, in 1656 alone, the Duchy of Savoy near Turin, Italy, had exiled 300 Waldensians due to their Protestant faith.

Enrico Tonti (Henri de Tonti), together with the French explorer René-Robert Cavelier, Sieur de La Salle, explored the Great Lakes region. Tonti founded the first European settlement in Illinois in 1679 and in Arkansas in 1683, known as Poste de Arkansea, making him "The Father of Arkansas". With LaSalle, he co-founded New Orleans, and was governor of the Louisiana Territory for the next 20 years. His brother Alfonso Tonti, with French explorer Antoine de la Mothe Cadillac, was the co-founder of Detroit in 1701, and was its acting colonial governor for 12 years. Enrico Tonti was one of the first explorers to navigate and sail the upper Great Lakes. He also sailed the Illinois and the Mississippi, to its mouth and thereupon claimed the length of the Mississippi for Louis XIV of France. He is credited with founding the settlement that would become Peoria, Illinois.

Spain and France were Catholic countries and sent many missionaries to convert the native American population. Included among these missionaries were numerous Italians. In 1519–25, Alessandro Geraldini was the first Catholic bishop in the Americas, at Santo Domingo. Father François-Joseph Bressani (Francesco Giuseppe Bressani) labored among the Algonquin and Huron peoples in the early 17th century. The southwest and California were explored and mapped by Italian Jesuit priest Eusebio Kino (Chino) in the late 17th and early 18th centuries. His statue, commissioned by the state of Arizona, is displayed in the United States Capitol Visitor Center.

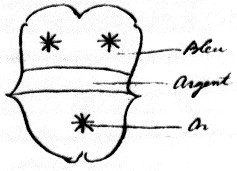
Arms of Taliaferro family of Tuscany. Sketch sent from Thomas Jefferson to George Wythe, 1786

The Taliaferro family (originally Tagliaferro), believed to have roots in Venice, was one of the First Families to settle Virginia. The Wythe House, a historic Georgian home built in Williamsburg, Virginia in 1754, was designed by architect Richard Taliaferro for his son-in-law, American Founding Father George Wythe, who married Richard's daughter Elizabeth Taliaferro. The elder Taliaferro designed much of Colonial Williamsburg including the Governor's Palace, the Capitol of the Colony of Virginia, and the President's House at the College of William & Mary.

Francesco Maria de Reggio, an Italian nobleman of the House of Este who served under the French as François Marie, Chevalier de Reggio, came to Louisiana in 1747 where King Louis XV appointed him Captain General of French Louisiana, until 1763. Scion of the De Reggios, a Louisiana Creole first family of St. Bernard Parish, Louisiana, Francesco Maria's granddaughter Hélène Judith de Reggio would give birth to famed Confederate General P. G. T. Beauregard.

A colonial merchant, Francis Ferrari of Genoa, was naturalized as a citizen of Rhode Island in 1752. He died in 1753 and in his will speaks of Genoa, his ownership of three ships, cargo of wine and his wife Mary, who went on to own one of the oldest coffee houses in America, the Merchant Coffee House of New York on Wall Street at Water St. Her Merchant Coffee House moved across Wall Street in 1772, retaining the same name and patronage. In 1774–1775 Pietro Sodi was the first famous Italian ballet master to come to the United States.

== 1776 to 1850 ==
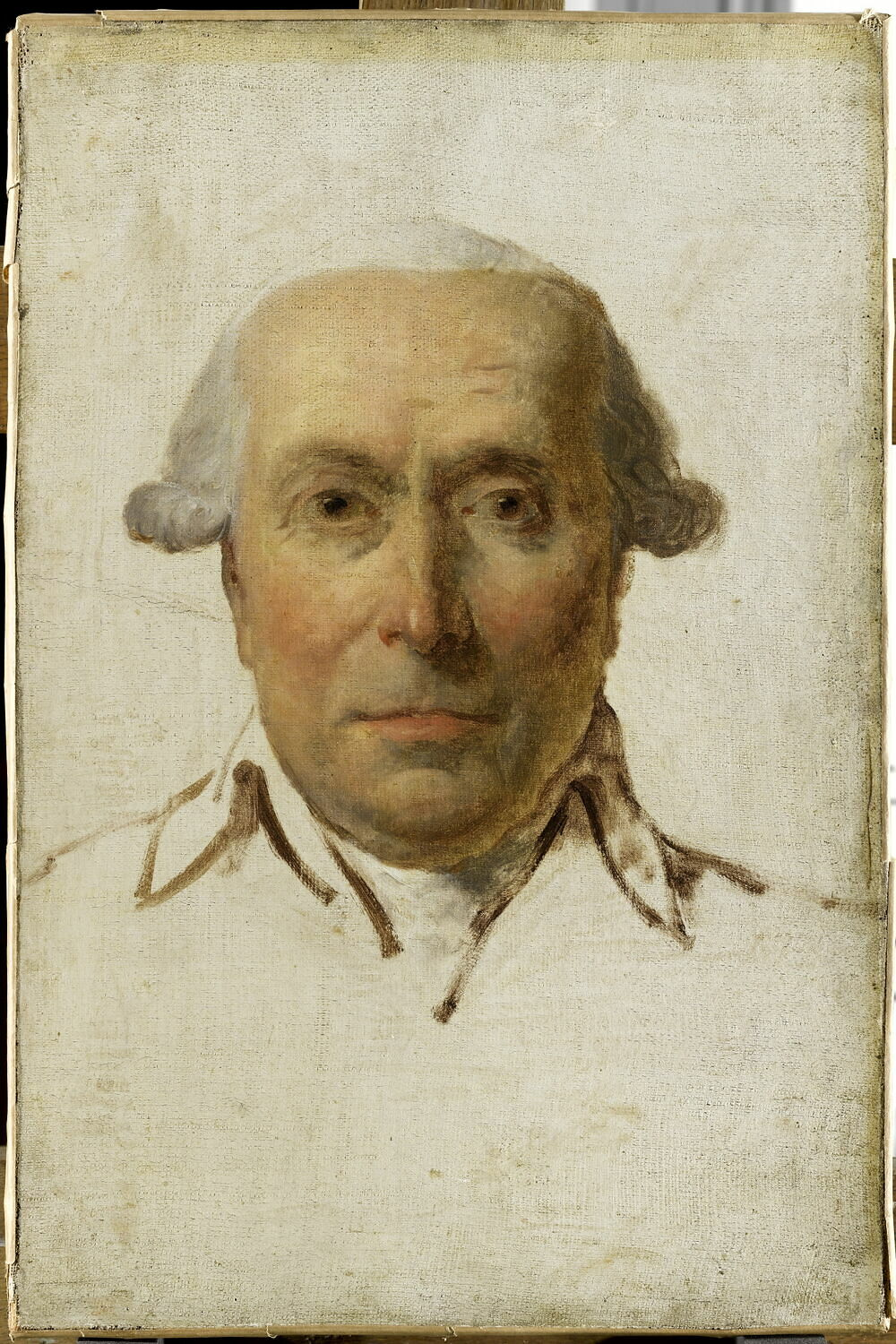
Filippo Mazzei, an Italian physician, philosopher, diplomat, and author, whose phrase "All men are by nature equally free and independent" was incorporated into the United States Declaration of Independence

This period saw a small stream of new arrivals from Italy. Some brought skills in agriculture and the making of glass, silk and wine, while others brought skills as musicians.

In 1773–1785, Filippo Mazzei, a physician, philosopher, diplomat, and author, was a close friend and confidant of Thomas Jefferson. He published a pamphlet containing the phrase, which Jefferson incorporated essentially intact into the Declaration of Independence:

Tutti gli uomini sono per natura egualmente liberi e indipendenti. Quest'eguaglianza è necessaria per costituire un governo libero. Bisogna che ognuno sia uguale all'altro nel diritto naturale.

Translated by Jefferson as follow:

All men are by nature equally free and independent. Such equality is necessary in order to create a free government. All men must be equal to each other in natural law

Mazzei practiced medicine in Italy and the Middle East for several years before moving to London in 1755 to take up a mercantile career as an importer. In London, he worked as a teacher of Italian language. While in London he met the Americans Benjamin Franklin and Thomas Jefferson of Virginia. While doing work for Franklin, Mazzei shared his idea of importing Tuscan products, wine and olive trees, to the New World. They convinced him to undertake his next venture.

On September 2, 1773, Mazzei boarded a ship from Livorno to the Colony of Virginia, bringing with him plants, seeds, silkworms, and 10 farmers from Lucca. He visited Jefferson at his estate, and the two became good friends. Jefferson gave Mazzei an allotment of land for an experimental plantation. Mazzei purchased more land adjoining this gift of acreage and established a plantation he named Colle. They shared an interest in politics and liberal values, and maintained an active correspondence for the rest of Mazzei's life. The contribution of Filippo Mazzei to the U.S. Declaration of Independence was acknowledged by John F. Kennedy in his book A Nation of Immigrants, in which he states that:

The great doctrine 'All men are created equal' and incorporated into the Declaration of Independence by Thomas Jefferson, was paraphrased from the writing of Philip Mazzei, an Italian-born patriot and pamphleteer, who was a close friend of Jefferson. A few alleged scholars try to discredit Mazzei as the creator of this statement and idea, saying that "there is no mention of it anywhere until after the Declaration was published". This phrase appears in Italian in Mazzei's own hand, written in Italian, several years prior to the writing of the Declaration of Independence. Mazzei and Jefferson often exchanged ideas about true liberty and freedom. No one man can take complete credit for the ideals of American democracy.

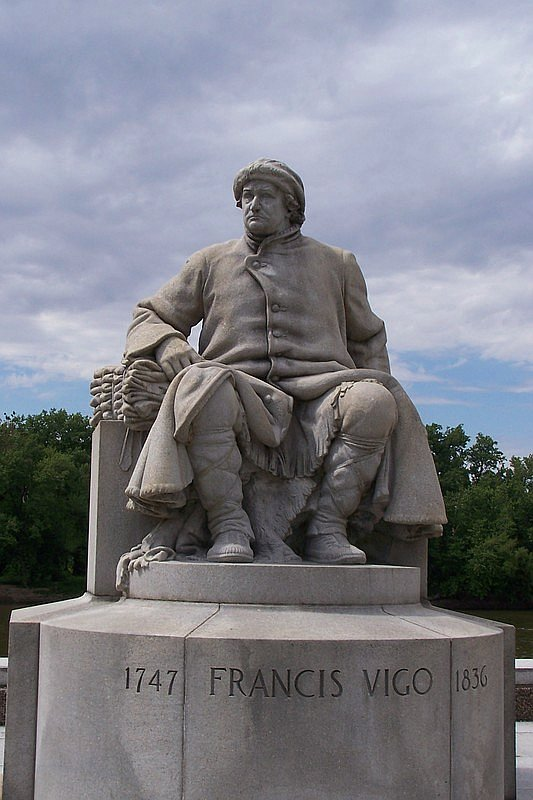
Statue of Francesco Vigo in Vincennes, Indiana, who aided the colonial forces of George Rogers Clark during the American Revolutionary War

Italian Americans served in the American Revolutionary War both as soldiers and officers. Francesco Vigo aided the colonial forces of George Rogers Clark by serving as one of the foremost financiers of the Revolution in the frontier Northwest. Later, he was a co-founder of Vincennes University in Indiana. Born in Mondovì, Italy, he served with the Spanish Army in New Orleans. In 1772 he established a fur trading business in St. Louis. In 1783, Vigo moved to Vincennes, Indiana, and operated a fur trading business there. Vigo County, Indiana, on the Wabash River north of Vincennes, is named for Francis Vigo, as is Vigo, Indiana. The George Rogers Clark National Historical Park erected a statue of Vigo by John Angel in 1934, on the waterfront of the Wabash River. Vigo was featured in a collectors coin to celebrate the bicentennial of Indiana statehood.

There is a strong association between Italian-American cuisine and the history of winemaking in the United States. Many Italian wines were first introduced to the United States in the late 18th century. Italian vintners were first brought to the state of Florida in 1766 by Dr. Andrew Turnbull, a British Consul at Smyrna (now İzmir). Filippo Mazzei also cultivate vineyards, olives, and other Mediterranean fruit with the help of Italians.

After American independence numerous political refugees arrived, most notably: Giuseppe Avezzana, Alessandro Gavazzi, Silvio Pellico, Federico Confalonieri, and Eleuterio Felice Foresti. Giuseppe Garibaldi resided in the United States in 1850–51. At the invitation of Thomas Jefferson, Carlo Bellini became the first professor of modern languages at the College of William & Mary, in the years 1779–1803. Pietro Bachi was the first professor from Italy teaching at Harvard University from 1826 to 1846.

In 1801, Philip Trajetta (Filippo Traetta) established the nation's first conservatory of music in Boston, where, in the first half of the century, organist Charles Nolcini and conductor Louis Ostinelli were also active. In 1805 Thomas Jefferson recruited a group of musicians from Sicily to form a military band, later to become the nucleus of the U.S. Marine Band. The musicians included the young Venerando Pulizzi, who became the first Italian director of the band, and served in this capacity from 1816 to 1827. Francesco Maria Scala, an Italian-born naturalized American citizen, was one of the most important and influential directors of the U.S. Marine Band, from 1855 to 1871, and was credited with the instrumental organization the band still maintains. Joseph Lucchesi, the third Italian leader of the U.S. Marine Band, served from 1844 to 1846. The first opera house in the country opened in 1833 in New York through the efforts of Lorenzo Da Ponte, Mozart's former librettist, who had immigrated to America and had become the first professor of Italian at Columbia College in 1825.

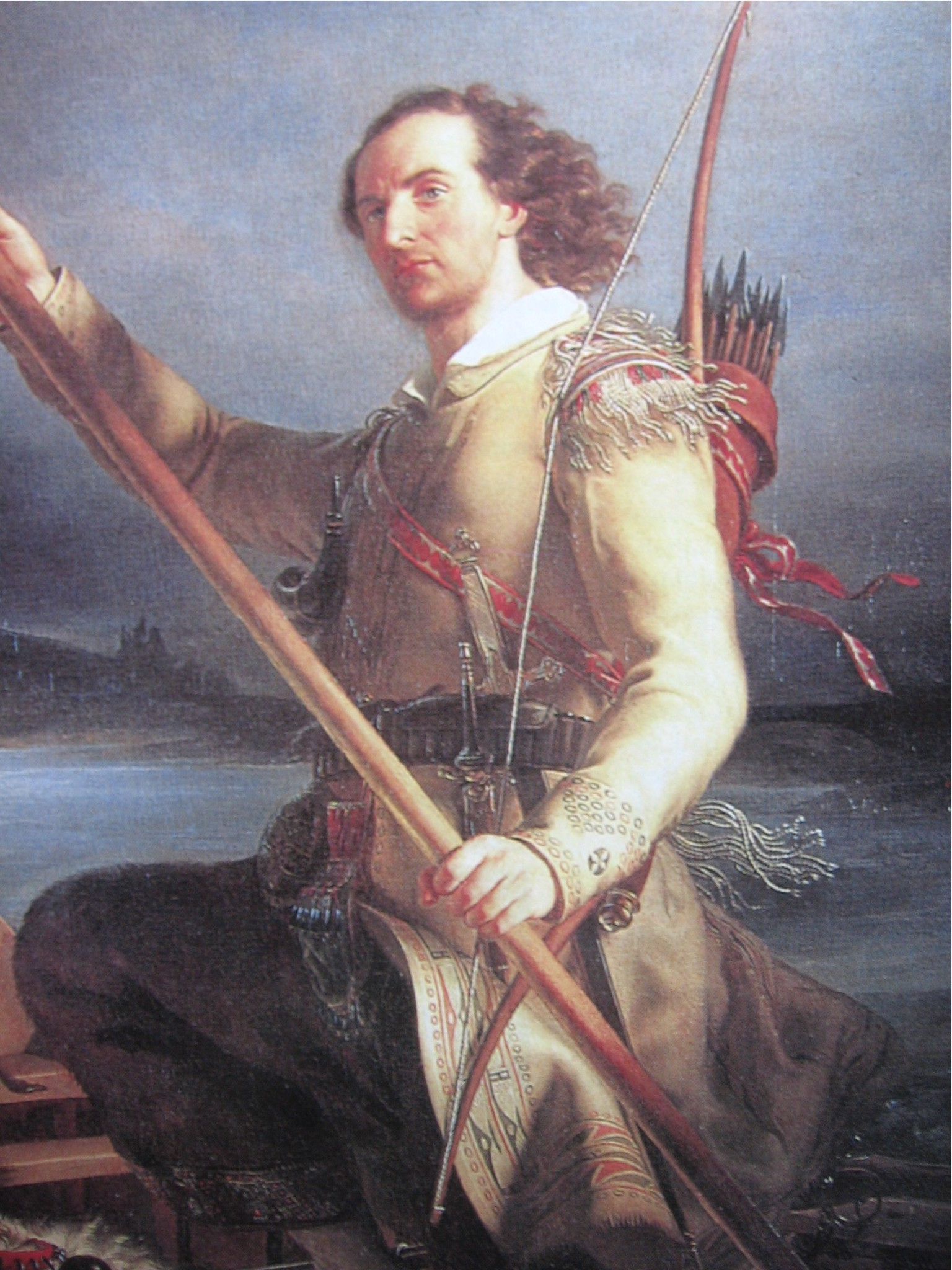
Giacomo Beltrami, who explored the headwater region of the Mississippi River

During this period Italian explorers continued to be active in the West. Alessandro Malaspina undertook a voyage around the world from 1786 to 1788, then, from 1789 to 1794, a scientific expedition (the Malaspina Expedition) throughout the Pacific Ocean, exploring and mapping much of the west coast of the Americas from Cape Horn to the Gulf of Alaska, crossing to Guam and the Philippines, and stopping in New Zealand, Australia, and Tonga. In 1822–23 the headwater region of the Mississippi was explored by Giacomo Beltrami in the territory that was later to become Minnesota, which named a county in his honor. In the U.S. Giacomo Beltrami also began visiting a number of cities. He eventually began a voyage down the Ohio River with the intention of following it to the Mississippi and then south to New Orleans, Louisiana. While on board he met with the prominent United States Indian agent, Lawrence Taliaferro, who was planning to travel upriver on the Mississippi. Beltrami soon became obsessed with the idea of finding the river's source. In 1823, the two later joined with Stephen H. Long as they traveled upriver to Fort Saint Anthony.

Joseph Rosati was named the first Catholic bishop of St. Louis in 1824. In 1830–64 Samuel Mazzuchelli, a missionary and expert in Indian languages, ministered to European colonists and Native Americans in Wisconsin and Iowa for 34 years and, after his death, was declared Venerable by the Catholic Church. Father Charles Constantine Pise, a Jesuit, served as Chaplain of the Senate from 1832 to 1833, the only Catholic priest ever chosen to serve in this capacity.

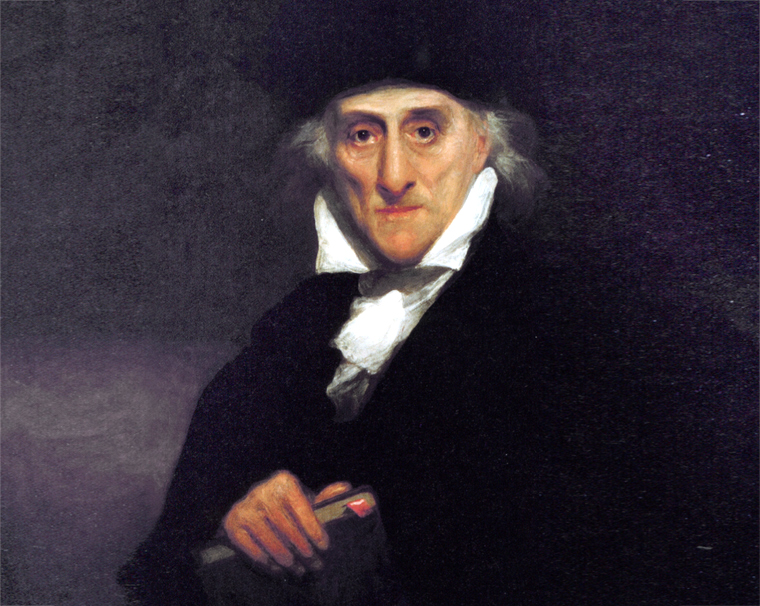
Lorenzo Da Ponte, who was the first to introduce Italian opera to America

In 1833, Lorenzo Da Ponte, formerly Mozart's librettist, and a naturalized U.S. citizen, founded the first opera house in the United States, the Italian Opera House in New York City, which was the predecessor of the New York Academy of Music and of the New York Metropolitan Opera. He was the first professor of Italian literature at Columbia University, and with Manuel Garcia, the first to introduce Italian opera to America. Da Ponte was also a close friend of Mozart and Casanova.

Missionaries of the Jesuit and Franciscan orders were active in many parts of America. Italian Jesuits founded numerous missions, schools and two colleges in the west. Giovanni Nobili founded the Santa Clara College (now Santa Clara University) in 1851. The St. Ignatius Academy (now University of San Francisco) was established by Anthony Maraschi in 1855. The Italian Jesuits also laid the foundation for the wine-making industry that would later flourish in California. In the east, the Italian Franciscans founded hospitals, orphanages, schools, and the St. Bonaventure College (now St. Bonaventure University), established by Panfilo da Magliano in 1858.

In 1837, John Phinizy (Finizzi) became the mayor of Augusta, Georgia. Samuel Wilds Trotti of South Carolina was the first Italian American to serve in the United States House of Representatives. Born in Barnwell, South Carolina, Trotti attended the common schools. He graduated from South Carolina College (now University of South Carolina) at Columbia in 1832. He studied law and was admitted to the bar. He served in the Seminole War. Trotti served as member of the State house of representatives from 1840 to 1841 from 1852 to 1855. He was elected as a Democrat to the Twenty-seventh Congress to fill the vacancy caused by the resignation of Sampson H. Butler and served from December 17, 1842, to March 3, 1843.

In 1849, Francesco, de Casale began publishing the Italian American newspaper L'Eco d'Italia in New York, the first of many to eventually follow. In 1848, Francis Ramacciotti, piano string inventor and manufacturer, immigrated to the U.S. from Tuscany.

== Civil War ==
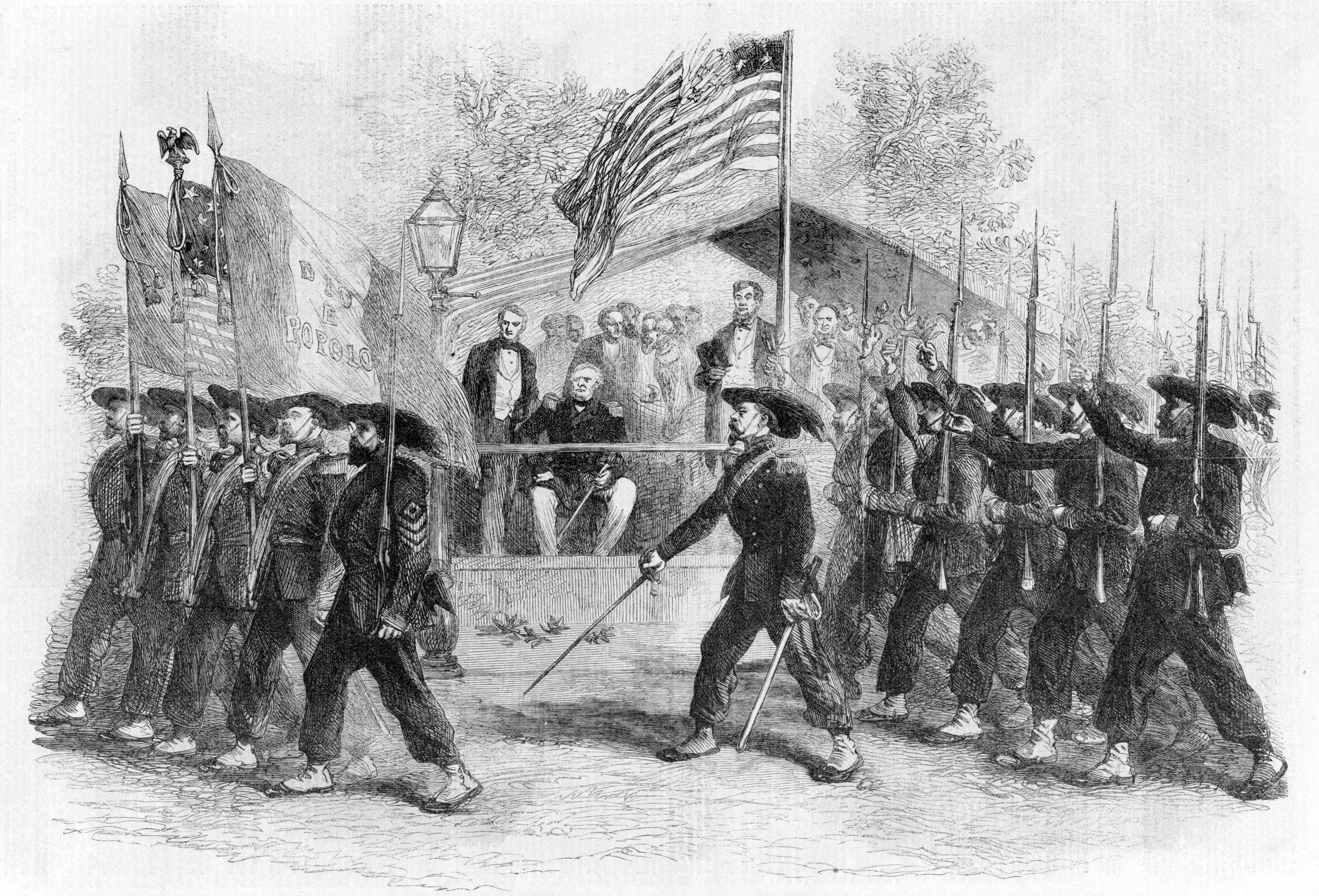
Review of the Garibaldi Guard by President Abraham Lincoln

Between 5,000 and 10,000 Italian Americans fought in the American Civil War. The great majority of Italian Americans, for both demographic and ideological reasons, served in the Union Army (including generals Edward Ferrero and Francis B. Spinola). Some Americans of Italian descent from the disbanded Army of the Two Sicilies defeated by Giuseppe Garibaldi after the Expedition of the Thousand fought in the Confederate Army, such as General William B. Taliaferro (of English-American and Anglo-Italian descent) and P. G. T. Beauregard. Six Italian Americans received the Medal of Honor during the war, among whom was Colonel Luigi Palma di Cesnola, who later became the first Director of the Metropolitan Museum of Arts in New York (1879-1904).

The Garibaldi Guard recruited volunteers for the Union Army from Italy and other European countries to form the 39th New York Infantry. At the outbreak of the American Civil War, Giuseppe Garibaldi was a very popular figure. The 39th New York Volunteer Infantry Regiment, of whose 350 members were Italian, was nicknamed Garibaldi Guard in his honor. The unit wore red shirts and bersaglieri plumes. They carried with them both a Union Flag as well as an Italian flag with the words Dio e popolo, meaning "God and people." In 1861 Garibaldi himself volunteered his services to President Abraham Lincoln. Garibaldi was offered a Major General's commission in the U.S. Army through the letter from Secretary of State William H. Seward to H. S. Sanford, the U.S. Minister at Brussels, July 17, 1861.

Most of the Italian-Americans who joined the Union Army were recruited from New York City. Many Italians of note were interested in the war and joined the army, reaching positions of authority. Brigadier General Edward Ferrero was the original commander of the 51st New York Regiment. He commanded both brigades and divisions in the eastern and western theaters of war and later commanded a division of the United States Colored Troops. Colonel Enrico Fardella, of the same and later of the 85th New York regiment, was made a brevet brigadier general when the war ended. Francis B. Spinola recruited four regiments in New York, was soon appointed Brigadier General by President Abraham Lincoln and given command of the Spinola Brigade. Later he commanded another unit, the famed Excelsior Brigade.

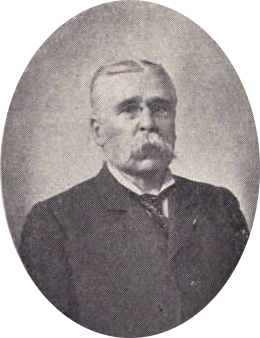
Colonel Luigi Palma di Cesnola commanded a Union cavalry unit during the war.

Colonel Luigi Palma di Cesnola, a former Italian and British soldier and veteran of the Crimean War, commanded the 4th New York Cavalry and would rise to become one of the highest ranking Italian officer in the Union Army. He established a military school in New York City where many young Italians were trained and later served in the Union army. Di Cesnola received the Medal of Honor for his actions during the Battle of Aldie. Two more famous examples were Francesco Casale and Luigi Tinelli, who were instrumental in the formation of the 39th New York Infantry Regiment. According to one evaluation of the Official Records of the Union and Confederate Armies, there were over 200 Italians who served as officers in the U.S. army. At least 260 Italian Americans fought as sailors in the Union Navy.

Several Italian American soldiers of the Confederate States Army were veterans from the Army of the Two Sicilies who had fought against Giuseppe Garibaldi in, and were captured during, the Expedition of the Thousand as part of the unification of Italy. They were released after a treaty between Garibaldi and Chatham Roberdeau Wheat. In December 1860 and few months of 1861, these volunteers were transported to New Orleans with the ships Elisabetta, Olyphant, Utile, Charles & Jane, Washington and Franklin. Most Confederate Italian Americans had settled in Louisiana. The militia of Louisiana had an Italian Guards Battalion that became part of its 6th Regiment. Following the protests of many soldiers, who did not feel like Italian citizens since they fought against the unification of Italy, it was renamed 6th Regiment, European Brigade in 1862.

Among the Confederate officer corps, General William B. Taliaferro had some Italian ancestry as a son of the Taliaferro first family of Virginia, descended from Italians in England in the 1500s who settled the Colony of Virginia in the 1600s. General P. G. T. Beauregard, a Louisiana Creole, had Italian ancestry via his mother Hélène Judith de Reggio, who hailed from a prominent first family of St. Bernard Parish, Louisiana established in 1747 by her grandfather Francesco Maria de Reggio, an Italian nobleman of the House of Este.

== Late 19th century ==
Beginning in 1863, Italian immigrants were one of the principal groups of unskilled laborers, along with the Irish, that built the Transcontinental Railroad west from Omaha, Nebraska.

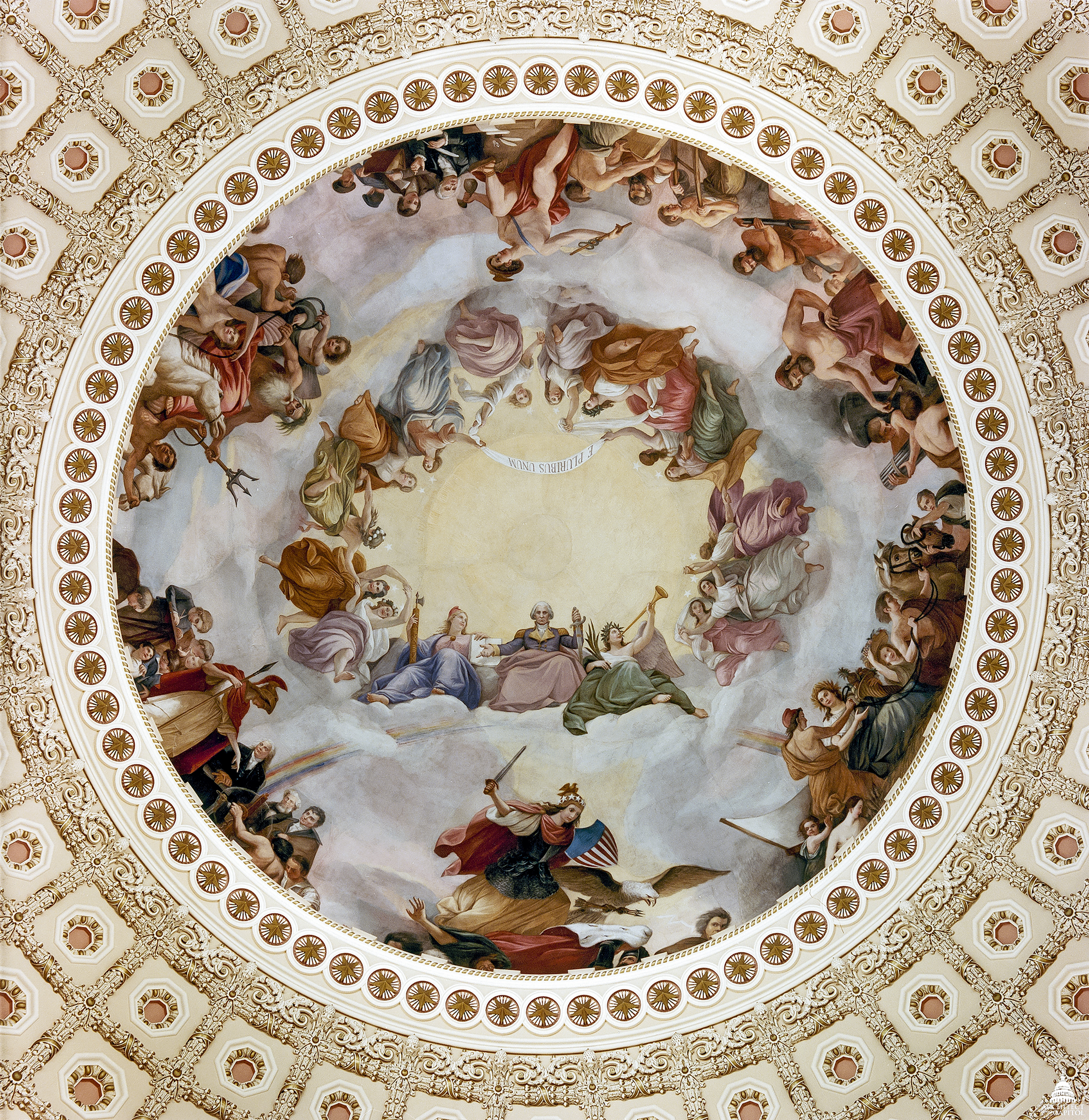
The Apotheosis of Washington on the ceiling of the Capitol rotunda inside the United States Capitol, a fresco painted by Constantino Brumidi

In 1866 Constantino Brumidi completed the frescoed interior of the United States Capitol dome in Washington, and spent the rest of his life executing still other artworks to beautify the Capitol. His first art work in the Capitol Building was in the meeting room of the House Committee on Agriculture. At first he received eight dollars a day, which Jefferson Davis, then Secretary of War of the United States, helped increase to ten dollars. His work attracting much favorable attention, he was given further commissions, and gradually settled into the position of a Government painter. His chief work in Washington was done in the rotunda of the Capitol and included The Apotheosis of Washington in the dome and the Frieze of American History, which contains allegorical scenes from American history. His artistic vision was influenced by the wall paintings of Pompeii and ancient Rome, as well as the classical revivals that characterized the Renaissance and Baroque periods. His work in the rotunda was left unfinished at his death, but he had decorated many other sections of the building, most notably hallways in the Senate side of the Capitol now known as the Brumidi Corridors. Filippo Costaggini continued painting the frieze over the next 8 years based on the sketches Brumidi left; however, there was no sketch left for the final panel, which remained empty until 1953, when Allyn Cox designed and painted it.

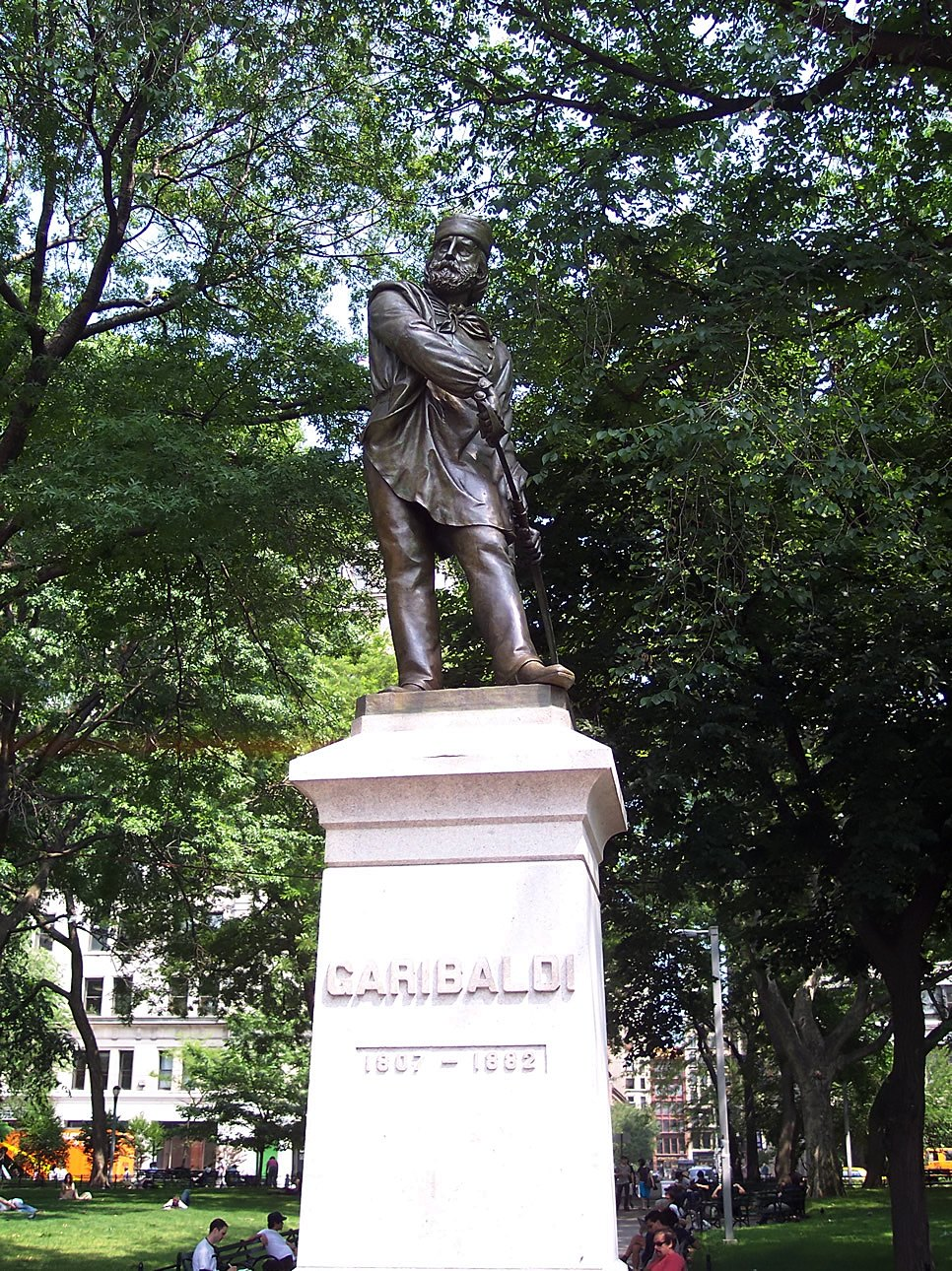
The Statue of Giuseppe Garibaldi by Giovanni Turini, installed in Washington Square Park in Manhattan, New York

Giovanni Turini completed various monumental statues in the United States. He is best remembered as a portrait and historical sculptor. His portrait bust of Giuseppe Mazzini, which he created in 1876 and was dedicated in 1878 was funded by the New York Italian American community and was one of the early examples of public statuary in the city. Turini, who served with Giuseppe Garibaldi as a volunteer during the Third Italian War of Independence in 1866, created Garibaldi's statue in Washington Square Park in 1888. Vincenzo Botta was a politician and professor of Italian language and Italian literature at New York University from 1856 to 1894.

The first Columbus Day celebration took place on October 12, 1792, when the Columbian Order of New York, better known as Tammany Hall, held an event to commemorate the 300th anniversary of the historic landing. The Columbus Obelisk in Baltimore was erected in 1792. Many Italian Americans observe Columbus Day as a celebration of their heritage and not of Columbus himself, and the day was celebrated in New York City on October 12, 1866. The day was first enshrined as a legal holiday in the United States through the lobbying of Angelo Noce, a first-generation American, in Denver. For the 400th anniversary of Christopher Columbus's voyage in 1892, following lynchings in New Orleans, where a mob had murdered 11 Italian immigrants, President Benjamin Harrison declared Columbus Day as a one-time national celebration. The proclamation was part of a wider effort after the lynching incident to placate Italian Americans and ease diplomatic tensions with Italy.

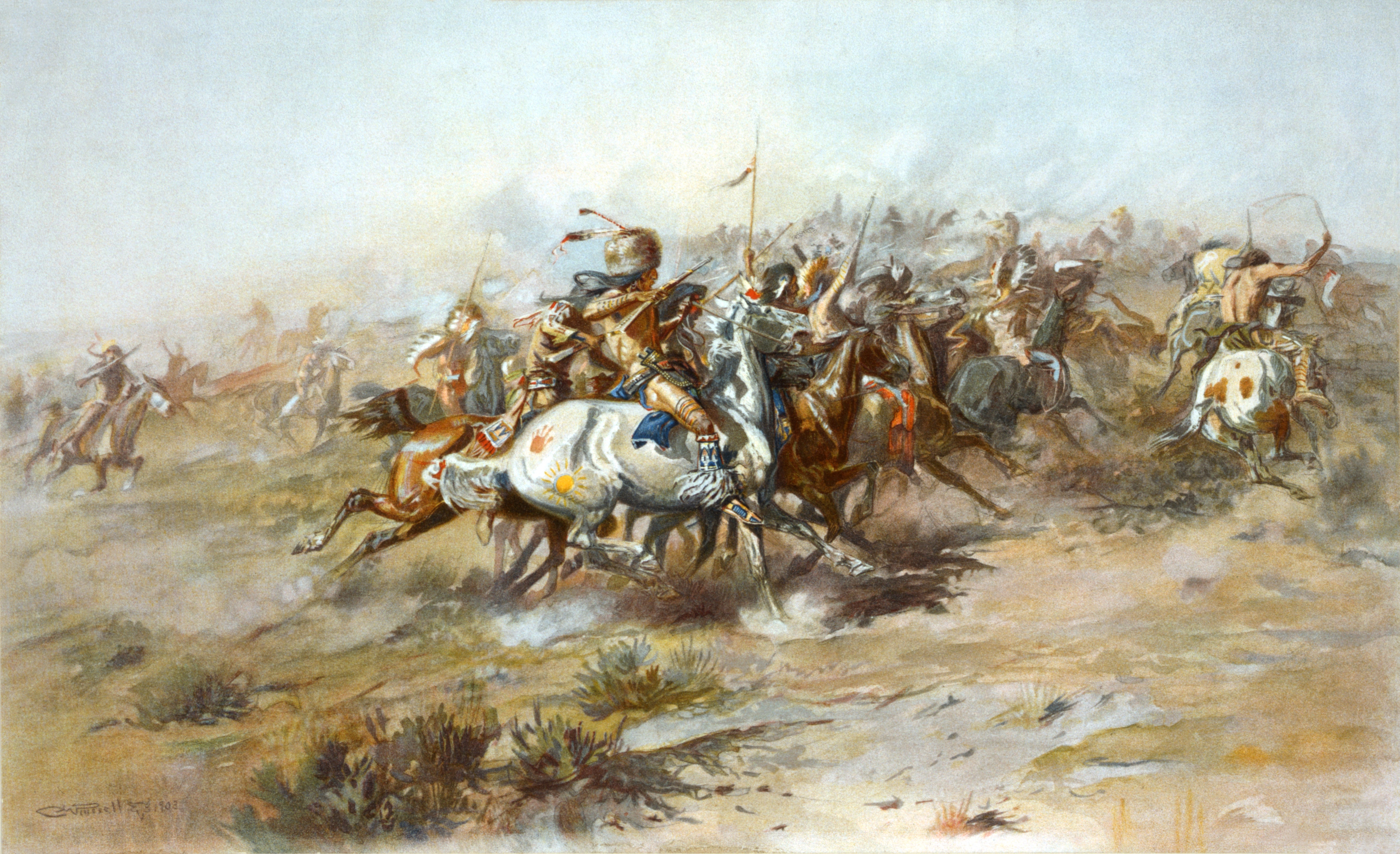
The Battle of the Little Bighorn. The Italian soldier Giovanni Martino was the only survivor from Custer's company at the battle

Giovanni Martino or Giovanni Martini, also known as John Martin, was a soldier and trumpeter who served both in Italy with Giuseppe Garibaldi and in the United States Army, famously in the 7th Cavalry Regiment under George Armstrong Custer, where he became known as the only survivor from Custer's company at the Battle of the Little Bighorn. Francesco Fanciulli was a band director and composer. Between 1892 and 1897 he led the United States Marine Band. In the second half of the 19th century, Italian opera began to establish itself in the United States, starting with San Francisco; Eliza Biscaccianti, Adelina Patti and Pasquale Brignoli were the first Italian singers to take on stardom in the United States. The presence of Italians in the United States was also important in dance with Maria Bonfanti, Rita Sangalli and Giuseppina Morlacchi.

Carlo Gentile, known professionally in his lifetime as Charles Gentile, was a photographer. After travelling the world, he settled in Victoria, British Columbia, for a few years, photographing diverse subjects including the gold fields. In 1867, he moved to California, and lived a restless existence with frequent moves between California and Arizona. In 1871, he purchased a young boy named Wassaja, later named Carlos Montezuma, for 30 silver dollars. In the midst of their travels, they participated in a Wild West Show starring Buffalo Bill. Gentile continued the pursuit of his photographic career in Chicago, while publishing a series of newspapers along with maintaining a weekly magazine.

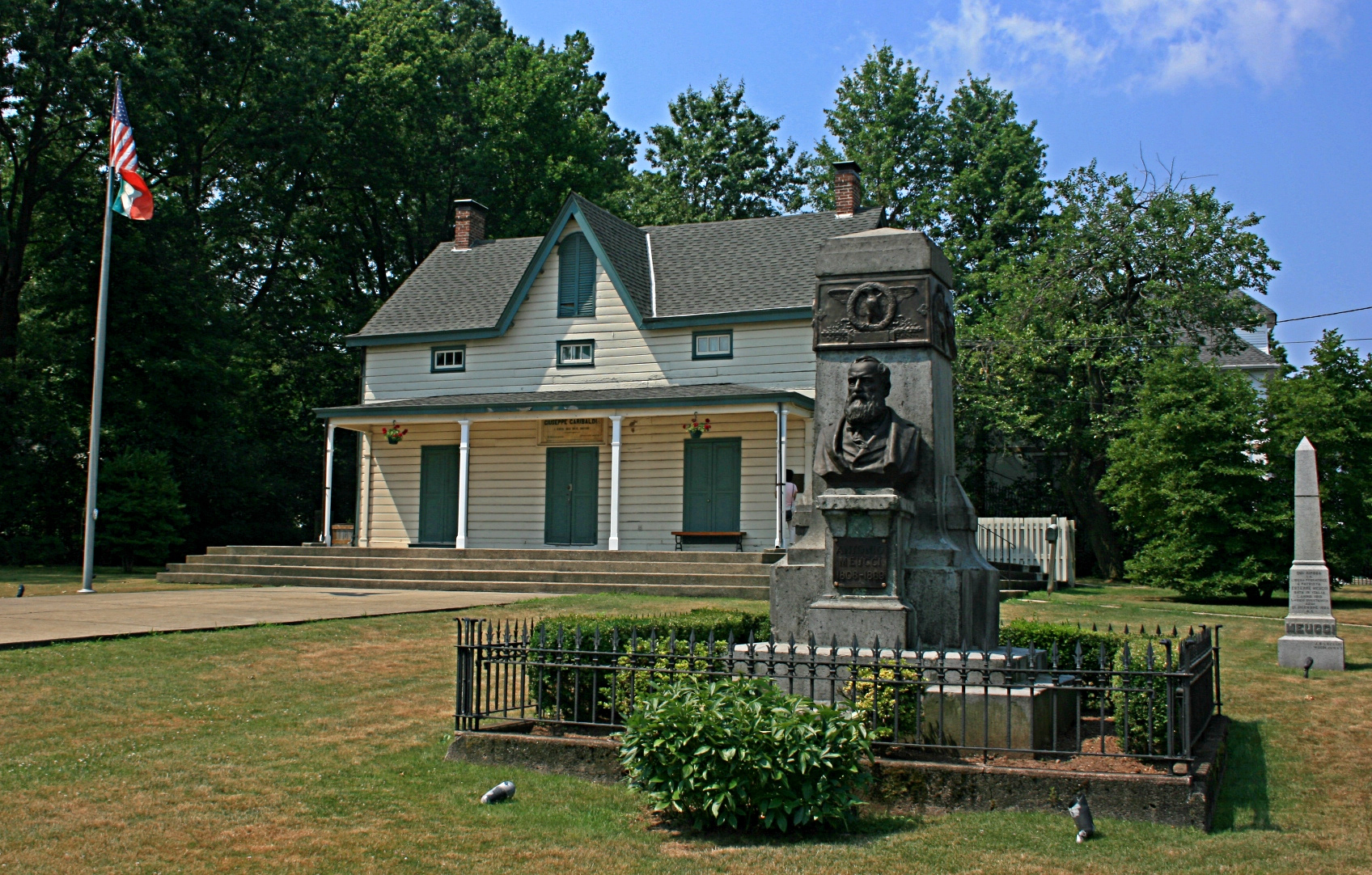
The Garibaldi-Meucci Museum on Staten Island

An immigrant, Antonio Meucci, brought with him a concept for the telephone. He is credited by many researchers with being the first to demonstrate the principle of the telephone in a patent caveat he submitted to the U.S. Patent Office in 1871; however, considerable controversy existed relative to the priority of invention, with Alexander Graham Bell also being accorded this distinction. (In 2002, the U.S. House of Representatives passed a resolution on Meucci (H.R. 269) declaring that "his work in the invention of the telephone should be acknowledged.")

During this period, Italian Americans established a number of institutions of higher learning. Las Vegas College (now Regis University) was established by a group of exiled Italian Jesuits in 1877 in Las Vegas, New Mexico. The Jesuit Giuseppe Cataldo, founded Gonzaga College (now Gonzaga University) in Spokane, Washington in 1887. In 1886, Rabbi Sabato Morais, a Jewish Italian immigrant, was one of the founders and first president of the Jewish Theological Seminary of America in New York. Also during this period, there was a growing presence of Italian Americans in higher education. Vincenzo Botta was a distinguished professor of Italian at New York University from 1856 to 1894, and Gaetano Lanza was a professor of mechanical engineering at the Massachusetts Institute of Technology for over 40 years, beginning in 1871.

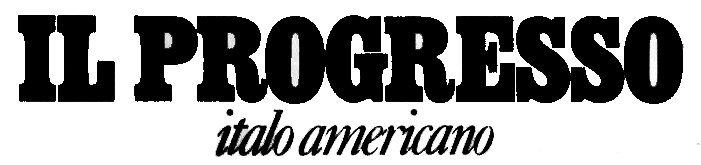
The logo of Il Progresso Italo-Americano daily newspaper

Il Progresso Italo-Americano was an Italian-language daily newspaper in the United States, published in New York City from 1880 to 1988, founded in 1879 by Carlo Barsotti and Vincenzo Polidori, who were also the first editors. It was a bully pulpit for raising funds for monuments by public subscription in the city of New York. From 1888 to 1921 it promoted monuments to Giuseppe Garibaldi, Christopher Columbus, Giuseppe Verdi, Giovanni da Verrazzano and Dante.

Anthony Ghio became the mayor of Texarkana, Texas in 1880. Francis B. Spinola, the first Italian American to be elected to the United States House of Representatives, serving as a representative from New York from 1887 to 1891. He also served as a general in the Union Army during the American Civil War. Following the war, Spinola was a banker and insurance agent and became an influential figure among the rapidly growing Italian immigrant community in the New York City area. He was again a member of the State Assembly (New York Co., 16th D.) in 1877, 1881 and 1883.

== The great Italian diaspora (1880–1914) ==
Italian emigration per region from 1876 to 1900 and from 1901 to 1915

In 1870, prior to the large wave of Italian immigrants to the United States, there were fewer than 25,000 Italian immigrants in America, many of them Northern Italian refugees from the wars that accompanied the Risorgimento—the struggle for Italian reunification and independence from foreign rule which ended in 1870.

Immigration began to increase during the 1870s, when more than twice as many Italians immigrated than during the five previous decades combined. From 1880 to 1914, 13 million Italians migrated out of Italy, making Italy the scene of one of the largest voluntary emigrations in recorded world history.

During this period of mass migration, 4 million Italians arrived in the United States, 3 million of them between 1900 and 1914. They came for the most part from southern Italy: the provinces of Abruzzo, Campania, Apulia, Basilicata, and Calabria and from the island of Sicily. Most planned to stay a few years, then take their earnings and return home. According to historian Thomas J. Archdeacon, 46% of the Italians who entered the U.S. between 1899 and 1924 permanently returned home.

== By location ==
=== Chicago ===
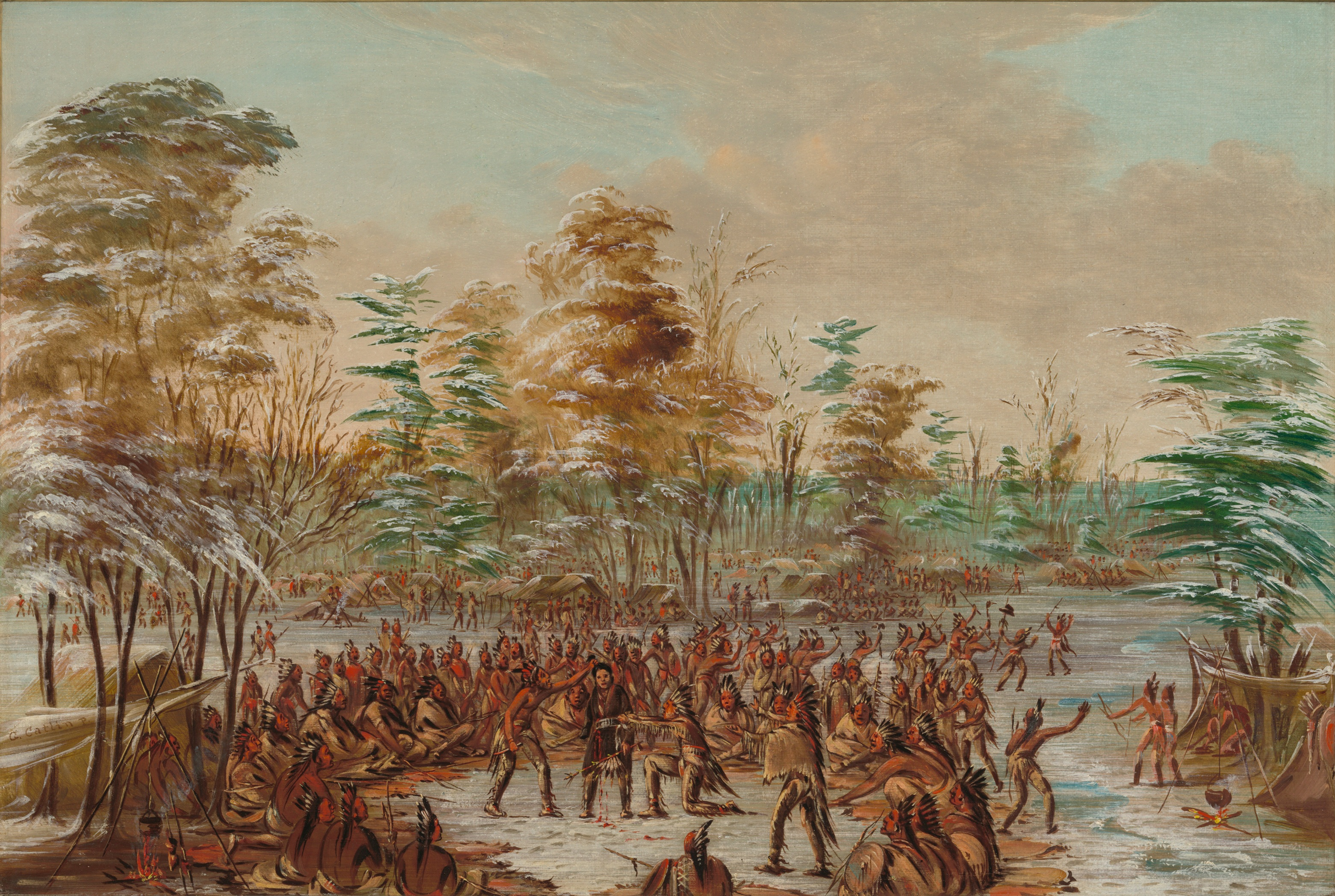
A painting of Enrico Tonti being stabbed during peace negotiations in the Iroquois Village on January 2, 1680, by George Catlin

The first Italian to come to what would become Chicago was Enrico Tonti, who was from Gaeta in Lazio region of central Italy. He was a soldier in service of the French. In the Fall of 1680, Tonti was in the la Salle Expedition and 2nd in command of the company. He and Father Membré, passed through the Chicago Portage from the Illinois valley to go to Green Bay (having reached the Illinois River with La Salle by way of the Kankakee portage). On Jan. 7, 1682, Tonti met La Salle at Chicago, and together with a group of 21 additional Frenchmen and 30 Indians they used the portage on their way to the Mississippi, the mouth of which they reached on April 9, 1682. In 1697, Enrico Tonti, Michel Accault, and François de la Forêt received permission from Governor Frontenac to establish a fortified trading post at Chicagou managed by Pierre de Liette, Tonti's cousin, a Franco-Italian, which lasted until c.1705.

De Liette kept a journal of his experiences living with the Illinois natives for those years he lived with them at the Chicago trading post. De Liette divided his time from 1691 to 1705 between the Miami at Chicago and the Illinois at Fort St. Louis de Pimiteoui, Peoria, which he had helped build. In Chicago, he ran a trading post in partnership with François Daupin de la Forêt, Michel Accault, and Enrico Tonti [located probably near today's Tribune Tower] which he had to close, leaving in 1705 after the king revoked his trading license; continued as French commander and trader in the Illinois country until 1720. From Liette's memoirs: "Most beautiful, you begin to see its fertility at Chicago, unwooded prairies, requiring only to be turned up by the plow, most temperate climate."

In the 1850s, Italians settled in Chicago. Originally, most were Genoese. The first generation worked primarily as merchants, restaurateurs, and fruit sellers. Some worked in the plaster industry. The plaster workers originated from Lucca.

=== Detroit ===
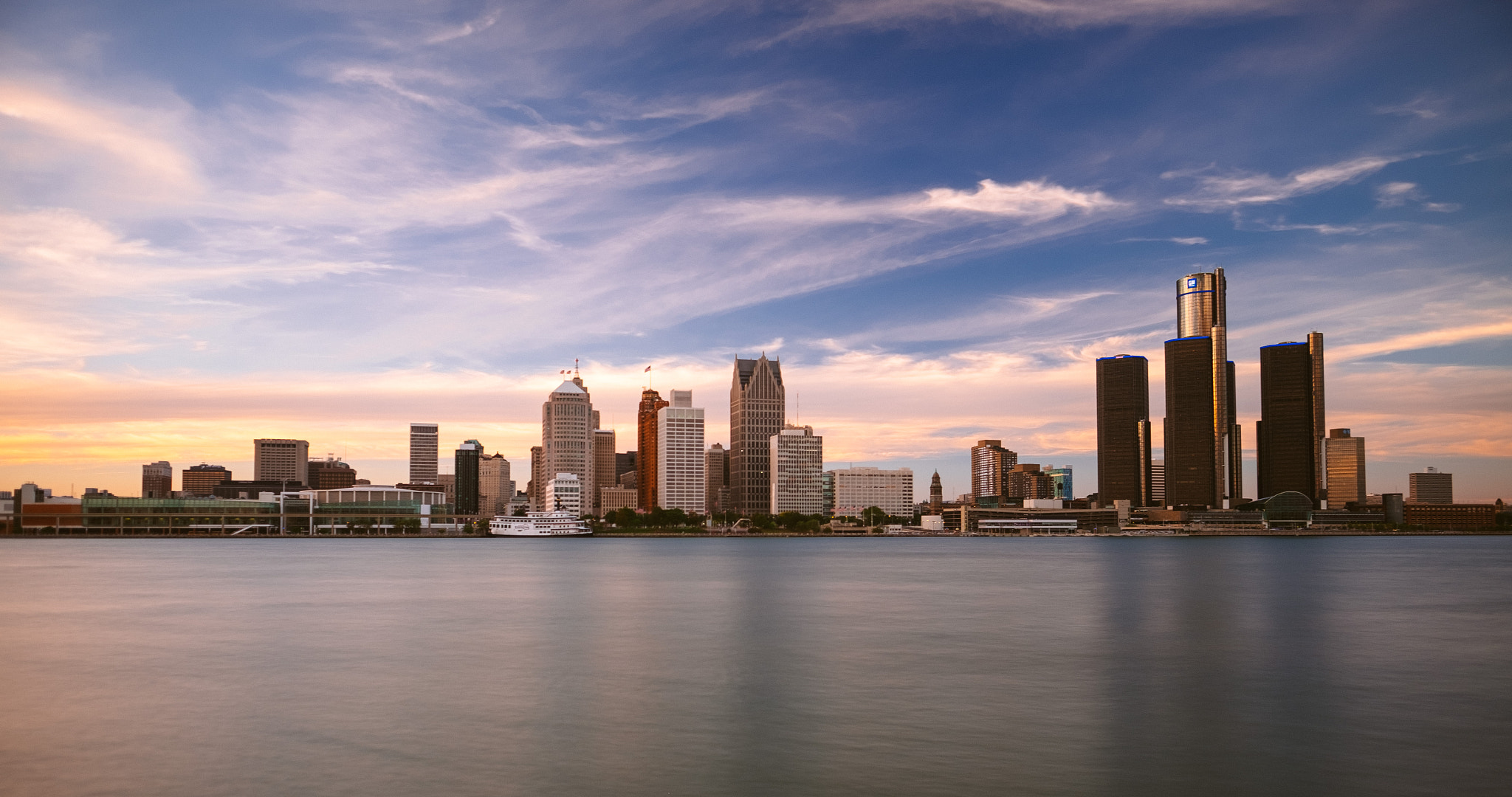
Downtown Detroit skyline. The first Italian American in Detroit was Alfonso Tonti (1659–1727)

The first Italian American in Detroit was Alfonso Tonti, a Frenchman with an Italian immigrant father. He was the second-in-command of Antoine de la Mothe Cadillac, who established Detroit in 1701. Tonti's child, born in 1703, was the first ethnic European child born in Detroit. Tonti became the commander of the Detroit fort after Cadillac left to return to France.

In order to preserve the fur trade, the French administrators and the British administrators discouraged immigration, so the Italian population had slow growth. Growth in immigration increased after Detroit became a part of the United States and the Erie Canal had been constructed. Armando Delicato, author of Italians in Detroit, wrote that Italian immigration to Detroit "lagged behind other cities in the East".

=== New York City ===
The first Italian to reside in New York was Pietro Cesare Alberti, a Venetian seaman who, in 1635, settled in the Dutch colony of New Amsterdam that would eventually become New York. A small wave of Protestants, known as Waldensians, who were of French and northern Italian heritage (specifically Piedmontese), occurred during the 17th century, with the majority coming between 1654 and 1663. A 1671 Dutch record indicates that, in 1656 alone, the Duchy of Savoy near Turin, Italy, had exiled 300 Waldensians due to their Protestant faith.

=== Philadelphia ===
Silvio Pellico, who wrote in "Breve soggiorno in Milano di Battistino Barometro" that some Italian immigrants were going to Philadelphia

During the 18th Century Colonial Era of the United States, the few Italian immigrants to come to Philadelphia came in small numbers and from higher class backgrounds, and these few Italians were often considered to be accomplished in business, art, and music. Some early Italian settlements appeared in South Philadelphia. In contrast to the vast majority of Italian immigrants to Philadelphia that arrived much later and originated from impoverished areas of Southern Italy, Italian immigrants from this period predominantly originated from wealthier areas in Northern Italy and towns within Genoa Province, Liguria, including Genoa and Chiavari, while only a small number came from Veneto.

Donna J. Di Giacomo, author of Italians in Philadelphia, wrote that the first population was "in much smaller numbers" than the mass immigrant groups of the late 19th Century and 20th Century. At the time, many educated Americans had a positive view of classical culture, and thus their view of Northern Italian immigrants was more positive. Among the immigrants of this first period, Lorenzo Da Ponte, who immigrated in 1804, helped introduce Italian Opera in America.

In 1819 Silvio Pellico wrote in "Breve soggiorno in Milano di Battistino Barometro" that some Italian immigrants were going to Philadelphia. Charles L. Flynn Jr. of Assumption College stated in his book review of Building Little Italy that the Philadelphia Italian "community" didn't actually form until the 1850s and 1860s, when it achieved enough size to do so. There were 117 Philadelphia residents at the time known to have been born in Italy. By the 1870 census this increased to 517, with 82% of them living in South Philadelphia.

== See also ==
- Italian Americans
- Italian diaspora
