= Son of the Morning Star (film) =

1991 film

- Based on: Son of the Morning Star by Evan S. Connell
- Written by: Melissa Mathison
- Directed by: Mike Robe
- Starring: Gary Cole
- Music by: Craig Safan
- Country of origin: United States
- Original language: English

Production
- Producers: Preston Fischer; Thom Mount; Cyrus Yavneh
- Cinematography: Kees Van Oostrum
- Editor: Benjamin A. Weissman
- Running time: 187 minutes
- Production companies: Preston Stephen Fischer Company; Republic Television; The Mount Company

Original release
- Network: ABC
- Release: February 3 – February 4, 1991

Son of the Morning Star is a 1991 American two-part Western television miniseries released by Chrysalis based on Evan S. Connell's best-selling 1984 book of the same name. It starred Gary Cole (George Armstrong Custer) and featured Dean Stockwell (General Philip Sheridan), Rosanna Arquette (Elizabeth Custer), Rodney A. Grant (Crazy Horse), Nick Ramus (Red Cloud), Buffy Sainte-Marie (voice of Kate Bighead), and Floyd Red Crow Westerman (Sitting Bull).

== Plot ==
The film, in two parts, begins in 1876 when the Terry-Gibbon column relieves the remnants of the 7th Cavalry that had survived the Battle of the Little Bighorn. They discover Custer's Squadron has been annihilated, and the film 'flashes back' and tells Custer's story from the point of view/narrative of his wife Elizabeth beginning with the Kansas campaign of the mid-1860s.

Concurrently, the Indian perspective is told through the narrative of Kate Bighead, a young Cheyenne woman who encountered Custer on several occasions. Kate Bighead's narrative is also used to describe events like the Fetterman Massacre and the Battle of Washita River to provide a balanced point of view.

== Cast ==
- Gary Cole as Lt. Col. George Armstrong Custer
- Rosanna Arquette as Libby Custer
- Stanley Anderson as Ulysses S. Grant
- Edward Blatchford as Lt. Col. William W. Cooke
- George Dickerson as William Tecumseh Sherman
- Rodney A. Grant as Crazy Horse
- Tom O'Brien as Charley Reynolds
- Terry O'Quinn as Alfred Terry
- Nick Ramus as Red Cloud
- Tim Ransom as Thomas Custer
- Robert Schenkkan as Thomas Weir
- David Strathairn as Frederick William Benteen
- Kimberly Guerrero as Kate Bighead
- Buffy Sainte-Marie as Kate Bighead (voice)
- Demina Becker as young Kate Bighead
- Dean Stockwell as General Philip Sheridan
- George K. Sullivan as General Winfield Scott Hancock
- Michael Medeiros as Major Marcus Reno
- George American Horse as Stone Forehead
- Floyd Red Crow Westerman as Sitting Bull
- Sheldon Peters Wolfchild as Bloody Knife
- Rion Hunter as Sioux Interpreter
- Russ Walks as Autie Reed
- Bryce Chamberlain as Parsons
- Peter Leitner as Dr. Coates
- Mike Casey as Charles Varnum
- Sav Farrow as Giovanni Martinii
- Wendy Feder as Maggie Calhoun
- Patrick Johnston as Boston Custer
- Eric Lawson as Fred Gerard
- Jay Bernard as Congressman
- Mike Bacarella as Adjutant at Ft. Lincoln (uncredited)

== Production ==
The release of the mini-series closely followed the theatrical release of Dances with Wolves. Although Kevin Costner was the first choice to play Custer, the role eventually went to Gary Cole. The movie was partially filmed on private property near the Little Bighorn National Monument in Montana near Billings, where a fort was built at a cost of $200,000. Filming also took place in South Dakota at Buffalo Gap and Badlands National Park. 400 horses and 150 Native Americans were employed for the shoot. The 7th Cavalry consisted of 100 historical re-enactors who also doubled as technical advisers for the film.

== Reception ==
Variety praised the production as "a master work", with special mentions of quality in production, direction, cinematography and editing. New York magazine drew a comparison with the recently released Dances with Wolves, stating that Son of the Morning Star "deals in delusions instead of dreams".

The mini-series won four 1991 Emmy Awards for Outstanding Achievement In Costuming for a Miniseries or a Special, Outstanding Achievement In Makeup for a Miniseries or a Special, Outstanding Sound Editing for a Miniseries or a Special, and Outstanding Sound Mixing for a Drama Miniseries or a Special. It was also nominated for but did not win Outstanding Achievement in Hairstyling for a Miniseries or a Special.
