= Peter Alberti =

Peter Alberti may refer to:

- Peter Adler Alberti (1851–1932), Danish politician and swindler
- Peter Caesar Alberti (1608–1655), regarded as the first Italian American settler in what is now New York State
