= Fred Gerard =

American soldier and frontiersman (1829-1913)

Fredric Frances Gerard
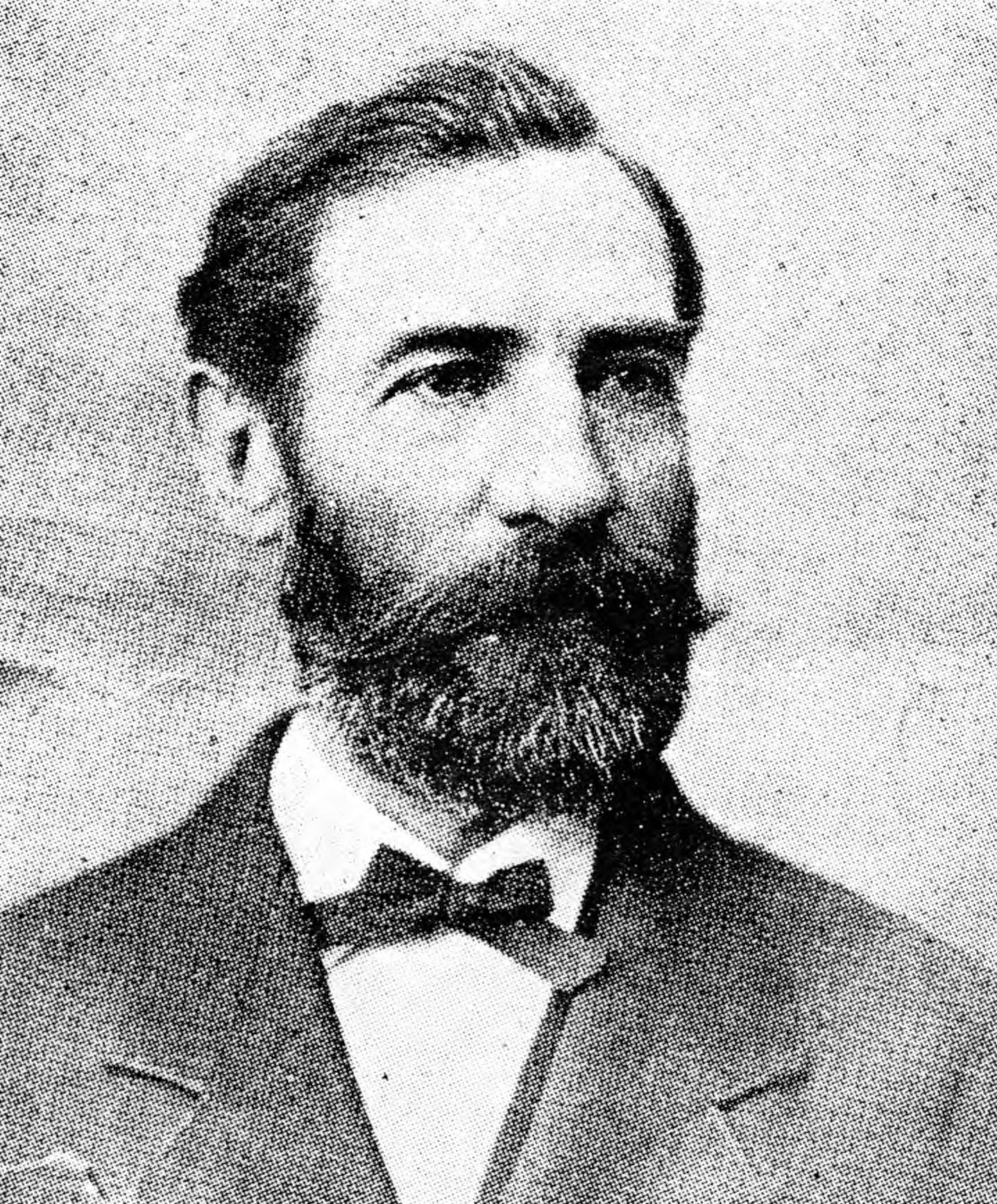
- Born: November 14, 1829; St. Louis, Missouri, US
- Died: January 30, 1913 (aged 83–84); St. Cloud, Minnesota, US
- Military career
- Allegiance: United States
- Branch: United States Army
- Rank: Scout
- Unit: 7th U.S. Cavalry
- Conflicts: Little Bighorn Campaign

Fredric Frances Gerard (November 14, 1829 – January 30, 1913) was an American frontiersman, army scout, and civilian interpreter for George Armstrong Custer's 7th U.S. Cavalry during the Little Bighorn Campaign.

== Early life ==
Fred Gerard was born in St. Louis on November 14, 1829, to Francois and Catherine Gerard. He was educated at Xavier College.

== Trader ==
Gerard moved to Fort Pierre, South Dakota in 1848 to work as a trapper for the American Fur Company. He later traveled farther up the Missouri River to Fort Clark, where he learned to speak Arikara.

In 1855, the American Fur Company transferred him to Fort Berthold in the Dakota Territory. He remained there until 1869. After 1869, he became an independent trader and had stores at Fort Berthold, Fort Stevenson, Fort Buford, and Montana.

He eventually gave up the fur trade attempted to start a ranch west of Bismarck, North Dakota, across the Missouri River. He staked out a claim but, when the Northern Pacific Railroad determined its route, the land was properly claimed by the company. However, in exchange for services, the railroad awarded him with 40 acres of land between the Missouri and Heart Rivers (in present day Mandan).

== Military interpreter ==
Gerard worked as an interpreter because he could speak multiple languages: English, French, Sioux, Arikara, and Chippewa.

Gerard was hired by Lieutenant Colonel Custer to serve at Fort Abraham Lincoln as an interpreter for his Arikara "Ree" scouts, as he was very familiar with the language from his years as a trader. He had lived in Indian country for 31 years at the time and had been involved in several battles.

About dawn on the morning of June 25, 1876, Gerard accompanied Custer and the scouts to a high bluff known as the "Crow's Nest" to view the Little Bighorn River valley below. The scouts could see dust kicked up by an immense pony herd, and claimed to see hundreds of lodges, indicating the presence of thousands of Indians. Custer was unable to see what they were describing and was unwilling to listen to their cautions. Not long afterwards, Gerard rode to a small knoll and saw 40 Indians riding off at the gallop. He shouted back to Custer, "Here are your Indians, running like devils!"

Custer soon divided his company into four detachments and attacked. As Major Marcus Reno's battalion, Gerard, and the Rees forded the river, to their surprise they saw large swarms of mounted warriors riding towards them to give battle instead of fleeing at the approach of the cavalry as Custer had presumed. Gerard turned back and overtook Custer's adjutant, Lieutenant William W. Cooke and Captain Myles Keogh, another officer from Custer's column who had accompanied Reno as far as the river. Explaining that the Indians were not fleeing at all but were coming out to fight, Gerard wheeled to rejoin Reno. Cooke and Keogh rejoined Custer and were killed with him and the companies he led.

When Reno retreated to the bluffs from the timber, Gerard was one of about a dozen men left behind. He and Billy Jackson joined Lt. Charles DeRudio and Private Thomas O'Neill, and the four of them spent the rest of the 25th and most of the 26th hiding in the woods. About midday on the 26th, they were discovered by some Indians, and Gerard and Jackson, who had retained their horses, rode off to draw the Indians away from DeRudio and O'Neill, who had lost their mounts.

Gerard served as Dr. Henry Porter's surgical assistant on Reno Hill. Gerard survived the battle and later testified before the Reno Court of Inquiry. In the official transcripts of the Reno Inquiry, his name is misspelled as "Girard".

== Later years ==
In the years following the battle, Gerard returned to civilian life. In the 1880s, he opened a store in Mandan, North Dakota, served on the board of commissioners for Morton County, was appointed the first assessor for the county, and operated a ferry across the Heart River.

In 1890, the Gerard family moved to Saint Paul, Minnesota, where Fred worked in advertising for the Pilsbury Baking Company.

In 1912, Gerard gave his account of the Little Bighorn Battle to writer Fred Dustin, who was compiling personal narratives from survivors. He died in St. Cloud, Minnesota on January 30, 1913, less than a year later after being interviewed. The last few months of his life were spent in the care of the Benedictine nuns at St. Cloud, where two of his daughters lived and worked.

== Family ==
While at Fort Berthold in Dakota Territory, Gerard was for a time married to an Indian woman, the sister of a warrior named Whistling Bear. Her name was Helena Catherine also known as Katie Red Bull, and together they had three daughters: Josephine, Carrie, and Virginia. In 1874, the girls were sent to a Catholic boarding school. Josie and Virginia later joined the Catholic Benedictine Order convent in St. Joseph, Minnesota.

In the late 1860s or early 1870s, Gerard's companion was a woman of the Blackfeet Nation, and together they had one son: Frederic.

In 1879, he married Ella S. Waddell, and together they had four children: Frederic, Birdie, Charles, and Florance.

== Representation in other media ==
Actor Eric Lawson portrayed Fred Gerard in the 1991 film Son of the Morning Star.
