= William W. Cooke =

Union United States Army soldier (1846–1876)

William Winer Cooke
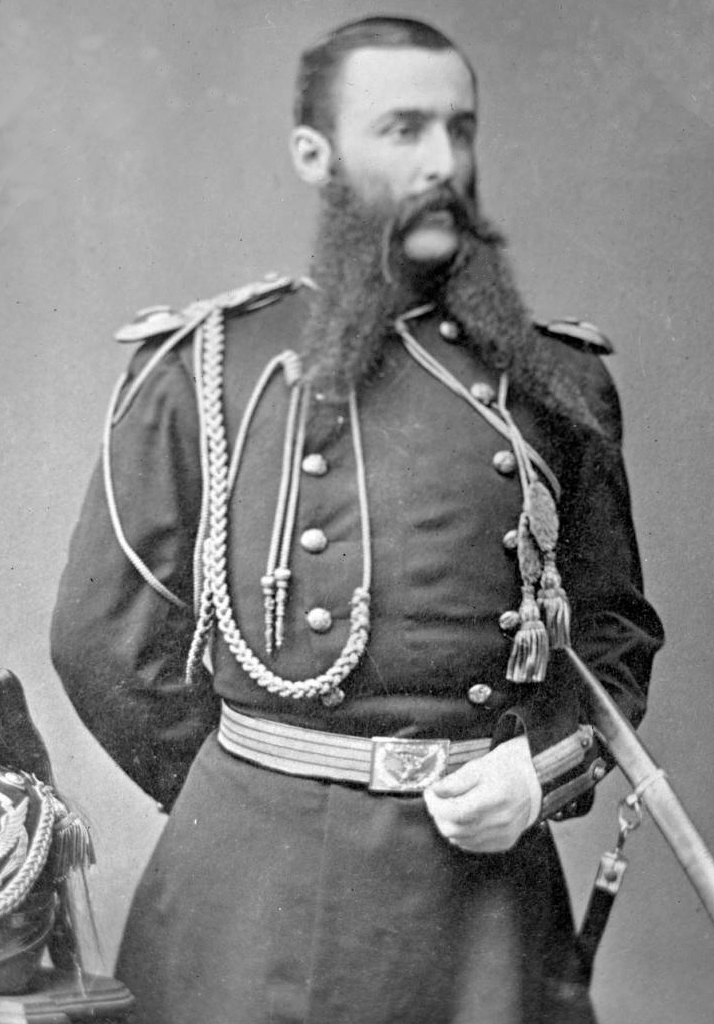
- William W. Cooke
- Born: May 29, 1846; Brantford Township, Ontario, Canada
- Died: June 25, 1876 (aged 30); Montana, US
- Burial place: Hamilton Cemetery; Hamilton, Ontario
- Military career
- Allegiance: United States; Union
- Branch: United States Army; Union Army
- Service years: 1863–76
- Rank: First Lieutenant; Brevet Lieutenant Colonel
- Unit: 7th U.S. Cavalry Regiment
- Conflicts: American Civil War: Siege of Petersburg; Battle of Sayler's Creek; American Indian Wars: Washita Campaign; Battle of Little Big Horn †

William Winer Cooke (May 29, 1846 – June 25, 1876) was a military officer in the United States Army during the American Civil War and the Black Hills War. He was the adjutant for George Armstrong Custer and was killed during the Battle of the Little Bighorn.

== Overview ==
Cooke was born in Mount Pleasant, Brant County, Ontario, to Alexander and Angeline Cooke. He attended the Brantford Collegiate School and the Central School in Hamilton, Ontario. At the age of 14, he moved to Buffalo, New York to continue his studies. After graduating from school, he enlisted in 1863 with the 24th New York Cavalry at Niagara Falls, New York, during the Civil War. After serving as a recruiting officer, he served on the front lines in the IX Corps, commanded by Ambrose Burnside. He was wounded during the Siege of Petersburg. After being released from the hospital, he served on commissary duty. He rose to first lieutenant on December 14, 1864, but did not return to front-line duty until March 1865. He was awarded brevet promotions to captain, major, and lieutenant colonel for his meritorious service during the war, the last of his actions occurred at the Battle of Sayler's Creek during the Appomattox Campaign.

After the war, he immediately joined the 1st New York Provisional Cavalry and applied for a Regular Army commission. He was made a second lieutenant in the U.S. 7th Cavalry Regiment in July 1866, and was promoted to first lieutenant a year later at Fort Harker in Kansas. In 1868, he participated in the Washita Campaign.

In 1871, he became the regimental adjutant under Lt. Col. George Armstrong Custer. Cooke became close friends with Thomas Custer and was a member of the so-called "Custer Clan" or "Custer Gang", a close-knit group of Custer's friends and relatives. He was an excellent shot and one of the fastest runners of the regiment. Some of his troopers took a dislike to him and called him "The Queen's Own". He was known for his dundrearies, or long side whiskers, that he always wore.

== Little Big Horn ==
Cooke was killed at the Battle of the Little Bighorn. His body was found close to his commander. He was the author of the famous "last message" to Frederick Benteen, carried by Sergeant John Martin, that read:

Benteen. Come On. Big village. Be quick. Bring packs. WW Cooke. P.S. Bring Packs.

Cooke ... was scalped twice--the second scalp being one of his prodigiously long flowing sidewhiskers ...

— Evan S. Connell, Son of the Morning Star

Cooke was initially interred on the battlefield. A memorial slab marks the approximate spot where he fell. In June 1877, he was reburied in the Little Bighorn National Cemetery. In August of that year, his family had the remains disinterred again and reburied in the family's plot in the Hamilton Cemetery in Hamilton, Ontario.

The Grand Army of the Republic paid for a grave stone in Hamilton in Cooke's memory and honour.
