= François Marie, Chevalier de Reggio =

Italian nobleman and military commander

Francesco Maria de Reggio, known in French as François Marie, Chevalier de Reggio (Alba, Italy, 1698 – New Orleans, 1787) was an Italian nobleman who was a member of the House of Este. He was a distinguished commander in the War of the Austrian Succession, and an influential government official in Louisiana.

== Biography ==
François Marie was born in Alba, Piedmont, in 1698. He was nephew to the reigning Duke of Modena and Reggio, Francesco III d'Este, Duke of Modena. His mother was Felicite De Canapan, and his father was Rinaldo de Reggio, Chevalier de Reggio, who was the brother of Duke Francesco, and son of Duke Rinaldo d'Este. When his father died, Francois himself became the Chevalier de Reggio. He ruled his lands strongly for many years, but fell victim to boredom. Looking for excitement, Francois moved to France, joined the French Royal Army, and fought in the War of the Austrian Succession with his close friend, the Duke of Richelieu. He proved to be an excellent soldier, and went on to distinguish himself greatly at the Siege of Bergen op Zoom. King Louis XV was so impressed by the Chevalier's valour during the siege, that he gave him a captaincy in the French army, and promoted him to the rank of Captain general. Soon after his promotion in 1747, the king sent Marie to Louisiana, which was a French colony at the time.

François held the title of Captain-General of Louisiana until 1763, when the Spanish Empire took over the French colony. The Chevalier was well liked by the new Spanish officials, and was given a new title in the government of Spanish Louisiana: First Justiciary of the Estates and Property of the Crown. While holding this position, he met a young woman, by the name of Fleuriau. They married, and had many children. In his old age, Francois retired, and died in New Orleans, in 1787.

== Famous descendants ==
Francois Marie, Chevalier de Reggio was the great-grandfather of Confederate General P. G. T. Beauregard, one of the most famous generals in the American Civil War. Among his descendants is also director Godfrey Reggio.
