= Thomas J. Archdeacon =

American historian (born 1942)

- Born: July 5, 1942 (age 84)
- Education: Fordham University; Columbia University
- Occupation: Historian

Thomas J. Archdeacon (born July 5, 1942) is an American historian.

Archdeacon served on the United States Army Reserve from 1964 to 1978, and was on active duty between 1969 and 1972. He graduated from Fordham University in 1964, and pursued graduate study at Columbia University. Archdeacon began teaching at the United States Military Academy in 1969, prior to joining the University of Wisconsin–Madison faculty in 1972. He was awarded a Guggenheim fellowship in 1985.

== Books ==
- Archdeacon, Thomas J. (1976). New York City, 1664 1710: Conquest And Change. Fall Creek Books. ISBN 9780801409448.
- Archdeacon, Thomas J. (1983). Becoming American: An Ethnic History. Free Press. ISBN 9780029009802.
- Archdeacon, Thomas J. (1994). Correlation and Regression Analysis: A Historian's Guide. University of Wisconsin Press. ISBN 9780299136505.
