= Pietro Cesare Alberti =

First Italian American settler of New York

Pietro Cesare Alberti (1608–1655) — later Peter Caesar Alburtus — was a Venetian immigrant to the Dutch colony of New Amsterdam, commonly regarded as the first Italian American settler at least in what is now New York State.

== Background ==
Pietro Alberti was born on the island of Lido at Malamocco in 1608 at the height of Venice's commercial power. There is no evidence for the former assertion that Pietro was the son of the Secretary of the Ducal Treasury, Andrea Alberti and his wife, Lady Veronica Cremona, but his family were apparently a Venetian branch of the powerful Florentine Alberti family and were attested as members of the Church of San Luca from 1326. The family was influential throughout the Italian peninsula and also had a branch in Genoa. Pietro's paternal relatives may have included the famed Italian polymath and statesman Leon Battista Alberti.

== Immigration ==
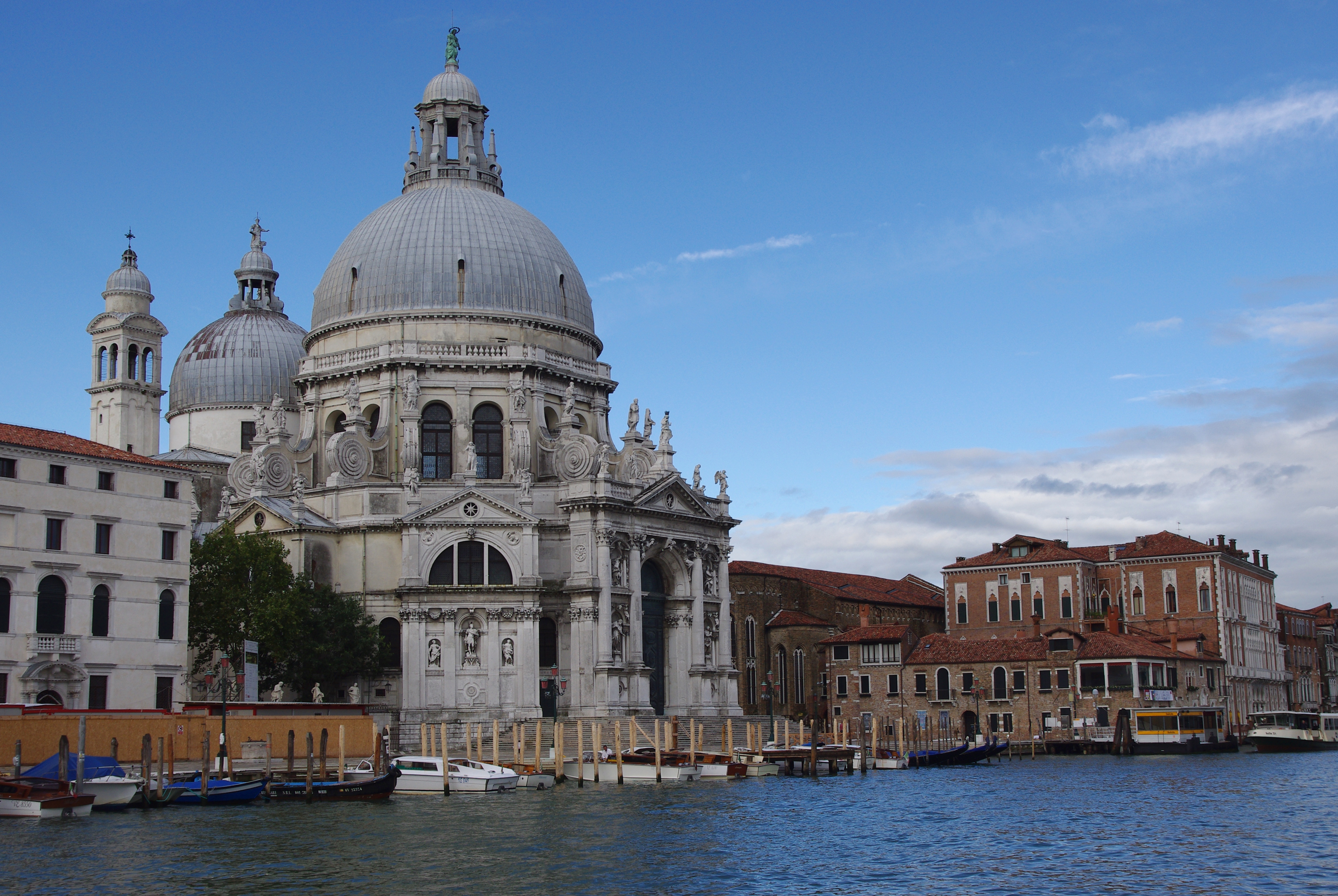
The church of Santa Maria della Salute, begun in 1631, was constructed as a votive offering following the end of the Italian plague of 1629–31.

During the Thirty Years' War, troops from the Netherlands were stationed in Malamocco, a small hamlet on the island of the Lido of Venice. These troops carried with them a particularly virulent strain of bubonic plague. The plague spread rapidly, killing 46,000 of the city's 140,000 residents. The immense decline in Venice's population led to a similar decline in its commercial power. Because the Albertis' power was derived from the success of Venetian traders, Pietro decided at the age of 27 to seek a new life in the New World. At some point, Alberti had also converted to Protestantism. He sailed from Texel aboard the Dutch ship De Coninck David (King David), arriving in New Amsterdam on 2 June 1635.

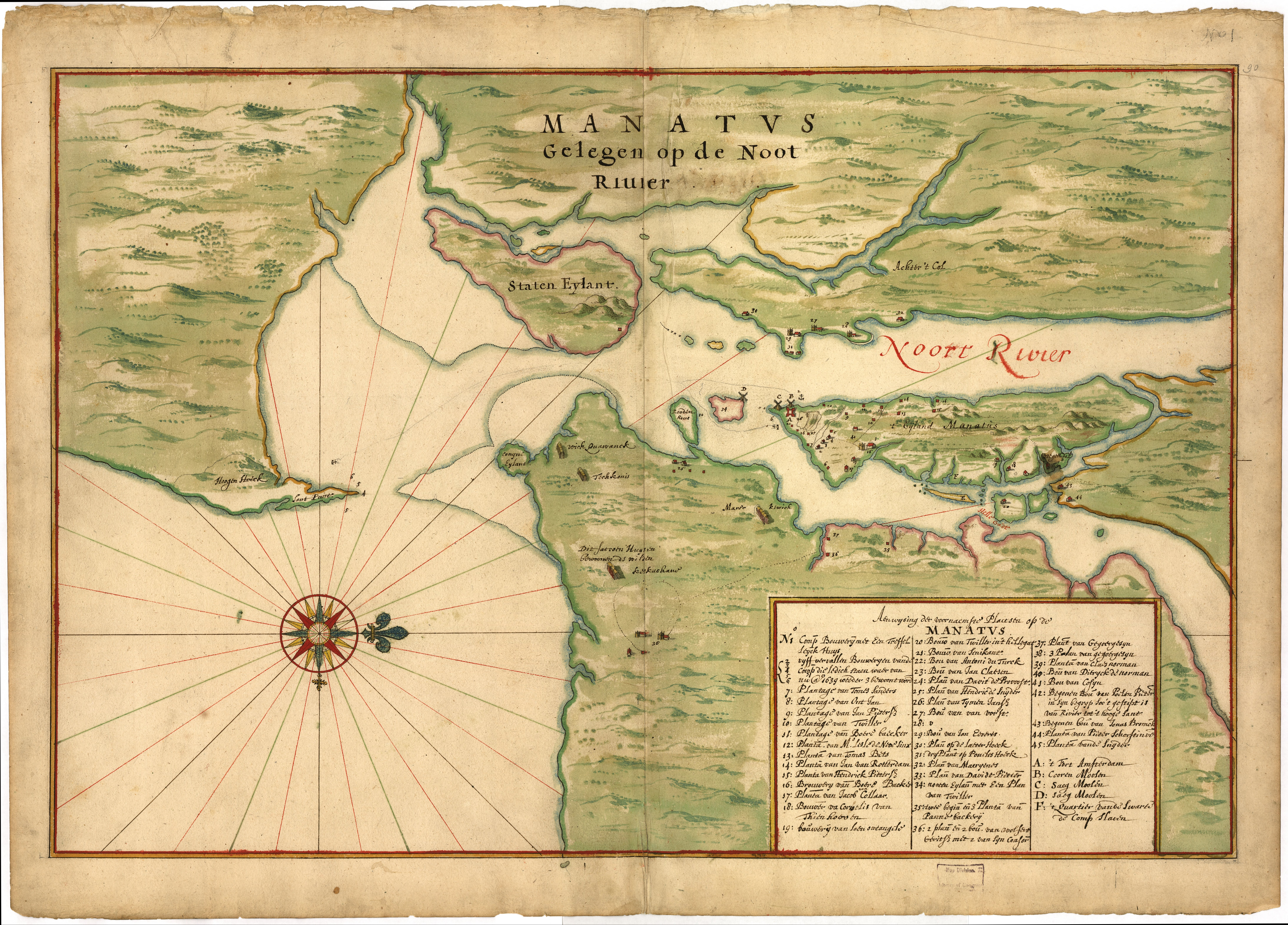
Dutch map (c. 1639) showing Manhattan and the surrounding area. (North is right on this map)

Alberti acclimated well in New Amsterdam's cosmopolitan environment. In 1642, he married a Walloon woman named Judith Manje (also spelled Magnee) in the Dutch Reformed Church. The couple had seven children from 1642 to 1655, including one who died in infancy. The Albertis lived in a home on Broad Street until 1646 when Pietro applied for a land grant from the Dutch. The Albertis farmed 100 acres in Brooklyn until Pietro and Judith were killed in an Indian raid in 1655.

== Legacy ==
Alberti was the first of millions of Italian Americans who would later form part of American culture. A small stone in New York City's Battery Park, near the bronze statue of Giovanni da Verrazzano, commemorates Pietro Alberti's arrival and declares 2 June to be "Alberti Day".

Over the centuries, the family name Alberti had variations in spelling like Albertis, Alburtus, Alburtis and Burtis. Indeed, nearly every American bearing the surnames Burtis and Alburtis can trace their ancestry back to Pietro Cesare Alberti.
