= Giovanni Martino =

American soldier (1852-1922)

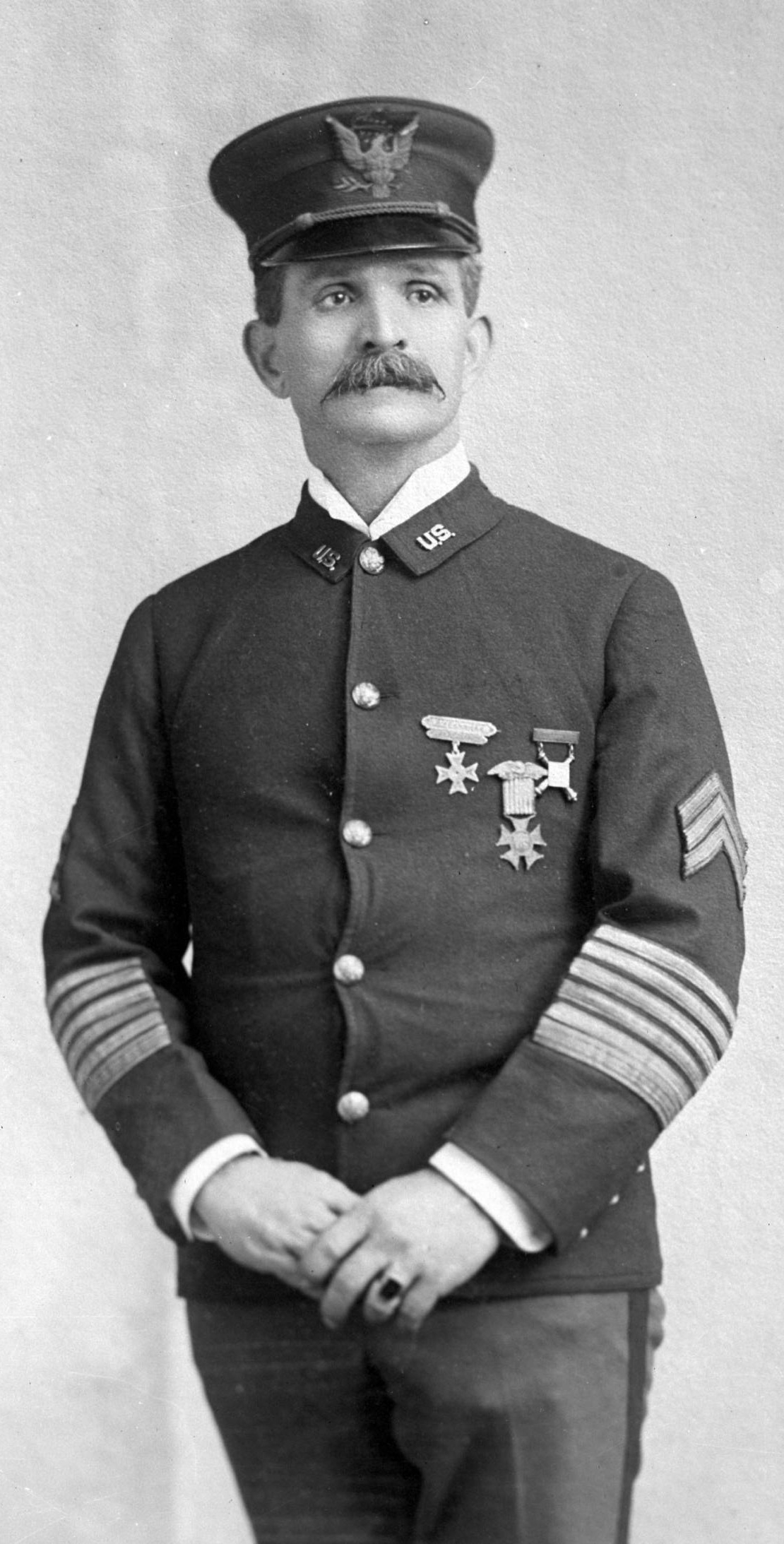
John Martin wearing the US Army uniform, c. 1904

Giovanni Martino or Giovanni Martini, also known as John Martin (1852 – 24 December 1922) was an Italian-American soldier and trumpeter. He served both in Italy with Giuseppe Garibaldi and in the United States Army, famously in the 7th Cavalry Regiment under George Armstrong Custer, where he became known as the only survivor from Custer's company at the Battle of the Little Bighorn.

== Biography ==
Although details of Martino's origin and birth were ambiguous in the years following the Little Bighorn, more recent research conducted by Italian researchers has provided more definitive proof of his origins, as evidenced by the comune (or town) of Sala Consilina's municipal records. Martino was born in the period between late November 1851 and early January 1852 in or around Sala Consilina, Province of Salerno, Campania, Kingdom of the Two Sicilies, but was subsequently left at one of the town's Proietto Domiciliata (orphanages). Within a day of his abandonment on January 28, 1852, he was provided a name (Giovanni Crisostomo Martino), baptized and placed into the home of a local wet nurse.

The unreliability of parish records – as opposed to municipal birth and death registers – inspired two Italian municipalities to claim Martino as one of their own: Apricale, Province of Imperia, and Sala Consilina, Province of Salerno. New evidence appears to substantiate the latter. Although Martino himself, in an interview in 1922 a few months before his death, claimed to have been born in Rome in 1851, Martino's advanced age – as observed and noted by the interviewer, Colonel William Graham – contributed to this apparent self-contradiction.

According to Martino's diary, as recorded during a 1906 interview, he joined the Corpo Volontari Italiani in 1866, led by Italian patriot Giuseppe Garibaldi, as a drummer boy for several years before eventually returning to Sala Consilina, where municipal records indicate a reconciliation occurred between Martino and his biological father. By 1873, Martino boarded a ship in Naples bound for the United States, and upon landing at Castle Clinton was registered as Giovanni Martino, a 21-year-old laborer from Sala. His true name, prior to its anglicization, was confirmed as Giovanni Martino during his registration, effectively dispelling the widespread belief in later years that he was Giovanni Martini. One year later, facing limited employment options, Martino enlisted with the United States Army under the Anglicized name "John Martin", and was assigned to Jefferson Barracks in Missouri to begin training as a cavalry trooper and bugler before his permanent assignment to the U.S. Seventh Cavalry Regiment, led by Lieutenant Colonel George Armstrong Custer.

In 1876, Martino was attached to the 7th Cavalry's Company H, but on the morning of June 25, he was temporarily assigned to serve as one of Custer's bugler-orderlies. As Custer and nearly 210 troopers and scouts began their final approach to the massive Indian village located in the Little Bighorn River valley, Martino was dispatched with an urgent note for reinforcements and ammunition. Newspaper accounts of the period referred to him as “Custer massacre survivor” and “the last white man to see Custer alive”. Martin and the remaining Seventh Cavalry companies not riding with Custer were trapped on a nearby hill and fought off repeated attacks for 36 hours until their rescue by another U.S. Army column.

In 1879, while serving in an artillery battery at Fort Schuyler (New York), he met and married an Irish girl named Julia Higgins, who would give birth to five surviving children. The first one was named George in memory of G.A. Custer. Martin's last action in combat came during the Spanish–American War (1898–1900). He served in the Army until age limitations forced his retirement in 1904. Martin remained with his family in Baltimore, Maryland, where they lived and operated a sweets and candy store. By 1906, perhaps following one of his daughters, he moved to Brooklyn, New York, and took a job as a ticket agent at the 103rd Street Station of the recently built New York City subway system. As he aged, the long hours and commute of his ticket-taker job forced Martin to take a watchman's job at the nearby Navy Yard in 1915. In 1922, while crossing a Brooklyn street, Martin was injured by a truck and hospitalized. He died from complications on December 24, 1922, and was buried three days later in the Veterans section of the Cypress Hills Cemetery (later Cypress Hills National Cemetery) in Brooklyn, New York.

== References in popular culture ==
Italian comedian David Riondino has staged a drama based on Giovanni Martino's character, entitled Il trombettiere ("The trumpeter").

In the 1991 Western television miniseries Son of the Morning Star based on the book of the same name by Evan S. Connell, Sav Farrow portrayed Martino as "Pvt. Martini".
