= Fort Chécagou =

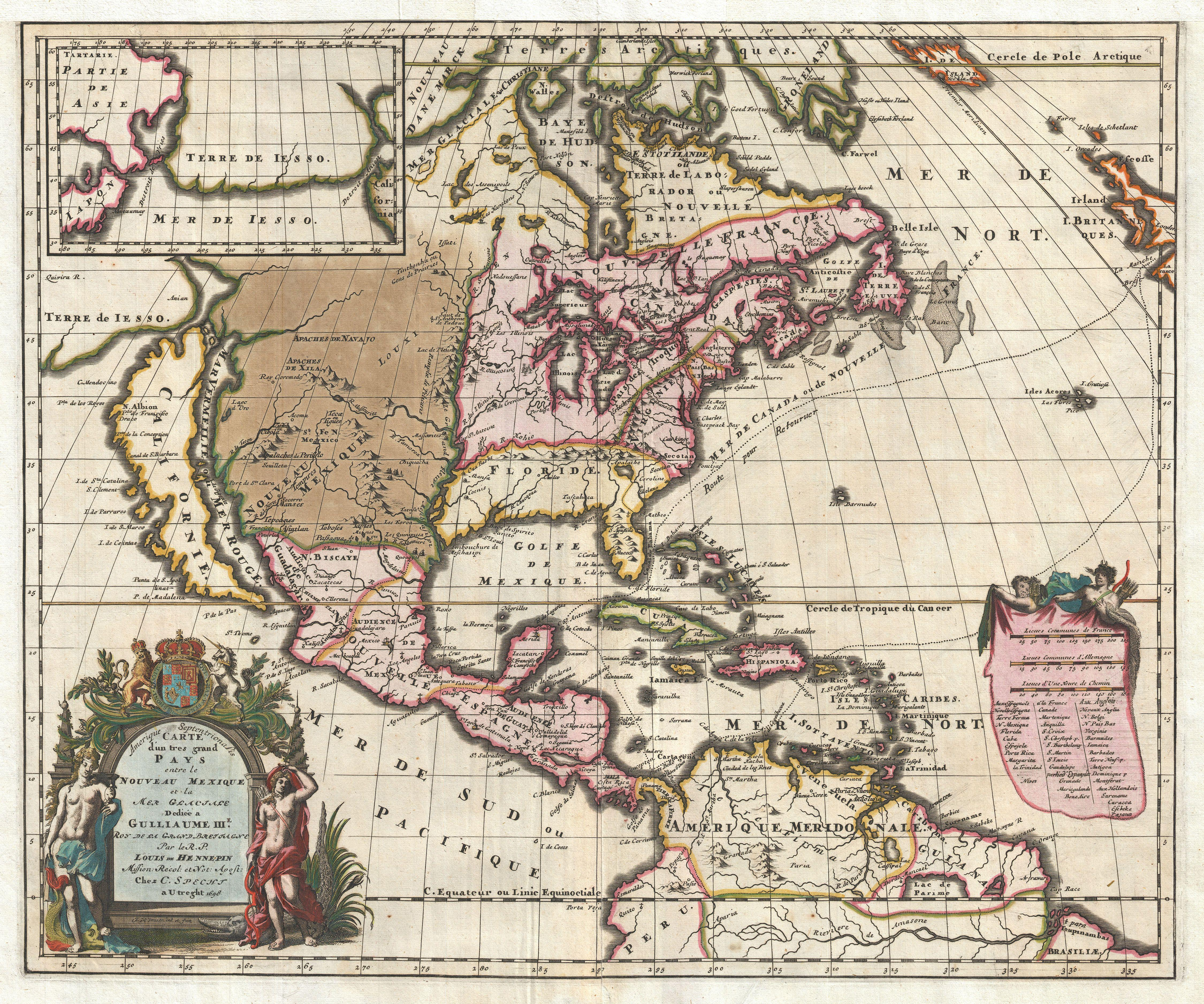
Hennepin's 1698 map showing a river flowing south from Lake Michigan, the purported location of Fort Chécagou

Fort Chécagou, or Fort Chicago, was a purported seventeenth-century fort that may have been located in what is now northeastern Illinois. The name has become associated with a myth that the French continuously maintained a military garrison at a fort near the mouth of the Chicago River, and the future site of the city of Chicago on the southwestern shore of Lake Michigan. Some sources mention that the fort was built in 1685, and that Henri de Tonti sent his aide, Pierre-Charles de Liette, as commander of the fort through 1702. Although this fort was marked on a number of eighteenth century maps of the area, there is no evidence that it ever existed at the described location, but may have instead actually been located at the mouth of the St. Joseph River, on the southeastern shore of Lake Michigan.

== Background ==
Before the arrival of the French missionaries, the swampy area was inhabited by small settlements of Native Americans on the southern coast of Lake Michigan. Their community was made up of Algonquian people of the Mascoutens and Miamis tribes, which hunted the area. The French missionaries were the first Europeans to come into this region. The settlements of Algonquian people in the area were used as trading posts on the trade routes by the French fur traders and trappers. The word Chécagou was probably coined by the French from the native word shikaakwa, which means "wild leek" or "skunk weed".

== History ==
=== Seventeenth century settlement attempts ===
A number of small, temporary fortified trading posts were constructed in the area in the late seventeenth century. The exact location of most of these trading posts is uncertain, and, although they were sometimes referred to as "forts," there is no evidence of a permanent French military fortification in the area during this period.

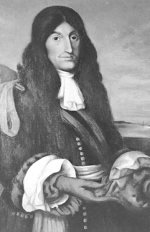
Henri de Tonti

In a letter written by the explorer de LaSalle dated June 4, 1683, he notes that two of his men had constructed a temporary stockade at the Chicago Portage in the winter of 1682. However, this structure was little more than a log cabin and was never garrisoned.

In the winter of 1685, the French had built another temporary stockade in the area, the purported Fort Chécagou. This fort was likely occupied for less than a year. In 1692, Henri de Tonti reportedly sent his aide, Pierre-Charles de Liette, to act as commander of the fort (through 1702). The earliest mention of a Fort of Chicagou located at the mouth of the Chicago River, appears in a memoir written by Henri de Tonti in 1693 in which he recounted an overland journey from Fort Michilimackinac to Fort St. Louis that he made during the winter of 1685/1686:

I embarked, therefore for the Illinois, on St. Andrew's Day [November 30], 1685; but being stopped by the ice, I was obliged to leave my canoe and to proceed on by land. After going 120 leagues, I arrived at the Fort of Chicagou, where M. de la Durantaye commanded; and from thence I came to Fort St. Louis, where I arrived in the middle of January, 1686.

However, an account of the same journey written by Tonty in the summer of 1686, makes no mention of the fort, and can be interpreted to suggest that the fort he visited was actually at the mouth of the St. Joseph River on the southeast side of Lake Michigan. Further evidence that Durantaye's fort was not located beside the Chicago River comes from the journals of Henri Joutel. In October 1687 Joutel, and a party of de LaSalle's men left Fort St. Louis bound for Canada. When they arrived at Lake Michigan, however, poor weather prevented them from going any further. After waiting for eight days by the lake at the mouth of the Chicago River, they gave up and returned to Fort St. Louis. They set out again in March 1688, arriving at Chécagou on March 29, and leaving on April 8. Joutel described their stay in the area, but made no mention of any fort.

The Mission of the Guardian Angel was built in 1696 by the French missionaries in order to facilitate the conversion to Christianity of the local Amerindians.

=== Area abandoned and reclaimed ===
In the early 1700s, the Potawatomis took over this region from the Mascoutens and the Miamis. The area (and any possible forts) was abandoned by the French in the 1720s during the Fox Wars. It was customary for the native peoples to burn down the Europeans' forts after their triumphs, unlike Europeans who would take over the fort and often rename it.

The first known foreigner to permanently settle in the area was Jean Baptiste Point du Sable, who was a Haitian of African and French ancestry. In the 1770s, he settled on the banks of the Chicago River, and married a Potawatomi woman.

== Myth of a French Fort Chécagou is born ==
The myth of a French fort at the mouth of the Chicago River emerged following the publication of a map of Lake Michigan by Louis Hennepin in 1698 (see map, above). His map showed Fort Miami near the mouth of the St. Joseph River, however, he showed the river as emerging from the southernmost tip of the lake. Hennepin's map was widely copied, but cartographers—knowing that there was no river at the southern tip of Lake Michigan—erroneously assumed that Hennepin had intended to show the Chicago River, and so it became widely accepted that there had been a French fort at the mouth of the Chicago River.
