= Olivier Morel de La Durantaye =

Officer of New France

Oliver Morel de La Durantaye (17 February 1640 – 28 September 1716) was an Officer of New France. He was born in Notre Dame du Gaure, Nantes, Province of Brittany, France. He served as commandant of Fort Michilimackinac, in what is now Michigan, from 1683 to 1690. In 1684 he traveled to Fort St. Louis to assist Henri de Tonty against the Iroquois, and it is thought that during this journey he constructed a temporary fort that Tonty visited in the winter of 1685/1686, and later referred to as the Fort of Chicagou. He was also among the crew of Jean Léger de LaGrange that took part in the 1704 Battle of Bonavista.
