= Illinois Country =

Historical French colony in what became the Midwestern United States

Coordinates: 40°15′N 90°15′W

Pays des Illinois
- District of New France
- 1675–1769; 1801–1803
- Flag (Note: The Royal Banner of early modern France or "Bourbon Flag" was the most commonly used flag in New France) The lesser coat of arms of France as used by the Government

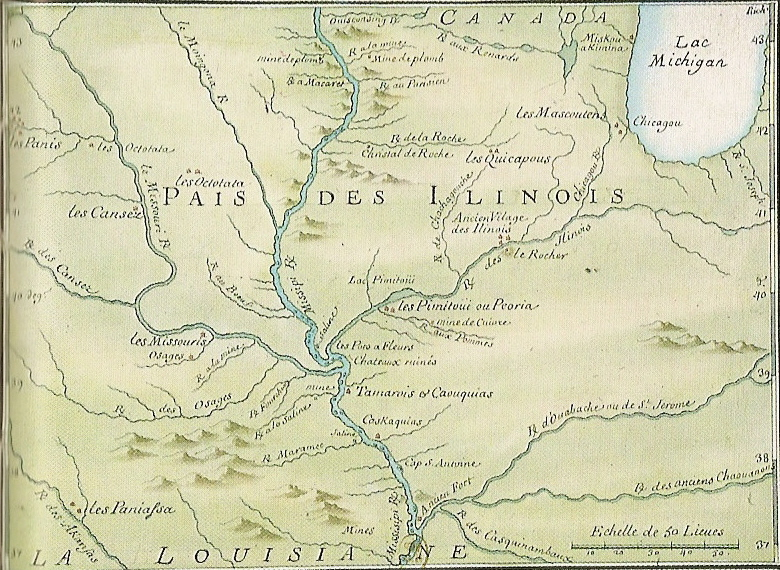
- Illinois Country (Pais des Ilinois (sic)) 1717
- Capital: Montreal (1675–1717); Biloxi (1717–1722); La Nouvelle-Orléans (after 1722) (regional: Chartres–after 1720; St Louis–after 1764)
- History
  - Foundation of the first mission at the Grand Village of the Illinois: 1675
  - Transfer from French Canada to French Louisiana: 1717
  - Split west to Spain (District of Illinois): 1763
  - Split east to Great Britain (Province of Quebec): 1763
  - East ceded to the United States: 1783
  - Spanish retrocession of west to France: 1801
  - West transferred to the United States: 1803
Preceded by
Indigenous Americans
Succeeded by
Louisiana (New Spain)
Province of Quebec (1763–1791)
Illinois County
Louisiana Purchase
- Today part of: United States: Illinois; Indiana; Iowa; Missouri; Ohio

The Illinois Country (French: Pays des Illinois [pɛ.i dez‿i.li.nwa]; lit. 'land of the Illinois people'; Spanish: País de los ilinueses), also referred to as Upper Louisiana (French: Haute-Louisiane [ot.lwi.zjan]; Spanish: Alta Luisiana), was a vast region of New France claimed in the 1600s that later fell under Spanish and British control before becoming what is now part of the Midwestern United States. While the area claimed included the entire Upper Mississippi River watershed, French colonial settlement was concentrated along the Mississippi and Illinois Rivers in what is now the U.S. states of Illinois and Missouri, with outposts on the Wabash River in Indiana. Explored in 1673 from Green Bay to the Arkansas River by the Canadien expedition of Louis Jolliet and Jacques Marquette, the area was claimed by France. It was settled primarily from the Pays d'en Haut in the context of the fur trade, and in the establishment of missions from Canada by French Catholic religious orders. Over time, the fur trade took some French to the far reaches of the Rocky Mountains, especially along the branches of the broad Missouri River valley. The "Illinois" in the territory's name is a reference to the Illinois Confederation, a group of related Algonquian native peoples.

The Illinois Country was governed from the French province of Canada until 1717 when, by order of King Louis XV, it was annexed to the French province of Louisiana, becoming known as "Upper Louisiana". By the mid-18th century, major settlements included Cahokia, Kaskaskia, Chartres, Saint Philippe, and Prairie du Rocher, all on the east side of the Mississippi in present-day Illinois; and Ste. Genevieve across the river in what is now Missouri, as well as Fort Vincennes in what is now Indiana.

As a consequence of the French defeat in the French and Indian War in 1764, the Illinois Country east of the Mississippi River was ceded to the British and became part of the British Province of Quebec; the land west of the river was ceded to Spanish Louisiana.

During the American Revolutionary War, Virginian George Rogers Clark led the Illinois campaign against the British. Illinois Country east of the Mississippi River along with what was then much of Ohio Country became part of Illinois County, Virginia, claimed by right of conquest. The county was abolished in 1782. In 1784, Virginia ceded its claims to the U.S. government and the area was incorporated as part of the Northwest Territory. The name lived on as Illinois Territory between 1809 and 1818, and as the State of Illinois after its admission to the union in 1818. The Spanish-occupied portion of Illinois Country west of the Mississippi was acquired by the United States from France in the Louisiana Purchase of 1803.

== Location and boundaries ==
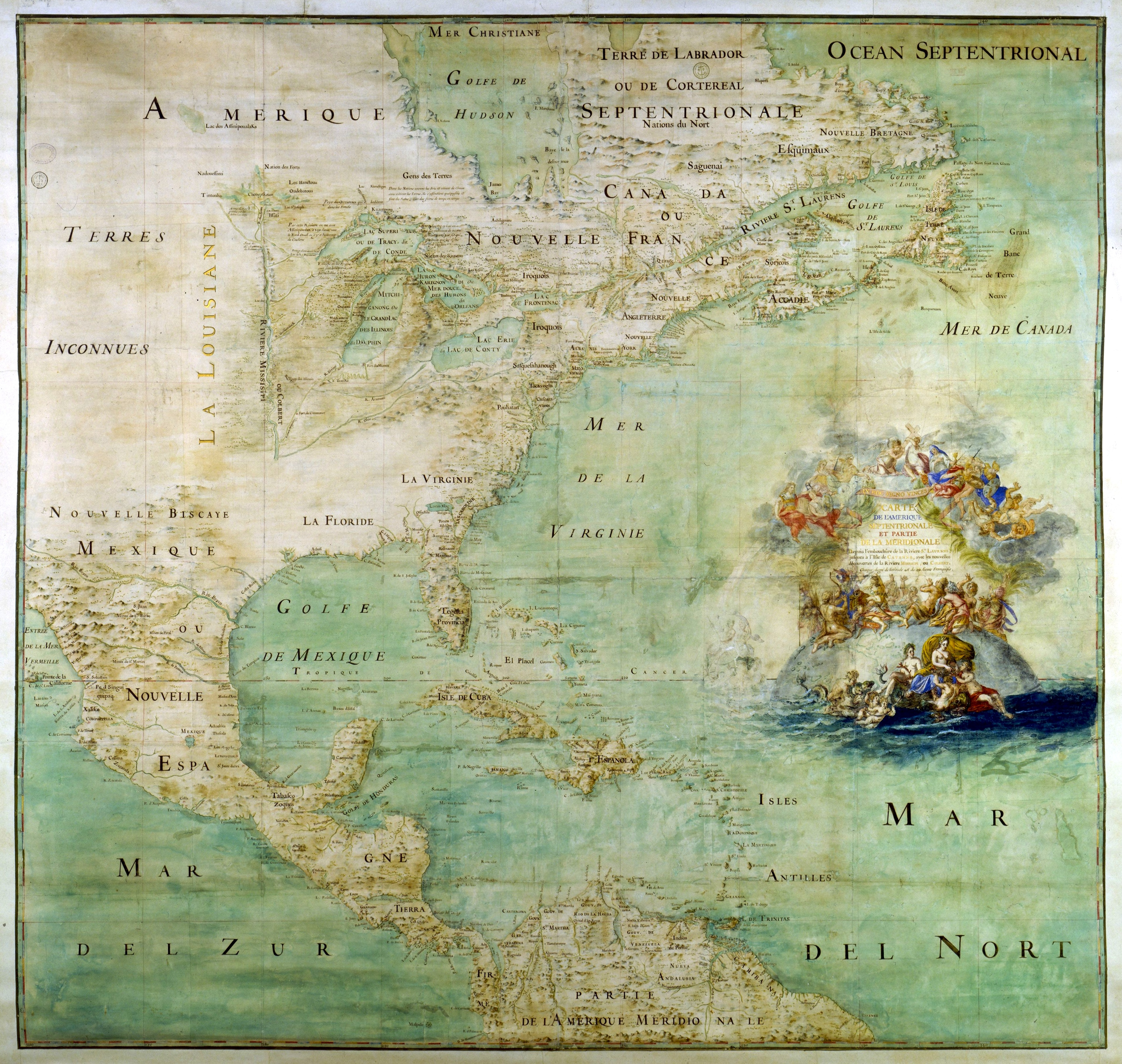
1681 map of the New World: New France and the Great Lakes in the north, with a dark line as the Mississippi River to the west and the mouth of the river (and future New Orleans) then terra incognita. The Pays des Illinois is the area to the southwest of the Great Lakes.

The boundaries of the Illinois Country were defined in a variety of ways, but the region now known as the American Bottom was nearly at the center of all descriptions. One of the earliest known geographic features designated as Ilinois was what later became known as Lake Michigan, on a map prepared in 1671 by French Jesuits. Early French missionaries and traders referred to the area southwest and southeast of the lake, including much of the upper Mississippi Valley, by this name. Illinois was also the name given to an area inhabited by the Illiniwek. A map of 1685 labels a large area southwest of the lake les Ilinois; in 1688, the Italian cartographer Vincenzo Coronelli labeled the region (in Italian) as Illinois country. In 1721, the seventh military district of Louisiana was named Illinois. It included more than half of the present state, as well as the land between the Arkansas River and the line of 43 degrees north latitude, between the Rocky Mountains and the Mississippi River. A royal ordinance of 1722—following the transfer of the Illinois Country's governance from Canada to Louisiana—may have featured the broadest definition of the region, making it coterminous with Upper Louisiana: all land claimed by France south of the Great Lakes and north of the mouth of the Ohio River, including both banks of the Mississippi as well as the lower Missouri Valley. In 1723, the area around the Wabash River became a separate district.

A generation later, trade conflicts between Canada and Louisiana led to a more defined boundary between the French colonies; in 1745, Louisiana governor general Vaudreuil set the northeastern bounds of his domain as the Wabash valley up to the mouth of the Vermilion River (near present-day Danville, Illinois); from there, northwest to le Rocher on the Illinois River, and from there west to the mouth of the Rock River (at present-day Rock Island, Illinois). Thus, Vincennes and Peoria were near the limit of Louisiana's reach; the outposts at Ouiatenon (on the upper Wabash near present-day Lafayette, Indiana), Checagou, Fort Miamis (near present-day Fort Wayne, Indiana) and Prairie du Chien operated as dependencies of Canada.

This boundary between Canada and the Illinois Country remained in effect until the Treaty of Paris in 1763, after which France surrendered its remaining territory east of the Mississippi to Great Britain. (Although British forces had occupied the "Canadian" posts in the Illinois and Wabash countries in 1761, they did not occupy Vincennes or the Mississippi River settlements at Cahokia and Kaskaskia until 1764, after the ratification of the peace treaty.) As part of a general report on conditions in the newly conquered lands, Gen. Thomas Gage, then commandant at Montreal, explained in 1762 that, although the boundary between Louisiana and Canada was not exact, it was understood that the upper Mississippi above the mouth of the Illinois was in Canadian trading territory.

Distinctions became somewhat clearer after the Treaty of Paris in 1763, when Britain acquired Canada and the land claimed by France east of the Mississippi and Spain acquired Louisiana west of the Mississippi. Many French settlers moved west across the river to escape British control. On the west bank, the Spanish also continued to refer to the western region governed from St. Louis as the District of Illinois and referred to St. Louis as the city of Illinois.

== Exploration and settlement ==
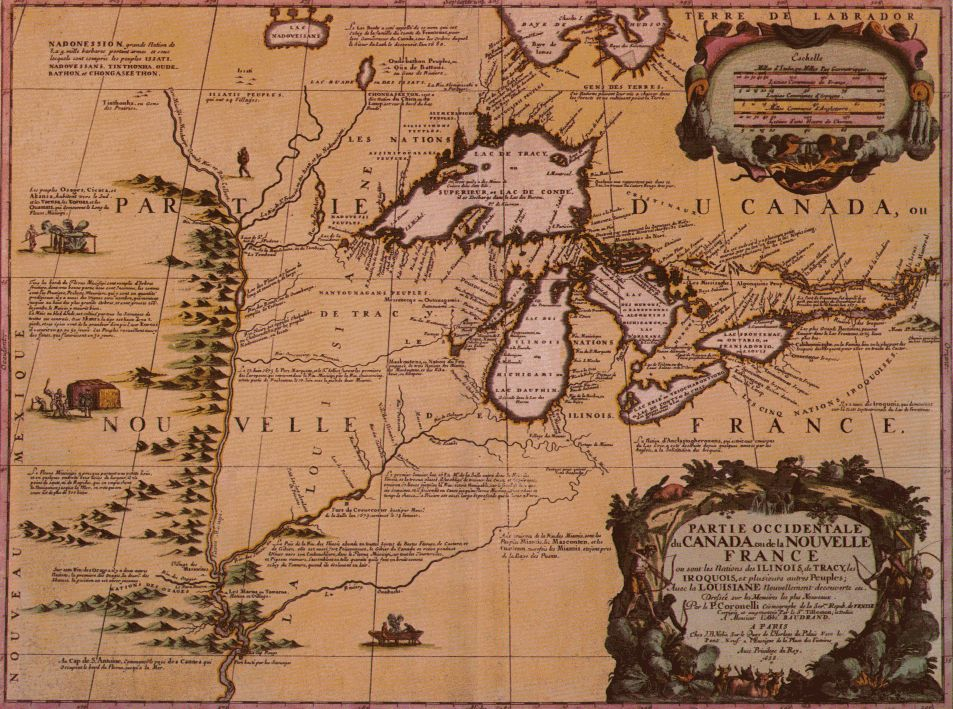
Map of western New France, including the Illinois Country, by Vincenzo Coronelli, 1688

The first French explorations of the Illinois Country were in the first half of the 17th century, led by explorers and missionaries based in Canada. Étienne Brûlé explored the upper Illinois country in 1615 but did not document his experiences. Joseph de La Roche Daillon reached an oil spring at the northeasternmost fringe of the Mississippi River basin during his 1627 missionary journey.

In 1669–70, Father Jacques Marquette, a missionary in French Canada, was at a mission station on Lake Superior, when he met native traders from the Illinois Confederation. He learned about the great river that ran through their country to the south and west. In 1673–74, with a commission from the Canadian government, Marquette and Louis Jolliet explored the Mississippi River territory from Green Bay to the Arkansas River, including the Illinois River valley. In 1675, Marquette returned to found a Jesuit mission at the Grand Village of the Illinois. Over the next decades missions, trade posts, and forts were established in the region. By 1714, the principal European, non-native inhabitants were Canadien fur traders, missionaries and soldiers, dealing with Native Americans, particularly the group known as the Kaskaskia. The main French settlements were established at Kaskaskia, Cahokia, and Sainte Genevieve. By 1752, the population had risen to 2,573.

From the 1710s to the 1730s, the Fox Wars between the French, French allied tribes and the Meskwaki people occurred in what is now northern Illinois, southern Wisconsin, and Michigan, in particular, over the fur trade. During the conflict, in what is now McLean County, Illinois, French and allied forces won a consequential battle against the Meskwaki in 1730.

=== Fort St. Louis du Rocher ===
French explorers led by René-Robert Cavelier, Sieur de La Salle built Fort St. Louis on a large butte by the Illinois River in the winter of 1682. Called Le Rocher, the butte provided an advantageous position for the fort above the river. A wooden palisade was the only form of defenses that La Salle used in securing the site. Inside the fort were a few wooden houses and native shelters. The French intended St. Louis to be the first of several forts to defend against English incursions and keep their settlements confined to the East Coast. Accompanying the French to the region were allied members of several native tribes from eastern areas, who integrated with the Kaskaskia: the Miami, Shawnee, and Mahican. The tribes established a new settlement at the base of the butte known as Hotel Plaza. After La Salle's five-year monopoly ended New France governor Joseph-Antoine de La Barre wished to put Fort Saint Louis along with Fort Frontenac under his jurisdiction. By orders of the governor, traders and his officer were escorted to Illinois. On August 11, 1683, LaSalle's armorer, Pierre Prudhomme, obtained approximately one and three-quarters of a mile of the north portage shore.

During the earliest of the French and Indian Wars, the French used the fort as a refuge against attacks by Iroquois, who were allied with the British. The Iroquois forced the settlers, then commanded by Henri de Tonti, to abandon the fort in 1691. De Tonti reorganized the settlers at Fort Pimitoui in modern-day Peoria.

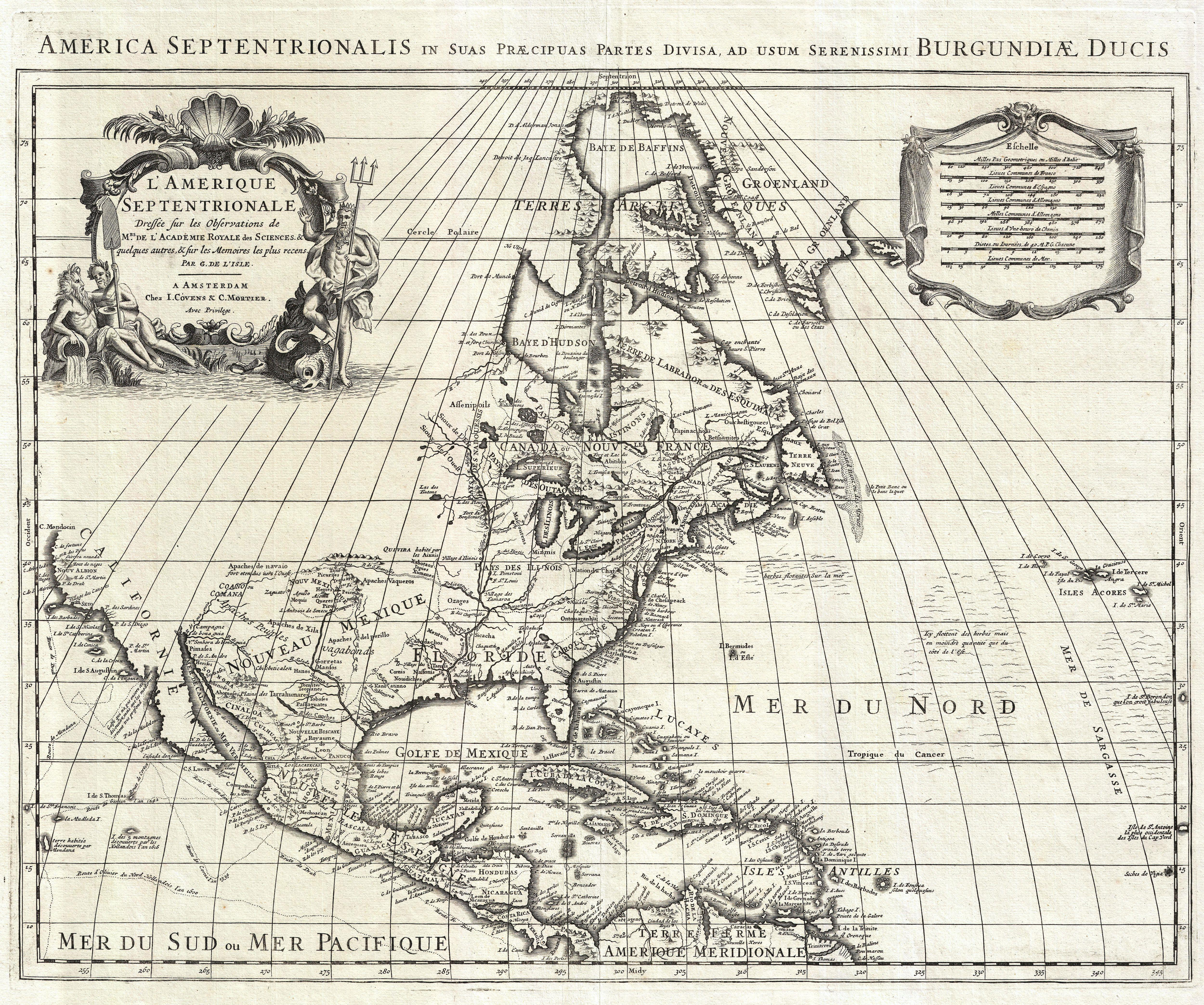
French Map of North America 1700 (Covens and Mortier ed. 1708) − "PAYS DES ILINOIS", near center

French troops commanded by Pierre-Charles de Liette occupied Fort St. Louis from 1714 to 1718; De Liette's jurisdiction over the region ended when the territory was transferred from Canada to Louisiana. Fur trappers and traders used the fort periodically in the early 18th century until it became too dilapidated. No surface remains of the fort are found at the site today. The region was periodically occupied by a variety of native tribes who were forced westward by the expansion of European settlements. These included the Potawatomi, Ottawa, and Ojibwe.

On April 20, 1769, an Illinois Confederation warrior assassinated Chief Pontiac while he was on a diplomatic mission in Cahokia. According to local legend, the Ottawa, along with their allies the Potawatomi, attacked a band of Illini along the Illinois River. The tribe climbed to the butte to seek refuge from the attack. The Ottawa and Potawatomi continued the siege until the Illini tribe starved to death. After hearing the story, Europeans referred to the butte as Starved Rock.

=== Fort de Chartres ===
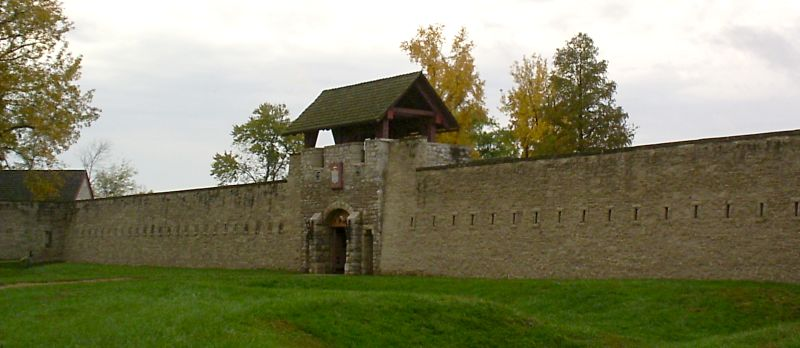
Reconstructed curtain and gatehouse of Fort de Chartres

On January 1, 1718, a trade monopoly was granted to John Law's Company. Hoping to make a fortune mining precious metals in the area, the company with a military contingent sent from New Orleans built a fort to protect its interests. Construction began on the first Fort de Chartres (in present-day Illinois) in 1718 and was completed in 1720.

The original fort was located on the east bank of the Mississippi River, downriver (south) from Cahokia and upriver of Kaskaskia. The nearby settlement of Prairie du Rocher, Illinois, was founded by French-Canadian colonists in 1722, a few miles inland from the fort.

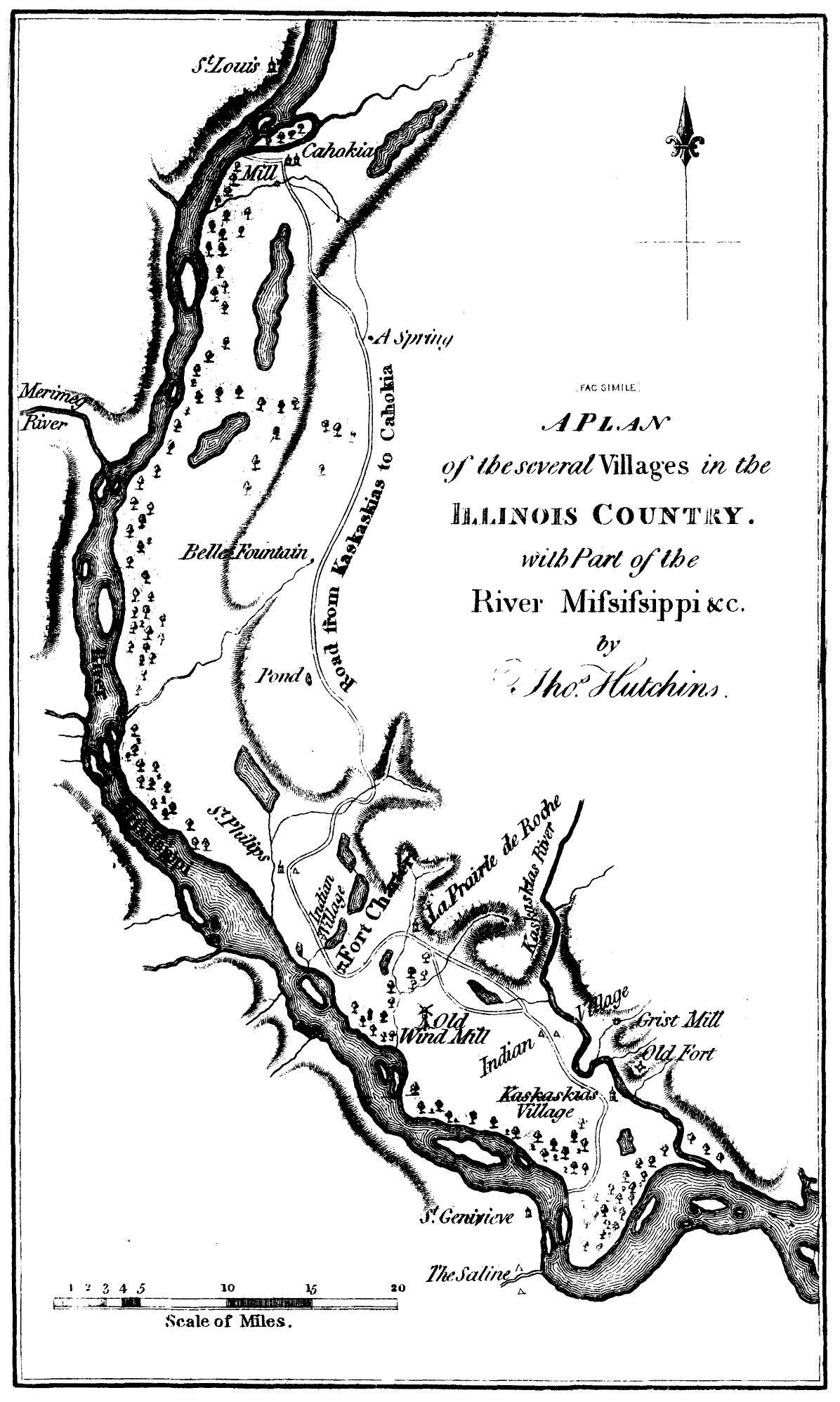
Thomas Hutchins map of settlements in the Illinois Country in 1778

The fort was to be the seat of government for the Illinois Country and help to control the aggressive Meskwaki. The fort was named after Louis, duc de Chartres, son of the regent of France. Because of frequent flooding, another fort was built further inland in 1725. By 1731, the Company of the Indies had gone defunct and turned Louisiana and its government back to the king. The garrison at the fort was removed to Kaskaskia, Illinois in 1747, about 18 miles to the south. A new stone fort was planned near the old fort and was described as "nearly complete" in 1754, although construction continued until 1760.

The new stone fort was headquarters for the French Illinois Country for less than 20 years, as it was turned over to the British in 1763 with the Treaty of Paris at the end of the French and Indian War. The British Crown declared almost all the land between the Appalachian Mountains and the Mississippi River from Florida to Newfoundland a Native American territory called the Indian Reserve following the Royal Proclamation of 1763. The government ordered settlers to leave or get a special license to remain. This and the desire to live in a Catholic territory caused many of the Canadiens to cross the Mississippi to live in St. Louis or Ste. Genevieve. The British soon relaxed their policy and later extended the Province of Quebec to the region.

The British took control of Fort de Chartres on October 10, 1765, and renamed it Fort Cavendish. The British softened the initial expulsion order and offered the Canadien inhabitants the same rights and privileges enjoyed under French rule. In September 1768, the British established a Court of Justice, the first court of common law in the Mississippi Valley (the French law system is called civil law).

After severe flooding in 1772, the British saw little value in maintaining the fort and abandoned it. They moved the military garrison to the fort at Kaskaskia and renamed it Fort Gage. Chartres' ruined but intact magazine is considered the oldest surviving European structure in Illinois and was reconstructed in the 20th century, with much of the rest of the Fort.

=== Agricultural settlement and slavery ===
According to historian Carl J. Ekberg, the French settlement pattern in Illinois Country was generally unique in 17th- and 18th-century French North America. These were unlike other such French settlements, which primarily had been organized in separated homesteads along a river with long rectangular plots stretching back from the river (ribbon plots). The Illinois Country French, although they marked long-ribbon plots, did not reside on them. Instead, settlers resided together in farming villages, more like the farming villages of northern France, and practiced communal agriculture.

After the port of New Orleans, along the Mississippi River to the south, was founded in 1718, more African slaves were imported to the Illinois Country for use as agricultural and mining laborers. By the mid-eighteenth century, slaves accounted for as much as a third of the population.

=== Other settlements ===
- In 1675, Jacques Marquette founded the mission of the Immaculate Conception of the Blessed Virgin at the Grand Village of the Illinois, near present-day Utica, Illinois, which was destroyed by Iroquois in 1680.

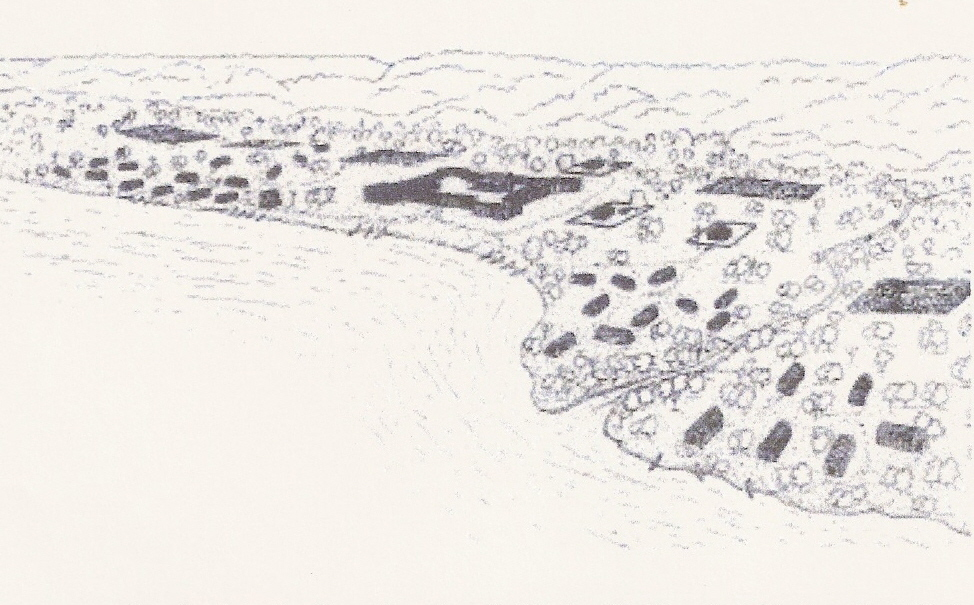
Fort Pimiteoui (Old Peoria) circa 1702

- Peoria was at first the southernmost part of New France, then the northernmost part of the French Colony of Louisiana, and finally the westernmost part of the newly formed United States. Fort Crevecoeur was first founded in 1680. Another fort, often called Fort Pimiteoui, and later Old Fort Peoria, was established in 1691. French interests dominated at Peoria for well over a hundred years, from the time the first French explorers came up the Illinois River in 1673 until the first United States settlers began to move into the area around 1815. A small French presence persisted for a time on the east bank of the river, but was gone by about 1846. Today, only faint echoes of French Peoria survive in the street plan of downtown Peoria, and in the name of an occasional street, school, or hotel meeting room: Joliet, Marquette, LaSalle.
- The Mission of the Guardian Angel was established near the Chicago portage between 1696 and 1700.

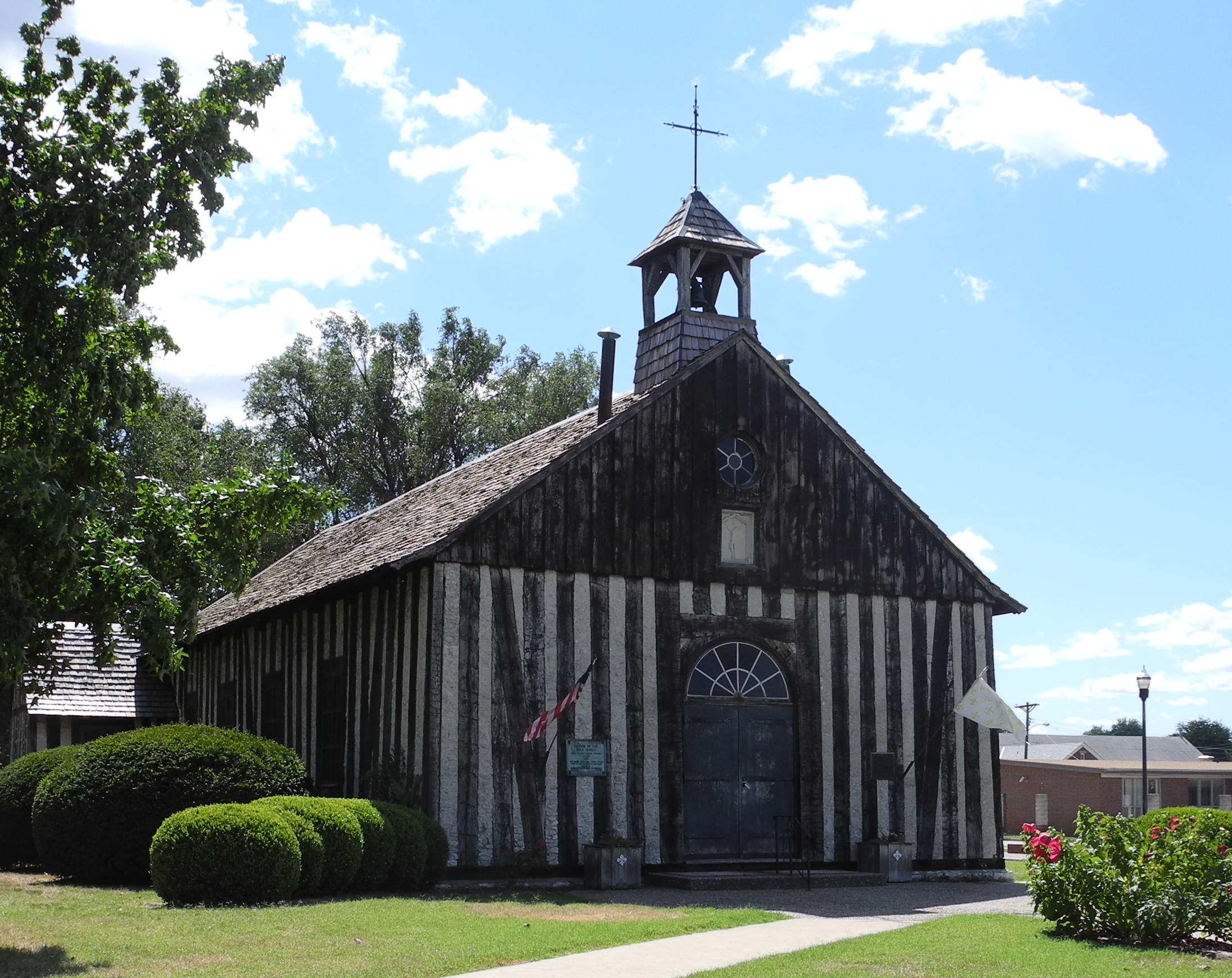
French Church of the Holy Family in Cahokia

- Cahokia, established in 1696 by French missionaries from Quebec, was one of the earliest permanent settlements in the region. It became one of the most populous of the northern towns. In 1787, it was made the seat of St. Clair County in the Northwest Territory. In 1801, William Henry Harrison, then governor of Indiana Territory, enlarged St. Clair County to administer a vast area extending to the Canada–US border. By 1814, the county had been reduced to almost the size of present-day St. Clair County, Illinois. The county seat was shifted from Cahokia to Belleville. On April 20, 1769, the great Indian leader Chief Pontiac was murdered in Cahokia by a chief of the Peoria.
- Kaskaskia, established in 1703, was at first small mission station for the French. It flourished to become capital of the Illinois Territory, 1809–1818, and the first capital of the state of Illinois, 1818−1820. The French built a fort here in 1721, which was destroyed in 1763 by the British. (The fort was situated above what was then the lower course of the Kaskaskia River, but became the new channel of the Mississippi in 1881.) During the American Revolutionary War, General George Rogers Clark took possession of the village in 1778. The residents rang the church bell in celebration, and it became known as the "liberty bell". (It had been sent in 1741 by King Louis XV.) Flooding and a lateral shift of the river channel in 1881 cut off the old settlement from the mainland of Illinois and destroyed some of the village and its archaeology. Much of the village cemetery was transferred to the higher ground of Fort Kaskaskia State Park across the river. Today visitors can reach the remnants of Kaskaskia only by a bridge and road from the Missouri side. In the Great Flood of 1993, the Mississippi submerged all but a few rooftops and the steeple of the Catholic Church of the Immaculate Conception, built in 1843 and moved brick by brick to the new location on Kaskaskia Island about 1893.
- In 1720, Philip Francois Renault, the Director of Mining Operations for the Company of the West, arrived with about 200 laborers and mechanics and 500 African slaves from Saint-Domingue to work the mines. However, the mines yielded only unprofitable coal and lead, providing insufficient revenues for the Company of the West to survive. In 1723, Renault, with his workers and slaves, established the village of St. Philippe (on the Bottoms down from the present-day unincorporated community of Renault, Illinois in Monroe County, Illinois.) It was about 3 miles north of Fort de Chartres. This is the first record of African slaves in the region. Some of the French farmers also used slaves for labor, but most families held only a few, if any. The village quickly produced an agricultural surplus, with its goods sold to lower Louisiana, as well as to settlements less successful than those in the Illinois Country, such as Arkansas Post.
- As early as 1733, a trading post was established by Jean Baptiste de Girardot at Cape Girardeau and the town later formed in 1793.
- The original Ste. Genevieve was established around 1750 along the western banks of the Mississippi River. The village consisted of mostly farmers and merchants of French-Canadian descent from the settlements on the east side. Despite flooding, the town remained in that location until the great flood of 1785 destroyed much property. The villagers decided to move the entire village to higher ground about two miles north and half a mile back from the river floodplain. The city has retained the most buildings of French Colonial architecture in the US.
- The French established Fort Orleans in 1723 along the Missouri River near Brunswick, Missouri.
- Fort Vincennes, on the Wabash River, later known as St. Vincennes and eventually Vincennes, Indiana, was established in 1732. The British renamed it Fort Sackville after their capture of it in the French and Indian War (also known as the Seven Years' War.) George Rogers Clark renamed it Fort Patrick Henry, for the Governor of Virginia, when he took it in the American Revolution. Although part of the original expansive Illinois Country, as part of the Northwest Territory, it became the seat of a separate county.
- The French built Fort de L'Ascension (later, de Massiac) on the Ohio River in 1757 near present-day Metropolis, Illinois.
- St. Louis was founded in 1764 by French fur traders. In 1765, it was made the capital of Upper Louisiana; and after 1767, control of the region west of the Mississippi was given to the Spanish ("District of Illinois"). In 1780, St. Louis was attacked by British forces, mostly Native Americans, during the American Revolutionary War.

== British province of Quebec ==
Following the British occupation of the east bank of the Mississippi in 1765, some Canadien settlers remained in the area, while others crossed the river, forming new settlements such as St. Louis. The British faced an uprising of Native Americans known as Pontiac's War. Longtime allies of the French, the Kaskaskia and Peoria tribes had resisted the British, and Pontiac led a coalition of the Illini, and Kickapoo, Miami, Ojibway, Ottawa, Potawatomi, Seneca, Wea, and Wyandot against the British. Pursuant to the Treaty of Paris (1763) Captain Thomas Sterling and the 42nd Regiment of Foot took command of Fort de Chartres, from the French commandant, Captain Louis St. Ange de Bellerive in 1765.

== Illinois Country under American control ==
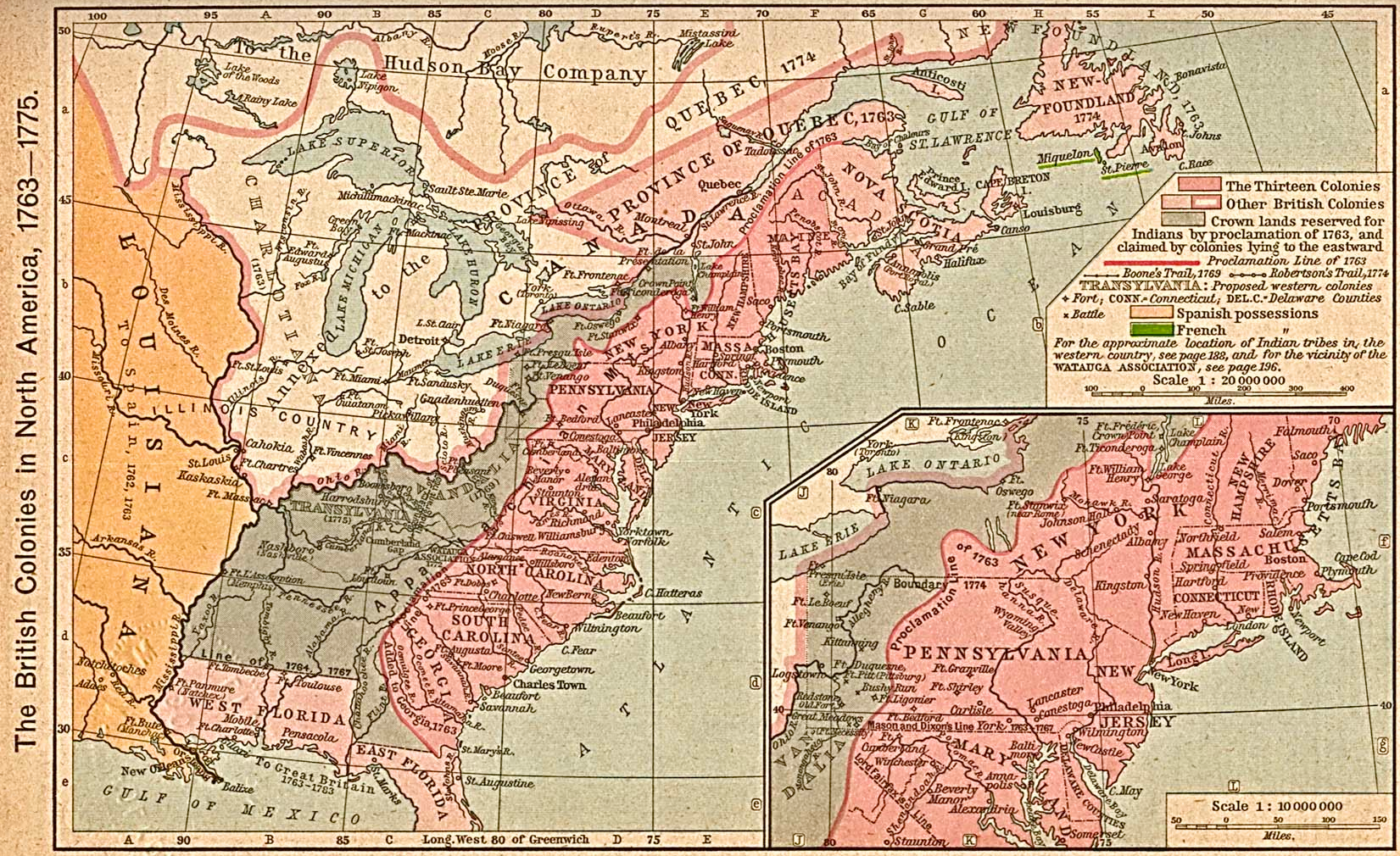
Map of British America's Province of Quebec and the trans-Mississippi River, Illinois Country (center-left) under the Quebec Act of 1774, divided with Spanish Luisiana

During the Revolutionary War, General George Rogers Clark took possession of the part of the Illinois Country east of the Mississippi for Virginia. In November 1778, the Virginia legislature created the county of Illinois, comprising all of the lands lying west of the Ohio River to which Virginia had any claim, with Kaskaskia as the county seat. Captain John Todd was named as governor. However, this government was limited to the former Canadien settlements and was rather ineffective.

For their assistance to General Clark in the war, settled Canadien and Indian residents of Illinois Country were given full citizenship. Under the Northwest Ordinance and many subsequent treaties and acts of Congress, the Canadien and Indian residents of Vincennes and Kaskaskia were granted specific exemptions, as they had declared themselves citizens of Virginia. The term Illinois Country was sometimes used in legislation to refer to these settlements.

Much of the Illinois Country region became an organized territory of the United States with the establishment of the Northwest Territory in 1787. In 1803, the old Illinois Country area west of the Mississippi was gained by the U.S. in the Louisiana Purchase.

== See also ==
- French Colonial Historic District
- List of commandants of the Illinois Country
- Missouri French, a dialect of French spoken in the Midwestern Mississippi River Valley
- Ohio Country
- Slavery in New France

== Bibliography ==
- Alvord, Clarence Walworth. The Illinois Country, 1673–1818 (1920) online
- Belting, Natalia Maree, Kaskaskia under the French Regime (1948) online
- Brackenridge, Henri Marie, Recollections of Persons and Places in the West (Google Books)
- Ekberg, Carl J., Stealing Indian Women: Native Slavery in the Illinois Country, Urbana, IL: University of Illinois Press, 2007.
- Ekberg, Carl J., Francois Vallé and His World: Upper Louisiana Before Lewis and Clark, Columbia, MO: University of Missouri Press, 2002.
- Ekberg, Carl J., French Roots in the Illinois Country: The Mississippi Frontier in Colonial Times, Urbana, IL: University of Illinois Press, 2000, ISBN 0-252-06924-2
- Ekberg, Carl J., Colonial Ste. Genevieve: An Adventure on the Mississippi Frontier, Tucson, AZ: Patrice Press, 1996, ISBN 1-880397-14-5
- Lippincott, Isaac. "Industry among the French in the Illinois country." Journal of Political Economy 18.2 (1910): 114−128. online Archived August 16, 2021, at the Wayback Machine
