= Pierre-Charles de Liette =

Italian colonial administrator in French North America

6th Commandant of the Illinois Country
- In office 1702–1718
- Preceded by: François Dauphin de la Forest
- Succeeded by: Pierre Dugué de Boisbriand

Personal details
- Born: PierCarlo Di Lietto c. 1672 Gaeta (southern Italy)
- Died: May 1729
- Profession: Soldier and governor

Pierre-Charles de Liette (born PierCarlo Di Lietto) was an Italian who moved to French North America and enrolled there as a French soldier. He served as an aide to Henri de Tonti, as commandant at Fort Saint-Louis and Chécagou, and as a captain in the colonial regular troops from 1687 to 1729. He was also Commandant of the Illinois Country from 1702 to 1718.

== Biography ==
Pierre De Liette was born probably in Gaeta (southern Italy) with the name Piero Carlo Di Lietto, around 1672. He moved to New France around 1685 and lived in Quebec for some time. There he changed his name in a more adapted French version: De Liette or Desliette.

Di Lietto served 15 years under Henri de Tonti (who was his cousin), which began with his arrival at Fort Saint-Louis at Le Rocher (Starved Rock) in 1687. Initially the young De Liette lived with the Illinois and Miami tribes hunting, trading and learning their language and customs. After three years, satisfied with the progress of his cousin, Tonti entrusted him with the command of Fort Saint-Louis.

Later he appointed him to supervise the resettlement of the Illinois. During the French and Indian Wars, the French used the Fort Saint Louis as a refuge against attacks by Iroquois, who were allied with the British. But in 1692, the fort was evacuated after being attacked by the Iroqouis.

The Illinois village and the garrison were moved to a new location at Fort Pimitoui (now Peoria). De Liette then served as interim commandant at Fort Chécagou, where Tonti maintained a warehouse (and also at Fort Pimiteoui until 1702). Indeed, the Fort Chécagou (or Fort Chicago) was built in 1685 by Henri de Tonti and later Pierre-Charles de Liette was the main commander of the fort through 1702, probably creating the first civil settlements in the area of what is now Chicago.

During one of his visits to Montreal de Liette wrote the "De Gannes Memoir," preserved in the Ayer Collection, Newberry, Library, Chicago. Although someone named De Gannes signed the memoir, internal evidence alone proves de Liette's authorship. Almost 50 printed pages in length, this document is a valuable account of the Illinois and Miami Indians, and of the country in which they lived.

— C.J.Russ

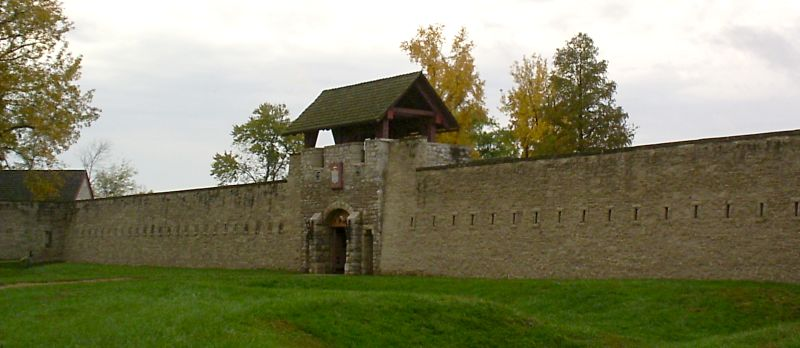
Fort de Chartres, commanded by De Liette in 1725

From 1702 until 1711 De Liette remained the only representative of the French government among the Indians in the area, mainly because of his knowledge of their language. He was in charge of mediation between the Miami and Illinois tribes and was successful even with countering the English trade ventures in the area. De Liette fought bravely the Fox tribe and in 1725 was named Commandant of the "Illinois country" while in charge of the Fort de Chartres.

Pierre-Charles de Liette died in May 1729, after having spent most of his adult life in the West. He explored the Mississippi valley in detail, while in close contact with the Illinois tribe (of which he described the social patterns in some documents).

== See also ==
- Henry de Tonti
- Illinois country
- New France
- Fort Chicago
- Fort de Chartres

== Bibliography ==
- Delanglez, Jean.The voyages of Tonti in North America 1678–1704. Mid-America, XXVI (1944; new ser.: XV), p. 255–300
- MacDonald, David. Lives of Fort de Chartres: Commandants, Soldiers, and Civilians in French Illinois, 1720–1770. Shawnee Books; SIU Press. Chicago, 2016 ISBN 0809334615
