= Jacques Baudry de Lamarche =

Jacques Baudry de Lamarche (baptized 13 September 1676 – ca. 1738) was the son of a Canadian craftsman from Trois-Rivières who moved to France at some point in his youth.

There is little information about Jacques Baudry de Lamarche. He returned to North America in April of 1723 and acquired the rights to certain properties in Detroit. These were in the name of Antoine Laumet de La Mothe, sieur de Cadillac and consisted of several buildings and various other land. An attorney, Étienne Véron de Grandmesnil, from Trois-Rivières took the appointment to carry out the legalities of this extensive acquisition. Opposing major aspects of the transaction were Philippe de Rigaud Vaudreuil and Alphonse de Tonty.

In 1738, Baudry's name appears in New France in connection with a position as brigadier general and special attorney for the Frères Hospitaliers de la Croix, a charitable order in Montreal.
