= Alphonse de Tonty =

Italian-French explorer in North America (c. 1659–1727)

Pierre Alphonse de Tonty, Alfonso de Tonti, or Alphonse de Tonty, Baron de Paludy (c. 1659 – 10 November 1727) served as Captain and second in command to French explorer Cadillac when the expedition established the first European settlement at Detroit, Michigan, Fort Pontchartrain du Detroit on the Detroit River in 1701. Several months later, both Cadillac and Tonty brought their wives to the fort, making them the first European women to travel so deep into the new territory.

He was born in Paris, ca. 1659, to Lorenzo de Tonti who was a financier and former governor of Gaeta who was in France in exile. Lorenzo de Tonti was the inventor of the form of life insurance known as the tontine. Henri de Tonti, involved in LaSalle's exploration of the Mississippi River and the establishment of the first settlement in Arkansas, was his older brother.

Tonty was commanding the fort in Detroit by 1717, but by 1727 numerous complaints, including those by the Huron led to his dismissal.

Tonty was involved in numerous scandals and disreputable activities before he was eventually dismissed from his post as commandant of Fort Pontchartrain. He died before he could obtain another appointment or return to France.

Tonty was married twice. His first marriage in 1689 was to Marie Anne Picoté de Belestre with whom he had 13 children. She was the daughter of Pierre Picoté de Belestre.

== See also ==
- Jacques Baudry de Lamarche
- Antoine de la Mothe Cadillac
