= Lorenzo de Tonti =

Italian banker (c. 1602 – c. 1684)

Lorenzo de Tonti (c. 1602 – c. 1684) was a governor of Gaeta, Italy and a Neapolitan banker. He is sometimes credited with the invention of the tontine, a form of pension, although it has also been suggested that he simply modified existing procedures.

Around 1650, his wife, Isabelle di Lietto, gave birth to their first son, the future explorer Henri de Tonti. Shortly afterwards, Tonti was involved in a revolt against a Spanish viceroy in Naples and had to seek political asylum in France. Their second son, Alphonse de Tonty, was born in Paris and later helped establish Detroit, Michigan.

For reasons unknown, Louis XIV had him imprisoned in the Bastille from 1668 to 1675. Around 1684, he died in obscurity of unknown causes.
