= Battle of Bonavista =

1704 naval battle

- Part of Queen Anne's War
Date	18 August 1704
Location	Bonavista Harbour, Newfoundland Colony
Result	French destruction of the Society and William and the capture of the Pembroke Galley. Successful English defense of Bonavista.

Belligerents
France: New France Abenaki	(England) English: (England) Newfoundland Militia

Commanders and leaders
(New France) Jean Léger de LaGrange (New France) Claude Pauperet	(England) Michael Gill

Strength
2 ships 144 men	4 ships 102 men

Casualties and losses
several killed and wounded	1 killed 3 wounded

The Battle of Bonavista was a naval battle, between the French and English, that occurred in morning hours of 29 August 1704, outside the settlement of Bonavista, Newfoundland Colony, that lasted 6 hours.

== History ==
=== Background ===
Near the end of 1703, French captain, Jean Léger de LaGrange obtained permission from the Governor General of New France, Philippe de Rigaud, to lead an expedition against the English in Newfoundland, attempting to mimic the victory of the Avalon Peninsula campaign, in which LaGrange served under Pierre Le Moyne d'Iberville.

LaGrange obtained financing from several merchants including Nicholas Dupont, Louis Prat, and Antoine Pascaud. With help from their financing, LaGrange purchased two ships, the Joybert and Philipeau. LaGrange also recruited at least 26 men, free of charge, with the promise of shared plunder. Oliver Morel de La Durantaye and Denis-Joseph Juchereau de La Ferté were known members among his crew. LaGrange also recruited men from the Abenaki tribe, who had also served with him in the Avalon Peninsula campaign. LaGrange took command of the Joybert while French merchant, Claude Pauperet, took command of the Philipeau.

In 1704, LaGrange sailed from New France to Newfoundland.

=== The battle ===
In the early morning hours of 18 August, LaGrange and his two ships sailed into Bonavista Harbour. Here there were several ships at anchor, including the 250 ton Pembroke Galley from London, commanded by John Noll and a ship commanded by Captain Michael Gill; an English mariner from Charlestown, Massachusetts.

Under the cover of night and fog, LaGrange and his men snuck on to two ships, the Society and William, plundering them and later setting them on fire. They also captured the Pembroke Galley, despite her being an armed vessel with 24 guns and 44 cremen; she was laden down with 2500 quintals of dried cod. LaGrange also ordered for the town of Bonavista to be sacked and burnt. LaGrange also took the captains and crew of the Society and William prisoner.

When day had broken and the fog lifted, the ship commanded by Captain Michael Gill and armed with 14 guns and 24 crewmen, emerged from anchor, ready for battle. Gill and LaGrange then engaged and it was said that the battle had lasted 6 hours. Once members of the local militia got word of the battle, they rallied together and joined the battle from the shore. Gill's ship was crippled but he and the militia drove LaGrange and his ships out, successfully defending the town of Bonavista.

LaGrange fled with his two ships and the captured Pembroke Galley and returned to New France. 40 leagues off Bonavista, LaGrange set his prisoners free and gave them a boat; they returned to Newfoundland unharmed.

=== Aftermath ===
The spoils of the battle were divided amongst the crew in Quebec, each crewman received 40 écus. Some of the cod from the Pembroke Galley was also sold in Quebec to lighten the load and prepare for her journey to Europe. The Pembroke Galley was later recaptured by the English somewhere between Bilbao, Spain and La Rochelle, France.

As a reward for his exploits, LaGrange was appointed captain of the flute in the king's navy, a position he held for several years.

Captain Gill was commended by the Flying Post in London for his defense of Bonavista.

== In popular culture ==
- A ballad recounting the story, titled Gill's Fight at Bonavista, was written by George Hoskins of Newfoundland.
- A ballad recounting the story, titled Skipper Michael Gill, 1704, was written by A.J. O'Rielly of Newfoundland.
