= Wild leek =

Wild leek is a common name for several plants in the genus Allium It may refer to:

- Allium ampeloprasum, native to Eurasia, the wild ancestor of cultivated leeks
- Allium tricoccum, native to eastern North America
