= Henri de Tonti =

Italian-born French military officer and explorer (1649–1704)

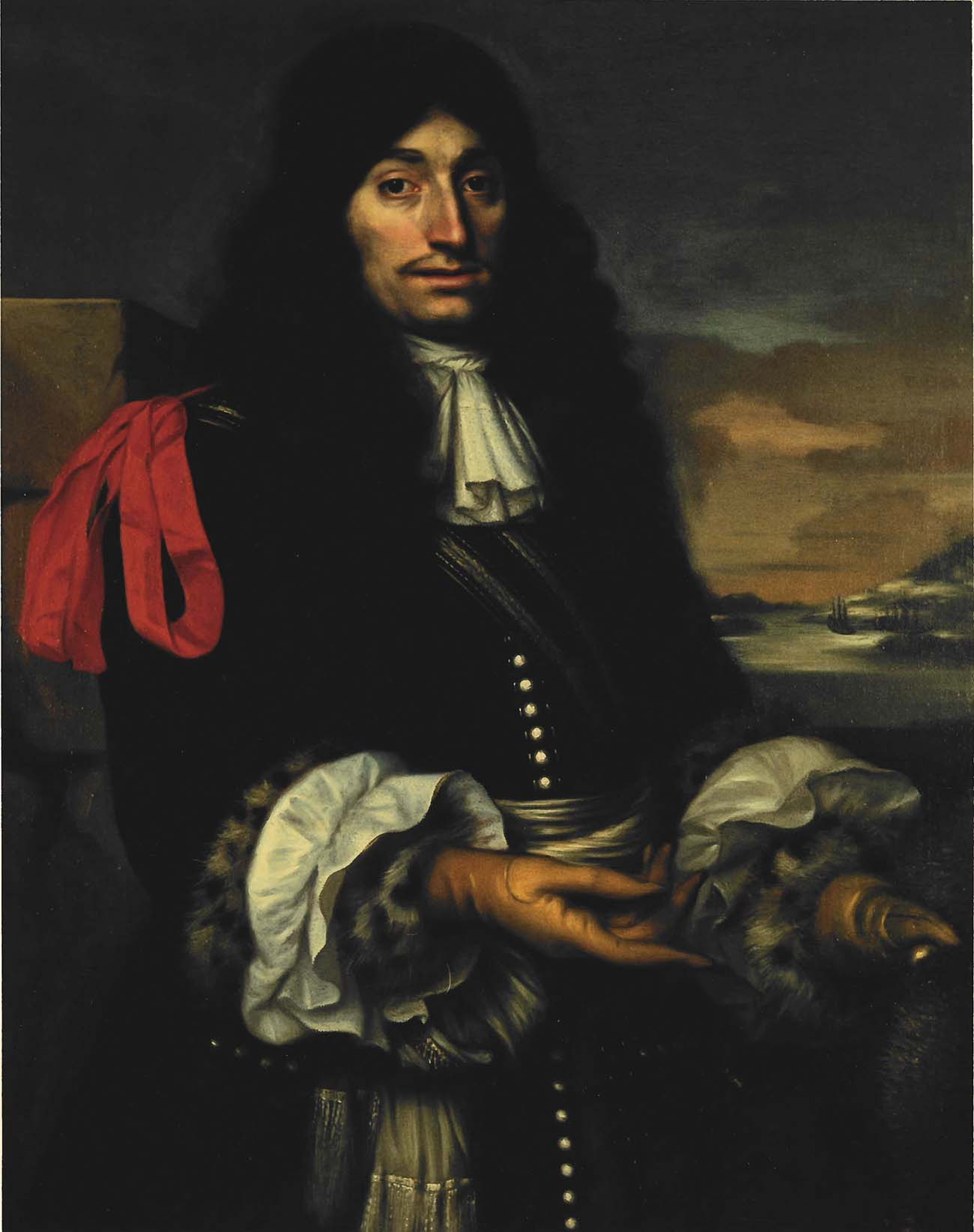
- Portrait attributed to Nicolaes Maes, History Museum of Mobile

Co-founder of Fort St. Louis, Illinois country
- In office Founded 1682
- Monarch: Louis XIV

Personal details
- Born: Enrico Tonti c. 1649 Gaeta, Italy
- Died: September 1704 (aged c. 55) Fort Louis, Louisiana (present-day Mobile County, Alabama)
- Cause of death: Yellow fever
- Relations: Lorenzo de Tonti (father); Alphonse de Tonti (brother)
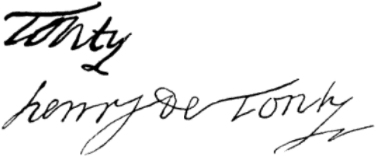
- Signature
- Nicknames: "Father of Arkansas"; "Iron Hand"

Military service
- Allegiance: France
- Years of service: c. 1668–1676
- Rank: Captain
- Battles: Franco-Dutch War: Sicily (WIA) (POW)

Henri de Tonti (born Enrico Tonti; c. 1649 – September 1704) was an Italian-born French military officer and explorer who assisted René-Robert Cavelier, Sieur de La Salle during the French colonization of the Americas from 1678 to 1686. Tonti was one of the first explorers to navigate and sail the upper Great Lakes. He also sailed the Illinois and the Mississippi, to its mouth and thereupon claimed the length of the Mississippi for Louis XIV of France. He is credited with founding the settlement that would become Peoria, Illinois. Tonti established the first permanent European settlement in the lower Mississippi valley, known as Poste de Arkansea, making him "The Father of Arkansas".

== Early life and military service ==
Henri de Tonti was born in Gaeta, c. 1649, to Lorenzo and Isabelle (née di Lietto) de Tonti. His father was the governor of Gaeta and a Neapolitan banker. He is credited with inventing the tontine, a form of life insurance, though it has been suggested he merely modified existing Italian life insurance practices. Lorenzo was involved in a revolt against the Spanish viceroy in Naples, and the family was forced to seek asylum in France around the time of Henri's birth. Henri's brother Alphonse was born in 1659, and later became one of the founders of what is now Detroit. Henri de Tonti's cousins, Daniel Greysolon Dulhut and Claude Greysolon de La Tourette were also able to build a name for themselves in New France.

In 1668 around the age of 18, Tonti decided to join the French military. He was a cadet in the French Royal Army for his first two years of military service. For the following four years, Tonti was commissioned into the French Navy as a midshipman, being stationed at Marseille and Toulon and embarking on seven tours at sea, four of which were on tall ships and three on galleys. He later became captain-lieutenant of the maître de camp in Messina. This was a French army that Louis XIV sent to Sicily in 1675 under the command of the Duke of Vivonne to support the Messina revolt during the Franco-Dutch War.

Tonti took part in military operations in the village of Gesso, up the hills near Messina. He lost his hand in a grenade explosion, later replacing it with a metal appliance. He was also taken as a prisoner of war. After being detained for six months, Tonti was exchanged for the Governor's son. After returning to France, Tonti continued his deployment as a volunteer on the galleys. From that time on, he wore a prosthetic hook covered by a glove, thus earning the nickname "Iron Hand". Among the officers fighting beside the French expedition corps, there were the brothers Antonio and Thomas Crisafy, who years later de Tonti will have the chance to meet again in New France. After the Franco-Dutch War, De Tonti was unable to obtain employment until recruited by La Salle, for exploration.

== New France ==
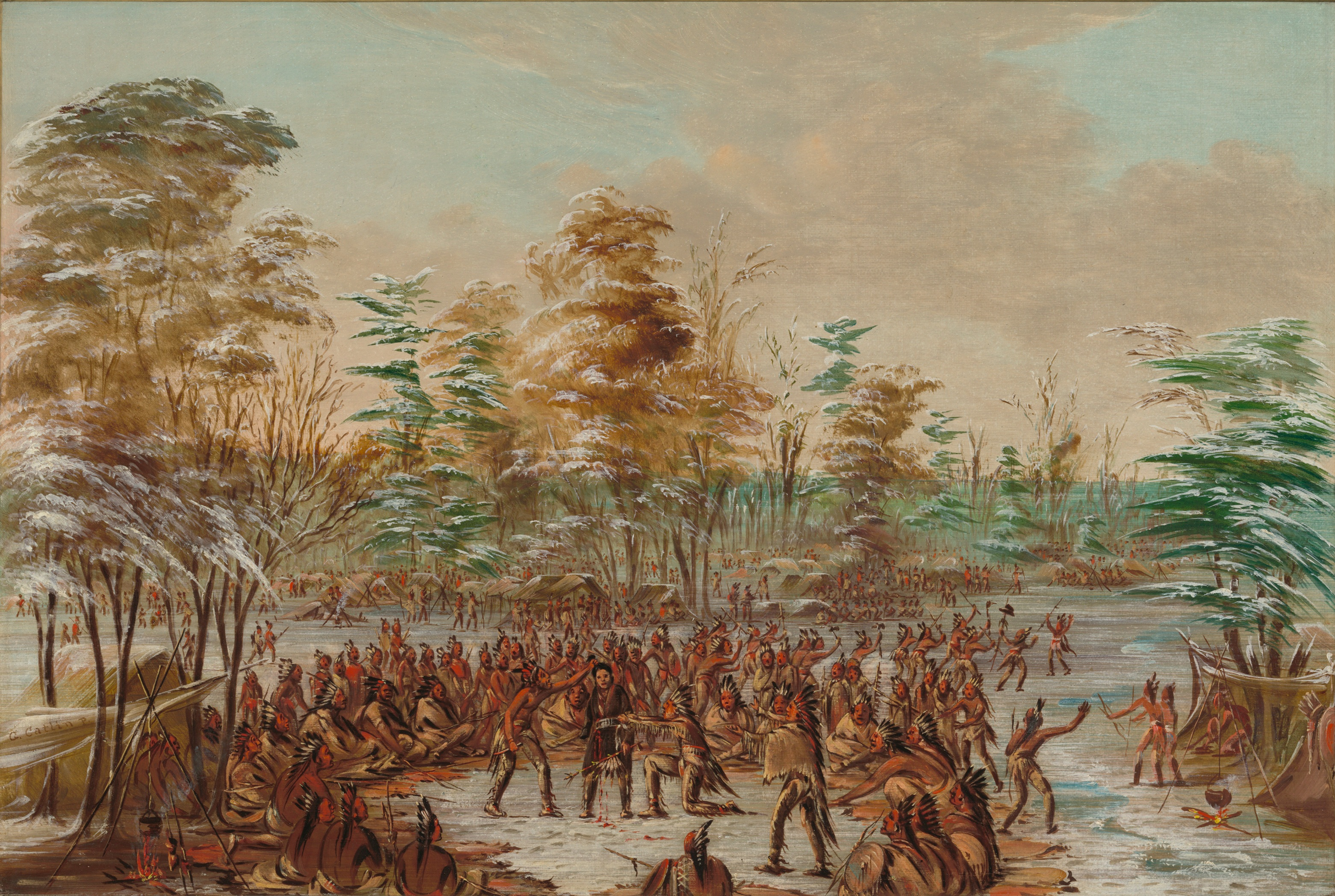
A painting of Henri de Tonti being stabbed during peace negotiations in the Iroquois Village on January 2, 1680, by George Catlin

In the summer of 1678, Tonti journeyed to Quebec with René-Robert Cavelier, Sieur de La Salle; who recognized him as an able associate and thus named De Tonti his lieutenant. On August 27, Tonti and La Salle arrived in Gulf St. Lawrence. Tonti described it as "A place extremely cold where no wheat grows". On December 26 of the same year, Tonti and La Salle reached the Niagara. Tonti was left to supervise the construction of Fort Conti below Niagara Falls and the construction of the Griffon in early 1679 above the falls, which was to be the first ship to sail the Great Lakes.

In August 1679, Tonti arrived at Fort Michilimackinac, the crossroads for southwestern fur trade, to which he discovered some of La Salle's crew had fled and traded many livres worth of goods. After rounding up the deserters, Tonti sailed to the mouth of the St. Joseph and helped establish Fort Miami. Early in 1680. Tonti also helped build Fort de Crèvecoeur in Illinois, which La Salle left Tonti to hold while he returned to Ontario. While on his return trip up the Illinois, La Salle concluded that Starved Rock might provide an ideal location for another fortification and sent word downriver to Tonti regarding this idea.

Following La Salle's instructions, Tonti took five men and departed up the river to evaluate the suitability of the Starved Rock site. Shortly after Tonti's departure, on April 16, 1680, the seven members of the expedition who remained at Fort de Crèvecoeur ransacked and abandoned the fort and began their own march back to Canada. f> This opened up opportunity for Iroquois warriors to attack, stabbing Tonti and forcing his men to retreat to Baie-des-Puants in late 1680. In 1681, after recuperating from his injuries, Tonti traveled to Fort Michilimackinac to rejoin La Salle.

=== Co-founder of Fort St. Louis, Illinois ===
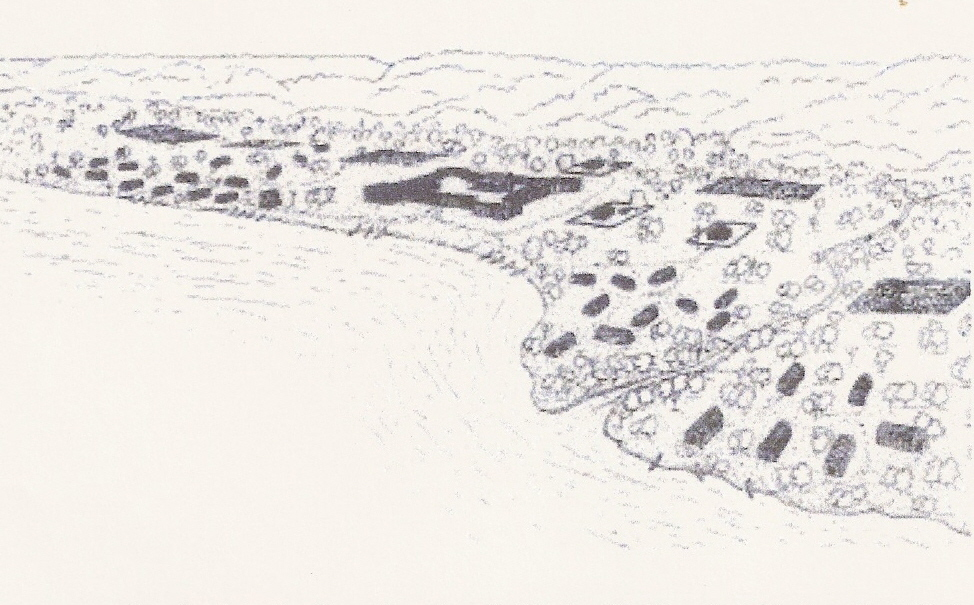
18th-century illustration of Fort Pimiteoui (present-day Peoria), residence and workplace of the governor

In the spring of 1682, Tonti journeyed with La Salle on his descent down the Mississippi and helped establish alliances with Native Americans by presenting the calumet (a peace pipe) to the Natchez tribe, allowing La Salle to travel three leagues inland to meet with their chief. Assuming they had made peace with the tribe, Tonti tried to convince the Natchez to relocate near their new fort, Fort St. Louis, to conduct trade with one another. La Salle departed for France in 1683 to gather colonists for a new Louisiana venture, leaving Tonti behind to hold Fort St. Louis.

In La Salle's absence, Joseph-Antoine Le Febvre de La Barre, the governor of New France, confiscated all of La Salle's new territory. Barring Tonti's aid in fighting off Iroquois attackers, Tonti was no longer in command of the Illinois territory and was replaced by Louis-Henri de Baugy. Tonti ventured back to Quebec in the spring of 1684. La Barre later rescinded his decision to seize La Salle's territories, and Tonti ventured back in 1685.

Word reached Tonti that La Salle was in the Gulf of Mexico, causing Tonti to proceed to the south in 1686 to try to meet him on his ascent. Instead of meeting La Salle, Tonti established a trading post in Arkansas, leaving six Frenchman to establish a permanent French settlement to trade with the Quapaw and hinder English colonial settlement in the east by establishing a presence in the middle of North America.

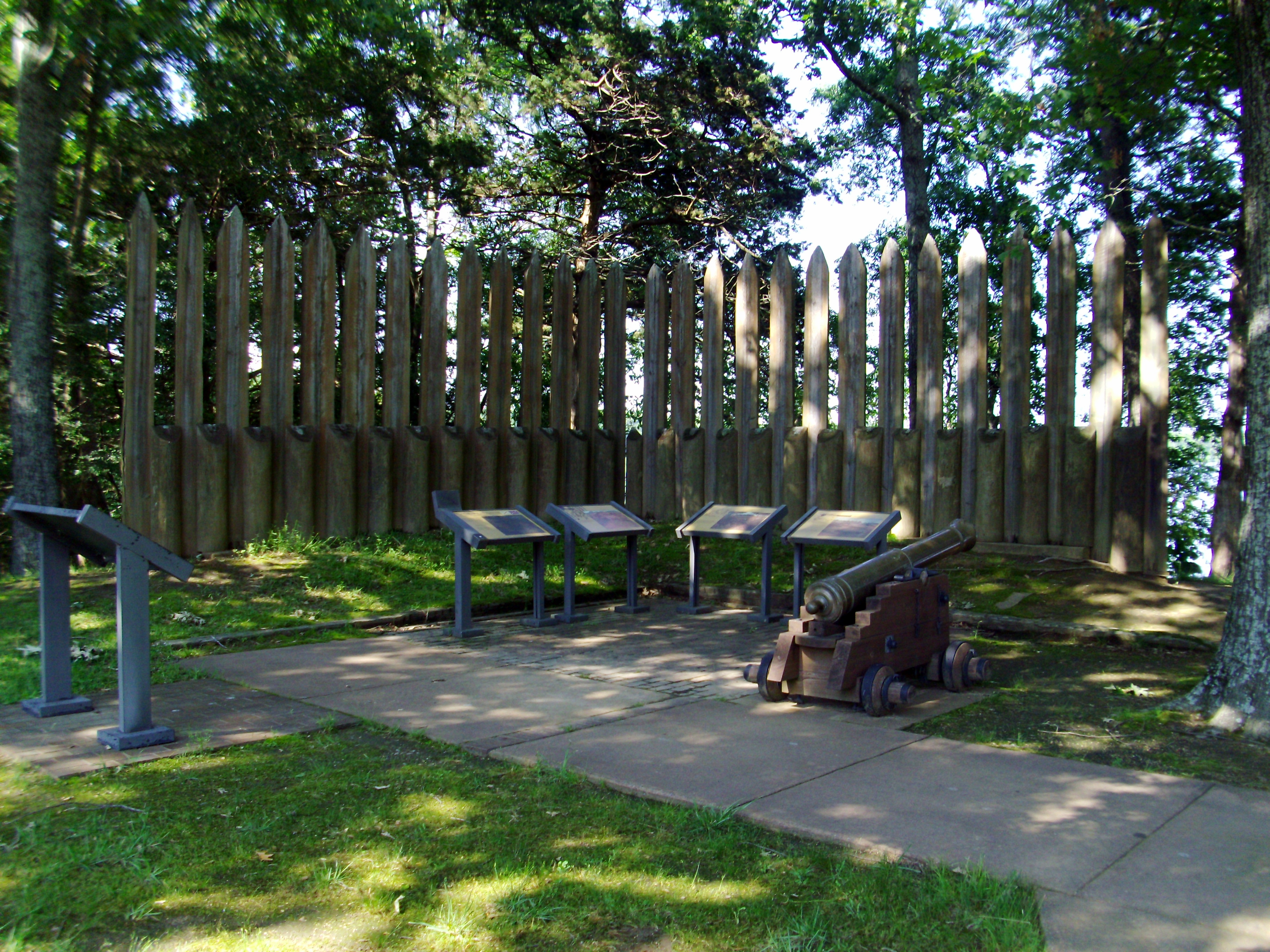
The partially reconstructed trading post in Arkansas (Poste de Arkansea) near Gillett

In 1689, after receiving news that La Salle had been killed by his own men, de Tonti had begun journeying to La Salle's abandoned settlement in Baie Saint-Louis. Unfortunately, Tonti was ill-prepared and turned back before he could reach the settlement and returned to Illinois. In late winter 1690, resources grew scarce and he moved Fort St. Louis to Pimiteoui (present-day Peoria). This new Fort St. Louis (also known as Fort Pimiteoui) later became the main trading post for the French.

In the summer of 1685 Jacques-René de Brisay, Marquis de Denonville replaced La Barre as the governor of New France. Denonville decided that war with Iroquois was inevitable, promising Illinois "every protection" as well as consultation from De Tonti on military excursions. Denonville made de Tonti's key role in this military campaign, execution. Tonti was to mount an assault with 300 men from the rear of the Iroquois while Denonville launched a full frontal assault. Tonti was unable to mount a large enough number of his men, so he joined with Sieurs de l'hut and de la Durantais at the front of the strait. Tonti and the others proceeded to their rendezvous on Lake Ontario and met up with Denonville and took part in the van of the French attack against the Senecas.

They later set a military post in Niagara. In 1687, Tonti was engaged in conflict with English colonists and their Iroquois allies. During this period, he was also able to conduct treaties with Native American tribes. In 1690, after he was granted La Salle's fur trading commission, Tonti decided to aid French colonization in Illinois by engaging in trade. In the summer of 1697, he left Illinois in the care of his cousin Pierre de Liette. Tonti then commenced on a journey down the Mississippi to make contact with Pierre Le Moyne d'Iberville, who had established the Louisiana colony. Tonti reached Louisiana and joined the colony.

=== Later life and death ===
Following this, Tonti was offered by Pierre Moyne, Sieur d’Iberville the opportunity to work as a treaty negotiator and peacemaker. Working under Pierre Moyne, Sieur d’Iberville's brother Jean Baptiste Le Moyne de Bienville, Tonti was able to bring peace between the Choctaw and Chickasaw nations of Louisiana and proceeded to receive aid from the two nations. The use of his appliance that replaced his hand led these tribes to believe he had special powers. Tonti died in September 1704 from yellow fever. It is believed that Tonti's “remains were laid to everlasting rest in an unknown grave near the Mobile, and not far from the monument erected in 1902 to commemorate the site of old Mobile".
