= Mission of the Guardian Angel =

17th-century Jesuit mission near present-day Chicago

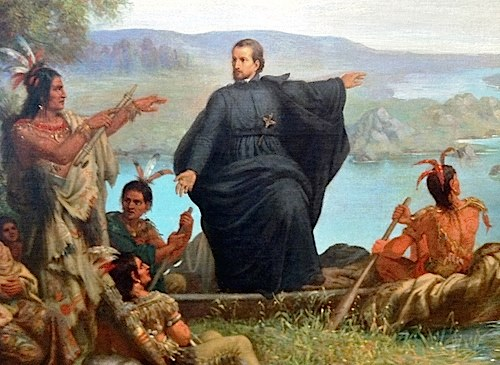
Jesuit missionary and Indians

The Mission of the Guardian Angel (French: Mission de l'Ange Gardien) was a 17th-century Jesuit mission in the vicinity of what is now Chicago, Illinois. It was established in 1696 by Father François Pinet, a French Jesuit priest. The mission was abandoned by 1700; its exact location remains unknown.

== Background ==
In the 17th century the Chicago area was inhabited by a number of Algonquian peoples, including the Mascouten and Miami tribes, who had migrated into northern Illinois and Wisconsin as a result of the Beaver Wars. Jesuit missionaries exploring the Great Lakes region had first encountered these tribes in the 1650s. The Miami had established some villages on the Des Plaines and Chicago Rivers in the mid-17th century, but these were abandoned in the 1650s as they moved west of the Mississippi and then to Wisconsin. Father Jacques Marquette on his first encounter with the Miami at a large village near what is now Portage, Wisconsin during his expedition with Louis Jolliet to the Mississippi River in 1673 described them as "the most civil, the most liberal, and the most shapely [of the three nations that occupied the village]." In the 1690s the Miami returned to the Chicago area, establishing two villages; one at the mouth of the Chicago River, and another about 3 miles (4.8 km) upstream on the north branch of the river.

== Pinet's Mission ==
Pierre François Pinet was born at Périgueux in France on November 11, 1660, and entered the Jesuit novitiate at Bordeaux in 1682. He travelled to Canada in 1694, arriving first in Quebec then travelling to Montreal, Ville-Marie, and Michillimackinac. In 1696 Pinet established the Mission of the Guardian Angel at Chicago, but he was soon forced to abandon the mission by Louis de Buade de Frontenac, the Governor General of New France. An appeal was made to François de Laval, bishop of New France, and the mission was re-established in 1698. Sometime after 1700, the Miamis started to move to the Maumee and Wabash valleys in Indiana, and the mission was permanently abandoned. After the closing of the Mission of the Guardian Angel at Chicago, Pinet moved to work amongst the Illiniwek tribes living at Cahokia. He then moved with the Illiniwek to join the Kaskaskia tribe on the north bank of the River des Peres in what is now St. Louis, Missouri. A letter by Father Bergier dated March 1, 1703 states that Pinet died at River des Peres on August 1, 1702.

== Location ==
The exact location of the Mission of the Guardian Angel in unknown but various historians have proposed a number of sites in the Chicago area. The only contemporary source that gives any clues as to the location is a letter, dated January 2, 1699, from Jean-François Buisson de Saint-Cosme to François de Laval in which he relates a visit to the mission. John Gilmary Shea published an English translation of the letter in 1861; however, Chicago historian Milton Milo Quaife, writing in 1913, noted that Shea's translation "frequently departs from the original manuscript" and that differences in translation may account for some of the different sites proposed.

Describing his visit to the Mission of the Guardian Angel, Saint-Cosme wrote:

We remained five days at Kipikaoui, leaving on the 17th and after being windbound on the 18th and 19th we camped on the 20th at a place five leagues from Chikagou. We should have arrived there early on the 21st but the wind which suddenly arose on the lake compelled us to land half a league from Etpikagou. We had considerable difficulty in landing and in saving our canoes; we all had to jump into the water. One must be very careful along the lakes, and especially Lake Mixcigan, whose shores are very low, to take to the land as soon as possible when the waves rise on the lake, for the rollers become so high in so short a time that one runs the risk of breaking his canoe and of losing all it contains. Many travellers have already been wrecked there. We, Monsieur de Montigny, Davion, and myself, went by land to the house of the Reverend Jesuit Fathers while our people remained behind. We found there Reverend Father Pinet and Reverend Father Binneteau, who had recently arrived from the Illinois country and was slightly ill. I cannot describe to you, my lord, with what cordiality and manifestations of friendship these Reverend Fathers received and embraced us while we had the consolation of residing with them. Their house is built on the bank of a small river, with the lake on one side and a fine and vast prairie on the other. The village of the savages contains over a hundred and fifty cabins, and a league up the river is still another village almost as large. They are all Miamis. Reverend Father Pinet usually resides there except in winter, when the savages are all engaged in hunting, and then he goes to the Illinois. We saw no savages there; they had already started for their hunt. If one may judge of the future from the short time that Reverend Father Pinet has passed in this mission, we may believe that if God will bless the labors and the zeal of that holy missionary there will be a great number of good and fervent Christians. It is true that but slight results are obtained with reference to the older persons, who are hardened in profligacy, but all the children are baptized, and the jugglers even, who are the most opposed to Christianity, allow their children to be baptized. They are also very glad to let them be instructed. Several girls of a certain age and also many young boys have already been and are being instructed, so that we may hope that when the old stock dies off, they will be a new and entirely Christian people.

In 1907 Frank Reed Grover, used Shea's translation to propose that the mission had not actually been located at Chicago, but rather further north on the north branch of the Chicago River, near Skokie, Illinois. Quaife, working from a duplicate of the original manuscript concluded that the mission was built on the banks of the main stem of the Chicago River, somewhere between the forks and its mouth in what is now downtown Chicago. Other locations proposed include Lake Calumet and a location near Goose Island.

Other locations suggested have been Evanston by the Evanston Historical Society, Lake Calumet by Hurlbut, Churchill Woods by V. P. Web, Winnetka by the Saints Faith Hope and Charity Parish Winnetka, the Merchandise Mart by Swenson, Highland Park by Bower and Dooley, the area around LUMA (a Loyola University campus) by Loyola University Chicago, Gross Point by Grover, and Wilmette.
