= Verona Burkhard =

American artist (1910-2004)

- 1966 "Colorado Women of Achievement" award photo
- Born: Verona Lorraine Burkhard; June 8, 1910; Paris, France
- Died: July 16, 2004 (aged 94); Grand Junction, Colorado
- Occupation: artist
- Years active: 1933-1980
- Known for: U.S. post office murals

Verona Burkhard (June 8, 1910 – July 16, 2004) was an American artist, known for her murals painted for the U.S. Treasury Department. She participated in four public projects including three United States post office murals and five murals completed for the Immigration and Naturalization Service. She has works in the permanent collections of the Smithsonian American Art Museum and the Western Colorado Center for the Arts. As of 2015, her murals completed for the post offices of Powell, Wyoming; Deer Lodge, Montana; and Kings Mountain, North Carolina are still hanging in the buildings which were the original post offices. In addition to her public artworks, Burkhard received the 1943 Alger Award from the National Association of Women Artists and was one of the first honorees of the "Colorado Women of Achievement" program in 1966.

== Early life ==
Verona Lorraine Burkhard was born on June 8, 1910, in Paris, France, to Verona P. (née Turini) and Henri Burkhard. Her parents were both American artists, studying in Paris. Her mother, who used the professional name Vee Burkhard, was a fashion artist, while her father was a noted painter. Her grandfather, Giovanni Turini was a sculptor, who sculpted Washington Square Park's statue of Giuseppe Garibaldi called the "Sword of Italian Unification" and also Central Park's bronze bust of Giuseppe Mazzini. While she was still an infant, Burkhard's parents returned to the United States and settled in New York City. Under the tutelage of Boardman Robinson, she studied art at the Art Students League of New York, and then later at the Cooper Union.

== Career ==
During the 1930s, Burkhard resided and maintained studios in Leonia, New Jersey and nearby Tenafly.

Burkhard began working for the New Deal's Treasury Relief Art Project during the Great Depression. She was awarded the Powell, Wyoming post office mural in 1938 based upon drawing submitted for the post office in Dallas, Texas. When she received the commission to complete the Powell mural, Burkhard was living near Buffalo, Wyoming on the Klondike Ranch. Her mural, Powell’s Agriculture Resulting from the Shoshone Irrigation Project featured the positive outcomes for agriculture from federal development projects like the Shoshone Project. That same year, she was selected to complete the post office mural for Deer Lodge, Montana. Burkhard's submission, James and Granville Stuart Prospecting in Deer Lodge Valley—1858, featured Deer Lodge Valley from an 1860 sketch of the region. Townspeople were concerned that the large mountain behind the Stuarts should have depicted Mount Powell, a well-known local landmark. Though Burkhard felt that the composition was not as good with the landmark, she made the requested changes to prevent displeasing the citizens and jeopardizing her chances for other government commissions.

When she had finished the murals in Deer Lodge and Powell, Burkhard returned to New York, where she studied with Frank Mechau at Columbia University. She had a studio in Tenafly and submitted an entry for the Greybull, Wyoming post office, but didn't place in the running. In 1940, Burkhard submitted designs for the federal project to decorate the Los Angeles Terminal Annex, but the work was awarded to Boris Deutsch. Burkhard finished second in the competition, which meant that her designs were sent to the jury for the Immigration and Naturalization Service Building in Los Angeles, California project. She was selected to complete the series of murals, which depicted Mayan and Aztec civilization for immigration in 1941. The studies for six of the Immigration Building murals are housed at the Smithsonian American Art Museum. In a 1986 interview for the Mesa County Public Library, Burkhard told how she completed five large canvasses and went out to California to deliver them. When she arrived, the immigration building was cordoned off and guards prohibited anyone entering due to World War II. She contacted her boss, and he had her bring them to Washington, D.C. to hang in the WAVES Administration Buildings, though she did not know what happened to them at the end of the war when the temporary site was closed.

Burkhard also won the commission in 1941 to complete the post office mural for Kings Mountain, North Carolina. The mural, The Battle of Kings Mountain, depicts scenes of the historic local battle during the American Revolution. In the 1980s, the mural was moved to City Hall after a new post office was built, but the painting was restored to the original building, which is now the Kings Mountain Historical Museum, in 2015. At the end of the year, she was also in the group of finalists for the Provo, Utah post office murals, though it would eventually go to another artist. In 1943, Burkhard won the Alger Award for her painting Horse Fair at Mt. Timpanogos from the National Association of Women Artists. Between 1945 and 1946, she was in charge of the art program at Potomac School in Washington, D. C.

In 1949, Burkhard moved to Grand Junction, Colorado and soon began working with other local artists to develop an art center for the area. In 1953, they began a funding drive for the Mesa County Fine Arts Center, hosting balls, art shows and a drive through local schools to raise money for the project. In 1960, they purchased and renovated an old home to house the center. In 1966, Burkhard's work to build the center and promote the arts was recognized, when she along with Jo Elliott and Sister Frances Marie Walsh were named as "Colorado Women of Achievement" in the first awards recognition for the program. The award, judged by five members from throughout the state, selected the three women from 102 nominees and presented their awards at a banquet held in Denver. Burkhard built a studio from a barn behind her house for completing ceramics, metal sculpture and paintings and taught art in a school she opened in downtown Grand Junction. She worked with the public school system as well on various art projects and continued exhibiting into the 1970s throughout the western states. Burkhard died July 16, 2004, in Grand Junction.

== Selected works ==
- 1938 Powell’s Agriculture Resulting from the Shoshone Irrigation Project, Powell, Wyoming
- 1939 James and Granville Stuart Prospecting in Deer Lodge Valley—1858, Deer Lodge, Montana
- 1941, six murals at the Immigration and Naturalization Service Building, Los Angeles, California
- 1941 The Battle of Kings Mountain, Kings Mountain, North Carolina

== Legacy ==
In addition to her three post office works which as of 2015 still adorned the post offices of Powell, Wyoming; Deer Lodge, Montana; and Kings Mountain, North Carolina, Burkhard's sketches for the Los Angeles Immigration Building are housed at the Smithsonian. Her painting Lake Powell Fantasy is in the permanent collection of the Western Colorado Center for the Arts in Grand Junction, as is a portrait in which Burkhard is the subject, by the artist Ruth Wilcox. In 2014, an exhibition titled "Western Slope Avant Garde Past and Present Plus One" held at the Western Colorado Center for the Arts featured her works along with other selected artists from the area.
