= Statue of Giuseppe Garibaldi (New York City) =

Bronze sculpture of Giuseppe Garibaldi in Manhattan, New York, U.S.

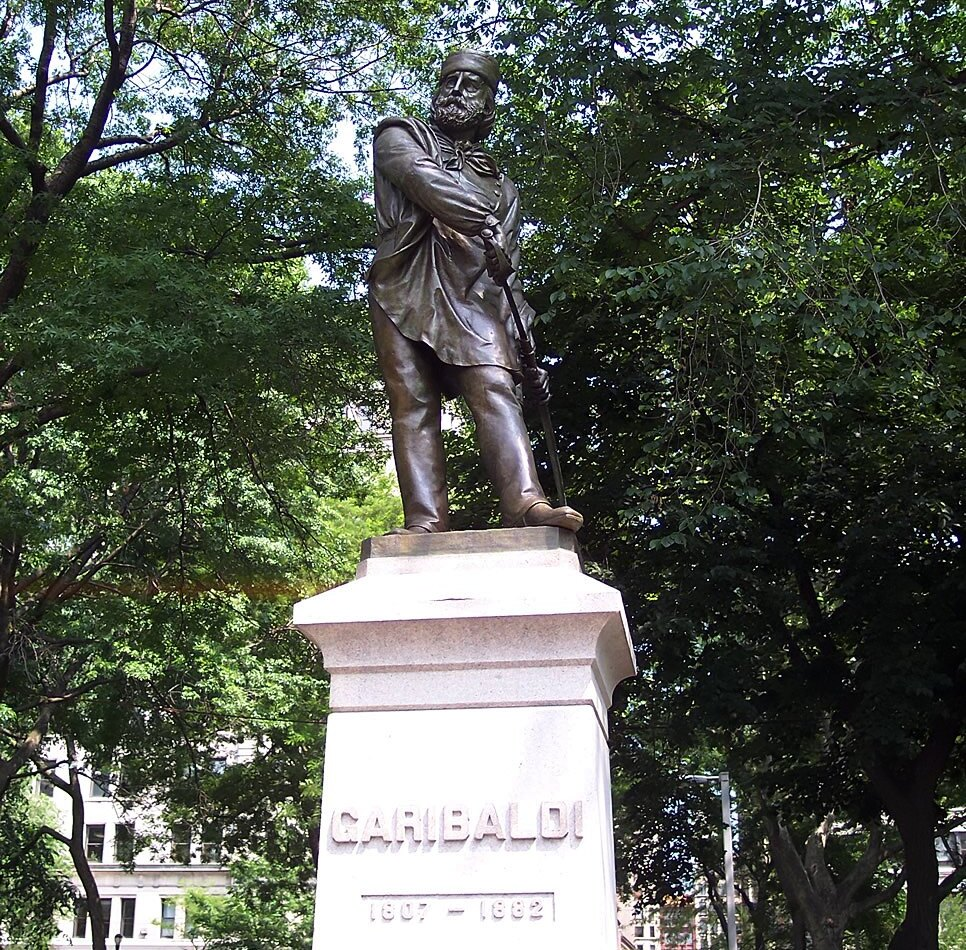
- The sculpture in 2005
- Artist: Giovanni Turini
- Year: 1888
- Type: Sculpture
- Medium: Bronze
- Subject: Giuseppe Garibaldi
- Location: New York City, New York, United States; 40.73043°N 73.99686°W

An outdoor bronze sculpture of Giuseppe Garibaldi, one of the leaders of Italian unification, is installed in Washington Square Park in Manhattan, New York.

== Description and history ==
The statue and its granite pedestal were created by Giovanni Turini upon the organization of the editors of the newspaper Il Progresso Italo-Americano to raise funds to commemorate Garibaldi after his death. Turini was a volunteer member of Garibaldi's Fourth Regiment in the campaign against Austria in 1866. The statue was dedicated on June 4, 1888.

In 1970, in order to construct a new promenade through the park, the statue was moved fifteen feet to the east. During its movement, a glass vessel from the 1880s was discovered beneath the statue containing newspaper articles of Garibaldi's death, a history of the Committee for the Monument of Garibaldi, and poster and news clippings describing the statue's dedication.

The statue is mentioned in Robert W. Chambers' 1895 short story "The Repairer of Reputations" as having been replaced in the story's timeline by a statue of Peter Stuyvesant.

== See also ==
- 1888 in art
