= Giovanni Turini =

American sculptor (1841–1899)

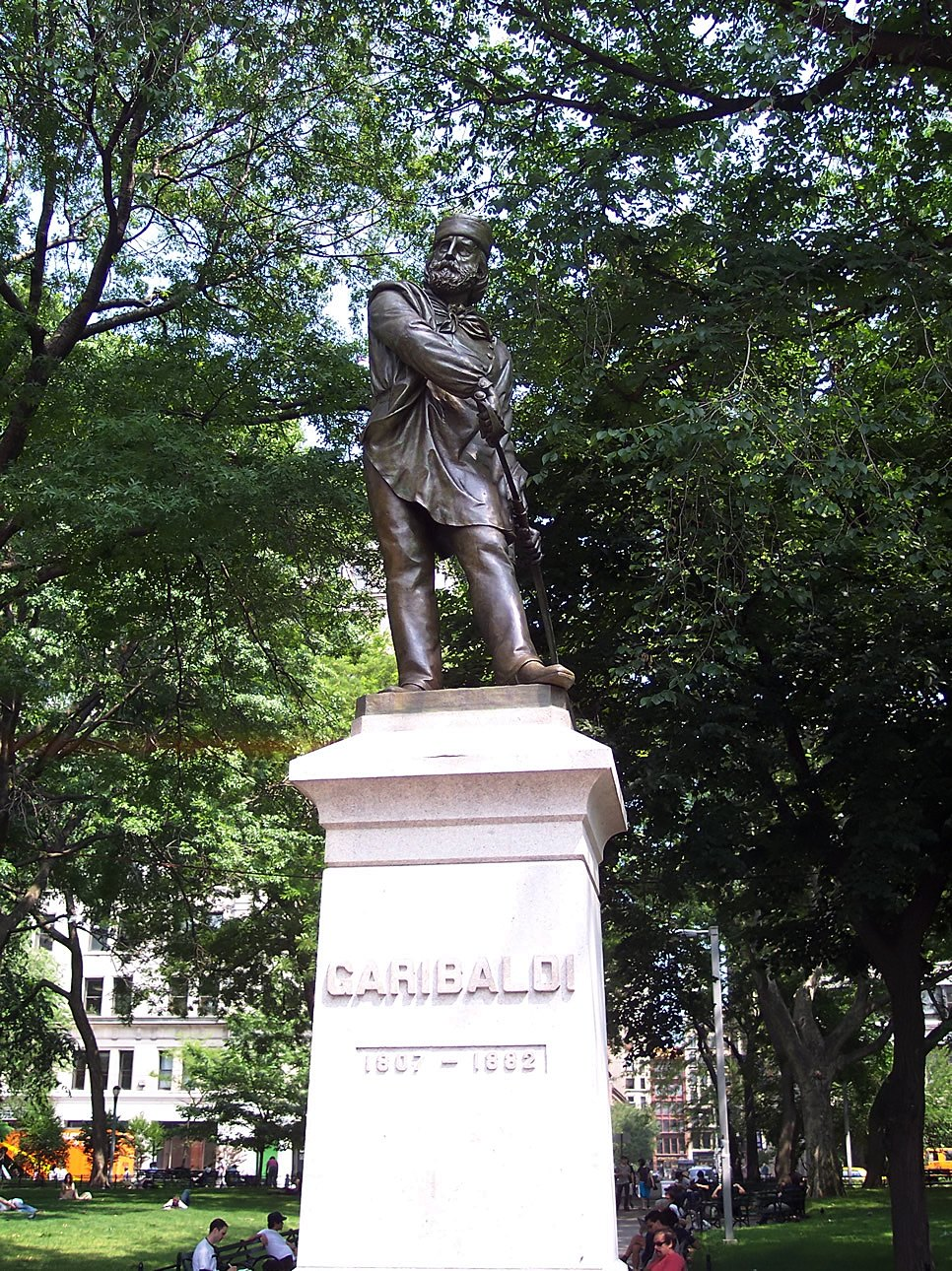
Giuseppe Garibaldi

Giovanni Turini (May 23, 1841 – August 27, 1899) was an American sculptor, born in Verona, Austrian Empire. He immigrated to the United States in the late 1860s. He is best remembered as a portrait and historical sculptor.

His portrait bust of Giuseppe Mazzini, which he created in 1876 and was dedicated in 1878 was funded by the New York Italian American community and was one of the early examples of public statuary in the city.

Turini, who served with Giuseppe Garibaldi as a volunteer during Italy's war with Austria in 1866, created Garibaldi's statue in Washington Square Park in 1888. His statue was initially designed to be a part of a three figure group, with Garibaldi standing on top of a boulder. However funds to complete the entire project, which was running well above projected costs, proved to be inadequate, so while Turini was abroad the design was changed and Garibaldi was placed atop a fairly standard pedestal. It turned out in order to get the statue's feet to stand properly on the base, following its being designed and cast to be placed on an uneven surface, the legs had to be repositioned, leading to Turini's calling those responsible "cruel amputators" and the New York Times writing, "The man who suggested the change is said to have argued with Garibaldi's friends in the Italian colony on the basis that Garibaldi was dead anyway, and he would not object, forgetting that the public might some day realize that it had a monstrosity of a statue on its hands."

His submission for a statue of Simon Bolivar for New York was "flatly rejected" by the National Sculpture Society in about 1899. The commission was ultimately awarded to Sally James Farnham.

Turini's granddaughter was painter and muralist Verona Burkhard.

Turini's grandson is the renowned Canadian classical pianist Ronald Turini.

== Selected works ==
- Giuseppe Mazzini, Central Park, New York, New York, 1878
- Giuseppe Garibaldi, Washington Square Park, New York, New York, 1888
- Evangeline, Jersey City Museum, Jersey City, New Jersey 1888
