= List of United States political families (F) =

The following is an alphabetical list of political families in the United States whose last name begins with F.

== The Fairbanks ==
- Erastus Fairbanks (1792–1864), Vermont House of Representatives 1836, Governor of Vermont 1852–53, 1860–61, Delegate to the 1856 Republican National Convention. Father of Horace Fairbanks and Franklin Fairbanks, uncle of Edward T. Fairbanks.
  - Horace Fairbanks (1820–1888), Vermont State Senator, Governor of Vermont 1876–78. Son of Erastus Fairbanks.
  - Franklin Fairbanks (1828–1895), Speaker of the Vermont House of Representatives, 1872–74. Son of Erastus Fairbanks.
  - Edward T. Fairbanks (1836–1919), Vermont State Senate, 1908–10. Nephew of Erastus Fairbanks. Cousin of Horace Fairbanks and Franklin Fairbanks.

== The Fairbanks of Indiana, Michigan, and New York ==
- Merton W. Fairbank, Michigan State Representative 1905–08. First cousin once removed of Charles W. Fairbanks.
  - Charles W. Fairbanks (1852–1918), candidate for U.S. Senate from Indiana 1893, delegate to the Republican National Convention 1896 1900 1912, U.S. Senator from Indiana 1897–1905, Vice President of the United States 1905–09, candidate for the Republican nomination for President of the United States 1908 1916, candidate for Vice President of the United States 1916. First cousin once removed of Merton W. Fairbank.
  - Alexander W. Fairbank, New York Assemblyman 1914–15. Third cousin once removed of Merton W. Fairbank.
  - Earl Fairbanks, delegate to the Republican National Convention 1900, Michigan State Representative 1903–06, Michigan State Senator 1907–10. Relative of Charles W. Fairbanks.

== The Fairchilds ==
- Benjamin L. Fairchild (1863–1946), five-time New York State Republican Congressman
- Charles S. Fairchild (1842–1924), New York State Attorney General, 38th U.S Secretary of Treasury
- George Winthrop Fairchild (1854–1924), New York State Republican Senator, father of Sherman Mills Fairchild
- Hiram Orlando Fairchild (1845–1925), Speaker of the Wisconsin State Assembly
- Jairus C. Fairchild (1801–1862), First Treasurer of Wisconsin 1848–52, First Mayor of Madison, Wisconsin 1856–57. Father of Cassius Fairchild and Lucius Fairchild.
  - Cassius Fairchild (1829–1868), Wisconsin Assemblyman 1860. Son of Jairus C. Fairchild.
  - Lucius Fairchild (1831–1896), Wisconsin Secretary of State 1864–66, Governor of Wisconsin 1866–72, U.S. Minister to Spain 1880–81. Son of Jairus C. Fairchild.
- Mark J. Fairchild, 1986 Democratic Lieutenant Gubernatorial candidate for Illinois, associated with Lyndon LaRouche Jr.
- Roger Fairchild, 1990 Republican Gubernatorial candidate for Idaho.

See also Fairchild family

== The Fairchilds of Wisconsin ==
- Edward T. Fairchild (1872–1965), Wisconsin State Senator, candidate for Governor of Wisconsin 1910, Circuit Court Judge in Milwaukee County, Wisconsin 1916–30; Justice of the Wisconsin Supreme Court 1930–57. Father of Thomas E. Fairchild.
  - Thomas E. Fairchild (1912–2007), Attorney General of Wisconsin 1948–51, candidate for U.S. Senate from Wisconsin 1950 1952, U.S. Attorney in Wisconsin 1951–52, Justice of the Wisconsin Supreme Court 1957–66, Judge of the U.S. Court of Appeals 1966–75, Chief Judge of the U.S. Court of Appeals 1975–81. Son of Edward T. Fairchild.

== The Fallons ==
- Christopher Fallon (born 1953), Member of Massachusetts House of Representatives from the 33rd Middlesex District 2003-2015, Member of Massachusetts House of Representatives from the 36th Middlesex District 1997-2003. Brother of Thomas H. Fallon, uncle of Deborah Fallon.
- Thomas H. Fallon (1942-2010), Mayor of Malden, Massachusetts 1982-1986, Chairman of Malden, Massachusetts School Committee 1971-1980, Assistant Register of Probate for Middlesex County, Massachusetts, Assistant City Solicitor for Malden, Massachusetts 1973-1982. Father of Deborah Fallon, nephew of Christopher Fallon.
  - Deborah Fallon (born 1966), City of Malden, Massachusetts City Councilor-At-Large, Candidate for Mayor of Malden, Massachusetts 2011, Director of Portal to Hope (Anti-Domestic Violence Non-profit). Daughter of Thomas H. Fallon, niece of Christopher Fallon.

== The Fannins ==
- Paul J. Fannin (1907–2002), Governor of Arizona 1959–65, delegate to the Republican National Convention 1960 1964, U.S. Senator from Arizona 1965–77. Father of Bob Fannin.
  - Bob Fannin (born 1936), Chairman of the Arizona Republican Party 2002, delegate to the Republican National Convention 2004. Son of Paul J. Fannin.

== The Farabees ==
- Ray Farabee (1932–2014), member of the Texas State Senate 1975–88, husband of Helen Farabee, father of David Farabee
- Helen Farabee (1934–1988), mental health activist in Texas, first wife of Ray Farabee and mother of David Farabee
  - David Farabee (born 1964), member of the Texas House of Representatives for Wichita Falls from 1999 to 2011, son Ray and Helen Farabee

== The Farleys of New York ==
- James Farley (1888–1976), New York U.S. Postmaster General 1932–40, Chairman Democratic National Committee 1932–40, Campaign Manager Franklin D. Roosevelt for President 1932–36, Chairman of the New York State Democratic Committee 1930–44, Secretary of the New York State Democratic Committee 1928–32(?), Campaign Manager Franklin D. Roosevelt for Governor of New York 1928–30, Campaign Manager Alfred E. Smith for Governor of New York 1926–28, Delegate to the Democratic National Convention 1924–68, Chairman of the New York State Athletic Commission 1924–32, New York State Assemblyman 1922–1924, Chairman of the Rockland County Democratic Party 1918–1932(?), Port Warden of the City of New York 1918–20, Town Supervisor of Stony Point 1914–18, Town Clerk of Stony Point 1910–18.
  - James A. Farley Jr. (1928–1986), Chairman of the New York State Athletic Commission 1975–77, Athletics Commissioner 1956–65.

== The Farnsworths of California ==
- Joseph Farnsworth (1869–1944), Idaho state agriculture official 1900-18 (president of Idaho Grazing Association, Idaho Sheep Shearing Association, and Idaho Honey Producers Association; Idaho state bee inspector for Bonneville County); moved to Long Beach, California 1918; unsuccessful candidate for City Council, Sixth District, 1924; vice president, Long Beach Apartment House Association, 1925–26; elected to the City Council, Sixth District, 1927, with the reform group "The Straight Eight," served as mayor pro tem; co-chairman of a citizens committee that recommended improvements to local wastewater handling, 1929–30; unsuccessful candidate for a second City Council term, 1930 and 1934; sued to block the city's proposed acquisition of land in a neighboring county for water development, 1931; co-led an unsuccessful campaign to recall members of the City Council, 1932. Fourth cousin of John F. Farnsworth (1820–1897), member of the U.S. House of Representatives from Illinois, 1857–61 and 1863–73.
  - Philo T. Farnsworth (1876–1952), (cousin of the inventor of the same name), Republican nominee for the U.S. Senate from Utah in 1940, alternate delegate to the Republican National Convention that year. First cousin once removed of Joseph Farnsworth.
  - Lois A. Farnsworth (1897–1964), precinct election clerk 1954, precinct election inspector 1957, Long Beach, California. Daughter-in-law of Joseph Farnsworth.
  - Karl V. Steinbrugge (1919–2001), member, Governor's Earthquake Council (during Gov. Reagan's administration); first chairman of the California Seismic Safety Commission, 1975–77; engineering consultant and/or working group chairman in the Office of Science and Technology, Executive Office of the President, in the Nixon and Carter administrations. Grandson-in-law of Joseph Farnsworth.
  - Richard A. Walker (1962– ), campaign aide, David J. Bellis for Signal Hill (California) City Council, 1980; co-chairman of the committee to recall Signal Hill Mayor Marion F. McCallen and Councilman Reginald G. Balchin, 1980; City of Signal Hill Administrative Review Committee, 1984–85; Military Academy Selection Board, California 4th Congressional District, 1996 and 1997; chairman, Roseville Pointe (California) Annexation Committee, 1997–99. Great-grandson of Joseph Farnsworth.

Note: Joseph Farnsworth's wife, Agnes Bird, was related through three families to President Franklin D. Roosevelt. Richard A. Walker is a maternal cousin of Patricia Martinez, Anthony Martinez and Edmund Gil.

== The Farrs of California ==
- Fred Farr, member of the California State Senate (1955–1967). Graduated from the University of California, Berkeley and Boalt Hall Law School. An ardent environmentalist, he kept the state from building a coastal freeway through Big Sur, preserving the unspoiled nature of coastal Highway 1. He wrote legislation mandating toilets for field workers. After leaving the Senate to take a transportation position in the Johnson administration, he served on the board of many organizations including the Monterey Bay Aquarium and the University of California, Santa Cruz.
  - Sam Farr, U.S. House of Representatives, 20th district (2013–2017); U.S. House of Representatives 17th district (1993–2013), member of the California State Assembly 28th district (1980–1993)

== The Farrellys ==
- Patrick Farrelly (1770–1826), Pennsylvania State Representative 1811–12, U.S. Representative from Pennsylvania 1821–26. Father of David M. Farrelly and John Wilson Farrelly.
  - David M. Farrelly, Register and Recorder of Deeds of Crawford County, Pennsylvania 1830; delegate to the Pennsylvania Constitutional Convention 1836; Burgess of Meadville, Pennsylvania 1847. Son of Patrick Farrelly.
  - John Wilson Farrelly (1809–1860), Pennsylvania State Senator 1828 1838–42, Pennsylvania State Representative 1837, U.S. Representative from Pennsylvania 1847–49, Auditor of the U.S. Treasury 1849–53. Son of Patrick Farrelly.

== The Farringtons ==
- Wallace Rider Farrington (1871–1933), Governor of Hawaii Territory 1921–29. Father of Joseph Rider Farrington.
  - Joseph Rider Farrington (1897–1954), Hawaii Territory Senator 1934–42, U.S. Congressional Delegate from Hawaii Territory 1943–54. Son of Wallace Rider Farrington.
  - Elizabeth P. Farrington (1898–1984), delegate to the Republican National Convention 1952, U.S. Congressional Delegate from Hawaii Territory 1954–57. Wife of Joseph Rider Farrington.

== The Farwells and Lovejoys ==
- Owen Lovejoy (1811–1864), U.S. Representative from Illinois 1857–1964. Cousin of Nathan A. Farwell.
- Nathan A. Farwell (1812–1893), Maine State Senator 1853–54 1861–62, Maine State Representative 1960 1863–64, delegate to the Republican National Convention 1864, U.S. Senator from Maine 1864–65. Cousin of Owen Lovejoy.

NOTE: Owen Lovejoy was also third cousin twice removed of Rockland, Maine Mayor John H. Lovejoy.

== The Fates and Sullivans ==
- Hugh Fate (1929–2021), Alaska State Representative 2002–05.
  - Dan Sullivan (born 1964), Assistant Secretary of State for Economic and Business Affairs 2006–09, Attorney General of Alaska 2009–10, Commissioner of the Alaska Department of Natural Resources 2010–13, U.S. Senator from Alaska 2015–present. Son-in-law of Hugh Fate.

== The Faulkners ==
- Charles J. Faulkner (1806–1884), Virginia House Delegate 1829–34 1848–49, Virginia State Senator 1838–42, delegate to the Virginia Constitutional Convention 1850, U.S. Representative from Virginia 1851–59, U.S. Minister to France 1859–61, delegate to the West Virginia Constitutional Convention 1872, U.S. Representative from West Virginia 1875–77. Father of Charles James Faulkner.
  - Charles James Faulkner (1847–1929), Circuit Court Judge in West Virginia, U.S. Senator from West Virginia 1887–99. Son of Charles J. Faulkner.

== The Feighans ==
- Michael A. Feighan (1905–1992), Ohio State Representative 1937–40, U.S. Representative for Ohio 1943–71, delegate to the Democratic National Convention 1944 1948 1952 1956 1968. Father of William Matthews Feighan.
  - William Matthews Feighan, Ohio State Representative. Son of Michael A. Feighan.
  - Edward F. Feighan (born 1947), Ohio State Representative 1973–79, Commissioner of Cuyahoga County, Ohio 1979–82; delegate to the Ohio Democratic Convention 1978; delegate to the Democratic National Convention 1980; U.S. Representative from Ohio 1973–83. Nephew of Michael A. Feighan.

== The Felches, Grants, and Lawrences ==
- Wolcott Lawrence, Michigan Territory Councilman 1824–31. Father-in-law of Alpheus Felch.
  - Alpheus Felch (1804–1896), Michigan State Representative 1835–37, candidate for U.S. Representative from Michigan 1840, Auditor General of Michigan 1842, Justice of the Michigan Supreme Court 1842–45, Governor of Michigan 1846–47, U.S. Senator from Michigan 1847–53. Son-in-law of Wolcott Lawrence.
    - Claudius B. Grant (1835–1921), Michigan State Representative 1871–74, Prosecuting Attorney of Houghton County, Michigan 1877; Circuit Court Judge in Michigan 1882–89; Justice of the Michigan Supreme Court 1890–98 1899–1908 1909; 1898–99 1908. Son-in-law of Alpheus Felch.

== The Fellows of Maine ==
- Lewis W. Fling, New Hampshire State Senator 1871–73. Father-in-law of Oscar F. Fellows.
  - Oscar F. Fellows (1857–1921), Maine State Representative 1901–03. Speaker of the House, Maine, 1903. Son-in-law of Lewis F. Fling.
    - Raymond Fellows, Attorney General of Maine 1925–28, Justice of the Maine Supreme Court 1946–54, Chief Justice of the Maine Supreme Court 1954–56. Son of Oscar F. Fellows.
    - Frank Fellows (1889–1951), Clerk of the U.S. District Court of Maine 1917–20, U.S. Representative from Maine 1941–51. Son of Oscar F. Fellows.

== The Fellows of Iowa ==
- Liberty Fellows (1834–1912) Member of the Iowa House of Representatives (1866–68). Iowa state senator 1868–72. Judge of the 13th judicial district 1889–1912. Father of Albert Fellows.
  - Albert Fellows (1864–1932) Member of the Iowa Senate 1913–1921. Mayor of Lansing, Iowa 1903–08, 1921–31.

== The Felts ==
See Felt family

== The Feltons ==
- William Harrell Felton (1823–1909), U.S. Representative from Georgia, 1875–81; husband of Rebecca Felton.
- Rebecca Latimer Felton (1835–1930), U.S. Senator from Georgia, 1922; first woman in U.S. Senate; wife of William H. Felton.

== The Fendalls, Dents, and Worthingtons ==
See Fendall-Dent-Worthington family political line

== The Fenners ==
- Arthur Fenner (1745–1805), Governor of Rhode Island 1790–1805. Father of James Fenner.
  - James Fenner (1771–1846), U.S. Senator from Rhode Island 1805–07, Governor of Rhode Island 1807–11 1824–31 1843–45, delegate to the Rhode Island Constitutional Convention 1842. Son of Arthur Fenner.

== The Fenwicks, Livingstons, Stevens, and Alexanders ==
- John Stevens (1682–1737), Collector of Perth Amboy, New Jersey. Father of John Stevens.
  - John Stevens (1715/16–1792), Delegate to the Continental Congress from New Jersey 1783. Son of John Stevens.
    - Robert Livingston (1746–1813), U.S. Secretary of Foreign Affairs 1781–83, Chancellor of New York 1777–1801, candidate for Governor of New York 1798, U.S. Minister to France 1801–04. Son-in-law of John Stevens.
      - Millicent Fenwick (1910–1992), Bernardsville, New Jersey Councilwoman 1957–64; New Jersey Assemblywoman 1970–73; U.S. Representative from New Jersey 1975–83; candidate for U.S. Senate from New Jersey 1982; U.S. Ambassador to the United Nations Agencies for Food and Agriculture 1983–87. Great-great-great granddaughter of John Stevens.
      - Archibald S. Alexander, delegate to the Democratic National Convention 1948 1956, candidate for U.S. Senate from New Jersey 1948 1952. Great-great-great grandson of John Stevens.

NOTE: Robert Livingston was also a member of the Livingston family which includes several politicians, including Continental Congressional Delegate Philip Livingston and New Jersey Governor William Livingston. Millicent Fenwick was also daughter of New Jersey Assemblyman Ogden H. Hammond and sister of U.S. Vice Consul Ogden H. Hammond Jr.

== The Fergusons ==
- James Edward Ferguson aka Pa Ferguson (1871–1944), Governor of Texas, 1915–17; impeached by Texas House and removed from office; husband of Miriam Ferguson.
- Miriam Ferguson aka Ma Ferguson (1875–1961), Governor of Texas, 1925–27 and 1933–35.

== The Ferrys ==
- William Montague Ferry Jr. (1824–1905) was a Michigan and Utah politician and a Colonel in the Union Army during the American Civil War.
- Thomas W. Ferry (1827–1896) U.S. Senator from Michigan, served as Senate president pro tempore.
- W. Mont Ferry (1871–1938) He was a Utah State Senator and the 17th mayor of Salt Lake City.
- Zenas Ferry Moody (1832–1917) 7th Governor of Oregon.
- Henry Clay Hall (1860–1936) served as Chairman of the Interstate Commerce Commission from 1917 to 1918 and again in 1924. His Mother was a Ferry.
- Ednah Ferry, A delegate from Utah to the 1924 Republican National Convention.
- William H. Ferry (1819–1880) was president pro tempore of the New York State Senate.

== The Fessendens ==
- William P. Fessenden (1806–1869), congressman from Maine 1841–42, senator from Maine 1853–64 1865–69 United States Secretary of the Treasury 1864–65.
- Samuel C. Fessenden (1815–1882), congressman from Maine 1861–63.
- Thomas A. D. Fessenden (1826–1868), member of the Maine House of Representatives 1860–68, prosecuting attorney of Androscoggin County, Maine in 1861 and 1862, congressman from Maine 1862–63.

== The Fielders ==
- James F. Fielder, New Jersey Assemblyman 1871. Father of George Bragg Fielder.
  - George Bragg Fielder (1842–1906), Register of Hudson County, New Jersey; U.S. Representative from New Jersey 1893–95. Son of James F. Fielder.
  - William Brinkerhoff, New Jersey State Senator 1884–86. Brother-in-law of George Bragg Fielder.
    - James Fairman Fielder (1867–1954), New Jersey Assemblyman 1903–04, New Jersey State Senator 1908–13, acting Governor of New Jersey 1813, Governor of New Jersey 1814–17. Son of George Bragg Fielder.

== The Fields ==
- David Dudley Field (1805–1894), U.S. Representative from New York 1877. Brother of Stephen J. Field.
- Stephen J. Field (1816–1899), California Assemblyman 1850–51, Justice of the California Supreme Court 1857–63, Justice of the U.S. Supreme Court 1863–97. Brother of David Dudley Field.
  - David Josiah Brewer (1837–1910), County Judge in Kansas 1862–65, District Court Judge in Kansas 1865–69, Justice of the Kansas Supreme Court 1870–84, Judge of the U.S. Court of Appeals 1884–90, Justice of the U.S. Supreme Court 1890–1910. Nephew of Stephen J. Field.

== The Fieldses ==
- Harvey Fields, member of the Louisiana State Senate 1916–20; Louisiana Public Service Commission, 1927–36, U.S. Attorney for the Western District of Louisiana, 1937–41; briefly a law partner of Huey Pierce Long Jr.
  - T. T. Fields, member of the Louisiana House of Representatives, 1952–64, 1968–72; resident of Farmerville, son of Harvey Fields

== The Fifers ==
- Joseph W. Fifer (1840–1938), Illinois State Senator 1881–83, Governor of Illinois 1889–93. Father of Florence Fifer Bohrer.
  - Florence Fifer Bohrer, Illinois State Senator 1925–27.

== The Figureses ==
- Michael Figures (1947-1996) Member of the Alabama Senate 1978–1996; President pro tempore of the Alabama Senate 1995–1996. Husband of Vivian Davis Figures, father of Shomari Figures, and brother of Thomas Figures.
- Vivian Davis Figures (born 1957) Member of the Mobile City Council 1993–1997; Member of the Alabama Senate 1997–present. Wife of Michael Figures and mother of Shomari Figures.
  - Shomari Figures (born 1985) U.S. Representative from Alabama 2025–present. Son of Michael and Vivian Davis Figures, nephew of Thomas Figures.
- Thomas Figures (1944-2015) Assistant district attorney in Westchester County, New York; Assistant district attorney in Mobile County, Alabama; Assistant U.S. Attorney in the Southern District of Alabama; Municipal judge in Mobile, Alabama. Brother of Michael Figures and uncle of Shomari Figures.

== The Filleys ==
- Oliver Filley (1806–1881), Mayor of St. Louis, Missouri 1858–61. Cousin of Chauncey Filley.
  - Chauncey Filley (1829–1932), Mayor of St. Louis, Missouri 1863–64. Cousin of Oliver Filley.

== The Fillmores ==
- Calvin Fillmore (1775–1865), New York State Assemblyman 1825.
  - Millard Fillmore (1800–1874), U.S. Representative from New York 1833–35, 1837–43, Comptroller of New York 1848–49, Vice President 1849–50, President 1850–53, Know Nothing nominee for President 1856. Nephew of Calvin Fillmore.

== The Finches ==
- Robert L. Finch, Arizona State Representative. Father of Robert Finch.
  - Robert Finch (1925–1995), candidate for U.S. Representative from California 1952 1954, Lieutenant Governor of California 1967–69, U.S. Secretary of Health, Education, and Welfare 1969–70, candidate for Republican nomination for U.S. Senator from California 1976. Son of Robert L. Finch.

== The Finches and Housels ==
- Parley Finch (1844–1927), Iowa state representative 1894–98. Iowa state senator 1898–1902. Father-in-law of L. W. Housel.
  - L. W. Housel (1873–1935), Connecticut state representative 1901–1902. Son-in-law of Parley Finch.

== The Findlays ==
- John Findlay (1766–1838), Prothonotary in Pennsylvania 1809–21, Orphans' Court Clerk in Pennsylvania 1809–18, Clerk of the Court of Quarter Sessions in Pennsylvania 1809–18, U.S. Representative from Pennsylvania 1821–27, Postmaster of Chambersburg, Pennsylvania 1829–38. Brother of William Findlay and James Findlay.
- William Findlay (1768–1846), Treasurer of Pennsylvania 1807–17, Governor of Pennsylvania 1817–20, U.S. Senator from Pennsylvania 1821–27. Brother of John Findlay and James Findlay.
- James Findlay (1770–1835), member of the Northwest Territory Legislature 1798–1802, U.S. Receiver of Public Moneys of Cincinnati, Ohio 1800; U.S. Marshal of the Northwest Territory 1802; Mayor of Cincinnati, Ohio 1805–06 1810–11; U.S. Representative from Ohio 1825–33; candidate for Governor of Ohio 1834. Brother of John Findlay and William Findlay.

== The Finleys ==
- Hugh F. Finley (1833–1909), Kentucky State Representative 1861–62, Commonwealth Attorney in Kentucky, candidate for U.S. Representative from Kentucky 1870, Kentucky State Senator 1875–76, District Attorney of Kentucky 1876–77, Judge in Kentucky 1880–86, U.S. Representative from Kentucky 1887–91. Father of Charles Finley.
  - Charles Finley (1865–1941), Kentucky State Representative 1894–96, delegate to the Kentucky Republican Convention 1895, Kentucky Secretary of State 1896–1900, U.S. Representative from Kentucky 1930–33. Son of Hugh F. Finley.

== The Finleys and Harris ==
- Stephen Ross Harris (1824–1905), Mayor of Bucyrus, Ohio 1852–53 1861–62; U.S. Representative from Ohio 1895–97. Uncle of Ebenezer B. Finley.
  - Ebenezer B. Finley (1833–1916), U.S. Representative from Ohio 1877–81, Adjutant General of Ohio 1884, Circuit Court Judge in Ohio. Nephew of Stephen Ross Harris.

== The Fishes ==
See Fish family

== The Fishburnes, Mavericks, and Slaydens ==
- James Luther Slayden (1853–1924), Texas State Representative 1892, U.S. Representative from Texas 1897–1919. Uncle of Maury Maverick.
  - John W. Fishburne (1868–1937), member of the Virginia Legislature 1895, Virginia State Court Judge 1913, U.S. Representative from Virginia 1931–33. Cousin of Maury Maverick.
  - Maury Maverick (1895–1954), delegate to the Democratic National Convention 1928 1940, U.S. Representative from Texas 1935–39, Mayor of San Antonio, Texas 1939–41. Cousin of John W. Fishburne.
    - Maury Maverick Jr. (1921–2003), Texas State Representative 1950–56, candidate for Democratic nomination for U.S. Senate from Texas 1961. Son of Maury Maverick.

NOTE: Maury Maverick is also grandson of Texas State Representative Samuel A. Maverick and cousin of U.S. Representative Abram Poindexter Maury.

== The Fisks and Olmsteds ==
- James Fisk (1763–1844), member of the Massachusetts General Court 1785, Vermont State Representative 1800–05 1809–10 1815, Judge of the Orange County, Vermont Court 1802–09 1816; U.S. Representative from Vermont 1805–09 1811–15; Justice of the Vermont Supreme Court 1815–16; U.S. Senator from Vermont 1817–18; Collector of Customs of Vermont 1818–26. Grandfather-in-law of David Olmsted.
  - David Olmsted (1822–1861), delegate to the Iowa Constitutional Convention 1846, Mayor of St. Paul, Minnesota 1854–55. Grandson-in-law of James Fisk.

NOTE: David Olmsted was also brother of Minnesota Territory Representative S. Baldwin Olmstead.

== The Fitzgeralds ==
- John Wesley Fitzgerald (1850–1908), Michigan State Representative 1895–96. Father of Frank D. Fitzgerald.
  - Frank D. Fitzgerald (1885–1939), delegate to the Republican National Convention 1924 1932 1936, Michigan Republican State Central Committeeman 1925–26, Secretary of the Michigan Republican Party 1929–30, Michigan Secretary of State 1931–34, Governor of Michigan 1935–36 1939. Son of John Wesley Fitzgerald.
    - John Warner Fitzgerald (1924–2006), Michigan State Senator 1959–64, Judge of the Michigan Court of Appeals 1965–73, Justice of the Michigan Supreme Court 1974–82, Chief Justice of the Michigan Supreme Court 1982. Son of Frank D. Fitzgerald.
      - Frank M. Fitzgerald (1955–2004), Michigan State Representative 1987–96. Son of John Warner Fitzgerald.

== The Fitzgeralds, Gardners, Minots, and Pickerings ==
- Timothy Pickering (1745–1829), Essex County, Massachusetts Register of Deeds 1774–77; Massachusetts Colony Common Pleas Court Judge 1775; member of the Massachusetts Legislature 1776; delegate to the Pennsylvania Constitutional Convention 1789; Postmaster General of the United States 1791–95; U.S. Secretary of War 1795; U.S. Secretary of State 1795–1800; Common Pleas Court Judge in Massachusetts 1802–03; U.S. Senator from Massachusetts 1803–11; U.S. Representative from Massachusetts 1813–17; Massachusetts Governor's Councilman 1817–18. Great-great-grandfather of Augustus P. Gardner.
  - Augustus P. Gardner (1865–1918), Massachusetts State Senator 1900–01, U.S. Representative from Massachusetts 1902–17. Great-great-grandson of Timothy Pickering.
  - Susan W. Fitzgerald, Massachusetts State Representative 1923–24, delegate to the Democratic National Convention 1924. Descendant of Timothy Pickering.
    - William A.G. Minot (1916–1963), Connecticut State Representative 1959. Grand son of Augustus P. Gardner.

NOTE: Augustus P. Gardner was also son-in-law of U.S. Senator Henry Cabot Lodge and uncle by marriage of U.S. Senator Henry Cabot Lodge Jr. and U.S. Representative John Davis Lodge. William A.G. Minot was also great-great-great-great-grandson of U.S. Senator George Cabot and great-great-great-grandson of U.S. Senator Elijah Hunt Mills.

== The Fitzpatricks ==
- Mike Fitzpatrick (1963–2020), Member of the Bucks County Board of Commissioners 1995–2005, U.S. Pennsylvania's 8th congressional district from 2005 to 2007, 2011-2017.
- Brian Fitzpatrick (born 1973), U.S. Representative from Pennsylvania 2017–present. Brother of Mike Fitzpatrick.

== The Fitzpatricks, Elmores, and Lewis ==
- John Archer Elmore (1762–1834), member of the South Carolina Legislature, member of the Alabama Legislature. Father of Franklin Harper Elmore, Rush Elmore, Benjamin F. Elmore, and Albert Elmore.
  - Franklin Harper Elmore (1799–1850), U.S. Representative from South Carolina 1836–39, U.S. Senator from South Carolina 1850. Son of John Archer Elmore.
  - Rush Elmore (1819–1864), Justice of the Kansas Territory Supreme Court 1854–55 1858–61. Son of John Archer Elmore.
  - Benjamin F. Elmore, Treasurer of South Carolina. Son of John Archer Elmore.
  - Albert Elmore, Alabama Secretary of State 1865. Son of John Archer Elmore.
  - Benjamin Fitzpatrick (1802–1869), Governor of Alabama 1841–45, U.S. Senator from Alabama 1848–49 1853–55 1855–61. Son-in-law of John Archer Elmore.
  - Dixon Hall Lewis (1802–1848), Alabama State Representative 1926–1828, U.S. Representative from Alabama 1829–44, U.S. Senator from Alabama 1844–48. Son-in-law of John Archer Elmore.

NOTE: Dixon Hall Lewis was also nephew of U.S. Representative Bolling Hall.

== The Flakes ==
- Franklin L. Flake (1935–2008), Arizona State Representative, Arizona State Senator. Uncle of Jeffry Flake.
  - Jeff Flake (born 1962), U.S. Representative from Arizona 2001–2013, U.S. Senator from Arizona 2013–2019. Nephew of Franklin L. Flake.

== The Flanagans ==
- John J. Flanagan, Sr (died 1986) New York State Assemblyman 1973–86, father of John J, Flanagan Jr.
  - John J. Flanagan Jr (born 1961) New York State Assemblyman 1987–2002, New York State Senate 2003–Present, President of New York State Senate May 11, 2015 – present. Son of John J. Flanagan Sr.

== The Flanders and Hartness ==
- James Hartness (1861–1934), Governor of Vermont 1921–23. Father-in-law of Ralph Flanders.
  - Ralph Flanders (1880–1970), U.S. Senator from Vermont 1946–59. Son-in-law of James Hartness.

== The Flemings and Halls ==
- Ellery R. Hall (1834–1868), delegate to the Republican National Convention 1864 1868. Third cousin by marriage of Aretas B. Fleming.
- Aretas B. Fleming (1839–1923), Circuit Court Judge in West Virginia 1878, Governor of West Virginia 1890–93. Third cousin by marriage of Ellery R. Hall.
  - Frank Pierpont Hall, Mayor of Fairmont, West Virginia. Son of Ellery R. Hall.

== The Fletchers ==
- Betty Binns Fletcher (1923–2012), Judge of the United States Court of Appeals for the Ninth Circuit 1979–98.
  - William A. Fletcher (born 1945), Judge of the United States Court of Appeals for the Ninth Circuit 1998–present. Son of Betty Binns Fletcher.

== The Fletchers and Huddlestons ==
- Duncan U. Fletcher (1859–1936), Florida State Representative 1893, Mayor of Jacksonville, Florida 1893–95 1901–03; Duval County School Board Chairman 1900–1907; Chairman of the Florida Democratic Party 1905–08; U.S. Senator from Florida 1909–36. Uncle of John F. Huddleston.
  - John F. Huddleston (1892–1966), U.S. Consul in Milan, Italy 1924–29; U.S. Consul in Funchal, Madeira 1929–33; US Consul in Dresden, Germany 1933–39; U.S. Consul in Curacao, Netherlands Antilles 1940 – 1944; 1st Secty to Embassy & US Consul in Rome, Italy 1944–48; US Consul General in Liverpool, England 1948–52. Nephew of Duncan U. Fletcher.

== The Fletchers and McKinleys ==
- William McKinley (1843–1901), U.S. Representative from Ohio 1877–84 1885–91, delegate to the Republican National Convention 1888, Governor of Ohio 1892–96, President of the United States 1897–1901. Fourth cousin once removed of Henry P. Fletcher.
  - Henry P. Fletcher (1873–1959), U.S. Minister to Chile 1909–14, U.S. Minister to Luxembourg 1923–24, U.S. Ambassador to Chile 1914–16, U.S. Ambassador to Mexico 1916–19, U.S. Ambassador to Belgium 1922–24, U.S. Ambassador to Italy 1924–29, Chairman of the Republican National Committee 1934–36, delegate to the Republican National Convention 1940. Fourth cousin once removed of William McKinley.

== The Floyds ==
- John Floyd (1783–1837), Virginia House of Delegates 1814–15, U.S. Representative from Virginia 1817–29, Governor of Virginia 1830–34. Father of John B. Floyd and George Rogers Clark Floyd.
  - John B. Floyd (1806–1863), member of the Virginia House of Delegates 1847–49 1853, Governor of Virginia 1849–52, U.S. Secretary of War 1857–60. Son of John Floyd.
  - George Rogers Clark Floyd (1810–1895), Secretary of Wisconsin Territory 1843–46, West Virginia West Virginia House of Delegates 1872–73. Son of John Floyd.
  - Benjamin Rush Floyd (1811–1860), member of the Virginia House of Delegates (1847–1848), member of the Virginia Senate (1857–1858), brother of John B. Floyd
    - John B. Floyd (1854–1835), West Virginia House of Delegates 1881, 1893, West Virginia State Senator 1883–85. Son of George Rogers Clark Floyd.

== The Floyds of New York ==
- William Floyd (1734–1821), Delegate to the Continental Congress from New York 1774–76, New York State Senator 1784–88 1808, U.S. Representative from New York 1789–91, candidate for Lieutenant Governor of New York 1795, delegate to the New York Constitutional Convention 1801. Grandfather of John G. Floyd.
  - John G. Floyd (1806–1881), Clerk of Utica, New York 1829–33; Prosecuting Attorney of Utica, New York 1829–33; Judge of Suffolk County, New York; New York Assemblyman 1839–43; U.S. Representative from New York 1839–43 1851–53; New York State Senator 1848–49. Grandson of William Floyd.

== The Flynns ==
- John H. Flynn, candidate for Mayor of Glen Cove, New York 1905. Brother of Edward J. Flynn.
- Edward J. Flynn (1891–1953), New York Assemblyman 1918–21, Sheriff of Bronx County, New York 1922–25; Chairman of the Bronx County, New York Democratic Party 1922–40; delegate to the Democratic National Convention 1924 1928 1932 1936 1940 1944 1948 1952; Chamberlain of New York City 1926–28; New York Secretary of State 1929–39; New York Democratic Committeeman 1930; Chairman of the Democratic National Committee 1940–43; Leader of the Bronx County, New York Democratic Party 1941–53; Democratic National Committeeman 1944–45. Brother of John H. Flynn.

== The Flynts ==
- John James Flynt (1872–1949), Georgia 1900–06 1926 1933–35, Georgia State Senator 1907–08 1929–20 1937–38, Chairman of the Georgia Democratic Party 1916–21. Father of John James Flynt Jr.
  - John James Flynt Jr. (1914–2007), Georgia State Representative 1947–48, U.S. Representative from Georgia 1954–79. Son of John James Flynt.

== The Fogartys ==
- John E. Fogarty (1913–1967), U.S. Representative from Rhode Island 1941–44 1945–67, delegate to the Democratic National Convention 1948 1960. Brother of Charles Fogarty.
- Charles Fogarty, Rhode Island State Senator. Brother of John E. Fogarty.
  - Charles J. Fogarty (born 1955), Glocester, Rhode Island Councilman; Rhode Island State Senator 1990–98; Lieutenant Governor of Rhode Island 1998–2007; candidate for Governor of Rhode Island 2006. Son of Charles Fogarty.
  - Paul Fogarty, Rhode Island State Senator 1998–present. Son of Charles Fogarty.
  - Ray Fogarty (1957–2018), Glocester, Rhode Island Councilman; Rhode Island State Representative 1983–92. Nephew of John E. Fogarty.

== The Foleys ==
- John R. Foley (1890–1954), delegate to the Democratic National Convention 1928. Father of John R. Foley, Daniel F. Foley, and Patrick J. Foley.
  - John R. Foley (1917–2001), Orphans' Court Judge in Montgomery County, Maryland 1954–58; candidate for U.S. Representative from Maryland 1956; U.S. Representative from Maryland 1959–61. Son of John R. Foley.
  - Daniel F. Foley (1921–2002), District Court Judge in Minnesota 1966–82. Son of John R. Foley.
  - Patrick J. Foley, U.S. Attorney of Minnesota 1966–69. Son of John R. Foley.

== The Foleys of Nevada ==
- Roger Thomas Foley (1886–1974), Judge of the United States District Court for the District of Nevada 1945–57.
  - Roger D. Foley (1917–1996), Judge of the United States District Court for the District of Nevada 1962–82. Son of Roger Thomas Foley.
- Joseph M. Foley, Nevada State Senate
- Helen Foley, Nevada Senate and the Nevada Assembly, daughter of Joseph M. Foley.

== The Folgers ==
- John Hamlin Folger (1880–1963), Mayor of Mount Airy, North Carolina 1908–12; North Carolina State Representative 1927–28; North Carolina State Senator 1931–32; delegate to the Democratic National Convention 1932 1944; U.S. Representative from North Carolina 1941–49. Brother of Alonzo Dillard Folger.
- Alonzo Dillard Folger (1888–1941), Democratic National Committeeman 1936–41, Judge of the North Carolina Superior Court 1937, U.S. Representative from North Carolina 1939–41. Brother of John Hamlin Folger.
  - Fred Folger, North Carolina State Senator 1935–36 1039–1940 1959. Son of John Hamlin Folger.

== The Folkeses ==
- Cheston Folkes, Democratic member of the Louisiana House of Representatives from West Feliciana Parish 1908–20 1924–32 1936–40, father of Warren Davis Folkes.
  - Warren Davis Folkes, Democratic member of the Louisiana House from West Feliciana Parish 1944–55 1968–76; member of the Louisiana State Senate 1955–68, son of Cheston Folkes; farmer in St. Francisville.

== The Folsoms and Wallaces of Alabama ==
- James E. Folsom Sr. (1908–1987), delegate to the Democratic National Convention 1944, Governor of Alabama 1947–51 1955–59. Father of James E. Folsom Jr.
  - James E. Folsom Jr. (born 1948), candidate for U.S. Senate from Alabama 1980, Lieutenant Governor of Alabama 1987–93 2007–present, Governor of Alabama 1993–95. Son of James E. Folsom Sr.
  - George C. Wallace (1919–1998), Alabama State Representative 1947–53, delegate to the Democratic National Convention 1956, Alabama Circuit Court Judge 1953–58, candidate for Democratic nomination for President of the United States 1958, Governor of Alabama 1963–67 1971–72 1972–79 1983–87, candidate for Democratic nomination for President of the United States 1964 1972 1976, candidate for President of the United States 1968. Nephew by marriage of James E. Folsom Sr. Husband of Lurleen Wallace. Father of George Wallace Jr.
  - Lurleen Wallace (1926–1968), Governor of Alabama 1967–68. Wife of George C. Wallace. Mother of George Wallace Jr.
    - George Wallace Jr. (born 1951), Alabama State Treasurer 1987–1995. Son of George Wallace and Lurleen Wallace.

== The Footes ==
- George M. Foote (1919–2010), city judge in Alexandria, Louisiana, 1955–85, father of W. Ross Foote and father-in-law of Elizabeth Erny Foote
  - W. Ross Foote (born 1953), judge of the 9th Judicial District in Alexandria, Louisiana 1991–2004, son of George M. Foote and husband of Elizabeth Erny Foote
  - Elizabeth Erny Foote (born 1953), judge of the United States District Court for the Western District of Louisiana in Alexandria, since 2010, wife of W. Ross Foote and daughter-in-law of George M. Foote

== The Fords ==
- Gerald Ford (1913–2006), U.S. Representative from Michigan 1949–73, Vice President of the United States 1973–74, President of the United States 1974–77. Brother of Thomas Ford.
  - John G. Ford (born 1952), delegate to multiple Republican National Conventions, executive director of the 1996 Republican National Convention. Son of Gerald Ford.
- Thomas Gardner Ford (1918–1995), Michigan State Representative 1965–72. Half-brother of Gerald Ford.

== The Fords and Forquers ==
- George Forquer (1794–1837), Illinois State Senator, Illinois Secretary of State 1825–28, Attorney General of Illinois 1829–32. Brother of Thomas Ford.
- Thomas Ford (1800–1850), Illinois State Attorney, Illinois State Judge, Justice of the Illinois Supreme Court 1841–42, Governor of Illinois 1842–46. Brother of George Forquer.

== The Fords of Kentucky ==
- E.H. Ford, Kentucky State Senator. Father of Wendell H. Ford.
  - Wendell H. Ford (1924–2015), Kentucky State Senator 1965–67, Lieutenant Governor of Kentucky 1967–71, Governor of Kentucky 1971–74, U.S. Senator from Kentucky 1974–99. Son of E.H. Ford.

== The Fords of New Hampshire ==
- Oliver Ford, New Hampshire state representative
  - Mary Ford, New Hampshire state representative. Wife of Oliver Ford.

== The Fords of Tennessee ==
- Newton Ford, candidate for Tennessee State Representative 1966, candidate for Tennessee Assemblyman 1968. Father of Harold Ford Sr.; Edmund Ford; John N. Ford; Ophelia Ford; Joe Ford; Emmitt Ford; and James Ford.
  - Harold Ford Sr. (born 1945), Tennessee legislator, US Representative, Tennessee, 1975–97
    - Harold Ford Jr. (born 1970), US Representative, Tennessee, 1997–2007, failed US Senate candidate, 2006; son of Harold Sr.
    - Jake Ford (born 1972), failed US Representative candidate, 2006; son of Harold Sr.
    - Sir Isaac Ford, candidate for Mayor of Shelby County, Tennessee 2002. Son of Harold Ford Sr.
  - Edmund Ford Memphis city councilman; brother of Harold Sr.
    - Edmund Ford Jr., Memphis, Tennessee Councilman. Son of Edmund Ford.
  - John N. Ford (born 1942), Tennessee State Senator; brother of Harold Sr.
  - Ophelia Ford (born 1950), Tennessee State Senator; sister of Harold Sr.
  - Joe Ford, candidate for Mayor of Memphis, Tennessee 1999; Commissioner of Shelby County, Tennessee. Brother of Harold Ford Sr.; Edmund Ford; John N. Ford; and Ophelia Ford.
    - Joe Ford Jr., candidate for the Democratic nomination for U.S. Representative from Tennessee 2006. Son of Joe Ford.
    - Justin Ford, Shelby County Commissioner. Son of Joe Ford.
  - Emmitt Ford, Tennessee State Representative. Son of Newton Ford.
  - James Ford, Memphis, Tennessee Councilman; Commissioner of Shelby County, Tennessee. Son of Newton Ford.

Note: The Fords are not related to President Gerald Ford, who was born Leslie King and renamed after his stepfather Gerald Ford Sr.

== The Forneys ==
- Peter Forney (1756–1834), member of the North Carolina House of Commons 1794–96, North Carolina State Senator 1801–02, U.S. Representative from North Carolina 1813–15. Father of Daniel Munroe Forney.
  - Daniel Munroe Forney (1784–1847), U.S. Representative from North Carolina 1815–18, North Carolina State Senator 1823–26. Son of Peter Forney.
    - William H. Forney (1823–1894), Alabama State Representative 1859–60, Alabama State Senator 1855–56, U.S. Representative from Alabama 1875–93. Grandson of Peter Forney.

== The Forsyths ==
- John Forsyth (1780–1841), Attorney General of Georgia 1808, U.S. Representative from Georgia 1813–18 1823–27, U.S. Senator from Georgia 1818–19 1829–34, U.S. Minister to Spain 1819–23, Governor of Georgia 1827–29, U.S. Secretary of State 1834–41. Father of John Forsyth Jr.
  - John Forsyth Jr. (1812–1877), U.S. Minister to Mexico 1856–58, member of the Alabama Legislature 1859, Mayor of Mobile, Alabama 1861 1865. Son of John Forsyth.

== The Forts and Wrights ==
- Samuel G. Wright (1781–1845), U.S. Representative from New Jersey 1845. Father-in-law of George F. Fort.
  - George F. Fort (1809–1872), delegate to the New Jersey Constitutional Convention 1844, New Jersey Assemblyman, New Jersey State Senator, Governor of New Jersey 1851–54, Judge in New Jersey. Son-in-law of Samuel G. Wright.
    - John Franklin Fort (1852–1920), delegate to the Republican National Convention 1884 1896 1912, Justice of the New Jersey Supreme Court, Governor of New Jersey 1908–11, Federal Trade Commission 1917–19. Nephew of George F. Fort.
      - Franklin W. Fort (1880–1937), U.S. Representative from New Jersey 1925–31, delegate to the Republican National Convention 1928. Son of John Franklin Fort.

== The Forwards ==
- Walter Forward (1786–1852), Pennsylvania Assemblyman, U.S. Representative from Pennsylvania 1822–25, delegate to the Pennsylvania Constitutional Convention 1837, U.S. Secretary of the Treasury 1841–43, U.S. Chargé d'Affaires to Denmark 1850–51, Judge of the Allegheny County, Pennsylvania District Court. Brother of Chauncey Forward.
- Chauncey Forward (1793–1839), Pennsylvania State Representative 1820–22, U.S. Representative from Pennsylvania 1826–33. Brother of Walter Forward.

== The Fossellas ==
- Frank Fossella (1925–2014) New York City Council 1st District 1985, first Vice Chairman of Staten Island Democratic Party 1985–86. Uncle of Vito Fossella.
  - Vito Fossella (Born 1965) Congressman from New York's 13th District 1997–2009, New York City Council 51st District 1994–97. Nephew of Frank Fossella.

== The Fosters ==
- Theodore Foster (1752–1828), U.S. Senator from Rhode Island 1790–1803. Brother of Dwight Foster.
- Dwight Foster (1757–1823), Justice of the Peace of Worcester County, Massachusetts 1781–1823; Justice of the Court of Common Pleas in Massachusetts 1792; Sheriff of Worcester County, Massachusetts 1792; Massachusetts State Representative 1791–92 1808–09; U.S. Representative from Massachusetts 1793–99; U.S. Senator from Massachusetts 1800–03; Chief Justice of the Court of Common Pleas in Massachusetts 1801–11; Governor's Councilman in Massachusetts. Brother of Theodore Foster.
  - Alfred Dwight Foster (1800–1852), member of the Massachusetts State Representative. Son of Dwight Foster.
    - Dwight Foster (1828–1884), Attorney General of Massachusetts 1861–64, Justice of the Massachusetts Supreme Court 1866–69. Son of Alfred Dwight Foster.

NOTE: Dwight Foster was also son-in-law of U.S. Senator Roger Sherman Baldwin.

== The Fosters of Alaska ==
- Neal W. "Willie" Foster (1916–1979), Alaska Territorial Senator 1955–59, Alaska State Senator 1963–67. Father of Richard Foster
  - Richard Foster (1946–2009), Alaska State Representative 1989–2009. Son of Willie Foster. Father of Neal Foster
    - Neal W. Foster (born 1972), Alaska State Representative 2009–. Son of Richard Foster

== The Fosters of Tennessee ==
- Robert Coleman Foster (1769–1844), Tennessee State Representative 1803–07, Tennessee State Senator 1809–15 1825–27, candidate for Governor of Tennessee 1815 1817. Father of Ephraim H. Hubbard and Robert Coleman Foster Jr.
  - Ephraim H. Foster (1794–1854), Tennessee State Representative 1829–31 1835–37, U.S. Senator from Tennessee 1838–39 1843–45, candidate for Governor of Tennessee 1845. Son of Robert Coleman Foster.
  - Robert Coleman Foster Jr., Tennessee State Representative 1829–31 1833–35 1839–41, Tennessee State Senator 1841–43. Son of Robert Coleman Foster.
    - Edward S. Cheatham (1818–1878), Tennessee State Representative 1853–55, Tennessee State Senator 1855–57 1861–63. Son-in-law of Ephraim H. Foster.

NOTE: Edward S. Cheatham was also son of U.S. Representative Richard Cheatham, nephew of Tennessee State Representative Anderson Cheatham, and brother Tennessee State Representative Richard Boone Cheatham and Tennessee Legislator Boyd M. Cheatham.

== The Fosters, Sanderses Roberts, and Goodwills of Louisiana ==
- Murphy James Foster, I (1849–1921), Louisiana State Senator 1880–92, Governor of Louisiana 1892–1900, U.S. Senator from Louisiana 1901–13. Cousin of Jared Young Sanders.
- Jared Young Sanders (1869–1944), Louisiana State Representative 1892–1904, delegate to the Louisiana Constitutional Convention 1898 1921, Lieutenant Governor of Louisiana 1904–08, Governor of Louisiana 1908–12, U.S. Representative from Louisiana 1917–21, candidate for U.S. Senate from Louisiana 1920 1926. Cousin of Murphy J. Foster Sr.
- Robert Roberts Jr. (born 1892; date of death missing), mayors of Farmerville and Minden, Louisiana, member of the Louisiana House of Representatives 1908–14, state district court judge for Bossier and Webster parishes 1920–25, maternal grandfather of Murphy J. Foster Jr.
  - Jared Y. Sanders Jr. (1892–1960), member of the Louisiana Legislature, U.S. Representative from Louisiana 1934–37 1941–43, delegate to the Democratic National Convention 1940 1944. Son of Jared Young Sanders.
    - Murphy James Foster Jr. (actually Murphy III) (1930–2020), Louisiana State Senator, Governor of Louisiana 1996–2004. Grandson of Murphy J. Foster.

== The Fosses ==
- Eugene Foss (1858–1939), U.S. Representative from Massachusetts 1910–11, Governor of Massachusetts 1911–13. Brother of George E. Foss.
- George E. Foss (1863–1936), U.S. Representative from Illinois 1895–1913 1915–19, candidate for U.S. Senate from Illinois 1918. Brother of Eugene Foss.

== The Fossellas and O'Learys ==
- James A. O'Leary (1889–1944), candidate for New York State Senate 1930, U.S. Representative from New York 1935–44. Great-grandfather of Vito Fossella.
  - Vito Fossella (born 1965), New York City Councilman 1994–97, U.S. Representative from New York 1997–2009. Great-grandson of James A. O'Leary.

== The Fowlers ==
- Samuel Fowler (1779–1844), New Jersey Councilman, U.S. Representative from New Jersey 1833–37. Grandfather of Samuel Fowler.
  - Samuel Fowler (1851–1919), U.S. Representative from New Jersey 1889–93. Grandson of Samuel Fowler.

== The Fowlers and Kidds ==
- Culver Kidd Jr. (1914–1995), Georgia State Representative 1947–53 1957–63, Georgia State Senator 1963–91. Father of Tillie K. Fowler.
  - Tillie K. Fowler (1942–2005), Jacksonville, Florida Councilwoman 1986–92; U.S. Representative from Florida 1992–2001; delegate to the Republican National Convention 2004. Daughter of Culver Kidd Jr.
  - Rusty Kidd (1946–2020), Georgia State Representative 2009–17. Son of Culver Kidd Jr.

== The Fowlers of Louisiana ==
- Douglas Fowler (1906–1980), Louisiana Elections Commissioner 1959–79, clerk of court of Red River Parish, Louisiana 1940–52, father of Jerry Fowler and brother of H. M. Fowler
  - Jerry Fowler (1940–2009), Louisiana Elections Commissioner 1980–2000, former professional football player, son of Douglas Fowler and nephew of H. M. Fowler
- H. M. Fowler (1918–2014), member of the Louisiana House of Representatives 1972–86, known as "Mutt" Fowler, brother of Douglas Fowler and uncle of Jerry Fowler

== The Franchots ==
- Richard Franchot (1816–1875), U.S. Representative from New York 1861–63. Father of Stanislaus P. Franchot and N. V. V. Franchot.
  - Stanislaus P. Franchot (1851–1908), New York State Senator 1907–08. Son of Richard Franchot.
    - Edward E. Franchot (1881–1950), delegate to the New York Constitutional Convention 1915. Son of Stanislaus P. Franchot.
    - Nicholas V. V. Franchot II (1884–1938), New York Assemblyman 1918–19 1921. Son of Stanislaus P. Franchot
  - N. V. V. Franchot (1855–1943), delegate to the Republican National Convention 1892 1904, Mayor of Olean, New York 1894–98. Son of Richard Franchot.
      - Peter Franchot (born 1947), Maryland State Delegate 1987–2007, Comptroller of Maryland 2007–2023. Great-grandson of Richard Franchot.

== The Francis ==
- John M. Francis (1823–1897), U.S. Minister to Greece 1871–73, U.S. Minister to Portugal 1882–84, U.S. Minister to Austria-Hungary 1884–85, delegate to the New York Constitutional Convention 1894. Father of Charles S. Francis.
  - Charles Spencer Francis (1853–1911), U.S. Minister to Greece 1901–02, U.S. Minister to Romania 1901–02, U.S. Minister to Serbia 1901–02, U.S. Ambassador to Austria-Hungary 1906–10. Son of John M. Francis.

== The Francises and Earicksons ==
- James Earickson (1782–1844), Missouri State Senator 1828–29, Missouri State Senator 1829–33. Grandfather-in-law of David R. Francis.
  - David R. Francis (1850–1927), Mayor of St. Louis, Missouri 1885–89; Governor of Missouri 1889–93; U.S. Secretary of the Interior 1896–97; U.S. Ambassador to Russia 1916–17. Grandson-in-law of James Earickson.

== The Franks and Lewis ==
- Ann Lewis (born 1937), Democratic National Committeewoman. Sister of Barney Frank.
- Barney Frank (1940–2026), Massachusetts State Representative 1973–80, U.S. Representative from Massachusetts 1981–2013, delegate to the Democratic National Convention 2000 2004 2008. Brother of Ann Lewis.

== The Franks and Pattersons ==
- William Patterson (1789–1838), U.S. Representative from New York 1837–38. Brother of George Washington Patterson.
- George Washington Patterson (1799–1879), Justice of the Peace in New York, New York Assemblyman 1832–33 1835–40, delegate to the New York Constitutional Convention 1846, Lieutenant Governor of New York 1849–50, delegate to the Republican National Convention 1856 1860, U.S. Representative from New York 1877–79. Brother of William Patterson.
  - Augustus Frank (1826–1895), delegate to the Republican National Convention 1856, U.S. Representative from New York 1859–65, delegate to the New York Constitutional Convention 1867 1868 1894. Nephew of William Patterson and George Washington Patterson.

== The Franklins ==
- Jesse Franklin (1760–1823), member of the North Carolina House of Commons 1793–94 1797–98, North Carolina State Senator 1805–06, U.S Representative from North Carolina 1795–97, U.S. Senator from North Carolina 1799–1805 1807–13, Governor of North Carolina 1820–21. Brother of Meshack Franklin.
- Meshack Franklin (1772–1839), member of the North Carolina House of Commons 1800–01, U.S. Representative from North Carolina 1807–15, North Carolina State Senator 1828–29 1838. Brother of Jesse Franklin.

== The Franklins of Arizona ==
- Benjamin Joseph Franklin (1839–1898), Kansas State Senator 1860, U.S. Representative from Missouri 1875–79, U.S. Consul in Hankow, China 1885–90; Governor of Arizona Territory 1896–97. Father of Alfred Franklin.
  - Alfred Franklin, delegate to the Arizona Constitutional Convention 1910, Chief Justice of the Arizona Supreme Court 1912–18. Son of Benjamin Joseph Franklin.

== The Franklins, Baches and Davenports ==
- Benjamin Franklin (1706–1790), Delegate to the Continental Congress from Pennsylvania 1775, delegate to the Pennsylvania Constitutional Convention 1776, U.S. Minister to France 1778–85, President of Pennsylvania 1785, delegate to the Philadelphia Convention. Father of William Franklin.
  - William Franklin (1731–1813), Governor of New Jersey Colony 1763–76. Son of Benjamin Franklin.
  - Richard Bache (1737–1811), United States Postmaster General. Son-in-law of Benjamin Franklin.
    - Richard Bache Jr. (1784–1848), assisted in drafting the Texas Constitution of 1845. Grandson of Benjamin Franklin.
  - Franklin Davenport (1755–1832), member of the New Jersey Legislature, U.S. Senator from New Jersey 1798–99, U.S. Representative from New Jersey 1799–1801. Nephew of Benjamin Franklin.
    - Benjamin Tappan (1773–1857), Ohio State Senator 1803–04, President Judge of the Ohio Court of Common Pleas for the 5th Judicial Circuit 1816–23, Judge of the United States District Court for the District of Ohio 1833–34, U.S. Senator from Ohio 1839–45. Great-grandnephew of Benjamin Franklin.
    - John C. Wright (1783–1861), Justice of the Ohio Supreme Court 1831–35, U.S. Representative from Ohio 1823–29. Brother-in-law of John C. Wright.

== The Fraziers ==
- James B. Frazier (1856–1937), Governor of Tennessee 1903–05, U.S. Senator from Tennessee 1905–11. Father of James B. Frazier Jr.
  - James B. Frazier Jr. (1890–1978), U.S. Attorney in Tennessee 1933–48, U.S. Representative from Tennessee 1948–63. Son of James B. Frazier.

== The Freehafers and McClures ==
- A.L. Freehafer (1868–1940), Idaho State Representative 1906, Idaho State Senator 1908, candidate for Governor of Idaho 1924, delegate to the Democratic National Convention 1936. Grandfather of James A. McClure.
  - James A. McClure (1924–2011), Idaho State Senator 1960–67, U.S. Representative from Idaho 1967–73, U.S. Senator from Idaho 1973–91, delegate to the Republican National Convention 1988. Grandson of A.L. Freehafer.

== The Freemans ==
- Orville Freeman (1918–2003), Governor of Minnesota 1955–61, U.S. Secretary of Agriculture 1961–69. Father of Michael O. Freeman.
  - Michael O. Freeman (born 1948), Minnesota State Senator 1983–91, County Attorney for Hennepin County, Minnesota 1991–99 2006–present, candidate for Democratic nominations for Governor of Minnesota, 1994 and 1998. Son of Orville Freeman.

== The Freemans of Massachusetts and New Hampshire ==
- Jonathan Freeman (1745–1808), Clerk of Hanover, New Hampshire; Justice of the Peace in New Hampshire; New Hampshire State Representative 1787–89; New Hampshire State Senator 1789–94; delegate to the New Hampshire Constitutional Convention 1791; U.S. Representative from New Hampshire 1797–1801. Uncle of Nathaniel Freeman Jr.
  - Nathaniel Freeman Jr. (1766–1800), U.S. Representative from Massachusetts 1795–99. Nephew of Jonathan Freeman.

== The Freeses and McLevys ==
- Jasper McLevy (1878–1962), candidate for Mayor of Bridgeport, Connecticut 1911 1931; candidate for U.S. Representative from Connecticut 1920; Mayor of Bridgeport, Connecticut 1933–57; candidate for Governor of Connecticut 1938; candidate for U.S. Senate from Connecticut 1952. Uncle by marriage of Irving C. Freese.
  - Irving Freese (1903–1964), candidate for Mayor of Norwalk, Connecticut 1939 1941 1943 1945; candidate for Connecticut State Representative 1946; Mayor of Norwalk, Connecticut 1947–54. Nephew by marriage of Jasper McLevy.

== The Frelinghuysens ==
- Frederick Frelinghuysen (1753–1804), New Jersey delegate to Continental Congress, 1778; U.S. Senator from New Jersey, 1793–1796.
  - John Frelinghuysen (1776–1833), State Senator and Congressional candidate; son of Frederick
  - Theodore Frelinghuysen (1787–1862), U.S. Senator from New Jersey, 1829–1835; candidate for Vice President of the United States, 1844; son of Frederick.
    - Frederick T. Frelinghuysen (1817–1885), U.S. Senator from New Jersey, 1866–1869 and 1871–1877; United States Secretary of State, 1881–1885; nephew of Theodore.
      - Joseph S. Frelinghuysen (1869–1948), U.S. Senator from New Jersey, 1917–1923; nephew of Frederick T.
        - Peter Frelinghuysen Jr. (1916–2011), U.S. Representative from New Jersey, 1953–1975; great-great-great-grandson of Frederick.
          - Rodney Frelinghuysen (born 1946), U.S. Congressman from New Jersey, 1995–2019; son of Peter Jr.; Chairman of the United States House Committee on Appropriations (2017–2019)

In addition, Theodore Frelinghuysen Singiser (1845-1907), Secretary of the Utah Territory 1880, Acting Governor of the Utah Territory 1881–1882, Delegate to the House of Representatives from the Utah Territory (1883–1885), was a distant cousin.

NOTE: Frederick T. Frelinghuysen's descendants married into the Davis political family and the Lodge family and he is the great-grandfather of Massachusetts Senator Henry Cabot Lodge Jr. and Connecticut Governor John Davis Lodge.

== The Frenches and Hotchkiss ==
- Carlos French (1835–1903), Connecticut State Representative 1860 1868, Democratic National Committeeman, U.S. Representative from Connecticut 1887–89, delegate to the Democratic National Convention 1892. Third cousin twice removed of James L. Hotchkiss.
  - James L. Hotchkiss (1857–1930), delegate to the Republican National Convention 1908 1912 1916 1924, Chairman of the Monroe County, New York Republican Party 1920–27. Third cousin twice removed of Carlos French.
  - Raymond T. French (1864–1934), Connecticut State Senator 1919–20. Son of Carlos French.

== The Frenches and Mortons ==
- Marcus Morton (1784–1864), U.S. Representative from Massachusetts 1817–21, Massachusetts Governor's Councilman 1823, Lieutenant Governor of Massachusetts 1824–25, acting Governor of Massachusetts 1825, Justice of the Massachusetts Supreme Court 1825–40, Governor of Massachusetts 1840–41 1843–44, Collector of the Port of Boston, Massachusetts 1845–49; delegate to the Massachusetts Constitutional Convention 1853; Massachusetts State Representative 1858. Father of Marcus Morton.
  - Marcus Morton (1819–1891), delegate to the Massachusetts Constitutional Convention 1853, Massachusetts State Representative 1858, Judge of the Suffolk County, Massachusetts; Judge of the Massachusetts Superior Court; Justice of the Massachusetts Supreme Court 1869–82; Chief Justice of the Massachusetts Supreme Court 1882–90. Son of Marcus Morton.
    - George W. French (1858–1934), delegate to the Republican National Convention 1896 1900 1904 1912. Nephew of Marcus Morton.

== The Freudenthals ==
- Dave Freudenthal (born 1950), United States Attorney for the District of Wyoming 1994–2001, Governor of Wyoming 2003–11.
- Nancy D. Freudenthal (born 1954), Judge of the United States District Court for the District of Wyoming 2010–present. Wife of Dave Freudenthal.

== The Friedmans ==
- J. Isaac Friedman, member of the Louisiana House of Representatives 1908–16 and the Louisiana State Senate 1922–24, from Natchitoches Parish; brother of Leon Friedman and uncle of Sylvan Friedman
- Leon Friedman, member of the Louisiana House of Representatives 1932–40, brother of J. Isaac Friedman and uncle of Sylvan Friedman
  - Sylvan Friedman, member of the Louisiana House from Natchitoches Parish 1944–52; represented Natchitoches and Red River parishes in the state Senate 1952–72; confidant of Earl Kemp Long, nephew of J. Isaac Friedman and Leon Friedman

== The Fryes ==
- John March Frye, member of the Maine State Senate, member of the Maine Governor's Council.
  - William P. Frye (1830–1911), United States Senator from Maine, son of John March Frye.
    - Wallace H. White Jr. (1877–1952), United States Senator from Maine, grandson of William P. Frye.

== The Fullers and Wallaces ==
- Nathan Weston (1782–1872), Justice of the Maine Supreme Judicial Court 1820–41. Grandfather of Melville W. Fuller.
  - Melville W. Fuller (1833–1910), delegate to the Illinois Constitutional Convention 1862, Illinois State Representative 1863, delegate to the Democratic National Convention 1876, Chief Justice of the U.S. Supreme Court 1888–1910. Father-in-law of Hugh Campbell Wallace.
    - Hugh Campbell Wallace (1863–1931), Democratic National Committeeman 1892–96 1916–20, delegate to the Democratic National Convention 1896 1912, U.S. Ambassador to France 1919–21. Son-in-law of Melville W. Fuller.

== The Fullertons and Robisons ==
- David Fullerton (1772–1843), U.S. Representative from Pennsylvania 1819–20, Pennsylvania State Senator 1827–39. Uncle of David Fullerton Robison.
  - David Fullerton Robison (1816–1859), U.S. Representative from Pennsylvania 1855–57. Nephew of David Fullerton.

== The Fulmers ==
- Hampton P. Fulmer (1875–1944), South Carolina State Representative, 1917–20, U.S. Representative from South Carolina, 1921–44.
- Willa L. Fulmer (1884–1968), U.S. Representative from South Carolina, 1932–33. Wife of Hampton P. Fulmer.

== The Fultons ==
- Charles William Fulton (1853–1918), Oregon State Senator, Attorney of Astoria, Oregon 1880–82; U.S. Representative from Oregon 1903–09. Brother of Elmer L. Fulton.
- Elmer L. Fulton (1865–1939), U.S. Representative from Oklahoma 1907–09. Brother of Charles William Fulton.

== The Fultons of Virginia ==
- John H. Fulton (1792–1836), member of the Virginia Legislature 1823, Virginia State Senator 1829, U.S. Representative from Virginia 1833–35. Brother of Andrew S. Fulton.
- Andrew S. Fulton (1800–1884), member of the Virginia Legislature 1840, U.S. Representative from Virginia 1847–49, Virginia State Court Judge 1852. Brother of John H. Fulton.

== The Funks ==
- Isaac Funk (1797–1865), Illinois State Representative 1840–42, Illinois State Senator 1862–66. Father of Benjamin F., George W., Duncan McArthur, and LaFayette Funk.
  - Benjamin F. Funk (1838–1909), Mayor of Bloomington, Illinois 1871–76 1884–86; delegate to the Republican National Convention 1888; U.S. Representative from Illinois 1893–95. Son of Isaac Funk.
    - Franklin H. Funk (1869–1940), member of the Illinois Republican Committee 1906–12, Illinois State Senator 1909–11, delegate to the Progressive Party National Convention 1912 1916, candidate for U.S. Senate from Illinois 1913, delegate to the Republican National Convention 1920, U.S. Representative from Illinois 1921–27. Son of Benjamin F. Funk.
  - George W. Funk (1827–1911), Illinois State Representative 1870–72
  - Duncan McArthur Funk (1832–1911), Illinois State Representative 1896–1902
  - LaFayette Funk (1836–1919), Illinois State Representative 1882–84, Illinois State Senator 1884–88
