= Senator Funk =

Senator Funk may refer to:

- Frank H. Funk (1869–1940), Illinois State Senate
- Isaac Funk (1797–1865), Illinois State Senate
- John B. Funk (1905–1993), Maryland State Senate
- LaFayette Funk (1834–1919), Illinois State Senate

== See also ==
- Rich Funke (born 1949), New York State Senate
