= List of mayors of Malden, Massachusetts =

The mayor of Malden, Massachusetts is the chief executive officer of the government of Malden as set in the city charter. The current officeholder, the 37th in the sequence of regular mayors, is Gary Christenson, a member of the Democratic Party.

#	Image	Mayor	Term start	Term end	Length of service	Party
ONE YEAR MAYORAL TERM (Ch. 169 of the Acts of 1881)
1		Elisha S. Converse (1820–1904)	January 1, 1882	January 1, 1883	1 year	Republican
2		John K.C. Sleeper (1828–1893)	January 1, 1883	January 1, 1884	1 year	Republican
3		Lorin L. Fuller (1826–1895)	January 7, 1884	January 1, 1886	2 years	Democrat
4		Marcellus Coggan (1847–1925)	January 1, 1886	January 1, 1888	2 years	Independent
5		Joseph F. Wiggin (1838–1906)	January 2, 1888	January 1, 1892	4 years	Democrat / Citizens (1890)
6		James Pierce (1837–1904)	January 1, 1892	January 1, 1893	1 year	Republican
7		Henry Winn (1838–1916)	January 2, 1893	January 1, 1894	1 year	Independent
8		Everett J. Stevens (1859–1952)	January 1, 1894	January 6, 1896	2 years	Citizens
9		Clarence O. Walker (1848–1911)	January 6, 1896	January 1, 1897	1 year	Republican
10		John E. Farnham (1862–1904)	January 4, 1897	January 2, 1899	2 years	Independent
11		Charles L. Dean (1844–1909)	January 2, 1899	January 2, 1905	6 years	Republican
12		William A. Hastings (1868–1950)	January 2, 1905	January 1, 1906	1 year	Citizens
13		Charles G. Warren (1856–1919)	January 1, 1906	January 7, 1907	1 year	Republican
14		Charles D. McCarthy (1860–1920)	January 7, 1907	January 6, 1908	1 year	Citizens
15		George L. Richards (1860–1932)	January 6, 1908	January 3, 1910	2 years	Republican
16		George H. Fall (1858–1937)	January 3, 1910	January 1, 1912	2 years	Republican
17		George L. Farrell (1866/67–1913)	January 1, 1912	January 1, 1913^{[a]}	1 year	Republican
—		Charles L. Moore^{[b]}	January 1, 1913	February 25, 1913	2 months	
18		Charles Schumaker (1867–1921)	February 25, 1913	January 4, 1915	1 year, 11 months	Democrat
19		William M. Blakeley (d. 1932)	January 4, 1915	January 3, 1916	1 year	
20		Charles M. Blodgett	January 3, 1916	January 5, 1920	4 years	
21		John V. Kimball	January 5, 1920	January 5, 1925	5 years	
22		John D. Devir	January 5, 1925	January 6, 1930	5 years	
23		William A. Hastings (1868–1950)	January 6, 1930	January 2, 1933	3 years	Republican
TWO YEAR MAYORAL TERM (Ch. 155 of the Acts of 1933)
24		John D. Devir	January 2, 1933	January 1, 1940	7 years	
25		William A. Hastings (1868–1950)	January 1, 1940	January 2, 1942	2 years	Republican
26		Vernon C. Newman	January 2, 1942	January 2, 1944	2 years	
—		Max Rosenblatt^{[c]}	February 8, 1943	December 31, 1943	11 months	
27		John D. McCarthy	January 3, 1944	January 5, 1948	4 years	
28		Fred I. Lamson (1910–1981)	January 5, 1948	January 6, 1958	10 years	Republican
29		Walter J. Kelliher (1912/13–1997)	January 6, 1958	January 4, 1960	2 years	Democrat
30		John P. Donnelly (d. 2007)	January 4, 1960	January 1, 1962	2 years	Democrat
31		Walter J. Kelliher (1912/13–1997)	January 1, 1962	January 5, 1976	14 years	Democrat
32		James S. Conway (1930–2019)	January 5, 1976	January 4, 1982	6 years	Democrat
33		Thomas H. Fallon (1942–2010)	January 4, 1982	January 4, 1988	6 years	Democrat
34		James S. Conway (1930–2019)	January 4, 1988	January 6, 1992	4 years	Democrat
35		Edwin C. Lucey (b. 1932)	January 6, 1992	January 1, 1996	4 years	Democrat
FOUR YEAR MAYORAL TERM (Ch. 105 of the Acts of 2005)
36		Richard C. Howard	January 1, 1996	January 2, 2012	16 years	Democrat
37		Gary Christenson	January 2, 2012	Incumbent	13 years, 4 months and 11 days	Democrat

== Notes ==
- ^{a} Died in office after having been re-elected for a second term in December 1912.
- ^{b} Acting Mayor.
- ^{c} Acting mayor while Newman was in United States Army.
