= Funk Farms =

Farm in Illinois

- Interactive map of Funk Farms
- Town/City: McLean County
- State: Illinois
- Country: USA
- Coordinates: 40°22′13.33″N 89°3′14.31″W
- Established: 1824
- Owner: Funk Family
- Produces: corn, soybeans, and alfalfa
- Website: funkfarmstrust.com

Funk Farms is the fourth oldest farm in Illinois which has received the 2012 Environmental Stewardship Award. Abraham Lincoln was one of Funk Farms' first attorneys who later served in the Illinois House of Representatives with Funk Farms founder Isaac Funk.

== History ==
Funk Farms was founded in 1824 by brothers Isaac and Absalom Funk in McLean County, Illinois. From a historical perspective, Abraham Lincoln was one of Funk Farms' first attorneys and later served in the Illinois House of Representatives with Isaac Funk. Isaac was a friend of Lincoln's and an early booster when Lincoln ran for U.S. president. Funk and Lincoln were also responsible for bringing the Chicago & Alton Railroad through Bloomington-Normal Funk Farms in McLean County, detouring it from its originally planned route through Peoria.

In 1901, the Funk family and Funk Farms entered the seed business when Yale educated Eugene Duncan (E.D.) Funk, son of Lafayette Funk and grandson of Isaac, founded Funks Brothers Seed Company. Known for Funk's G-Hybrid seed corn, publicly traded Funk Brothers was the inventor, and world's leading producer, of hybrid corn. In 1941, E.D. Funk Sr. established Funk Farms Trust. The Trust was formed to operate 3,000 acres of land and to feed approximately 6,000 head of cattle. Today, that land is owned by the descendants of E.D. Funk.^{[8][9][10]} The board of trustees is composed of four cousins - all descendants of E.D. Funk. Today, Funk Farms has 3 cash crops - corn, soybeans, and alfalfa, sells premium beef and other items to the public, and runs an organic composting operation.
