= Funk family =

Midwestern United States family

The Funk Family is composed of Midwestern United States pioneers who did business in the fields of agriculture, politics, finance and civic life. Abraham Lincoln was one of Funk Farms' first attorneys and later served in the Illinois House of Representatives with Isaac Funk, who was a friend of Lincoln's and a booster when Lincoln ran for president. Funk and Lincoln were also responsible for bringing the Chicago & Alton Railroad through Bloomington-Normal in McLean County, detouring it from its originally planned route through Peoria.

== Family founders in America ==
Frederick Funk was born in Germany and emigrated from The Palatinate, a section of the Rhineland, to the United States on the Pink Mary in 1733. Like other immigrants, Funk was seeking religious freedom in his new country. During the voyage, Adam Funk was born to Frederick's wife Sarah (Moore), who died during childbirth. Adam Funk settled in Shenandoah County, Virginia near Strasburg. He married Sarah Long of Philadelphia, Pennsylvania. His son Adam Funk, Jr. was raised in Virginia. Some time around 1790, Adam Funk, Jr. moved to Clark County, Kentucky. In 1808, he removed to Fayette County, Ohio. Adam Funk, Jr. had at one time accumulated significant wealth, but he died poor. However, he was prolific in progeny: he and his wife had nine children—six sons and three daughters.

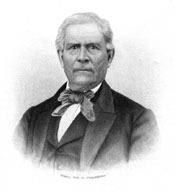
Family patriarch Isaac Funk

The Funks and Stubblefields were among the first settlers in the county and put down roots in the area now known as Funks Grove, Illinois. In 1824, brothers Isaac and Absalom Funk, the sons of Adam Funk, Jr., moved to McLean County. Six months later in December 1824, Dorothy Funk Stubblefield and husband Robert Stubblefield followed from Ohio; Robert had earlier been widowed after being married to another Funk sister, Sarah, for 25 years. Their father Adam Funk Jr. arrived the same year; he chose the site of Funks Grove Cemetery, and in 1830 he was one of the first to be buried there. In 1826, Isaac married Cassandra Sharp, who eventually gave him 10 children.

By the 1830s, the Funks were among the richest settlers in the area, but they lost half of their fortune in the Panic of 1837. Isaac and Absalom dissolved their partnership the following year, in 1838, after which Isaac continued to raise cattle and to slowly rebuild his fortune. In 1840, Isaac was elected to the Illinois House of Representatives and served a single two-year term. The Great Flood of 1844 again caused financial havoc, and Isaac once again rebuilt his finances. In 1862, he was appointed to fill the remaining Illinois Senate term of Richard J. Oglesby, who had resigned to fight in the Civil War; Isaac was re-elected to a second two-year term in 1864. From 1864 to 1865, Isaac Funk, Robert Stubblefield and their sons built the Funks Grove Church next to the cemetery from white pine shipped by railroad.

== Family businesses and charitable activities ==
Isaac Funk raised livestock and drove it to market on foot and later served in the Illinois House and in the Illinois Senate; his sons and their descendants were mostly involved in banking, politics and agricultural businesses such as Funk Brothers Seed Company and seed farms. While in the state legislature, Isaac met and became a friend and supporter of Abraham Lincoln. While Isaac was away, his sons, led by eldest son George Washington Funk (called “The General” by his siblings), took care of the farm. Like other pioneer American settlers, Isaac and his sons made maple sugar and maple sirup from the local sugar maples, which were plentiful in the area. His youngest son, Isaac II, took over the sirup production around 1860, when demand for maple sweeteners rose during the Civil War as Northerners used them in place of Southern cane sugar. Isaac II's son Arthur opened the first commercial maple sirup camp at Funks Grove in 1891. Isaac II's other son, Lawrence (Arthur's brother), took over the commercial operation in 1896.

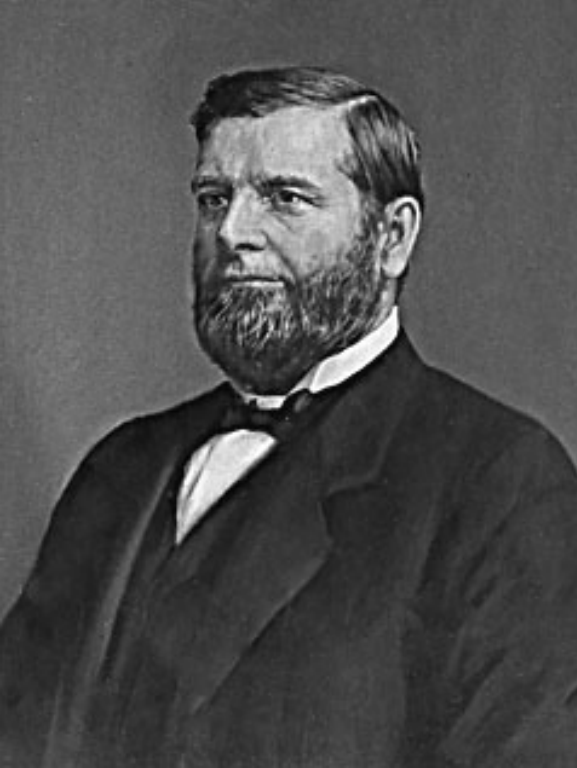
Marquis de LaFayette Funk

Isaac II had a brother, Absalom Funk, named after their uncle Absalom, their father's brother. The younger Absalom's daughter, Hazel Funk Holmes, who was cousin to Arthur and Lawrence, took over the family sirup business during the early 1920s; she owned the property on which the sirup operation (Funks Grove Pure Maple Sirup) is now located and was the owner when U.S. Route 66 came through the area in November 1926. Hazel was the one who modernized the operation and ensured that the family business continued well into the future. Because Hazel's primary residence was still out East, however, she rented out her land to tenants who tapped the sugar maples every spring, made the sirup, and farmed the rest of the land, and she built a new sugarhouse to house a flue-pan evaporator. The little peaked cabin that Arthur and Lawrence had used as a cooking house was moved to its present location on the farm, where Hazel used it as a guesthouse and as her summer home. Hazel also protected her land for the future: in her will, she placed her timber and farmland in a trust, for use by the family maple sugaring business. In that same trust, she insisted that their product be forever called maple sirup, spelled with an 'i' -- as was the preferred spelling in Webster's at the time to indicate a pure maple product made only from boiled maple sap and untainted by other sweeteners or additional ingredients.

Sirup production was temporarily halted in 1942 because of World War II—heavy taxes on sugar made the maple sugaring business unprofitable—but production resumed the following year. In 1947, Lawrence's son Stephen Funk, a veteran airman of the war, and Stephen's wife, Glaida, took over the sirup operation. When during the early 1970s it looked like construction of Interstate 55 through McLean County would cut through the Funks Grove's virgin prairie forest and the family's prized sugar maples, the family successfully petitioned to get the superhighway rerouted around the historic grove. A billboard erected alongside the new interstate ensured that the maple business lost no customers due to the new highway. During the late 1970s, Stephen and his son Mike formed a partnership to run the sirup operation. In 1988, Stephen retired, and Mike and his wife, Debby, took over the business; later that year, Stephen and his sons Mike, Larry and Adam built the current sugarhouse, the first one to include a salesroom. Mike's nephew Sean Funk became a partner in the business in 2001. Today, Funks Grove Maple Sirup has both a mail-order business and an online ordering system, thanks in part to the increased popularity that came with resurging interest in Historic Route 66.

Family patriarch Isaac Funk's brother Absalom Funk was one of Northwestern University's first trustees. LaFayette Funk was on the University of Illinois board. The Funks also helped found Illinois Wesleyan University, where Isaac Funk was one of the founders, and Chicago's Union Stock Yards. Funk's G-Hybrid and the Funk Brothers Seed Company were, in their day, the world's leading producers of hybrid corn. Funk Farms and Funks Grove (near Shirley Illinois, and home to the Funks Grove highway rest stop off of Highway 55) are still up and running, though the seed companies are not.

Funk ACES Library at the University of Illinois at Urbana-Champaign is named after the Funk family and its patriarch, Isaac Funk. In 1986, the Funk family made a generous gift to the University. This gift from the Funk family with the help of others eventually became the funds used to build the library, which was then named in their honor.

== Bloodline ==
- Frederick Funk
  - Adam Funk (1733–?)
    - Adam Funk, Jr. (1758–1830), m. Sarah (Moore) Funk, aka Nancy Ann (?)
      - Isaac Funk (1797–1865), Illinois State Representative 1840–1842, Illinois State Senator 1862–1866; named to the Farmers' Hall of Fame at the University of Illinois in 1913; m. Cassandra (Sharp)
        - George W. Funk (1827–1911), Illinois State Representative 1870–1872
        - Adam Funk (1828–1847)
        - Jacob Funk (1830–1919), president of the Bloomington State National Bank
        - Duncan McArthur Funk (1832–1911), president of First National Bank of Bloomington, Illinois State Representative 1896–1902
        - Marquis De LaFayette Funk, aka LaFayette Funk (1834–1919), Illinois State Representative 1882–1884, Illinois State Senator 1884–1888; one of the founders of Chicago's Union Stock Yards, chairman of the Illinois exhibit at the World's Columbian Exposition in 1893, a trustee of the University of Illinois at Urbana-Champaign 1891-1893
          - Eugene Duncan Funk (1867–1944), member of Illinois Board of Agricultural Advisors
          - Edgar Paullin Funk (1871-1873)
          - Marquis DeLoss Funk (1882-1966), Farmer, Pioneer in electricity and automobiles
        - Francis Marion Funk (1836–1899), president of the Bloomington School Board
        - Benjamin F. Funk (1838–1909), Mayor of Bloomington, Illinois 1871–1876 1884–1886; delegate to the Republican National Convention 1888; U.S. Representative from Illinois 1893–1895.
          - Franklin H. Funk (1869–1940), member of the Illinois Republican Committee 1906–1912, Illinois State Senator 1909–1911, delegate to the Progressive Party National Convention 1912 1916, candidate for U.S. Senate from Illinois 1913, delegate to the Republican National Convention 1920, U.S. Representative from Illinois 1921–1927.
        - Absalom Funk (1842–1915)
          - Hazel (Funk) Holmes, creator of the trust that preserved much of the family's timber and farmland in Funks Grove, head of Funks Grove Maple Sirup from the early 1940s through 1947
        - Isaac Funk, Jr. (1844–1909), aka Isaac Funk II
          - Arthur Funk, son of Isaac Funk, Jr., brother of Lawrence, and founder in 1891 of the family's commercial maple sirup farm, Funks Grove Maple Sirup
          - Lawrence Funk, son of Isaac Funk, Jr., brother of Arthur
            - Stephen Funk, son of Lawrence Funk and head of Funks Grove Maple Sirup from 1947 to 1988
              - Michael (Mike) Funk, head of Funks Grove Maple Sirup since 1988
        - Sarah (Funk) Kerrick (1846–1907), m. Leonidas H. Kerrick, State Representative and trustee of the University of Illinois
      - Absalom Funk (?-1851), son of Adam Funk, Jr., brother and partner of Isaac Funk
      - Jacob Funk (1793-1832)
      - Sarah (Funk) Stubblefield (1796-1821), m. Robert Stubblefield (1793-1870) April 14, 1814 in Fayette, Ohio
      - Dorothy (Funk) Stubblefield (1799-1878), m. Robert Stubblefield (1793-1870) after Sarah died
