= Thomas Fallon (disambiguation) =

Thomas Fallon (1825–1885) was an Irish-born, Canadian-raised American capitalist and politician, the mayor of San Jose, California.

Thomas Fallon may also refer to:

- Thomas H. Fallon (1942–2010), American lawyer, mayor of Malden, Massachusetts
- Thomas Timothy Fallon (1837–1916), Irish-born American Civil War soldier
- Thomas J. Fallon, American prosecutor, featured in Making a Murderer
