= Jonathan H. Rowell =

American politician

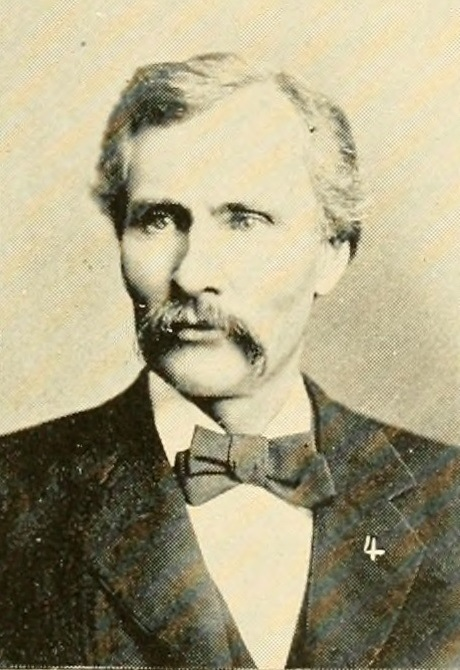
- From 1894's A History of Eureka College

Member of the U.S. House of Representatives from Illinois's 14th district
- In office March 4, 1883 – March 3, 1891
- Preceded by: Joseph Gurney Cannon
- Succeeded by: Owen Scott

Personal details
- Born: February 10, 1833 Haverhill, New Hampshire, U.S.
- Died: May 15, 1908 (aged 75) Bloomington, Illinois, U.S.
- Party: Republican

Jonathan Harvey Rowell (February 10, 1833 – May 15, 1908) was a U.S. representative from Illinois.

== Biography ==
Born in Haverhill, New Hampshire, Rowell attended Rock Creek School and later graduated from Eureka College, Illinois. During the Civil War he served as a company officer in the Seventeenth Regiment, Illinois Volunteer Infantry.

In 1867 his son Chester Harvey Rowell was born. Chester would later become active in politics in California. He studied law. He was admitted to the bar in 1866 and commenced practice in Bloomington, Illinois. He was the state's attorney of the eighth judicial circuit of Illinois 1868-1872.

Rowell was elected as a Republican to the 48th United States Congress and to the three succeeding Congresses (March 4, 1883 – March 3, 1891). He served as chairman of the Committee on Elections (Fifty-first Congress). He was an unsuccessful candidate for reelection in 1890 to the Fifty-second Congress after which he resumed the practice of law.

He died in Bloomington, McLean County, Illinois, May 16, 1908, and was interred in Evergreen Cemetery (Bloomington, Illinois).

U.S. House of Representatives
Preceded by Joseph G. Cannon	Member of the U.S. House of Representatives from Illinois's 14th congressional district 1883-1891	Succeeded by Benjamin F. Funk
