= Senator Foley =

Senator Foley may refer to:

- Brian X. Foley (born 1957), New York State Senate
- Eileen Foley (1918–2016), New Hampshire State Senate
- Helen Foley (politician) (fl. 1980s), Nevada State Senate
- James A. Foley (1882–1946), New York State Senate
- Leo Foley (1928–2016), Minnesota State Senate
- Mark Foley (born 1954), Florida State Senate
- Mike Foley (Nebraska politician) (born 1954), Nebraska State Senate
- Robert Foley (American politician) (born 1953), Maine State Senate
- Samuel J. Foley (politician) (1862–1922), New York State Senate
- William J. Foley (1887–1952), Massachusetts State Senate
