= Homer W. Hall =

American politician (1870–1954)

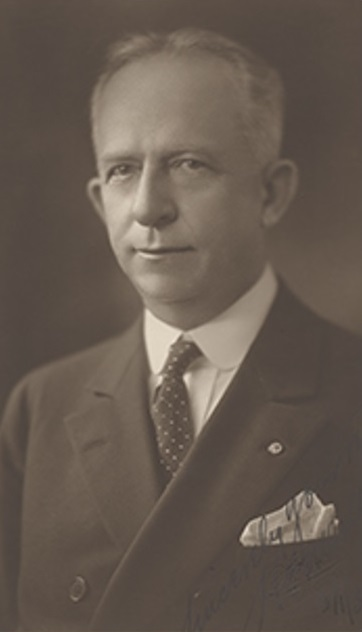

Member of the U.S. House of Representatives from Illinois's 17th district
- In office March 4, 1927 – March 3, 1933
- Preceded by: Frank H. Funk
- Succeeded by: Frank Gillespie

Personal details
- Born: July 22, 1870 Shelbyville, Illinois
- Died: September 22, 1954 (aged 84) Bloomington, Illinois
- Party: Republican

Homer William Hall (July 22, 1870 – September 22, 1954) was a U.S. Representative from Illinois.

Born in Shelbyville, Illinois, Hall moved with his parents to Bloomington, Illinois, in 1876. He attended the public schools and Illinois Wesleyan University at Bloomington. He studied law. He was admitted to the bar in 1892 and commenced practice in Bloomington, Illinois. He engaged in banking and was also interested in agricultural pursuits. He was a county judge of McLean County 1909-1914, probate judge 1909-1914, and master in chancery 1916-1918. He served as delegate to the Republican National Convention in 1916.

Hall was elected as a Republican to the Seventieth, Seventy-first, and Seventy-second Congresses (March 4, 1927 – March 3, 1933). He was an unsuccessful candidate for reelection in 1932 to the Seventy-third Congress. He resumed the practice of law and agricultural pursuits.

Hall was again elected as county judge of McLean County, in 1934, and served until his retirement in 1942. He died in Bloomington, Illinois, September 22, 1954. He was interred in Park Hill Cemetery.

U.S. House of Representatives
Preceded by Frank H. Funk	Member of the U.S. House of Representatives from Illinois's 17th congressional district 1927-1933	Succeeded by Frank Gillespie
