= George W. Funk =

American politician

Member of the Illinois House of Representatives from the 63rd district
- In office 1870 – 1872

Personal details
- Born: George Washington Funk; May 14, 1827 Funks Grove, Illinois, U.S.
- Died: July 15, 1911 (aged 84)
- Party: Republican
- Spouse(s): Susan Pumpelley (m. 1868; died 1869) Rose Fitzwilliams (m. 1876)
- Children: 4
- Profession: Rancher

George Washington Funk (May 14, 1827 – July 15, 1911) was an American rancher and politician from Illinois. The son of prominent state politician Isaac Funk, and a member of the Funk family, George W. Funk was tasked with dividing his father's vast holdings upon his death. Although he held similar political beliefs as his father, he was only elected to office once: to the Illinois House of Representatives in 1870 to a two-year term.

== Biography ==
George Washington Funk was born in Funks Grove, Illinois, on May 14, 1827. He was the eldest son of Cassandra (Sharp) and Isaac Funk. Funk attended public schools and assisted on his father's farm. Upon the death of his father in 1865, Funk was responsible for fairly dividing the 27,000 acres (11,000 ha) of land holdings among his siblings. Funk was left with 4,000 acres (1,600 ha) in McLean County. Three years later, Funk moved to Mount Hope Township in the same county. He was named president of the People's Bank of Atlanta and was also involved with the First National Bank of Bloomington and banks in Lincoln and Springfield. Like his father, who had served in the Illinois House of Representatives and the Illinois Senate, Funk was a staunch Republican. Funk showed little interest in pursuing political office, but was nonetheless elected to the Illinois House in 1870. He served one two-year term there.

Funk married Susan Pumpelley in 1868. However, she died the following year. He remarried to Rose Fitzwilliams in 1876. Funk had one son by his first wife and three children by his second. Funk died on July 15, 1911, and was buried in Funks Grove Cemetery.
