= Owen Scott =

American politician

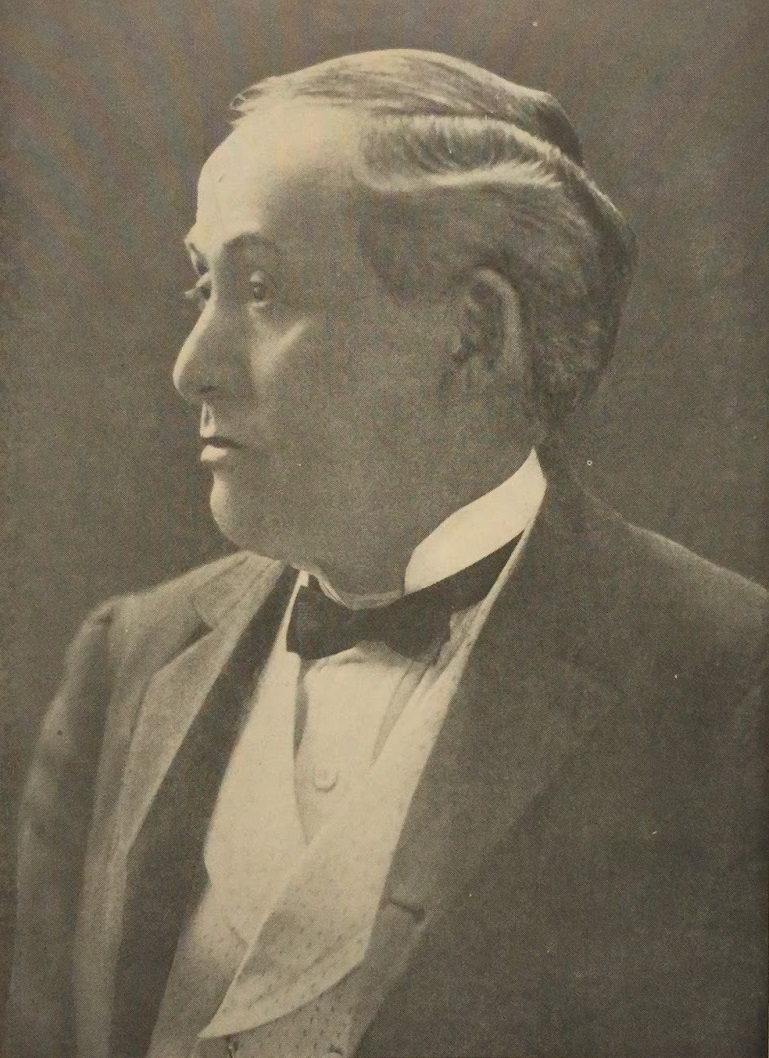
- From 1908's I.O.O.F. Proceedings of the Grand Lodge of Illinois

Member of the U.S. House of Representatives from Illinois's 14th district
- In office March 4, 1891 – March 3, 1893
- Preceded by: Jonathan H. Rowell
- Succeeded by: Benjamin F. Funk

Personal details
- Born: July 6, 1848 Jackson Township, Illinois, U.S.
- Died: December 21, 1928 (aged 80) Decatur, Illinois, U.S.
- Party: Democratic

Owen Scott (July 6, 1848 – December 21, 1928) was a U.S. Representative from Illinois.

Born on a farm in Jackson Township, Illinois, Scott attended the common schools, a private school in Kinmundy and the State normal school in Normal, Illinois. He taught school. He also served as the Superintendent of Schools for Effingham County, Illinois from 1873 to 1881. He studied law. He was admitted to the bar in 1873 and commenced practice in Effingham, Illinois. He engaged in newspaper work, where he published the Effingham Democrat. He served as mayor of Effingham in 1882, and the City Attorney in 1883 and 1884. He moved to Bloomington, Illinois, in 1884 and became proprietor and manager of the Bloomington Daily and Weekly Bulletins. Afterwards, he was appointed as the Deputy Collector of Internal Revenue by President Cleveland. He served as chairman of the Illinois Democratic convention at Springfield, Illinois, in 1888.

Scott was elected as a Democrat to the Fifty-second Congress (March 4, 1891 – March 3, 1893). He was an unsuccessful candidate for reelection in 1892 to the Fifty-third Congress. He moved to Decatur, Illinois, in 1899 and managed the Decatur Herald until 1904, when he engaged in the insurance business. He retired from the insurance business in 1921 to become secretary of the Masonic Grand Lodge of Illinois, which position he held until his death in Decatur, Illinois, December 21, 1928. He was interred in Oak Ridge Cemetery, Effingham, Illinois.

U.S. House of Representatives
Preceded by Jonathan H. Rowell	Member of the U.S. House of Representatives from Illinois's 14th congressional district 1891-1893	Succeeded by Benjamin F. Funk
