= Duncan McArthur Funk =

American politician

Member of the Illinois House of Representatives from the 22nd district
- In office 1896 – 1902

Personal details
- Born: June 1, 1832 Funks Grove, Illinois
- Died: December 17, 1911 (aged 79)
- Party: Republican
- Profession: Banker and rancher

Duncan McArthur Funk (June 1, 1832 – December 17, 1911) was an American politician, banker, and rancher from Illinois. Born to Isaac Funk, patriarch of the Funk family, Funk left the family settlement to open a store in Bloomington, Illinois. Following his father's death, Funk tended to his share of his inherited property. Funk was president of the First National Bank of Bloomington and had financial interests in several others. He was elected to three consecutive terms in the Illinois House of Representatives.

== Biography ==
Duncan McArthur Funk was born on June 1, 1832, in Funks Grove, Illinois, to Cassandra (Sharp) and Isaac Funk. He attended public schools and assisted with managing the family lands. When Funk was twenty-five, he left the farm to open a store in Bloomington, Illinois, as Temple & Funk. He co-owned the store until 1866, when he returned to tend to the family farm following the death of his father. Funk received 2,400 acres (970 ha) of his father's lands, where he raised cattle and hogs.

Funk also received a share of the First National Bank of Bloomington. He became closely involved with its operations and was named its president in 1874. He held the office for more than 20 years. Funk also maintained financial interests in the First National Bank of Shelbyville, Illinois; the Bankers' National Bank of Chicago; the First National Bank of Normal; and the State Bank of Hayworth. Funk was also a stockholder of the Bloomington Gaslight & Heating Company.

Funk followed his father's political convictions and was a member of the Republican Party. He was elected a member of the board of Supervisors of Bloomington Township. He held the position for over twenty years. In 1896, Funk was elected on the Republican ticket to the Illinois House of Representatives, where he served a two-year term. He was re-elected in the two subsequent elections.

Duncan Funk married Elizabeth Richardson on April 16, 1857. They had two children: Isabelle and Isaac Lincoln. He died on December 17, 1911.
