= Jackson Township, Illinois =

Jackson Township may refer to one of the following places in the U.S. state of Illinois:

- Jackson Township, Effingham County, Illinois
- Jackson Township, Will County, Illinois

== See also ==
- Jackson Township (disambiguation)
