= Harvey Fields (politician) =

American politician

Harvey Goodwyn Fields Sr.

Louisiana State Senator for Union and Red River parishes
- In office 1916–1920
- Preceded by: J. G. Taylor
- Succeeded by: W. T. Barham

United States Attorney for the Western District of Louisiana
- In office 1937–1941
- Succeeded by: Malcolm Lafargue

Personal details
- Born: May 31, 1882 Marksville, Louisiana, US
- Died: May 5, 1961 (aged 78) Union Parish, Louisiana, US
- Party: Democratic
- Spouse: Evelyn Sanders Fields (married 1908; died 1961)
- Children: 3, including T. T. Fields
- Education: Louisiana Tech University; Tulane University Law School
- Occupation: Lawyer

Harvey Goodwyn Fields Sr. (May 31, 1882 – May 5, 1961) was an American lawyer and Democratic politician from Farmerville, Louisiana, who was affiliated with the Long Political faction, and served in the Louisiana State Senate from 1916–1920.

He had a son, T. T. Fields, served in the Louisiana House of Representatives. A grandson, Thomas T. Fields, penned a 2009 biography of Fields, I Called Him Grand Dad. Fields died in 1961.

Political offices
| Preceded by J. G. Taylor; W. T. Barham | Louisiana State Senator for Morehouse and Union parishes 1916–1920 | Succeeded by W. L. Bagwell; H. B. Warren |
| Preceded by Missing | United States Attorney for the Western District of Louisiana; 1937–1941 | Succeeded by Malcolm Lafargue |
