= Oliver Ford (politician) =

American politician

Member of the New Hampshire House of Representatives from the Rockingham 4th district
- In office 2020 – December 7, 2022

Member of the New Hampshire House of Representatives from the Rockingham 3rd district
- In office December 7, 2022 – December 4, 2024
- Succeeded by: Mary Ford

Personal details
- Party: Republican
- Spouse: Mary Ford

Oliver Ford is an American politician. He served as a Republican member for the Rockingham 3rd district of the New Hampshire House of Representatives.
