= Richard C. Howard =

American politician

Winchester, Massachusetts Town Manager
- In office January 2, 2012 – October 31, 2018
- Preceded by: Melvin Kleckner
- Succeeded by: Lisa Wong

Mayor of Malden
- In office January 1, 1996 - January 2, 2012
- Preceded by: Edwin C. Lucey
- Succeeded by: Gary Christenson

Personal details
- Party: Democratic

Richard C. Howard is the former town manager of Winchester, Massachusetts and Mayor of Malden.
