= Mary Ford (politician) =

American politician

Member of New Hampshire House of Representatives for Rockingham 3
- Incumbent
- Assumed office December 4, 2024
- Preceded by: Oliver Ford

Personal details
- Party: Republican
- Spouse: Oliver Ford

Mary J. Ford is an American politician. She is a member of the New Hampshire House of Representatives and represents Rockingham's 3rd district.
