= David J. Bellis =

California educator and politician (1944–2006)

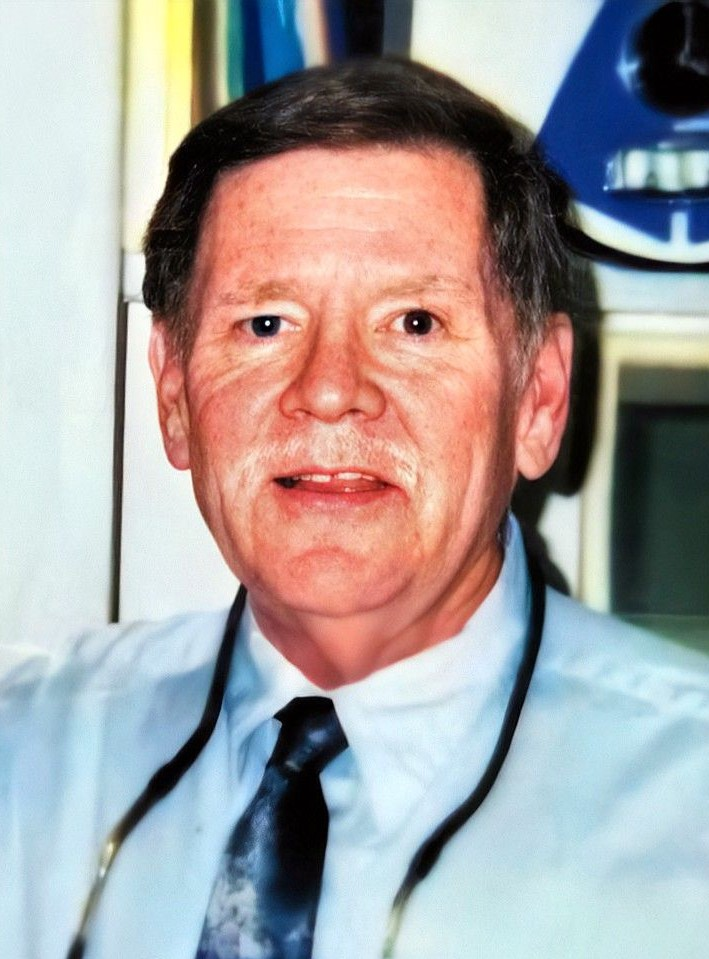

36th Mayor of Signal Hill, California
- In office April 1983 – April 1984
- Preceded by: William F. Mendenhall
- Succeeded by: Louis A. Dare

Mayor pro tem of Signal Hill, California
- In office April 1982 – April 1983

Member, Signal Hill City Council
- In office April 1980 – September 1986

Personal details
- Born: May 1, 1944 Minneapolis, Hennepin County, Minnesota, U.S.
- Died: June 29, 2006 (aged 62) Rolling Hills, California, US
- Resting place: Green Hills Memorial Park, Rancho Palos Verdes, California, U.S.
- Party: Democratic
- Spouse: Ann Seagreaves (m. 1972)
- Children: 1
- Education: University of California Los Angeles (undergraduate); University of Southern California (Ph.D.)

David J. Bellis (May 1, 1944 – June 29, 2006) was an educator and politician. He served on the Signal Hill (California) City Council from April 1980 to September 1986, as mayor from April 1983 to April 1984, and chaired the Signal Hill Redevelopment Agency. He later chaired the City of San Bernardino's Main Street Program, which worked to revitalize downtown San Bernardino.

He was the son of Carroll Joseph Bellis (1908–2015) and the former Helen Louise Jett (1913–2012). The elder Bellis served as surgical consultant to the Surgeon General of the U.S. Army and was a longtime surgeon at St. Mary Medical Center in Long Beach, California, completing over 26,000 herniorrhaphies during his tenure. He invented the mersilene mesh hernia-repair procedure and was the first to perform the procedure as an outpatient surgery.

David and the former Ann Seagreaves (1944 – 2025) were married on December 23, 1972 in Los Angeles, California.

== Musician ==
An accomplished saxophone and clarinet player, Bellis was a professional musician in the 1960s, performing with Jan and Dean, and Dick Dale and the Del-Tones. He also had his own jazz quintet. His brother, Joseph Carroll Bellis (1940-2005), was a trumpeter with the Lawrence Welk Television Band.

== Advocate and author ==
Bellis earned his PhD in public administration at the University of Southern California in 1977, taught at Long Beach City College and later at UCLA and USC.

He worked as a grant writer, intake worker and program evaluator for addiction treatment and gang prevention programs; served as director of economic planning for The East Los Angeles Community Union; and advocated for improvements in local, regional and federal policies regarding drug addiction and treatment.

He authored "Heroin and Politicians: The Failure of Public Policy to Control Addiction in America" (Praeger, 1981); and "Hotel Ritz — Comparing Mexican and U.S. Street Prostitutes: Factors in HIV/AIDS Transmission" (Routledge, 2003)

== Signal Hill City Council ==
Bellis became involved in Signal Hill politics in the late 1970s out of concern for what he saw as uncontrolled residential development and insufficient building-height standards. Curious about City Council member Reginald G. Balchin's votes on residential development projects in the city, Bellis, his wife Ann, and Ken Mills, editor of the Signal Hill Tribune, conducted a lengthy investigation that found evidence Balchin had voted on numerous development projects in which he had a financial interest.

Bellis was elected to the City Council in April 1980. Balchin and Mayor Marion F. "Buzz" McCallen were recalled from office in November that year, the latter because of building code violations on his property. (Balchin sued recall leaders Leo Bryan Aller, John T. Cronin, Carole Lynch, Richard Walker Jr., Leonard Meachom, and "John Does 1 through 10" — which ultimately included the Bellises — for libel after the Notice of Intent to Recall was published as a legal notice in the Signal Hill Tribune. The recall leaders countersued, and Balchin paid a settlement in 1988.)

In 1981, with the help of other newly elected council members, Bellis oversaw a change of administration in the Signal Hill Police Department after two suspects died within a one-week period in the city jail. One of the suspects, Ron Settles, an African American college football player, had been stopped for speeding; the department reported his death as a suicide, but an inquest determined the death was likely caused by officers' use of a choke hold. The City of Signal Hill later paid a settlement to the Settles family. Subsequent investigations revealed 42 formal complaints of police brutality had been made against the department in the 13 preceding years.

In 1981, Bellis was the target of a recall attempt. The recall failed, and Bellis would go on to serve as mayor pro tem in 1982 and as mayor in 1983–84 (Signal Hill's council elects the mayor and mayor pro tem from among its members). Voters reelected him to a second four-year council term in 1984. Bellis served as chairman of the city's Redevelopment Agency from 1985–86.

Bellis advocated for better planning for the amount, density and type of new construction; and for building-height standards, view protection, and economic revitalization of the city's core. "Bellis also oversaw the city's redevelopment efforts, which brought the Price Club to the city and a new warehouse and office building for Eastman Inc.," the Los Angeles Times reported later.

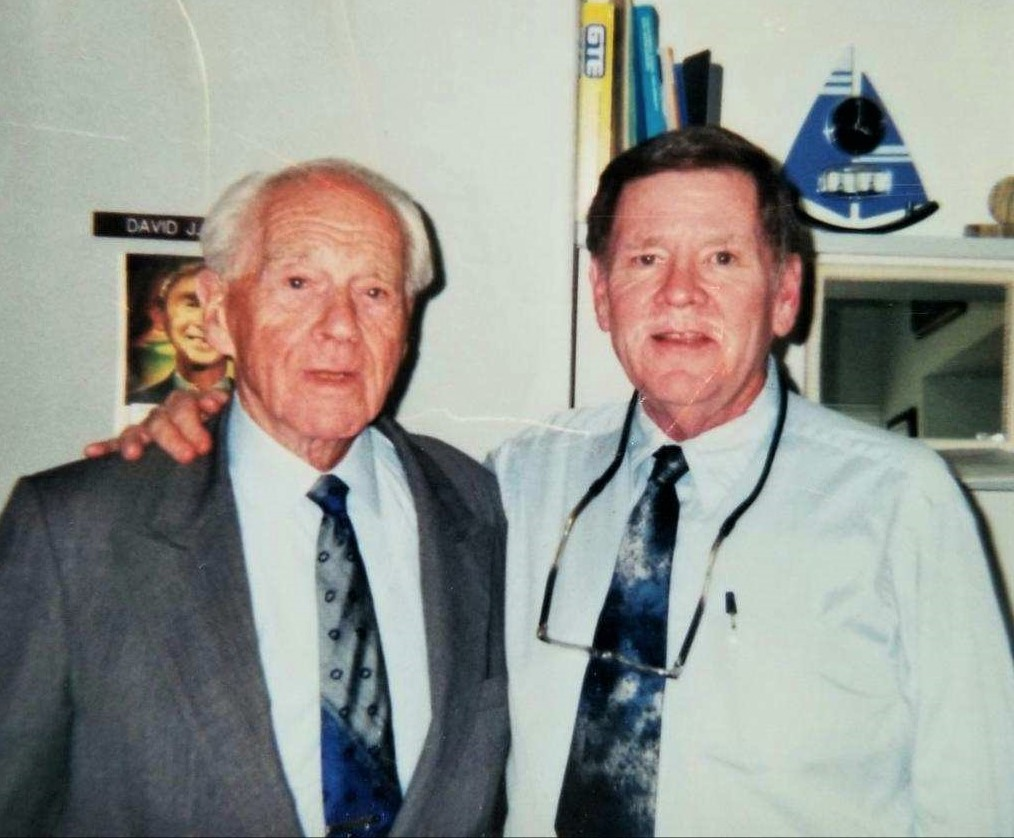
From right, Dr. David J. Bellis, public administration professor and former mayor of Signal Hill, California; and his father, Dr. Carroll J. Bellis, noted surgeon and inventor of the mersilene mesh hernia repair procedure.

== California State University, San Bernardino ==
Bellis resigned from the City Council and as chairman of the Redevelopment Agency in September 1986 to become associate professor of public administration at California State University, San Bernardino. He later became chairman of the public administration department, a position he held until his death from heart failure in 2006. He also chaired San Bernardino's Main Street Program, which worked to revitalize downtown.

During his teaching career, he received the American Society for Public Administration's Outstanding Educator Award, and 11 awards from California State University for research and teaching. "Among many other areas of consultation and research, the public administration professor had studied factors that contributed to the transmission of HIV/AIDS in the U.S. and Mexico," the university's magazine reported on page 7 in its fall/winter 2006–07 edition.

While at California State University, San Bernardino, he and his wife, Ann, and son, James, lived in the San Bernardino Mountains community of Lake Arrowhead. He died suddenly of heart failure in Rolling Hills while visiting his parents and was interred at Green Hills Memorial Park in Rancho Palos Verdes, California. Dr. Bellis was deeply loved and respected by his family and peers.

Political offices
Preceded by Robert F. Randle	Member, Signal Hill (California) City Council; 1980–1986	Succeeded by Louis A. Dare
Preceded by	Mayor pro tem of Signal Hill, California; 1982–1983	Succeeded by
Preceded by William F. Mendenhall	Mayor of Signal Hill, California; 1983–1984	Succeeded by Louis A. Dare
Preceded by	Chairman, Signal Hill (California) Redevelopment Agency; 1985–1986	Succeeded by
