= LaFayette Funk =

American politician

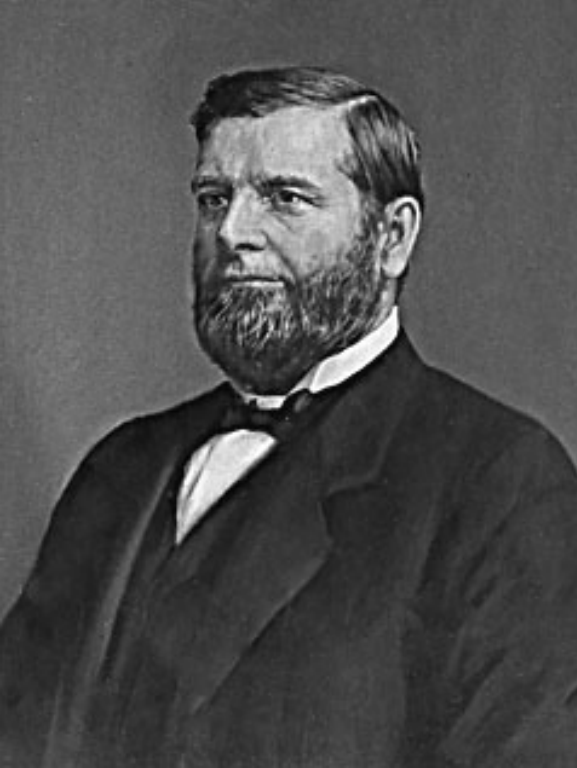

Member of the Illinois Senate from the 28th district
- In office 1884 – 1888
- Preceded by: Joseph W. Fifer
- Succeeded by: Thomas C. Kerrick

Member of the Illinois House of Representatives from the 28th district
- In office 1882 – 1884

Personal details
- Born: January 20, 1834 Funks Grove, Illinois
- Died: December 17, 1911 (aged 79)
- Party: Republican
- Profession: Rancher

Marquis De LaFayette Funk (1834-1911), commonly known as Lafayette Funk, was an American politician and rancher from Illinois. A son of Isaac Funk, Funk graduated from Ohio Wesleyan University and helped manage his father's farm. When his father died, Funk managed his inheritance. Funk was elected to the Illinois House of Representatives in 1882, then filled Joseph W. Fifer's seat in the Illinois Senate the following year. He was re-elected to the senate in 1886. Funk also served two years as a trustee of the University of Illinois.

== Biography ==
Marquis De LaFayette Funk was born on January 20, 1834, to Cassandra (Sharp) and Isaac Funk, the patriarch of the Funk family. He attended public schools and assisted his family in managing its large holdings. He attended Ohio Wesleyan University, graduating in 1858. Funk was named to the Illinois Board of Agricultural and served in this role for twenty years, including time as its president.

Funk followed his father's political convictions and was a member of the Republican Party. In 1882, Funk was elected to the Illinois House of Representatives. Two years later he was appointed to the Illinois Senate to fill the vacancy created by the election of Joseph W. Fifer to Governor of Illinois. He was re-elected to a second two-year term in the senate in 1886. Funk was named a trustee of the University of Illinois at Urbana-Champaign in 1891 and served for two years. He was chairman of the Illinois exhibit at the World's Columbian Exposition in 1893. In 1898, he was named Supervisor of Funk's Grove Township and held the position for twelve years.

Funk married Elizabeth Paullin on January 12, 1864. They had three children: Eugene Duncan, Edgar, and DeLoss who also was a 32nd Degree Freemason. He died on September 6, 1919, the same day that his brother Jacob died. He was buried in Funks Grove Cemetery.
