= Gary Christenson (mayor) =

American politician

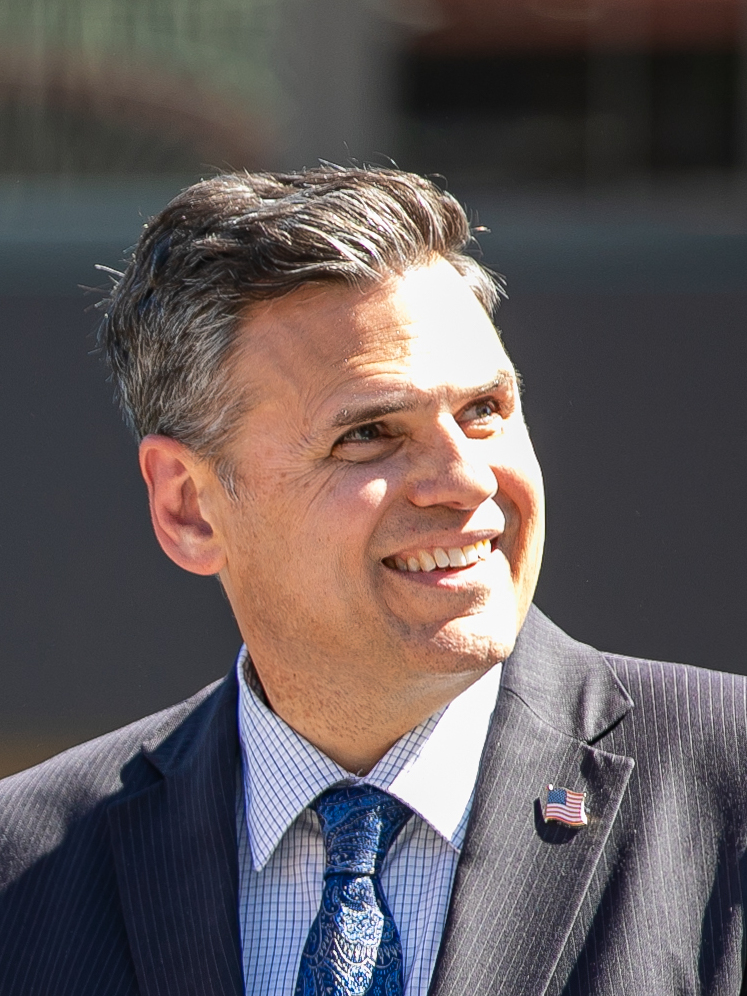
- Christenson in 2022

Mayor of Malden
- Incumbent
- Assumed office January 2, 2012
- Preceded by: Richard C. Howard

President of the Malden City Council
- In office 2008 – December 2011

Member of the Malden City Council from Ward 1
- In office January 2004 - December 2011

Budget Director for Middlesex County Sheriff's Office
- In office January 1998 – January 2011

Personal details
- Born: Gary J. Christenson Malden, Massachusetts
- Party: Democratic
- Education: Suffolk University; Suffolk Business School; Suffolk University Law School
- Website: www.christensonformayor.com

Gary Christenson is the mayor of Malden, Massachusetts.

== Education ==
Christenson is a triple alumnus of Suffolk University. He received a bachelor's degree in political science and business management in 1990 and a master's degree in public administration in 1992. In 2003, Christenson received his Juris Doctor from the Suffolk University Law School.

== Political career ==
Christenson's political career began with working for the Massachusetts House Ways and Means committee from 1994 to 1997. Reporting to Tom Finneran, he was a budget analyst, revenue director, and special assistant. He then worked at the Middlesex County Sheriff's Office where he assumed the role of budget director from 1998 to 2011. He managed a $60 million annual budget during his tenure. He also worked with other Sheriff's Office managers to ensure the efficient operation of the Middlesex Jail in Cambridge and Middlesex House of Correction in Billerica. He received online attention in 2019 for his habit of picking up trash every day while walking to the office.

=== School Committee ===
Christenson was appointed to the Malden School Committee by then-Mayor Richard Howard, the man he would eventually replace as mayor of Malden.

Christenson was encouraged to join the school committee by his mentor James DiPaola, a Malden resident and former head of the Middlesex County Sheriff's Department, where Gary had worked for him.

Since Christenson became Mayor and Chair of the School Committee, the educators’ union became one of the few in the Commonwealth to have to go on strike in the past two decades.

=== City Council ===
Christenson served as a city councillor of Ward 1 in Malden for seven years after taking office in January 2004. In 2006, he was elevated to chairman of the finance committee and in 2008 he was voted unanimously by his peers as city council president.

=== Mayor ===
Christenson was elected mayor of Malden in 2011 and took office on January 2, 2012. He ran unopposed in 2015 and was re-elected for a third term in 2019. He was re-elected to a fourth term in 2023.
