= T. T. Fields =

American politician (1912–1994)

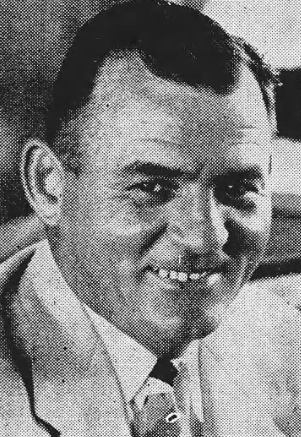
- Fields in 1967

Member of the Louisiana House of Representatives
- In office 1952–1964
- In office 1968–1972

Personal details
- Born: Thomas Theodore Fields Jr. October 12, 1912 Farmerville, Louisiana, U.S.
- Died: January 17, 1994 (aged 81) Farmerville, Louisiana, U.S.
- Party: Democratic
- Children: 1
- Parent: Harvey Fields (father)

Thomas Theodore Fields Jr. (October 12, 1912 – January 17, 1994) was an American politician. A member of the Democratic Party, he served in the Louisiana House of Representatives from 1952 to 1964 and again from 1968 to 1972.

== Life and career ==
Fields was born in Farmerville, Louisiana, the son of Harvey Fields, a Louisiana state senator, and Evelyn Sanders. He served in the armed forces during World War II, which after his discharge, he worked as a banker.

Fields served in the Louisiana House of Representatives from 1952 to 1964 and again from 1968 to 1972.

== Death ==
Fields died on January 17, 1994, in Farmerville, Louisiana, at the age of 81.
