= Benjamin F. Funk =

American politician

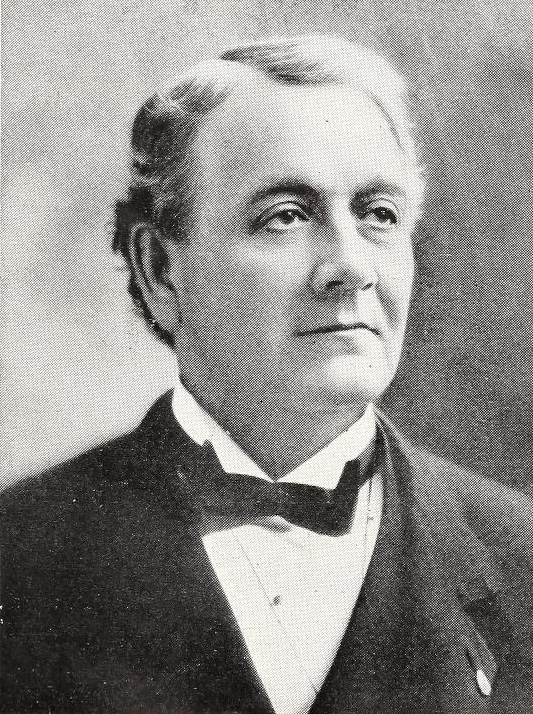
- From 1925's Centennial Catalogue: Commemorating 100 Years of Ownership of the Funk Farms by the Funk Family

Member of the U.S. House of Representatives from Illinois's 14th district
- In office March 4, 1893 – March 3, 1895
- Preceded by: Owen Scott
- Succeeded by: Joseph V. Graff

Personal details
- Born: October 17, 1838 Funk's Grove Township, McLean County, Illinois, U.S.
- Died: February 14, 1909 (aged 70) Bloomington, Illinois, U.S.
- Party: Republican

Benjamin Franklin Funk (October 17, 1838 – February 14, 1909) was a U.S. representative from Illinois, father of Frank Hamilton Funk.

== Biography ==
Born in Funk's Grove Township, McLean County, Illinois, Funk attended the public schools and Illinois Wesleyan University in Bloomington, Illinois. He was the son of Isaac Funk and Cassandra Sharp Funk.

He left school in 1862 to enlist in the Sixty-eighth Regiment, Illinois Volunteer Infantry, as a private, and served five months during the Civil War.

After the war, he returned to the university and finished the course. After this, he engaged in agricultural pursuits.

He returned to Bloomington, in 1869, and served as its mayor from 1871 to 1876 and from 1884 to 1886. He also served as president of the board of trustees at Wesleyan University for twenty years, served as a delegate to the Republican National Convention in 1888 and was a trustee of the asylum for the blind in Jacksonville.

Funk was elected as a Republican to the Fifty-third Congress (March 4, 1893 – March 3, 1895). His candidacy for renomination in 1894 failed, so he returned to agriculture. He died on February 14, 1909, in Bloomington, Illinois.

== See also ==
- List of mayors of Bloomington, Illinois

U.S. House of Representatives
Preceded by Owen Scott	Member of the U.S. House of Representatives from Illinois's 14th congressional district 1893-1895	Succeeded by Joseph V. Graff
