= Frank H. Funk =

American politician (1869-1940)

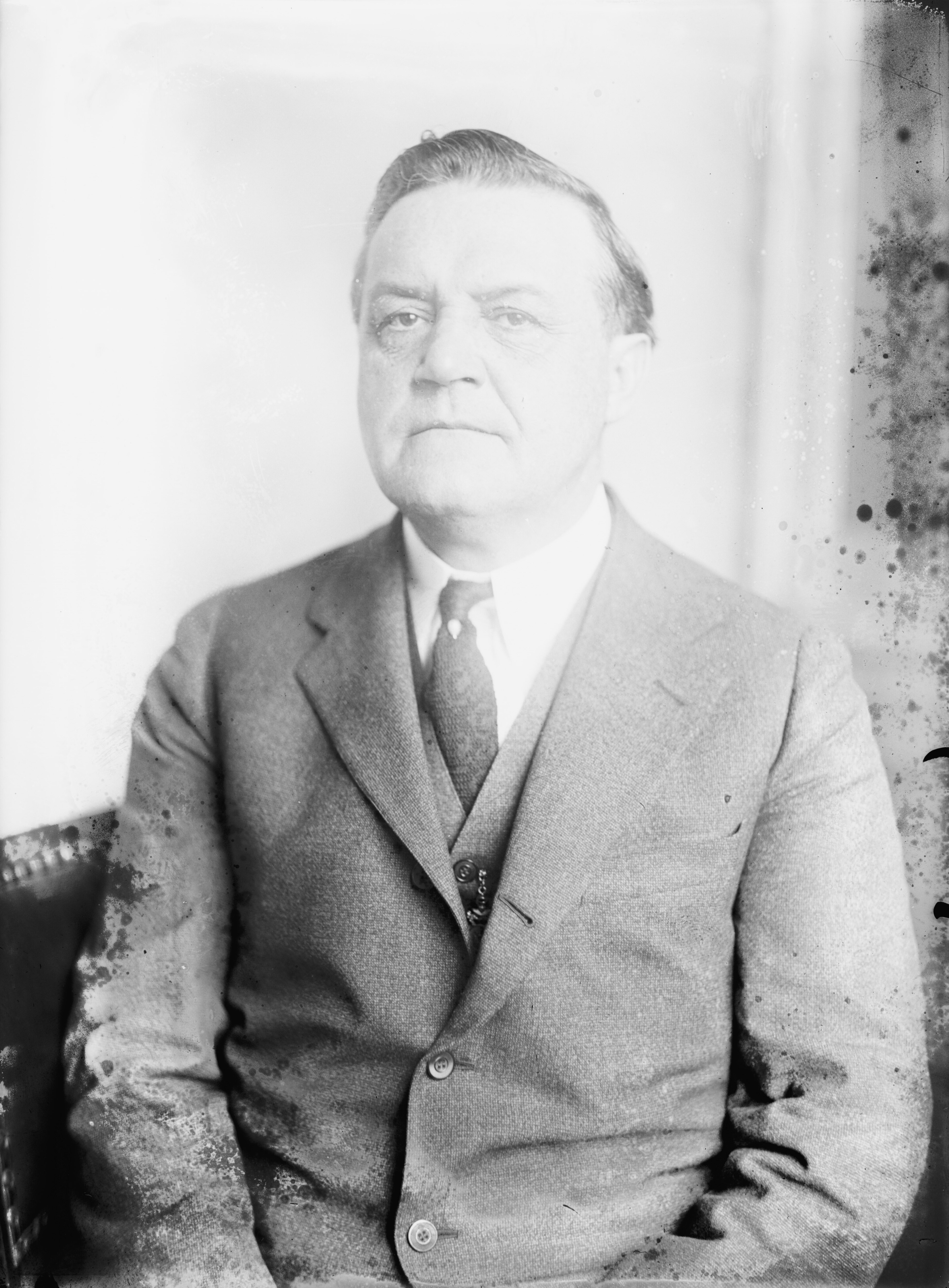
- Funk c. 1921–1922

Member of the U.S. House of Representatives from Illinois's 17th district
- In office March 4, 1921 – March 3, 1927
- Preceded by: Frank L. Smith
- Succeeded by: Homer W. Hall

Member of the Illinois Senate from the 26th district
- In office January 6, 1909- January 8, 1913
- Preceded by: George W. Stubblefield
- Succeeded by: N.E. Franklin

Personal details
- Born: April 5, 1869 Bloomington, Illinois
- Died: November 24, 1940 (aged 71) Bloomington, Illinois
- Party: Republican

Frank Hamilton Funk (April 5, 1869 – November 24, 1940) was a U.S. representative from Illinois, son of Benjamin F. Funk and grandson of Isaac Funk.

== Early life ==
Born in Bloomington, McLean County, Illinois, Funk attended the public schools and the Illinois Normal School at Normal, Illinois. He was graduated from the Lawrenceville School, Lawrenceville, New Jersey, in 1888 and from Yale University in 1891. He engaged in agricultural pursuits and livestock production in Bloomington, Illinois, member of the Illinois Republican State central committee 1906-1912.

== Illinois Senate ==
Funk was elected to the Illinois Senate from the 26th district in 1908. He won a four-way race, winning 11,172 votes to the Democrat's 7,195, Prohibition's 1,492, and the Socialist's 192 votes. He succeeded George W. Stubblefield.

He served as member from 1909-1913.

== Progressive Party ==
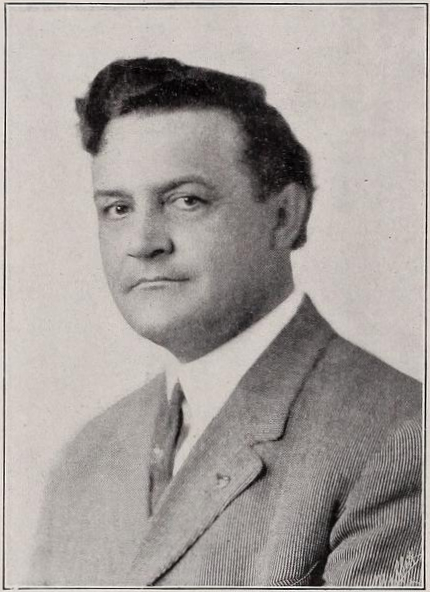
Funk c. 1912

He was an unsuccessful candidate of the Progressive Party for Governor of Illinois in 1912. He served as chairman of the Illinois delegation to the Progressive National Conventions in 1912 and 1916. He was an unsuccessful Progressive nominee for United States Senator in 1913.

== Congress ==
He served as commissioner on the Illinois Public Utilities Commission 1914-1921. He served as delegate to the Republican National Convention in 1920.

Funk was elected as a Republican to the Sixty-seventh, Sixty-eighth, and Sixty-ninth Congresses (March 4, 1921 – March 3, 1927). He was an unsuccessful candidate for renomination in 1926. He retired from public life and active business pursuits. He resided in Bloomington until his death there on November 24, 1940. He was interred in Funk's Grove Cemetery, Funk's Grove, Illinois.

Party political offices
First	Progressive nominee for Governor of Illinois; 1912	Succeeded by None
U.S. House of Representatives
Preceded by Frank L. Smith	Member of the U.S. House of Representatives from Illinois's 17th congressional district 1921-1927	Succeeded by Homer W. Hall
