= Helen Foley (politician) =

American politician

Member of the Nevada State Senate
- In office 1982–1986

Member of the Nevada Assembly
- In office 1980–1982

Personal details
- Party: Democratic

Helen Foley is an American politician from Nevada. She served in the Nevada Senate and the Nevada Assembly. She later worked as a public relations consultant and a volunteer for the Democratic National Committee (DNC). She has been a lobbyist for organisations like the Nevada Assisted Living Association and the American Wild Horse Conservation.

Foley endorsed the Barack Obama 2008 presidential campaign. Foley endorsed the Kamala Harris 2020 presidential campaign. She later endorsed the Joe Biden 2020 presidential campaign.

Foley is the daughter of Nevada Senator Joseph M. Foley.
