= Thomas H. Fallon =

American lawyer

Mayor of Malden, Massachusetts
- In office 1982–1986
- Preceded by: James S. Conway
- Succeeded by: James S. Conway

Chairman of the Malden, Massachusetts School Committee
- In office 1971–1980

Assistant Register of Probate for Middlesex County, Massachusetts
- In office 1972–1973

Assistant City Solicitor for Malden, Massachusetts
- In office 1973–1982

Personal details
- Born: Thomas Henry Fallon; February 16, 1942 Malden, Massachusetts
- Died: August 16, 2010 (aged 68) Boston, Massachusetts
- Resting place: Forest Dale Cemetery, Malden
- Party: Democratic
- Spouse: Janice
- Children: 11
- Parent(s): Henry G. and Catherine Fallon
- Relatives: Christopher Fallon (brother)
- Education: Malden Catholic High School, Boston College, Suffolk University Law School
- Awards: ARCOM, AAM, ARCAM, KDSM, OSR

Military service
- Branch/service: United States Army, United States Army Reserve
- Years of service: 8
- Rank: Captain

Thomas Henry Fallon (16 February 1942 – 16 August 2010) was a Massachusetts educator, lawyer, politician who served as the Mayor of Malden, Massachusetts from 1982 to 1986, and United States Administrative Law Judge for the Social Security Administration from 1994 to 2010.

== Early life and education ==
Born February 16, 1942 in Malden, Massachusetts, Thomas H. Fallon attended the Immaculate Conception Parish School and Malden Catholic High School. After graduating, Thomas attended Boston College where he achieved a B.A. in English and was commissioned a Second Lieutenant of the United States Army. Fallon served active duty overseas as a Field Artillery Officer of the United States Army and later remained in the United States Army Reserves. After overseas service, Fallon taught English at Woburn Memorial High School. While doing so, Thomas achieved a law degree from Suffolk University Law School and was admitted to the Massachusetts Bar Association in 1971.

== Career ==
Thomas H. Fallon served Malden from 1971 to 1986. He served as a United States Administrative Law Judge for the Social Security Administration from 1994 until the time of his death.

Thomas H. Fallon was elected to the Malden School Committee in 1971. From 1972 to 1973, Thomas Fallon served as an Assistant Register of Probate for Middlesex County, and in 1973 he began serving as Assistant City Solicitor for the City of Malden. He also established a private law practice in Malden.

He served as Chairman for an eight-year term. After serving the School Committee, including two terms as Chairman, Thomas Fallon was elected Mayor of Malden from 1982 to 1986. This was at a difficult time, as cities and towns statewide were facing cuts when the tax-limiting law, Proposition 2-1/2, took effect in 1982.

As the Mayor of Malden, Thomas Fallon established a Human Rights Commission and spearheaded adoption of the first human rights ordinance in Malden and the appointment of the City's first Affirmative Action Officer.

== Organisational affiliations ==
Fallon was a lifetime member of the Disabled American Veterans, the Veterans of Foreign Wars, Malden Post No. 639, the Reserve Officers Association, and the Association of First Corps of Cadets. He was a past Council Member of the Middlesex County Bar Association, and a member and past director of the Kiwanis Club of Malden. He was also a former Arbitrator-Panel Member for the American Arbitration Association.

== Personal life ==
He was the son of the late Malden Police Sergeant Henry G. Fallon and the late Catherine Fallon, who had four children.

== Notes ==
Political offices
Preceded by James S. Conway	Mayor of Malden, Massachusetts; 1982–1986	Succeeded by James S. Conway
