= Funk's Grove Township, McLean County, Illinois =

Funk's Grove Township
- Township
- Location in McLean County

- McLean County's location in Illinois
- Coordinates: 40.363252°N 89.111827°W
- Country: United States
- State: Illinois
- County: McLean
- Established: November 3, 1857

Area
  - Total: 48.21 sq mi (124.9 km^{2})
  - Land: 48.21 sq mi (124.9 km^{2})
  - Water: 0 sq mi (0 km^{2}) 0%

Population (2010)
  - Total: 245
  - Density: 5.1/sq mi (2.0/km^{2})
- Time zone: UTC-6 (CST)
  - Summer (DST): UTC-5 (CDT)

Funk's Grove Township is a township in McLean County, Illinois. As of the 2010 census, its population was 245 and it contained 105 housing units.

== Geography ==
According to the 2010 census, the township has a total area of 48.21 square miles (124.9 km^{2}), all land.
