= Isaac Funk =

American politician (1797–1865)

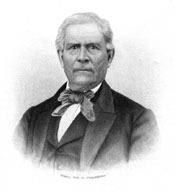

Member of the Illinois Senate from the 10th district
- In office 1862 – 1865
- Preceded by: William Berry
- Succeeded by: William H. Cheney

Personal details
- Born: November 17, 1797 Clark County, Kentucky
- Died: January 29, 1865 (aged 67) Bloomington, Illinois
- Party: Republican
- Profession: Rancher
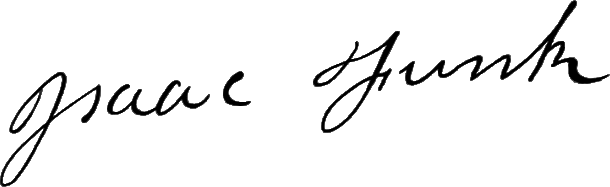
- Signature

Isaac Funk (November 17, 1797 – January 29, 1865) was an American rancher and politician, originally from Kentucky. In the 1820s, he founded Funks Grove, Illinois, in McLean County, Illinois, with his brother and became a prominent cattle trader. Funk was elected to one term in the Illinois House of Representatives in 1840. Despite several financial setbacks, Funk remained one of the wealthiest settlers in the area. He served in the Illinois Senate in the 1860s and died before his second term was complete. He was the patriarch of the Funk family and co-founded Illinois Wesleyan University.

== Biography ==
Isaac Funk was born on November 17, 1797, in Clark County, Kentucky, to Adam and Sarah (Moore) Funk. He was one of nine children and received little schooling. In 1807, he moved with his family to Fayette County, Ohio. In 1821, Funk left his family to work at the Kanawha Salt Works in Virginia for a year. He then returned to Ohio, working as a laborer on a farm. In April 1824, Funk moved to Sangamon County, Illinois. His stay was brief, and he moved to McLean County, becoming one of the county's first settlers. There, he established Funks Grove, Illinois, with his brother Absalom. He and his brother began a successful business raising cattle and farming.

By the 1830s, the Funks were among the richest settlers in the area. However, they lost half of their fortune in the Panic of 1837. The brothers dissolved their partnership the next year. Funk continued to rear cattle and slowly rebuilt his fortune. He was elected to the Illinois House of Representatives in 1840, ostensibly as a Whig, serving one two-year term. He again met financial hardship during the Great Flood of 1844, when many of his cattle died. He was named to the Board of Trustees of Illinois Wesleyan University in 1850 as one of its original founders.

Funk again rebuilt his wealth and was able to build a large house in the 1860s. In 1862, Funk was appointed to fill the Illinois Senate term of Richard J. Oglesby, who resigned to fight in the Civil War. By this point, Funk was affiliated with the new Republican Party. Funk was elected to a second two-year term in 1864.

Funk was a Whig before becoming a Republican. He was a friend of Abraham Lincoln and worked in his presidential campaign of 1860. Isaac Funk, along with his attorney and friend, Abraham Lincoln, were responsible for bringing the Chicago & Alton Railroad through the Bloomington area, sidetracking it from its planned route through Peoria.

Funk married Cassandra Sharp in June 1826. They had ten children. Funk died on January 29, 1865, in Bloomington, Illinois. He fell ill with erysipelas and diphtheria the previous day at his home after returning from a legislative session. His wife died later that day. He was buried in Funks Grove Cemetery (Funks Grove, Illinois). Although he left no formal will and testament, his children donated $10,000 to create the Isaac Funk Professorship of Agriculture at Illinois Wesleyan. Funk was named to the Farmers' Hall of Fame at the University of Illinois and a portrait of him was hung there in 1913.

=== Funk family ===
Isaac Funk was the patriarch of the Funk family, a mainstay in Illinois and American politics. His eldest son George Washington assumed most of his business interests and was later elected to the Illinois House. His fourth son, Duncan McArthur, served three terms in the Illinois House.Fifth son Marquis De LaFayette served a term in the state house and then two terms in the state senate. He was the father of Eugene Funk, a prominent businessman and member of the Illinois Board of Agricultural Advisors. Seventh son, Benjamin F. Funk, was elected to the United States House of Representatives. Benjamin's Funk's son Frank H. also served in the U.S. House. Only daughter Sarah married Leonidas H. Kerrick, who served in the Illinois House and was a trustee at the University of Illinois.
