= Funks Grove, Illinois =

- Unincorporated community
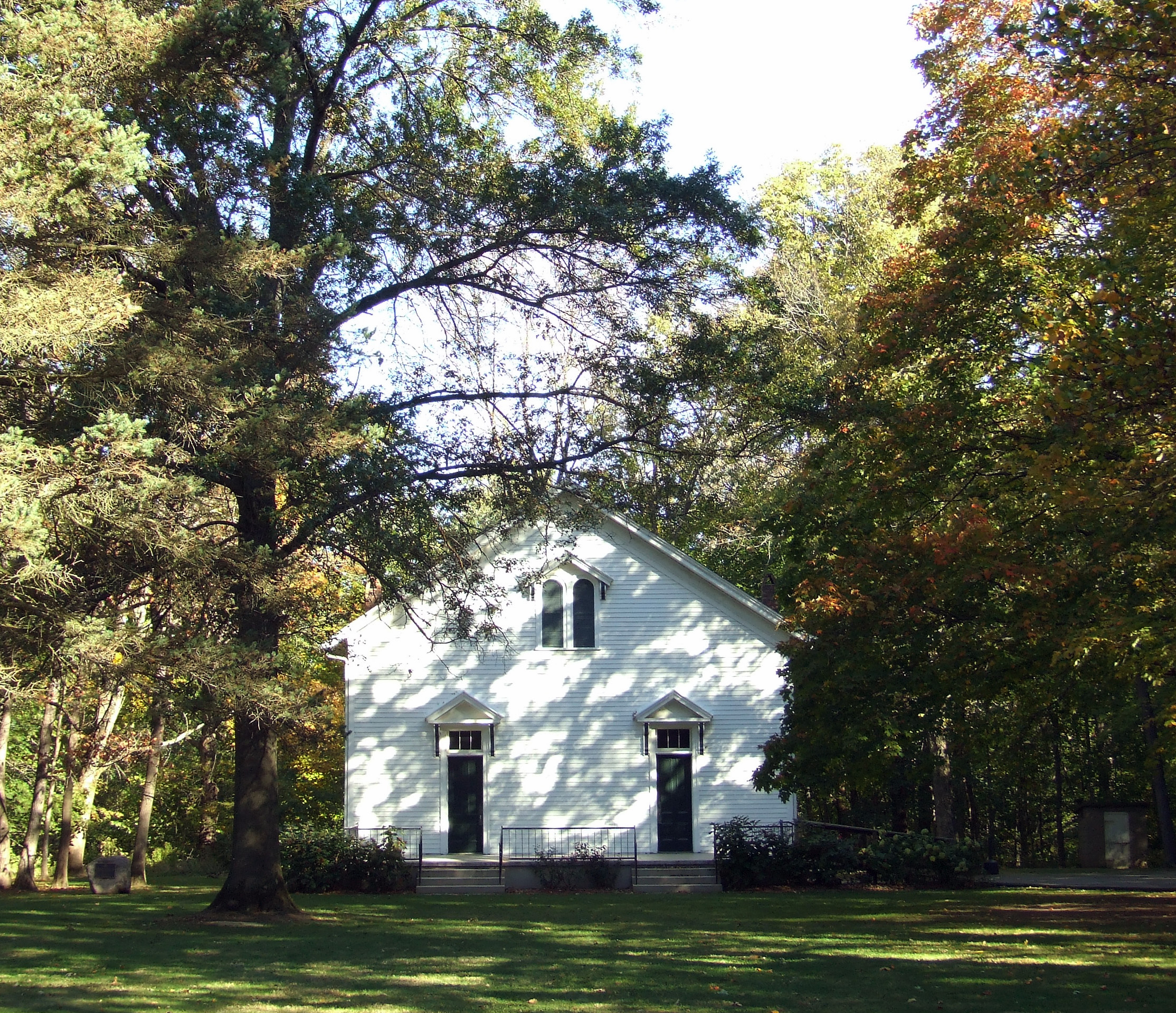
- Funks Grove Chapel

- Location within Illinois Location within the United States
- Coordinates: 40°21′49″N 89°06′52″W
- Country: United States
- State: Illinois
- County: McLean
- Named for: Isaac Funk
- Elevation: 692 ft (211 m)
- Time zone: UTC-6 (Central (CST))
  - Summer (DST): UTC-5 (CDT)
- Area code: 309
- GNIS feature ID: 422723

Funks Grove is a historic unincorporated community on U.S. Route 66 in McLean County, Illinois, United States, southwest of Bloomington. The grove for which the settlement is named, Funk's Grove, is a National Natural Landmark, which in turn is named for early settler Isaac Funk.

== Natural history ==
Illinois's Grand Prairie is spotted with groves, small patches of land where local terrain conditions discouraged prairie fires and allow trees to reach maturity. One of these spots is the lower drainage of Timber Creek, a prairie rivulet that forms a tributary of Sugar Creek. All of these creeks eventually form part of the Sangamon River drainage of the Illinois River.

The banks of Timber Creek, in early historic times, were thickly forested with white oaks, bur oaks, and sugar maple trees. The white oak became the state tree of Illinois, while the sugar maples were used by local Illini Native Americans to make springtime maple syrup and maple sugar.

Maple sweetening was highly prized among early Euro-American settlers, and as early as 1824 Isaac Funk settled here. The Funk family began to sell sirup commercially in 1891, and the family continues to control and harvest much of the grove as of 2008.

=== Funks Grove today ===
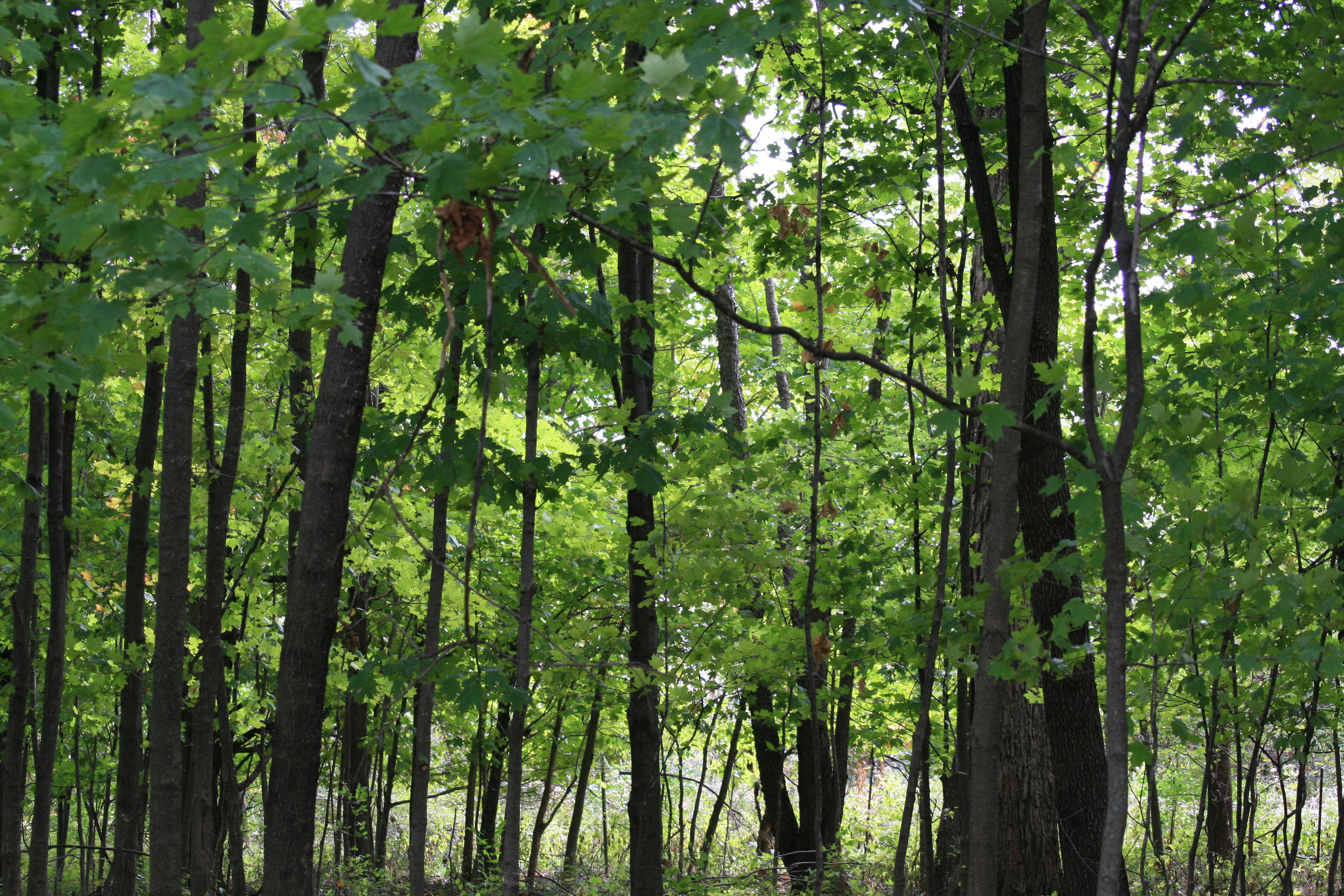
Funks Grove Nature area in Illinois

An 18.6-acre (7.5 ha) parcel within the largely privately-owned grove was dedicated by the state of Illinois in 1985 as the Funk's Grove Nature Preserve.

Due to fire suppression, the makeup of tree life in Funk's Grove is changing from historic times, with the original oaks not reproducing themselves naturally.

Funks Grove continues to be a favorite landmark for users of historic U.S. Route 66, which is signed in McLean County as it passes through the grove. In addition, a rest stop lies on the edge of the grove on Interstate 55 at Illinois Milepost 149. The rest stop contains some memorabilia of the grove.

=== Funks Grove Nature Spaces ===
Funks Grove Nature Spaces opened in October 2004 and is run by a non-profit organization. Originally called Sugar Grove Nature Center, it was renamed in April 2024. It features a recreated tallgrass prairie and old-growth grove with trails to view native plants and wildlife; nature play spaces; bird and wildlife viewing spaces; and more.
