= Trial of Patrick Eugene Prendergast =

1893 proceedings in Cook County, Illinois

People v. Prendergast
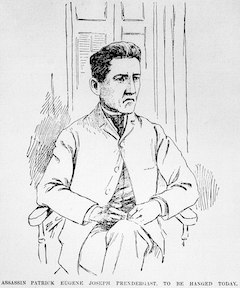
- Illustration of Prendergast during the trial
- Court: Cook County Criminal Court
- Started: December 6, 1893
- Decided: December 29, 1893
- Verdict: Jury found criminal defendant (Patrick Eugene Prendergast) guilty of murdering Carter Harrison III; Prendergast was sentenced to death
- Charge: Murder in the first-degree

Case history
- Subsequent actions: A sanity proceeding was held and found that Prendergast was not currently experiencing insanity (allowing his execution to be carried-out); Prendergast was executed

Court membership
- Judge sitting: Theodore Brentano (of the Superior Court of Cook County)

Case opinions
- Decision by: Jury verdict

The trial of Patrick Eugene Prendergast was held in December 1893 in the Cook County Criminal Court. Prendergast was tried on the charge of murder in the first degree for his actions in having assassinated Carter Harrison III (mayor of Chicago). Prendergast had been motivated to assassinate Harrison by a delusion: Prendergast held that he was entitled to be appointed the city's corporation counsel (a role which he held no qualification for), and had been wrongfully deprived by Harrison of such an appointment. The central question in dispute during the trial was the state of Prendergast's sanity as it related to the commission of Harrison's killing. Prendergast's defense attorneys entered a plea in his defense that he was not guilty by reason of insanity. They did not contest that Prendergast had killed Harrison, instead offering the defense that he had done so while under the control of an insanity that legally rendered him non-culpable for the murder. Prosecutors, including Jacob J. Kern (the Cook County state's attorney) and lead prosecutor A. S. Trude, argued that Prendergast had been sane and was culpable of murdering Harrison. The trial was presided by Judge Theodore Brentano of the Superior Court of Cook County. The jury delivered a verdict finding Prendergast guilty beyond a reasonable doubt, and sentenced him to death by hanging.

Harrison's assassination had been a major news item, and the trial attracted great attention. Public sentiment was unsympathetic towards Prendergast, and contemporary discourse widely disbelieved the argument that had been made in his defense. United States news media and leading figures in its politics and business lauded Prendergast's conviction and sentencing. The popular view expressed was that his execution would serve as an example to deter other "cranks" from carrying out similar acts of violence against government officials. In contrast to contemporary discourse on the trial, modern retrospectives often believe Prendergast to have been insane, and the jury to have been incorrect in its judgement that he was not.

After he was sentenced to be executed, attorneys Clarence Darrow, James S. Harlan, and Stephen S. Gregory represented Prendergast in efforts to appeal this sentence. A petition was granted for an inquiry to determine the current state of Prendergast's sanity. At the time, Illinois had a law which forbade the state from carrying out the execution of individuals currently suffering from insanity. This statute protected those that had become insane subsequent to their commission of crime from being executed until such a time that they were determined to be rid of their insanity. The jury in this inquiry found Prendergast to be currently sane, and he was executed by hanging on July 13, 1894.

The trial was considered one of the most remarkable trials of the nineteenth century.

== Background ==
=== Relevant contemporary legal doctrine on insanity ===
At the time of the trial, courts in the United States used the M'Naghten rules (derived from British precedent established in the year 1843) as their test for criminal insanity. In the state of Illinois (as well as other parts of the United States) this was supplemented by doctrine centered on the concept of irresistible impulse, which considered that simple knowledge of "right and wrong" was insufficient to prove sanity in cases in which there was still not a possibility of self-control. While parts of the United States were already employing the concept of diminished capacity, Illinois had not formally adopted it (and would not until decades later).

At the time, expert witnesses for matters of sanity tended to be medical doctors regardless of whether they held any specialty granting them understanding of behavior. The specialized fields of psychiatry and psychology had not yet been properly established. Additionally, nonprofessionals were held by courts as permissible expert witnesses. This meant that a mere "common sense" view of sanity could be admitted as expert opinion. Resultingly, when the prosecution brought a medical doctor to testify that Prendergast's display of fear while jailed was an indication of sanity, the medical doctor was not an alienist (psychiatrist). During the trial, several medical doctors testified on behalf of the prosecution to assert that, while Prendergast was paranoid, he still knew right from wrong and that he was capable of standing trial for the murder. Expert testimony (by the era's understanding of expertise) made up a very large portion of the testimony heard in the trial.

=== Prendergast's life ===
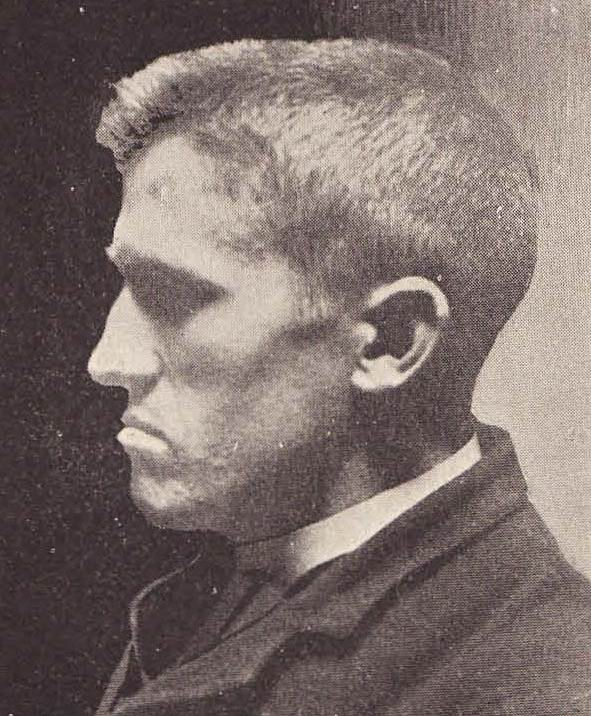
Photograph of Prendergast

Prendergast was born on 6 April 1868 in Cloonamore townland, Inishbofin, an island off the west coast of Ireland. He was baptised in St Colman's Church on 12 April 1868 His parents were Ellen King (1837–1914) and Patrick Prendergast (1840–1886), both of whom were described as teachers at their marriage in Inishbofin on 2 July 1865. His grandfather, William Prendergast, who lost an arm in Pamplona, was an army pensioner who was reported to have died insane. His mother had "repeated attacks of hysterics" and his father died of consumption.

Prendergast was reported to have suffered a severe head injury from a fall at the age of four, from which he was unconscious for a long period of time and suffered vomiting for four weeks after. He was described as a peculiar child, solitary, irritable and excitable, with a poor memory who did poorly in school. Patrick arrived in New York on 20 May 1873, aged 5, traveling with his brother William, aged 8, on the SS France. He left home at 16 because of imaginary persecution and by 18 had developed grandiose ideas of his capabilities and became a fanatic for the single-tax promoted by Henry George.

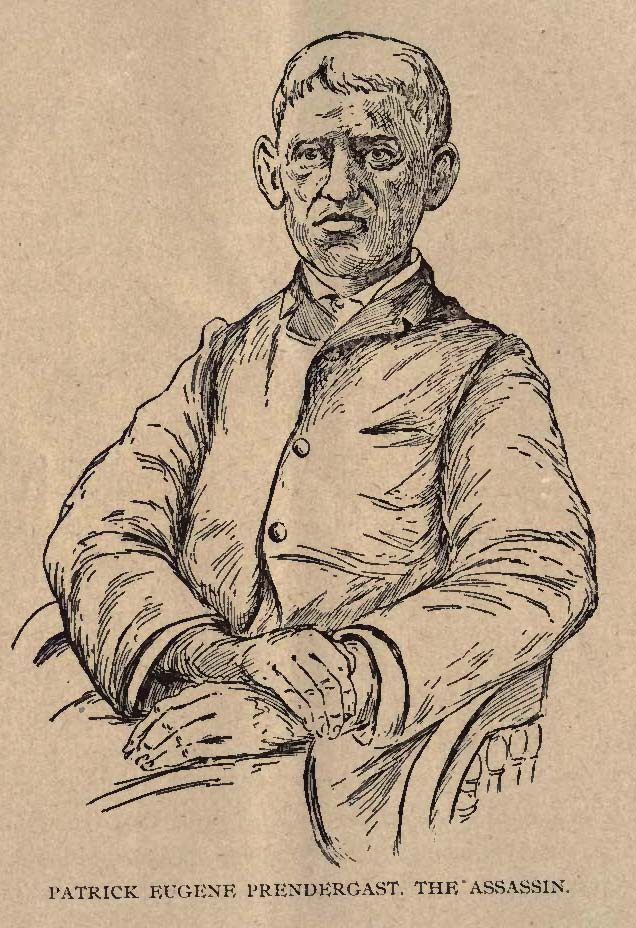
Illustration of Prendergast

Prendergast became a newspaper distributor in Chicago, where he lobbied for improvements in Chicago's railroad level crossings, which he saw as a danger to the public. He supported Carter Harrison's 1890s election campaigns under the delusion that if Harrison won the election, Prendergast himself would receive an appointment as the city's corporation counsel. Prendergast had a fixation with writing postcards. In order to support Carter Harrison's pursuit to regain the mayoralty, Prendergast sent rambling postcards to prominent Chicagoans urging them to vote for Harrison. Among those who received such a postcard was prominent lawyer A. S. Trude, who would later prosecute the case against Prendergast in the murder trial that followed the assassination. Prendergast sent these postcards in support of Harrison for more than two years before Harrison was successful in winning the 1893 Chicago mayoral election. Prendergast believed that his letters had been responsible for Harrison's success in the election.

Prendergast visited Chicago City Hall under the delusion that he had been appointed corporation counsel by Harrison. After Prendergast was insistent to a clerk that he held the position, he was brought to meet Adolph Kraus, the incumbent corporation counsel, who showed Prendergast his office and teased him by facetiously asking if he wanted the job. While Prendergast did not have the education or qualifications that required for the office, he was nevertheless angered that he had not been appointed by Harrison to it. After Harrison had spent six months in office without appointing him corporation council or granting him any recognition, Prendergast began to desire revenge against Harrison for the perceived slight.

Prendergast wrote threatening letters to both Harrison and Kraus, a fact which was quickly discovered by investigators following the assassination. One letter to Kraus read, "I want your job. Do not be a fool. Resign. Third and final notice."

=== Assassination of Harrison ===
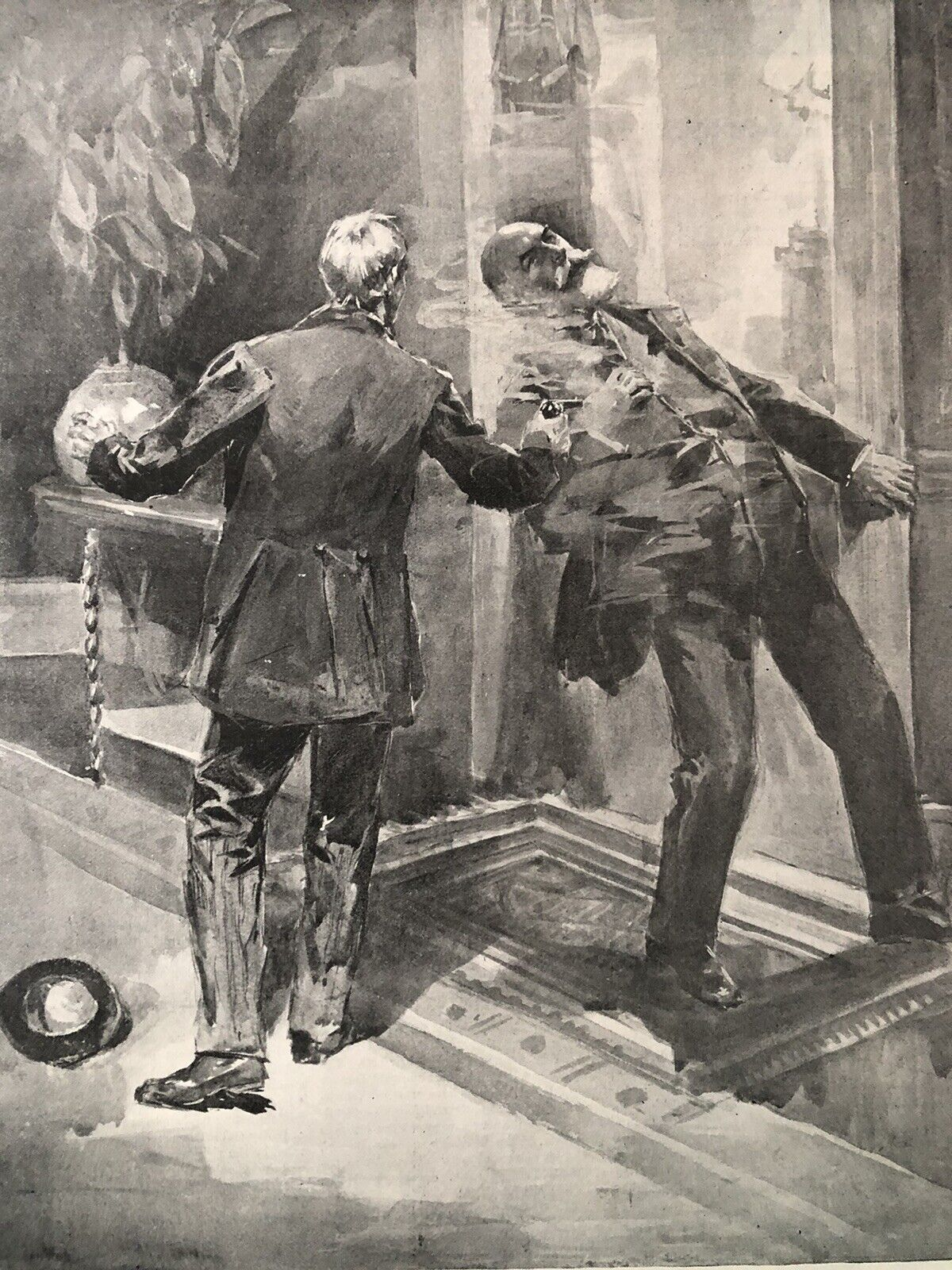
Illustration of Prendergast assassinating Mayor Harrison

Angry at Harrison for having not appointed him to the office, Prendergast visited Harrison at his home on October 28, 1893, after ringing the door bell Prendergast was admitted by a maid who went to wake the mayor (who was taking a nap on a sofa in the parlor). As Harrison stepped into the hallway from the parlor, Prendergast approached and shot the mayor three times with a .38 revolver, hitting him first in the abdomen above the navel, a second time under the left arm with a shot that pierced his heart, and a third time at point-blank range through the left hand.

Hearing the gunfire, Bartha Riesberg (Harrison's coachman), ran towards the site of the shooting with a pistol of his own, firing three times at the escaping Prendergast without hitting him, while avoiding being hit when Prendergast returned fire. Mortally wounded, Harrison died in his home at 8:25 p.m.

The escaping assassin was chased down Ashland Avenue by several citizens and a police officer, who he evaded. Prendergast went to the Des Plaines Street police station, he surrendered himself. He still had the gun in his possession. When interviewed by police, he gave varying stories as to his motive, including the failed appointment and the mayor's failure to elevate train track crossings. The smell of burned powder and the revolver's empty chambers affirmed to the police department that Prendergast was telling the truth.

Prendergast was taken from the Des Plaines Street station to the Central Station, located downtown, where the building was quickly surrounded by a crowd of 5,000 people. Fearing potential mob violence, at 11:15 p.m., Prendergast was stealthily hurried into a wagon and taken to another station located on the North Side of the city, where he was lodged in the county jail pending trial.

Harrison's assassination was met with a significant national reaction, and was one of the most sensationalized events in then-recent memory. Media reports in the days immediately after the assassination questioned Prendergast's sanity. Initially, the public viewed Prendergast as a mentally troubled individual. However, as more about his background was learned, the public began to view him more as an angered egomaniac that had killed as an act of revenge.

== Investigations, indictment, and arraignment ==
=== Harrison's autopsy and coroner's inquest ===
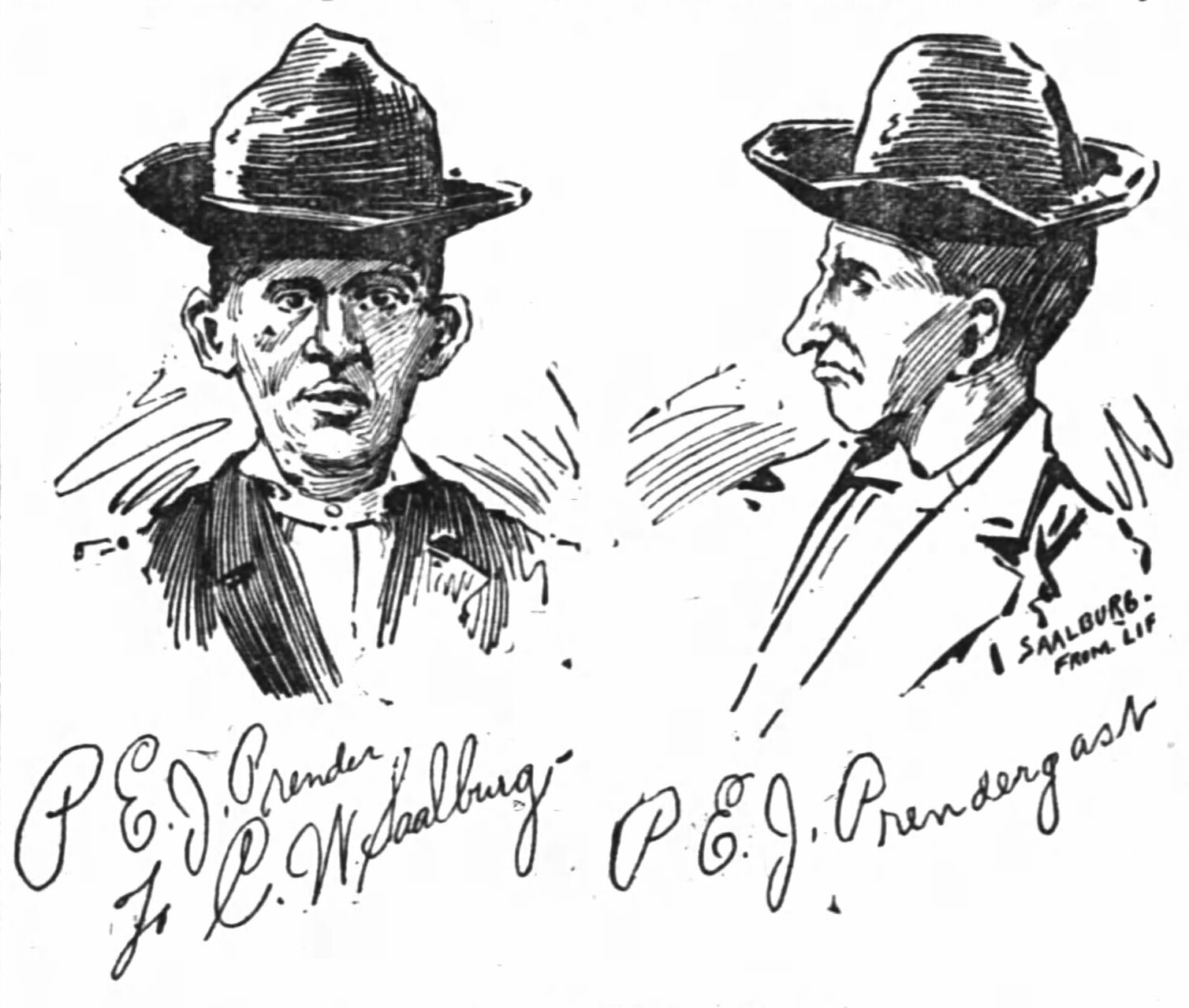
Sketches of Prendergast drawn by an artist while observing him shortly after the assassination

The autopsy of Harrison was conducted by Dr. Ludvig Hektoen and Dr. Louis G. Mitchell. As a witness during the prosecution's presentation in the trial, Mitchell testified that he had found five wounds on Harrison's corpse. He found that one of the first two bullets that had been fired had passed through one of Harrison's finger. He found that the bullets from final three shots lodged in Harrison's corpse: one bullet had been found in the median plane of the body, and that one was found four inches to the right and a little below Harrison's heart, and that another was found in Harrison's back below the tip of his scapula (shoulderblade). The three bullets were extracted, and would be used by prosecutors as evidence in the trial. Mitchell would testify that, besides the bullet wounds, Harrison's body appeared to have been in remarkable health for his age. Hektoen testified in agreement with Mitchell's assessment.

The morning following the assassination, James McHale (the Cook County coroner) conducted the coroner's inquest at the Harrison residence. During the inquest, Prendergast (accompanied by guards) stood in the foyer where the assassination had occurred while witnesses gave testimony in the south back parlor of the residence. The witnesses included Harrison's son William Preston, maid Mary Hansen, and coachman Barth Reisberg. The only other two witnesses interviewed were police sergeants. Before coroner’s jury, witnesses identified Prendergast as the killer and described the events of the previous night.

Prendergast communicated sympathy for Harrison's bereaved family, but refused to speak to the inquest jurors.

The jurors of the coroner's inquest agreed with the testimony of the witnesses as to the manner of Harrison's death, and decided to remand the matter to a grand jury that had been impaneled.

=== Prendergast's pre-arraignment jailing ===
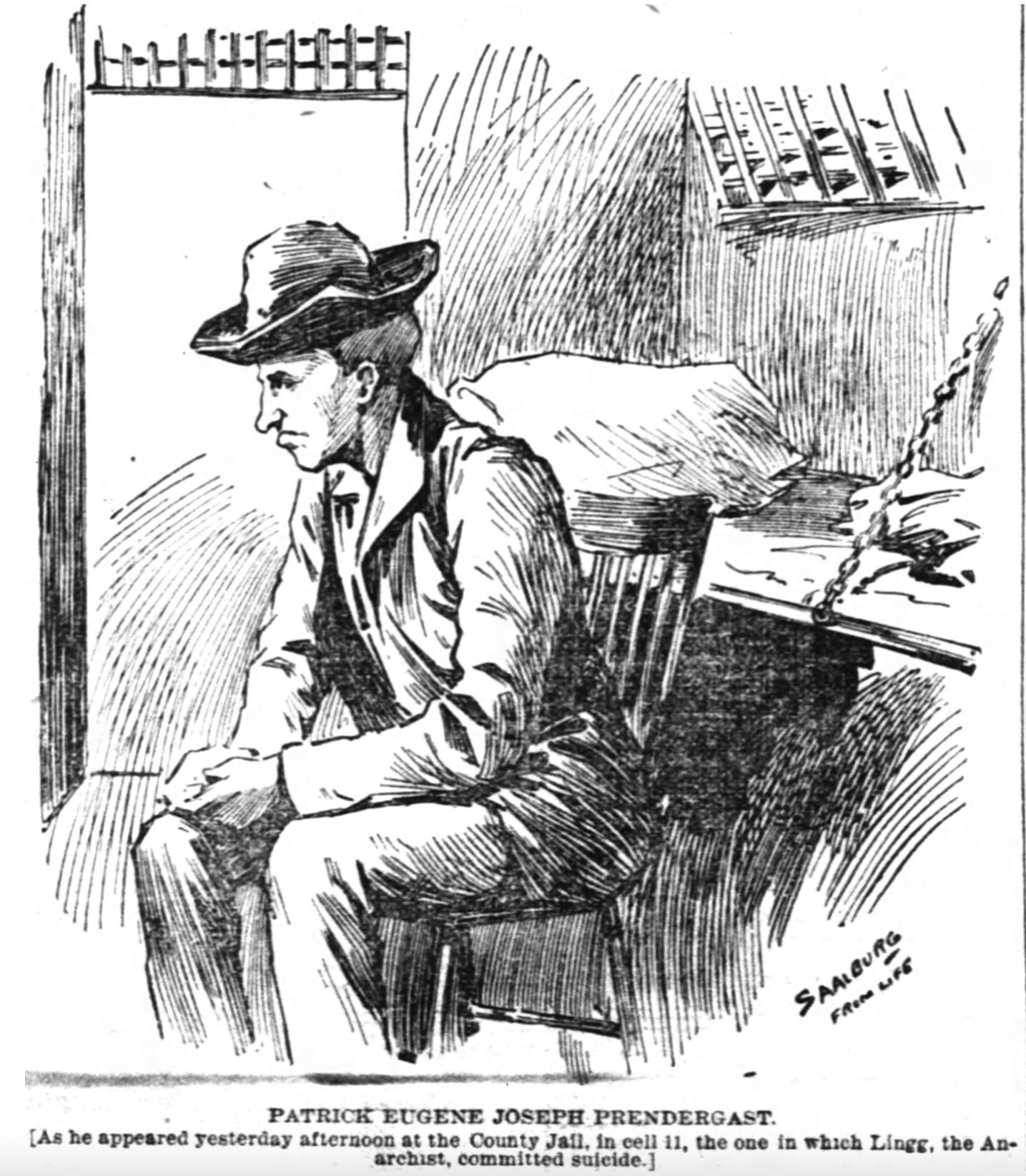
Illustration of Prendergast in cell 11 at the Cook County Jail

After being present for the coroner's inquest, Prendergast was returned to the Cook County Jail, and placed in cell 11 (the same cell where Louis Lingg had famously committed suicide only years earlier). At the jail, Prendergast was reportedly subject to regular harassment (Note: A November 1, 1893 news story reported "Prendergast, the murderer of Mayor Harrison, is having a rough time in jail. The other prisoners have taken to seizing every opportunity to jeer at the wretch and shrieking imprecations at him, so that exercise outside his cell has been made practically an impossibility." The same news story reported the following impression about Prendergast's reaction to this harassment, "The words of his fellow prisoners affected him strangely. All along, he had apparently labored under the delusion that his companions in crime would look up to him as some sort of king among the. But their frightful denunciations dispelled, today at least, this vagary from the man's mind, and he seemed to understand bitterly that he was abhorred even by the hardened criminals as a cowardly assassin.") from fellow inmates. While at the jail, Prendergast is believed to have crossed paths with fellow detainee George Craig, who was facing trial for the murder of Emma Werner (a seven-year-old girl). That crime had occurred only days into the run of the World's Fair and drew heavy attention. Craig was acquitted.

=== Grand jury indictments and arraignment ===
On November 2, the grand jury approved an indictment of Prendergast for first-degree murder. Thereafter, on the same day, Prendergast was arraigned before Jude Oliver Horton. Prendergast plead "not guilty". He was described as heavily sweating, trembling, "cowering in terror", and having spoken in a near-whisper when giving his plea.

== Attorneys ==
=== Prosecutors ===
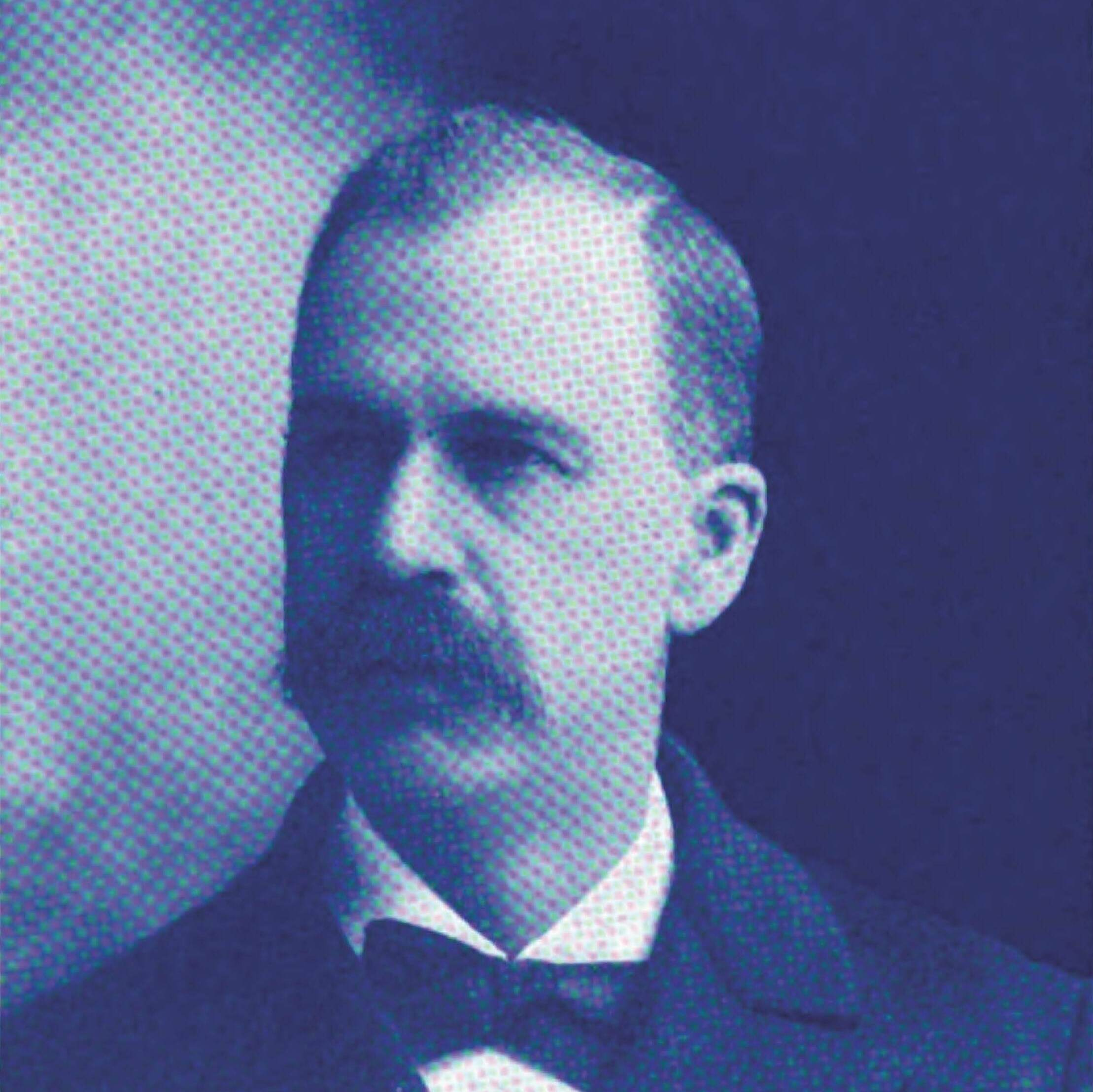
A. S. Trude (pictured) served as the lead prosecutor

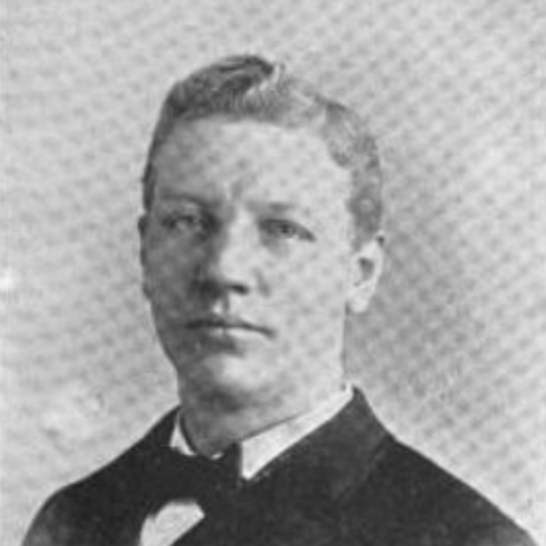
Jacob J. Kern (Cook County state's attorney) was one of the other attorneys for the prosecution

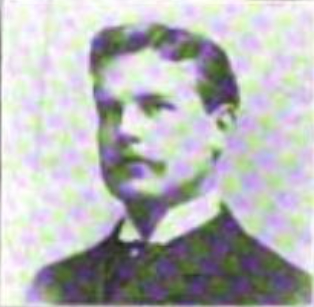
James Todd, assistant state's attorney

A. S. Trude served as the prosecutor, opting to dedicate his time to doing so rather than running for mayor, despite having initially been regarded as a likely front-runner in the 1893 Chicago mayoral special election. Trude agreed to be the lead counsel prosecuting the state's case against Prendergast after having been requested to do so by both the county government and the family of Harrison. This is arguably the most noted matter that Trude worked on in his legal career. Trude was joined by Jacob J. Kern (Cook County state's attorney) as well as assistant state's attorney James Todd.

Trude was one of the most noted attorneys of his time. He had begun practicing law after his admission to the bar in 1871. He had some experience with prosecutions, having been employed by in his early legal career by then-mayor Joseph Medill to prosecute criminal cases on behalf of the city. However, most of Trude's legal work following the end of Medill's mayoralty had been as a civil defense attorney in tort cases, with an emphasis on libel lawsuits. Trude's connection with Medill had led to frequent work defending Medill's Chicago Tribune newspaper in libel and tort lawsuits. He also represented Chicago Times editor Wilbur F. Storey in hundreds of libel and tort lawsuits, (primarily civil cases, but some criminal as well), and further clients such as the Inter Ocean newspaper in libel lawsuits. Trude had also been the solicitor to Michael Cassius McDonald (Chicago political and crime boss) in his 1889 divorce from his wife, Mary. He had also been a legal counsel in many high-profile cases related to the contesting of wills, winning cases on the wills of Wilbur F. Storey, Amos J. Snell. While he did provide some representation in criminal trials, and was very successful in the cases he argued, besides his early-1870s prosecutorial work for the municipal government of Chicago he had almost only represented defendants in criminal trials.

Todd graduated from the Chicago College of Law in 1890, and had been hired to his position as an assistant state's attorney in February 1893. By the time of Prendergast's murder trial, he had prosecuted twenty murder cases, winning nineteen convictions to one acquittal. However, at 28 years of age he was regarded as rather young, and it was noted that only five years earlier he had been a railroad conductor for the Pullman Company. He would be regarded to have conducted himself strongly in the Prendergast trial.

=== Defense attorneys ===
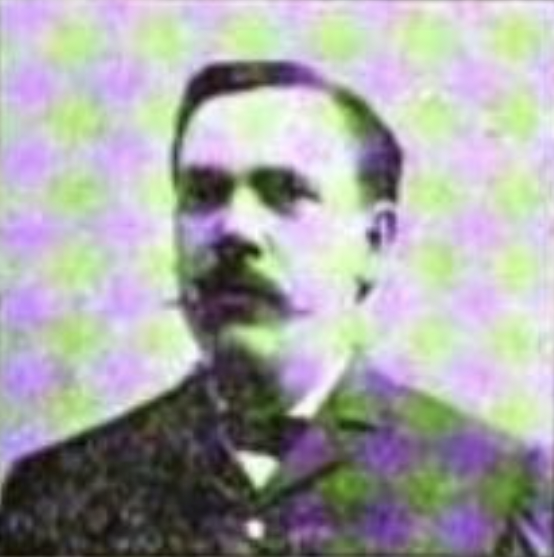
Richard A. Wade, lead defense attorney (court-appointed)

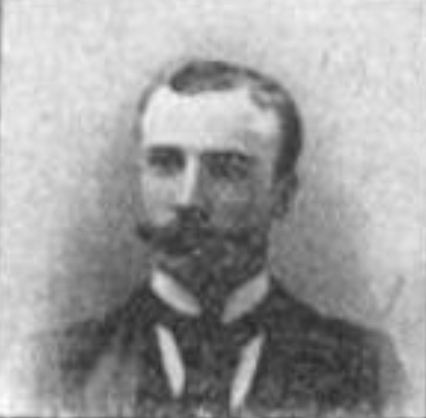
John Heron (privately-hired defense attorney)

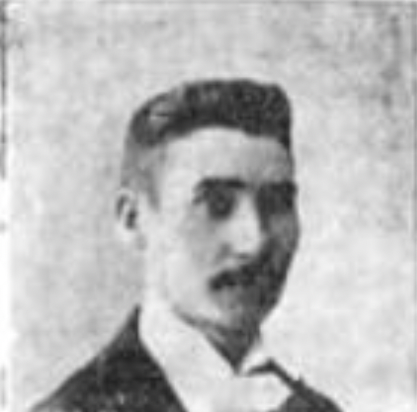
John T. McGoorty (privately-hired defense attorney)

Prendergast was assigned Robert Essex and Richard A. Wade as court-appointed defense attorneys. Wade, whose primary experience was in claims work for the Pennsylvania Railroad, served as his lead defense attorney during the murder trial. By the time the trial began, Prendergast's legal team had grown, with his brother having hired John T. McGoorty and John Heron to join the court-appointed attorneys. Prendergast requested to represent himself pro se, but Judge Brentano refused to allow that.

Wade previously served as the deputy sheriff of Menard County, Illinois in the early 1870s, which familiarized him with the court system. In 1874, he enrolled at Illinois Wesleyan University where he completed the school's law course. He worked in a leading law office of Bloomington, Illinois briefly before moving to Chicago and practicing law there. He was involved in a number of prominent cases prior to Prendergast's As a defense attorney, he came into prominence with his successful defense of Dr. Westerberger, which was a prominently covered case. He also represented Dennis Callihan (an associate of Disney La Selle, aka "Lord Beresford" –a notable swindler) in an extradition case. He was involved in a nationally-prominent case of Phillip DeLacy v. Brooklyn Jockey Club.

Robert Essex was approximately 29 years of age. He was educated at Saint Louis University and Pennsylvania Military College; and studied law at The Abbott School in Maine and a law firm in Grant City, Missouri. He had been admitted to the bar in Missouri in 1887. He had moved to Chicago in 1892, and had only just been admitted to the Illinois bar in 1893.

Heron was approximately 29 years of age, and had only been admitted to practice by Chicago's bar association earlier in 1893. He had only six months of practice as a lawyer prior to the start of the trial. McGoorty was 27 years of age, and had been admitted by the Illinois bar in June 1892. He was regarded to be a strong orator. Both Heron and McGoorty would be regarded as having performed promisingly during the trial.

== Court officials ==
Fred A. Busse was one of the bailiffs assigned to the courtroom during the trial. Busse would subsequently serve as mayor of Chicago from 1907 through 1911. Jail Clerk Benjamin Price was tasked with Prendergast's transport. Price would be called to the stand during the trial to testify about Prendergast. Other court officials involved in the courtroom included Court Clerk Fitzgerald.

== Continuance and reassigning of judge ==
=== November 6 session (presided by Judge Dunne), granting of a continuance ===
Illustration of Cook County State's Attorney Kern speaking during the November 6 court session

Illustration of defense attorney Wade (left) and Prednergast during the November 6 court session

The criminal jury trial against Prendergast for Harrison's murder took place in the Cook County Criminal Court. The trial was originally scheduled to begin on November 6, 1893, with Judge Edward Fitzsimmons Dunne to preside. Dunne would in subsequently garner political note in the 20th century, serving a term as mayor of Chicago (winning election in 1905 but losing re-election in 1907), and a term as governor of Illinois (winning election in 1912, but losing re-election in 1916). (Note: Dunne would coincidentally twice run against Harrison's own son, Carter Harrison IV, in campaigns for the Democratic Party's mayoral nomination (defeating a challenge from the younger Harrison in 1907, but being defeated in a direct primary by the younger Harrison in 1911))

In the brief session November 6 before Dunne, the defense argued that it lacked the time to prepare, and successfully requested a continuance from the court. This delayed the scheduled start of the trial to November 27.

The November 6 proceeding began around 11am local time, with Jailor Moris escorting Prendergast into the courtroom. The Chicago Inter Ocean observed of the defendant's appearance,

Prendergast had dressed himself to the best of his ability. His short, red hair, cut pompadour, was freshly brushed and stood erect. He wore a clean shirt and collar. His black sack coat was buttoned tightly around his spare form. He held his head erect with an insolent grin playing upon his face as he passed down the narrow aisle to a chair in front of the bar.

When Judge Dunne asked Prendergast to answer whether he was represented by counsel, Prendergast did not answer. Morris offered an answer on his behalf remarking, "I think he is, your Honor." Wade then stepped forward to inform that court that he and Essex would be representing the defendant. State's Attorney Kern informed that court that it was prepared to proceed to trial. Wade informed the court (Note: "I was only engaged in this case late Sunday night by a brother of the defendant, and Mr. Essex, who had been previously retained, I never saw the accused in my life before he was brought into this courtroom. This is a serious case, and time is required to prepare a defense. I have had no opportunity to talk with the prisoner, and therefore we are entirely unprepared to go to trial. I think we should have at least four weeks to prepare this case. We desire to bring witnesses here from a distant State who knew this prisoner in his boyhood, and have known him for years, to prove what his condition has been. It will take time to do that. The only living relatives Prendergast has are his mother and brother, and they are poor. It will require some money to defend this case, and they should be given time to obtain it.") that the defense was not prepared.

State's Attorney Kern strongly objected to the defense's request for a month-long continuance until December 4. He conceded that he would be amenable to what he considered a reasonable length of continuance, suggesting two weeks. After Judge Dunne offered to meet both sides halfway with a three week continuance until November 27, the state acquiesced.

In addition to the granting of a continuance, the brief session also saw the defense give unofficial indication that it intended to argue a defense of insanity. When the two sides were arguing about a potential continuance, State's Attorney Kern had suggested, "I presume Prendergast's defense is insanity; it's either that or nothing," to which Wade interjected with the answer, "It's insanity".

Many who had hoped to catch a glimpse of the hearing had heeded speculation that it was going to be held at the City–County Building in the city's downtown. A large crowd gathered at that building in hopes of catching a glimpse of the defendant. The speculation that the hearing would be held at the City–County Building was fueled by Dunne having days earlier heard other cases in a courtroom at that building. However, the November 6 hearing of the Prendergast trial was instead held in a court room on the city's North Side, leaving the curious crowd of onlookers that had gathered downtown disappointed.

=== Reassignment of trial to Judge Brentano ===
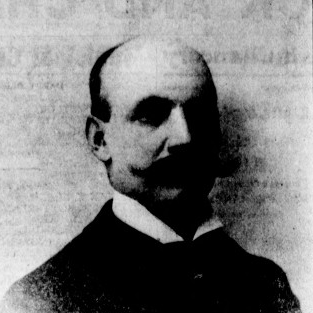
Judge Theodore Brentano (pictured, circa 1909) presided over the trial

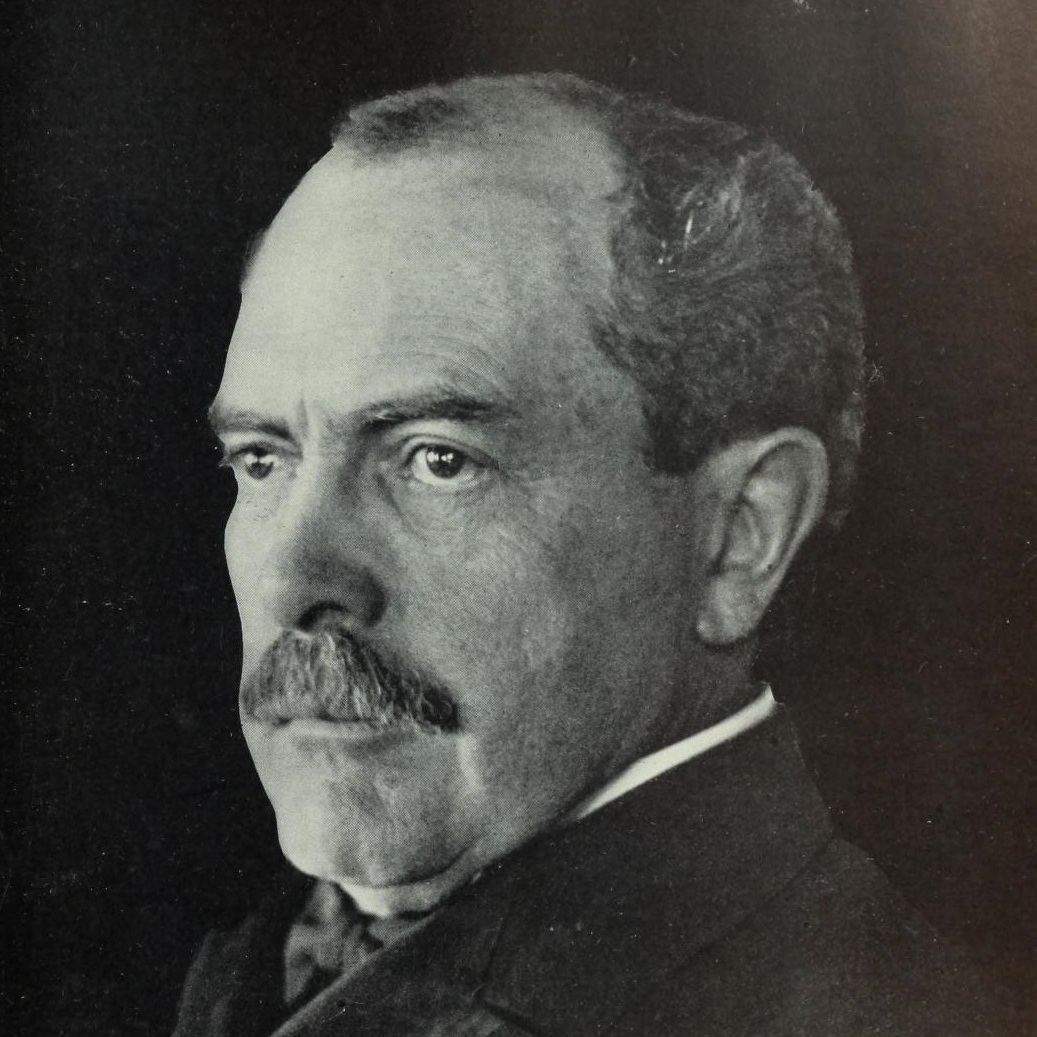
Judge Edward Fitzsimmons Dunne had originally been assigned the trial, before delays

After a brief further delay, the trial began on December 6, 1893, being presided over by Judge Theodore Brentano. Brentano (and not Dunne) presided due to the fact that Dunne had been rotated out of his criminal court assignment. At the time, the Cook County Criminal Court was presided over by judges of the Cook County Superior Court and Cook County Circuit Court, whose duties on the criminal court only lasted one month at a time.

Brentano was 39 years of age during the trial. American-born, he studied abroad in Europe during his high school years, and received his legal education at the National University School of Law in Washington, D.C. He had been elected to the Cook County Superior Court in November 1890.

== Jury selection ==
Jury selection began on December 6. It proved challenging, and lasted a week. Due to the high prominence of Harrison's assassination as a news item, the defense feared prospective jurors may hold preconceived judgement of Prendergast (already believing he held guilt, and had been sane while committing the act). By the time the twelve-member jury was empaneled, 207 prospective jurors had been questioned. This was far more than the fifty prospective jurors that cases at the time typically interviewed before filling a jury. However, there had been fears beforehand that the jury selection could have proven even more severely prolonged. During the process, the defense sought to select jurors that they believed would be more sympathetic to an insanity defense.

On the first day of jury selection, only one slot on the jury was filled. On the second (December 7), three were filled, On the third day (December 8), two further jurors were selected. By this point the jury was half-selected. However, the initial panel of potential jurors had been exhausted, with all other veniremen (potential juror candidates) having been dismissed. A new pool of veniremen were summoned for the following day. On the fourth day (December 9) no jurors were selected. On the fifth day (December 11), three further jurors were selected, and on the sixth day (December 12) the jury was fully selected after three more were selected.

During jury selection, Prendergast regularly interrupted. In one such instance on the third day of jury selection, he voiced his disagreement with a juror's answer to Trude's question about whether he held any opinion about Prendergast's guilt or innocence. After the prospective juror had answered "in one way I think he is guilty, and in another I think he is innocent," Prendergast angrily interjected, "I object to that statement, your honor that in some things he thinks I am guilty and in others innocent. I can be innocent without being insane." Trude goaded Prendergast by responding, "what was that last statement of your's Mr. Prendergast? I didn't catch it," with Prendergast nearly taking this bait until his attorney McGoorty stepped in to object to Trude's engagement with Prendergast, objecting to Judge Brentano, "I object to the state interrogating the defendant." Brentano urged Prendergast to cease interrupting and leave his representation to his four lawyers, telling him, "Mr. Prendergast, your attorneys will guard your interests here."

The members of the selected jury were primarily white-collar workers, including six salesmen, a tailor, a fire insurance agent, a business secretary, a commission purchase agent, and the manager of a factory. All jurors were male.

Members of the jury
| Name | Occupation | Country of origin | Other information |
|---|---|---|---|
| John W. S. Allen | Salesman for Cook, Lynn & Co. | United States | Originally from Michigan |
| A.T. Altfleisch | Clerk (salesman) | Germany | Immigrated to the U.S. the age of 8 |
| J. M. Blanchard | Manager | United States | Lived in the Austin neighborhood of Chicago |
| Adolph Gross | Merchant tailor | Germany | Immigrated to the U.S. at the age of 15 |
| Charles W. Hamilton | Commission purchasing agent | United States | Originally from Michigan, had lived in Chicago for 22 years |
| James H. Van Inwegen | Secretary of the Tiffany Pressed Brick Company | United States | |
| A. Gordon Murray | Dry goods salesman | Scotland | Had lived in Cook County, Illinois for 12 years |
| C.E. Reid | Traveling salesman | United States | Chicago native |
| Jacob Sutter | Wholesale tobacco dealer (salesman) | France | Had lived in Chicago for 18 years |
| Sedgwick Vastine | Fire insurance agent | United States | Lived in the Austin neighborhood of Chicago |
| Alfred Wander | Salesman | United States | Originally from New York, born to parents who were German immigrants |
| William R. White | Manager of the Garden City Portland Cement Paving Company | United States | |

Sutter would be selected as the jury foreman (head juror).

Shortly after the verdict was delivered, juror C. F. Reid commented to reporters about his experience serving on the jury,

It was a serious case we were to decide. But we managed to enjoy ourselves fairly well, and generally had considerable sport after the adjournment of court. Our meals were well served, and were all that could be desired, and, while the confinement was hard on us, still I can't complain.

Shortly after the verdict had been delivered at the end of the trial, Judge Brentano commented on the jury,

It was the most intelligent jury that I ever saw. There was not what you might term a cheap man in the lot. Every one of them was a good representative citizens, and much higher in positions that they hold in the business and social world that the average man who can be security for jury duty.

== Prendergast's conduct during the trial ==
Despite Prendergast's lawyers' efforts to persuade him against interrupting during the trial, he frequently interjected during the proceedings to voice his disagreement with negative characterizations about him. He regularly interrupted to disagree with his own defense attorney's assertions of his insanity.

News reports voiced doubt on whether his unruly behavior was genuine. Reporters drew comparisons between Prendergast and Charles J. Guiteau, noting that Guiteau had carried himself in similar manner during his own trial for the assassination of President Garfield. News reports frequently speculated that Prendergast might be faking his signs of mental instability, merely "play[ing] the crank." Many comparisons had been publicly made between Prendergast and Guiteau after Harrison's assassination, as Guiteau's assassination of Garfield had similarly been motivated by a failure of the president to appoint Guiteau to a patronage position which he perceived himself as being owed. Prendergast personally resented comparisons to Guiteau, viewing Guiteau as beneath him. He made his displeasure with such comparisons well known.

During the jury selection process, when Trude informed potential jurors that the crux of the trial would be the question Prendergast's sanity, and Prendergast expressed agreement with Trude's assertion of the prosecution's view that Prendergast knew "the difference between right and wrong" and was therefore sane and guilty. Trude interjected, "Mr. Trude is right, your honor". This (endorsing the prosecution's central argument for his guilt) led one of his defense attorneys to scold him aloud, urging him to, "shut up".

During the trial Prendergast also often reacted negatively to mere mentions of his name. For instance, on the second day of the trial he objected to the prosecution referring to him simply as "Prendergast", interrupting the opening remarks by Assistant State's Attorney James Todd saying, "I object to being called 'Prendergast'. Let him call me 'Mr. Prendergast' when he refers to me." In one instance during the trial, Prendergast engaged briefly with Trude in an argument related to the concept of "right and wrong".

Per the Chicago Tribune's reporting, on December 19 (during the prosecution's rebuttal), Prendergast exhibited nervous twitching. This twitching was noticed by those in the courtroom. However, after a testimony by experts that an individual could feign the appearance of insanity, Prendergast ceased to twitch.

Shortly after the verdict was delivered, the Chicago Tribune quoted a jury member as telling them that Prendergast's interruptions helped to seal his conviction. The Tribune reported the jury member as recollecting, "One of the principal reasons upon which we based our conclusion was Prendergast's statements in court during Mr. Trude's argument," remarking that, "Prendergast's interruption during the argument and language he used showed that his reasoning faculties were acute, his memory good, and that he regarded himself as being in danger." He opined that "the most unfortunate interruption for [Prendergast] was when he denied details of how the exchange of fire with Harrison's coachman transpired, commenting, "this showed that he remembered clearly the fact relating to the homicide, which is inconsistent with his being the victim of a delusion."

== Prosecution's opening remarks ==
The prosecution's opening remarks, delivered by Assistant State's Attorney Todd, characterized the assassination as an act similarly horrible to the assassinations of presidents Garfield and Lincoln. Todd noted that Prendergast had already confessed to killing Harrison, and that this had been verified by witness identifications of Prendergast as the perpetrator. Todd further asserted that Prendergast was indeed sane, noting that Prendergast's mother had asserted that he was sane when she spoke to news reporters. He argued that Prendergast had been driven by his own narcissism and delusions of personal importance.

== Defense's opening remarks ==
Next, Wade gave the defense's opening remarks. Due to the fact that Prendergast had obviously committed the killing, Wade employed an insanity defense. In his passionate remarks, he stated that Prendergast's family had a history of insanity, and that Prendergast had been "dull" and "hard of comprehension" since his early years in school, that he had a hyperfixation with morbid political ideas from material he had read which had already driven his relatives to plan for and involuntarily commitment of him. He asserted that his relatives (including his mother) would deliver testimony to support these assertions. He also stated that a new science would demonstrate that analysis of Prendergast's skull, body, feet, teeth and ears gave indicators of insanity.

Wade also stated that he would show that in May, June, and July 1893 Prendergast had written letters to religious leaders and U.S. Senators demonstrating insanity, including proclamations of possessing divine authority, giving unsolicited advice pertaining to the individuals' duties. That among the letters Prendergast had written were letters to every U.S. senator who had taken a stance on the matter of a gold standard versus a silver standard. That Prendergast had demonstrated a delusion that he had been given a divine order to ensure the elevation (grade separation) of the city's railroad tracks. Also that esteemed businesspeople had sought to have him restrained from seeing them due to his dangerous lunacy.

Expressing great confidence that he would succeed in making demonstrating Prendergast's insanity, Wade went as far as to say that if at the end of the jury still disbelieved his insanity (and instead continued to believe that he was merely "feigning insanity") after the testimony they would hear, then they indeed should, "hang him".

== Prosecution's presentation ==
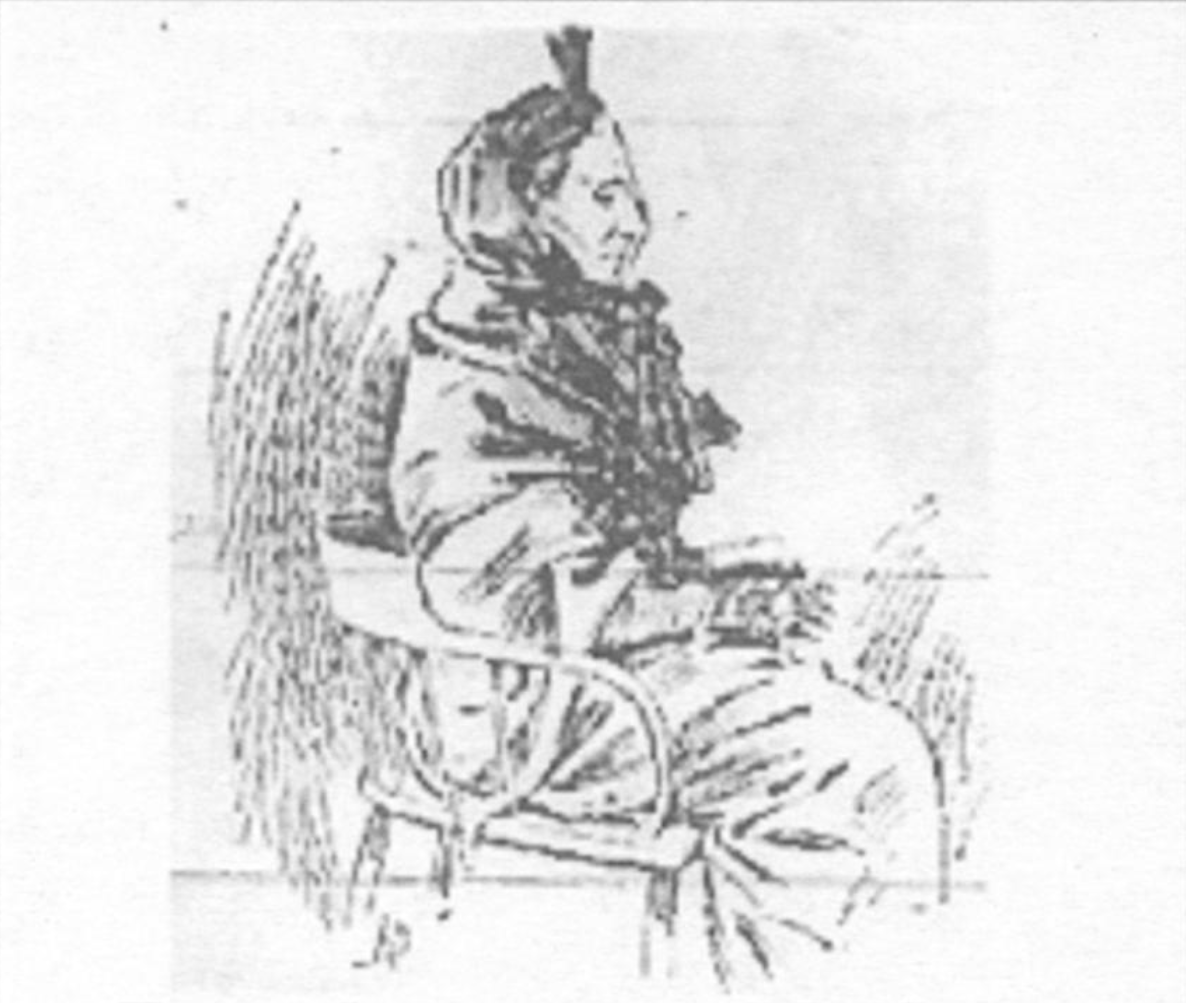
Illustration of Prendergast's mother attending the trial during the prosecution's presentation

After Wade finished the defense's opening statement, the prosecution's arguments began.

The prosecution disagreed with the defense's assertion of insanity, arguing that Prendergast was sane. The prosecutors pointed to the fact that Prendergast had taken special care to keep an empty chamber in his revolver as he carried it around. They argued that this demonstrated rationality because carrying a revolver of that era with a live round under the hammer could cause it to go off if dropped; having the forethought to leave the chamber safely empty demonstrated sanity.

In the two days which followed the end of opening remarks, a parade of witnesses for the prosecution were questioned before the court to establish facts. The prosecution relied primarily on laypeople as witnesses, rather than expert witnesses. Thirty non-medical witnesses were called, many of them being individuals casual connections of Prendergast who they brought to illustrate that Prendergast was sane. This included the judge that had presided over the arraignment, despite the fact that Prendergast had only appeared before that judge for less than ten minutes.

The prosecution's first witnesses included several house staff of Harrison's. The first witness to testify was parlor maid Mary Hansen, who had let Prendergast into the residence on the evening of the murder. Her testimony was followed by the testimonies of Helma Johnson (Harrison's other housemaid), Harrison's cook, and Bartha Reisberg (Harrison's coachman). Also testifying about the circumstances of the night of the assassination was Harrison's son William Preston Harrison.

News reporter Edward P. Stone testified that he had interviewed Prendergast at the Chicago Police Department's Central Station on the night the murder occurred and that Prendergast had divulged details of the murder, including that his motivation for murdering Harrison was both Harrison's failure to appoint him as corporation counsel, as well as his own deeply-held concerns about the need for the city to grade-separate the city's railroad tracks through elevation.

Harrison's daughter Sophie Harrison was called to testify. She was noted to have been highly emotionally overwhelmed while providing testimony about her father's murder. Her emotional state led to the prosecution deciding to cut short their questioning of her. Consequentially, prosecutors opted to keep her testimony short, only asking her questions that established a handful of important facts about the killing. The defense declined to cross examine her. Her testimony was followed by that of Frank A. McDonald, another desk sergeant of the Des Plains police station. McDonald testified that he had overheard Prendergast tell John S. Walsh (an operator at the station) that he had shot Harrison because believed that Harrison had betrayed his confidence. Walsh testified next, and corroborated McDonald's account.

Next to testify were several of Harrison's neighbors, who recounted the mayor's death. Police and jailers testified to Prendergast's behavior after he surrendered and was jailed. The final witnesses of the prosecution were Dr. Louis G. Mitchell and Dr. Ludvig Hektoen, the two doctors that had conducted Harrison's autopsy. Mitchell testified about his findings. Dr. Hektoen's testimony corroborated Mitchell's. The three bullets that had been extracted from Harrison's corpse were produced. The final action in the prosecution's presentation was entering the bullets into evidence. On December 14 at 2:25pm local time, the prosecution rested.

== Defense's presentation ==
=== Lay witnesses testimony during defense's presentation ===
The defense presented many lay witnesses, many were acquaintances of Prendergast that testified to Prendergast's personal history and their belief that he was insane. Such witnesses testified to encounters and interactions that they had had with Prendergast that had informed their belief that he was insane. Witnesses included adult acquaintances, as well as faculty of St. Patrick's Academy (where Prendergast was educated during his pre-adulthood).

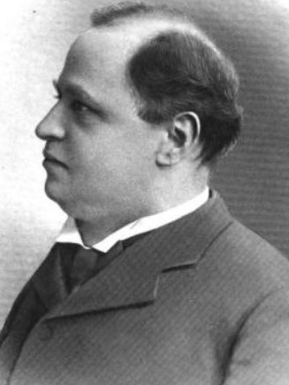
Adolph Kraus (Corporation Counsel of Chicago) testified on both December 14 and December 21

Corporation Counsel Adolph Kraus testified during the defense's presentation as well.. In his testimony, Kraus recounted that four weeks prior to the assassination Prendergast had come to his office to tell him he should resign the office so that Prendergast could assume it and find a way of compelling the elevation of railroad tracks (in order to eliminate grade crossings). Kraus testified to having toyed with Prendergast for his amusement, introducing him to various employees around the Corporation Counsel's office. Testimony corroborating Kraus's account was provided by several employees (Note: corroborating witnesses were Byron Bailey (chief clerk of the Corporation Counsel's office) as well as Maxwell Dickson and T. M. Friedlander (attachés of the same office)) of the office.

==== Testimony of Ellen Prendergast (mother of the defendant) ====
The defense's presentation began on December 14 after the prosecution rested their's. The first witness they called was Prendergast's mother, Ellen Prendergast. They regarded her to be their strongest and most important witness. The purpose of her testimony was to provide evidence that Prendergast was insane. She also established general biographic information about his life, his education, and his employment history. She testified that Prendergast had been a reserved and studious child, but had suffered from a poor memory. Mrs. Prendergast testified that, as a child, Prendergast had also experienced a personality change following his father's death.

She testified that at the age of 16, Prendergast had left home without cause for four weeks, and that not too long after he left school amid his father's poor health to take a job as a courier for Western Union. However, not too long later he had believed himself to be entering a decline in health, and traveled to New Mexico for twelve weeks, upon returning from which he had the appearance of a tramp. She testified that had the age of seventeen, he became more antisocial, and began to demand that he sleep in private rather than share a sleeping quarters with his brother. She also testified that it was around this time had he developed his obsessive fascination with the writings of Henry George. She also testified to his increasing obsession with Henry George's economic philosophies and with religion.

Mrs. Prendergast testified further than roughly a year prior to the trial, she had believed her son was becoming crazy in his obsession with city politics and the matter of elevating railroad tracks above grade. She testified that it was around this time that began expressing his delusional confidence that he would receive an appointment as corporation counsel, and that when she had attempted to reason with him on the matter he became angry and ranted at her before disappearing from her life for the following three months. She testified that he, at some point then, traveled to Wisconsin, only returning in July 1893. She testified that two weeks prior to the assassination, he visited her and asked for her to return to his possession his dumbbells because he wanted to exercise and gain strength in order to provide for his personal defense. She testified that this exchange ended with a tirade in which he mentioned his concern of what he believed to be severe problems in the Catholic Church and told her he had written instructions to all of the priests and to the Archbishop on how to fix. She testified that was the last he had heard from him prior to the assassination.

In cross examination, Trude had Mrs. Prendergast confirm that she had initially commented shortly following the assassination that her son was sane. He also had her confirm that she had never before shared beliefs of her son's insanity prior to the assassination. She admitted that she did not notice that her son had any symptoms of insanity and that nobody had previously told her than they considered his behavior peculiar, with the exception of his more recent obsession with George's single tax theory. Also during the cross-examination, by seeming accident, brought up that Prendergast had been seriously injured as a baby after hitting his head after a fall from a height of four feet, and that this incident had left lasting damage to his eyesight. Trude questioned her further on this, amid which Prendergast lost his temper and shouted, "Trude, you are a scoundrel to talk to my mother that way." A reporter for the Chicago Tribune opined that during the proceedings on December 14, Prendergast had, "exhibited the greatest insolence towards everyone around him, and made running comments on all that occurred."

December 16 (the third day of the defense's presentation) began with Mrs. Prendergast being recalled as a witness to provide further testimony. Her additional testimony pertained to hereditary insanity within the Prendergast family. She testified that her son, the defendant, had a paternal grandfather (William Prendergast) who had suffered periodical bouts of insanity and had been confined to an insane asylum in Ballyclogh, County Cork, Ireland.

==== Testimony of John Prendergast (brother of defendant) ====
John Prendergast, the brother of the defendant, provided testimony about his brother's mental condition and behavior. He testified that Prendergast (the defendant) had carried himself dimly until the age of sixteen, at which age he suddenly began exhibiting intelligence, independence, and egotism. He recalled that, after Prendergast (the defendant) turned twenty, he disappeared, becoming a vagrant for some time. He recalled Prendergast (the defendant) showing up on his door step at 3 in the morning in July looking poorly kept, and when asked where he had disappeared to, he answered that he had wound up in Wisconsin without recollection of how he got there, but with the knowledge that he had traveled there on a mission for the good of mankind. The he also testified that prior to his brother (the defendant) returning, he had spoken with attorney Walter Cooley about his belief that his brother (the defendant) was insane, and that he had again concerned worried and unsure about the whereabouts of his brother (the defendant) during a period leading up to the slaying of Mayor Harrison.

=== Expert witness testimony during the defense's presentation ===
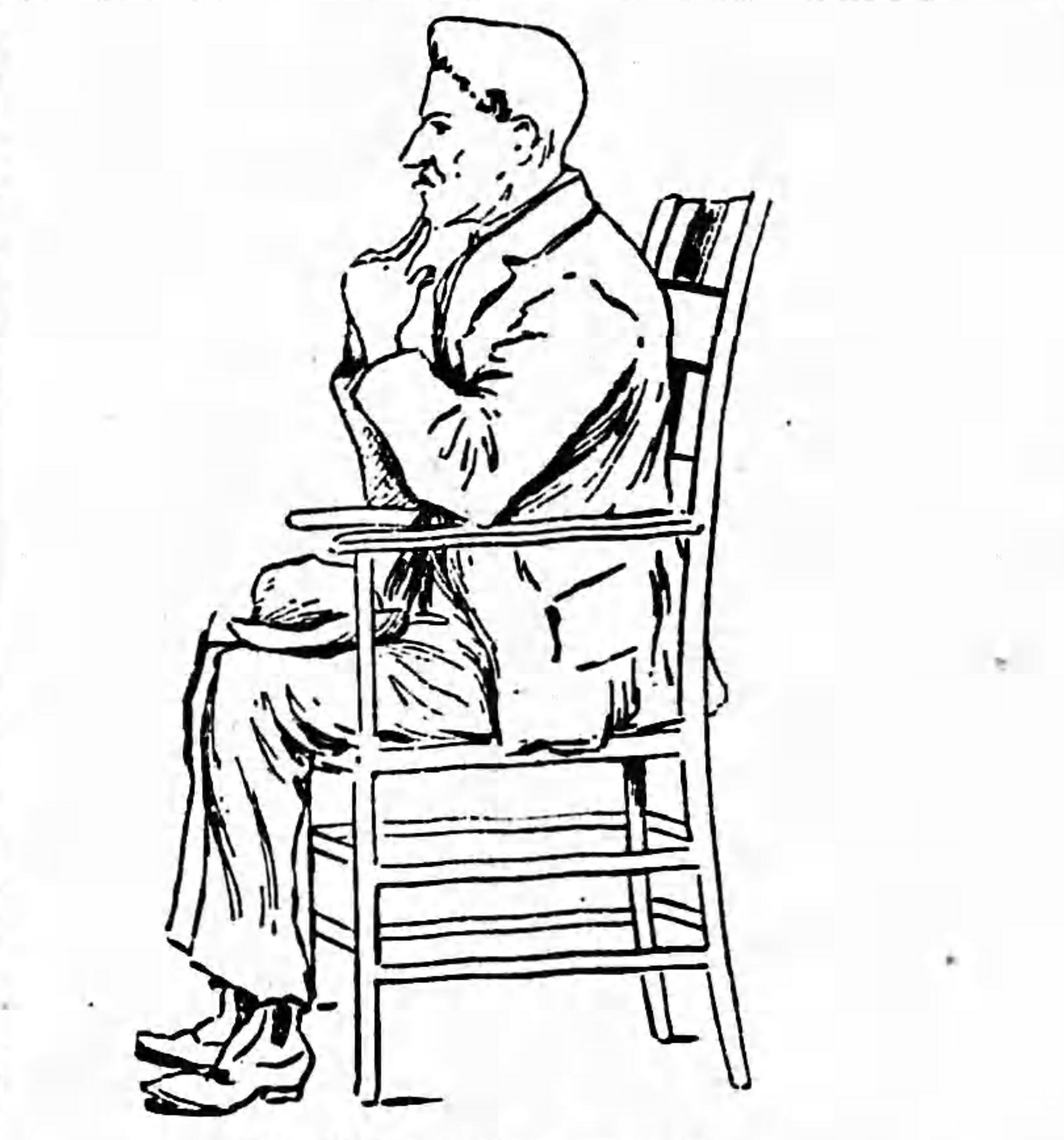
Illustration of Prendergast in the courtroom

==== E. S. Talbot (phrenologist) ====
The first expert witness called by the defense was Dr. E. S. Talbot, who testified that he had discovered a new phrenology-based method to detect insanity. He displayed a plaster cast he had made of Prendergast's jaw, and shared measurements he had taken of Prendergast's head. It was his view that arrested development in the anterior portion of Prendergast's scull (particularly his nasal bones) indicated that Prendergast was afflicted with neurotic degeneration and insanity.

==== Testimony by physicians that had observed Prendergast at the state's behest: Dr. Archibald Church, Dr. D. R. Brower, Dr. John H. Slayer, Dr. F. Kiernan ====
The prosecution had hired a group of physicians to observe Prendergast's conduct during the trial to assess his mental state. However, most of these physicians ultimately did not to share their opinions. Of the six, only one was willing to testify that Prendergast was sane, and thus that was the only of these physicians which the prosecution had brought as a witness. Four of the medical doctors that the prosecution had hired but decided not to call as witnesses were subpoenaed by the defense, but only three testified for them. The three who did so testified on December 18, and told the court that Prendergast was insane and therefore not responsible for his actions in killing Harrison.

There had been much public surprise at the fact that the four of the eight expert witnesses that the prosecution had originally intended to call had become positioned to testify in support of the defense's case. Publicly, the prosecutors insinuated that these doctors may have been bribed. Judge Brentano allowed for jurors to be kept from knowing that several of the doctors testifying for the defense were doctors that the prosecution originally intended to have as witnesses, so long as the prosecution desired to leave this unknown. Judge Brentano disallowed the defense to tell the jury that the prosecution had previously intended to call the same experts witnesses that would now be testifying in support of the defense's position.

Trude was upset that the doctors who the prosecution had previously compensated were now testifying as defense witnesses. He exclaimed to the court,

The State has been tricked....and some of the doctors who will take the stand for the defense are the very doctors who were called together by the State along with others, to formulate a line of prosecution. Some of these men attended the conferences, gave their opinions to the representatives of the State, learned the policy of the prosecution, and now they are to take the stand for the other side armed with every particle of data that the prosecution has gathered. You can say for me that certain organizations have raised money for the defense of the murder of Carter Harrison, and I would not hesitate to say that money has been freely used by the defense in securing expert testimony.

The first of these doctors to testify was Archibald Church. Wade asked Church a long hypothetical which took several-minutes to lay out, describing an individual mirror Prendergast and actions mirror those of Prendergast before asking whether Church what his professional opinion would be on such an individual. Church answered that he would consider such an individual insane, and specified that he would consider them to be suffering paranoia. During the prosecution's cross-examined, he testified that he did not believe phrenology (which Talbot's testimony had been grounded in) to be an entirely reliable means of determining insanity.

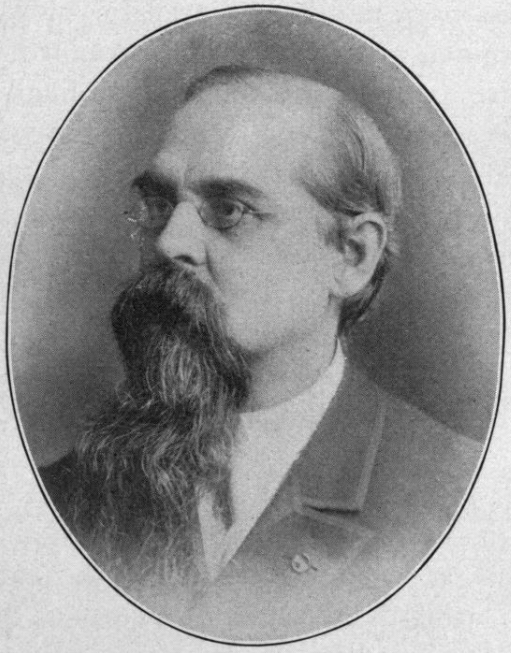
Portrait of Dr. Daniel Roberts Brower, witness

Dr. Daniel Roberts Brower testified that, having twice conducted in-depth medical examinations of Prendergast (which included an examination in which he had Prendergast stropped naked so that he could examine the entire surface of Prendergast's body), he had concluded that Prendergast indeed was insane. His conclusion was that Prendergast was, in specific, suffering from a paranoia causing him to suffer logical delusions of two types: persecutory delusions and self-exaltation. Brower offered the professional opinion that while Prendergast might be responsible for most of his actions, he was not responsible for actions related to his delusions. Dr. John H. Slayter and Dr. F. Kiernan thereafter testified to the same beliefs and facts that Dr. Brower had. Kiernan had years earlier testified as an expert witness in the murder trial of presidential assassin Charles Guiteau.

The following day, the defense continued their presentation by calling Dr. Richard Dewey as a witness. Dewey had previously served as superintendent of the Kankakee Insane Asylum. Wade posed a long hypothetical of an individual mirroring Prendergast's profile and how Dewey would diagnose an individual base off of that description. Dewey was given a type-written copy of the hypothetical to review, and answered that he would infer that such an individual was insane, specifically suffering paranoia or monomania. During cross examination by Trude, however, Dewey answered that Prendergast's acts and speech, Trude extracted answers that were far less favorable to the defense, and undermined the answers Dewey presented in the defense's questioning about Prendergast evidencing insanity and having lacked the knowledge and ability to refrain from killing Harrison.

The defense posited to the same hypothetical it asked to Dewey to Dr. William Bain (a physician) and Dr. Frank Wail (the Assistant Cook County Physician), both offering similar answers a Bain had given in response to the hypothetical. After this, Dr. Church returned to the stand for further testimony, during which he announced that, when also considering evidence beyond his own previous examination of Prendergast alongside Dr. Brower, he would regard Prendergast to be suffering paranoia. The defense had wanted to question an additional doctor, Dr. Mayer, but he could not be found. They hoped to question him the following day, but his whereabouts were also unable to be found then as well.

== Prosecution's rebuttal ==
=== Lay witness testimony during prosecution's rebuttal ===
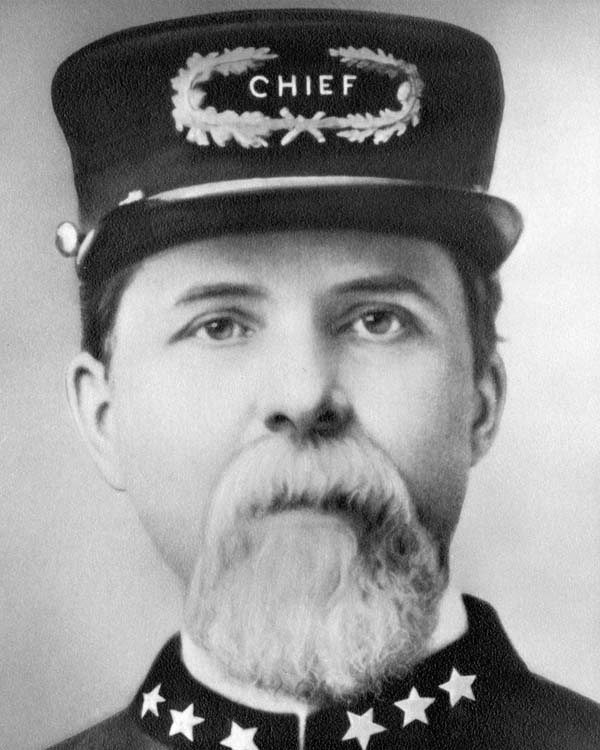
Michael Brennan (chief of the Chicago Police Department) testified during the prosecution's rebuttal

In their rebuttal, the prosecution again had many laypersons that were acquainted with Prendergast before the killing of Harrison testify to assert their view that Prendergast was sane and culpable of murder. They also had police (including Michael Brennan, the chief of the Chicago Police Department), jailers, and court officials (including Judge Horton) testify to Prendergast's sanity on the night of the killing and afterwards. Several laypersons were also called as fact witnesses, including Corporation Counsel Counsel Adolph Kraus (recalled to the stand).

=== Expert witness testimony during prosecution's rebuttal ===
In addition to lay witnesses, the prosecution they also had numerous expert witnesses testify to their professional belief that Prendergast was sane.

John C. Spray (who had for ten years served as the superintendent of Dunning Asylum) testified that he had observed Prendergast's behavior throughout the entire trial, and that he believed he was sane and responsible for his actions. Spray also testified about having had the opportunity to freely speak with Prendergast at the Cook County Jail during several visits, the first of which had been two or three days after the assassination. He testified that in their conversations, Prendergast had agreed with the notion that he was "in a pretty bad fix," and had expressed to Spray his belief in his ability to serve as corporation counsel despite lacking law credentials. Spray testified that Prendergast had expressed his belief after being appointed corporation counsel, he could make decisions about litigation in a general supervising manner and have assistants act as attorneys to carry out the specifics of litigation. Dr. Bluthardt (the former Cook County Physician) testified that, in his analysis of Prendergast's case, he could without hesitation judge Prendergast to be sane.

Dr. Henry M. Lyman similarly opined during the prosecution's questioning of him that he considered Prendergast to be sane. Prosecuting attorney Todd asked Lyman a long hypothetical about an individual mirroring Prendergast and his actions, and whether such an individual would be sane. During cross-examination, defense attorney Wade managed to have Lyman concede that every action described in Todd's hypothetical could also have been performed by an insane individual, and that an insane and irresponsible man acting under the influence of delusions could still carry a false appearance of sanity in many aspects.

Dr. John Benson (who had for two years been supervisor at the Dunning asylum) testified that his examination of Prendergast at the prison and observations of Prendergast in the courtroom left him to believe that Prendergast was sane. Benson testified that Prendergast had told him he killed Harrison because god had ordered him to do so, and that Prendergast also asserted the believe that it would be preferable for the corporation to be a well-educated individual without legal credentials than a lawyer who is not well-educated. Benson also testified that he had asked Prendergast if he would have committed the same act against Harrison again if he hypothetically could found himself in the same scenario, and that Prendergast had answered, "I didn't think that the people would take the affair the way they did. If I had to do it over again, it would be entirely different."

Dr. H. I. Baxter, who had previously visited Prendergast at the jail, opined that the actions he had observed of Prendergast in the courtroom led him to believe without doubt that (while Prendergast was feeble-minded and eccentric, vain, pompous, and morose) he was sane. Dr. James K. Egbert (a former assistant Cook County physician) testified that having watched Prendergast in the court, he considered him to his actions to be those of a sane individual. Dr. Nathan Davis (a medical jurisprudence teacher of 20 years) testified that, having examined Prendergast at the Cook County Jail, he considered Prendergast to be a sane man lacking any fixed hallucination or delusion. He asserted that there was no reason to doubt his self control, and that he was merely a man that had been motivated by his own self-exaltation and conceitedness. Davis also disagreed with the assertion by the defense that examination of the shape of a person's head and jaws could be used to determine whether or not that person is sane.

Dr. Leonard St. John testified that, based upon his visit to Prendergast at the Cook County Jail, he believed that Prendergast to be sane. He also testified that Prendergast had told him he had committed the murder because it was god's will for him to do so, but that he would not do it if given the chance to go back to that night because other people had not responded to the act the way that he had anticipated that they would.

Dr. Charles Gatchel testified that his examination of Prendergast at the Cook County Jail led him to consider Prendergast to be sane. He opined that a nervous and uneasy Prendergast had faked unintelligent behavior when they spoke, with Prendergast having declared to him, "I am interested in religion more than anything else. I am a martyr. I am a martyr." Dr. Silas Yount testified that he had spoken with Prendergast for two hours, and that Prendergast had been quiet and reasonable in their conversation. He further testified that Prendergast had stated his reason for killing Harrison was to ensure the elevation of the city's railroad tracks, and that Prendergast also had told him he had never consumed liquor. Yount opined that there was nothing wrong with Prendergast's head or jaw shape, and that he believed Prendergast to be sane.

== Defense's rebuttal ==
The first witness called for the defense's rebuttal was Robert J. Boylar, a reporter for the City Press Association. He testified that Prendergast's conduct in the courtroom had not changed after the testimony of experts, contrary to that assertion made in the earlier testimony of E. G. Westlake during the prosecution's rebuttal on December 20. Prendergast's brother John Prendergast testified to deny that Edward Normile, contrary to Normile's assertion in his December 21 testimony in the prosecution's rebuttal.

To help illustrate their contention that Prendergast was insane, the defense was permitted to introduce as evidence several letters that Prendergast had written. On December 23, they read notes and letters that Prendergast had addressed to attorney Walter Cooley and others. They read a letter written by Prendergast to his defense attorneys where he wrote,

I think it will be impossible to convince a jury that I am anything but sane. I did what I thought was good for society. If I were sent to an insane asylum my future would be utterly destroyed. If the death penalty should be imposed, I should lose nothing, for I would live hereafter. If I were sent to Joliet [Correctional Center] the chances are that I would be pardoned. I cannot die unless it be [god's] will; that I know.

The defense also read a letter in which Prendergast again asserted to them his declared preference of death to an insanity plea, protested the notion of being sent to the Chester Mental Health Center if found insane, and requested that many Catholic cardinals and similar figures be summoned to testify in his defense. In the letter he also claimed, "owing to a certain nervousness an unfamiliarity with firearms, the death of Mayor Harrison was made to appear much more sad than it should have been. Had I been able to take his life with one shot it would have been much less annoying to me."

The defense also read a December 4 letter by Prendergast to Henry George in which Prendergast had begged George to testify at the trial because, "it would be a bad blow for or glorious clause if anything should befall me." They also read a letter Prendergast had written to Reverend Michael Corrigan. Other letters used by the defense as evidence of Prendergast's insanity included a letter he had sent to U.S. Senator Fred Dubois which rambled about the debate over gold standard versus a silver standard and Prendergast's disapproval of President Grover Cleveland. Dr. Church was recalled for further testimony, initially testifying a belief that these letters demonstrated Prendergast's insanity. During cross examination, however, Trude pointed out that the letters had been initially written in pencil and traced over in ink, and managed to convince Church to concede that this illustrated the sanity-marking behaviors of deliberation and forethought.

The final witness of the defense's rebuttal was John Davin, whose testimony was to illustrate family a history of insanity exhibited by Prendergast's grandfather, William Prendergast. Davin testified that when he was a child in Ireland he had known William Prendergast. He testified that William Prendergast had become insane after losing his arm to gunfire in a military battle, resulting in the elder Prendergast's longtime confinement in a Ballyclogh insane asylum. Davin further testified that he had been scared during encounters with the elder Prendergast due to the level of insanity he had exhibited.

The defense attempted to compel Henry George to testify as a witness, even subpoenaing his testimony. However, George had managed to evade service of the subpoena and the defense rested its case without his testimony.

== Closing arguments ==
=== First portion of the defense's closing argument ===
Closing arguments were held on December 29. Speaking first was Wade, who delivered the first portion of the defense's closing argument.

=== Prosecution's closing argument ===
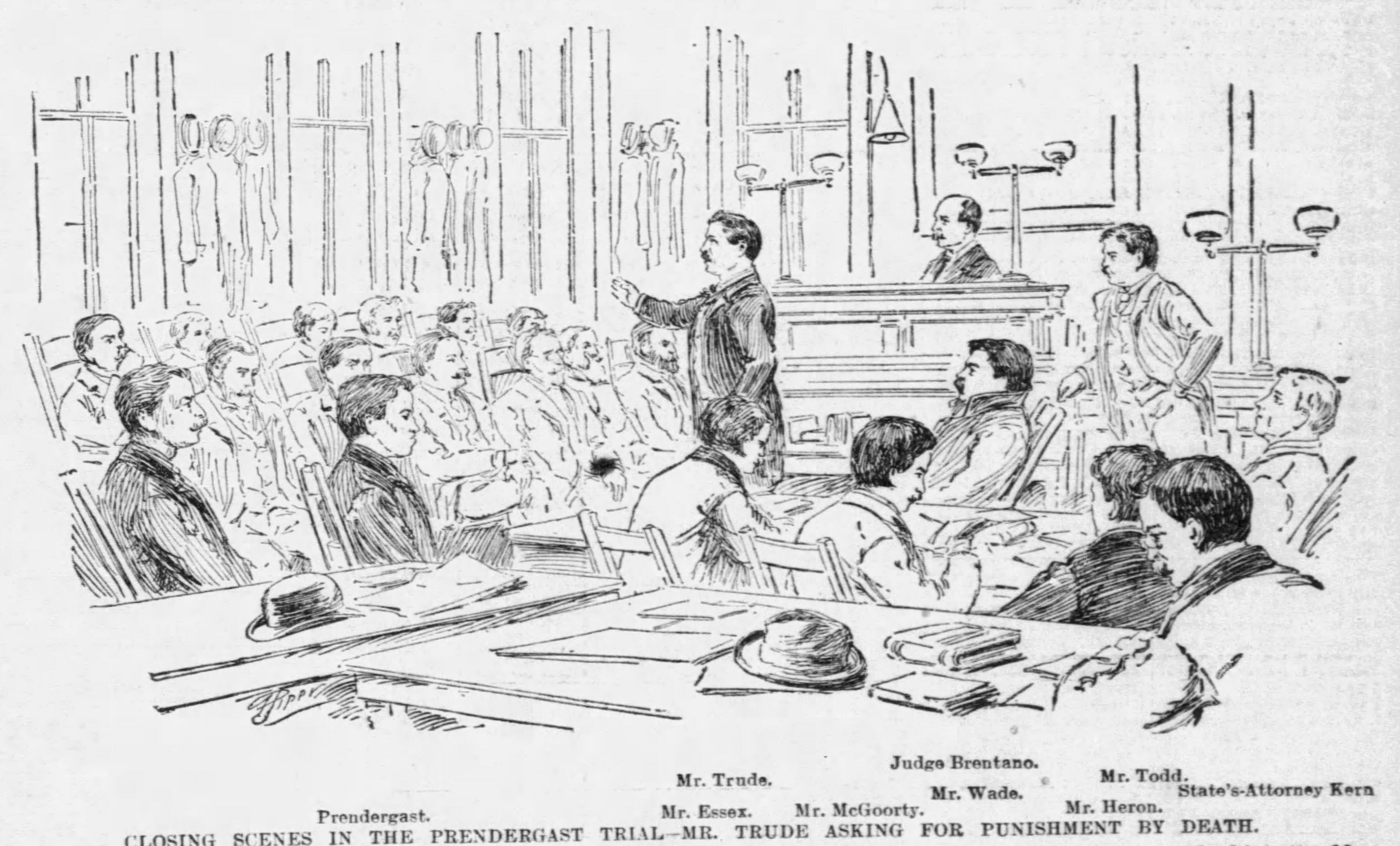
Illustration of prosecutor Trude requesting the death penalty

Following Wade's portion of the defense's closing argument, the prosecution delivered its closing argument. Todd spoke first. He prefaced his presentation by claiming to the jury that the prosecution had kept its promises made at the start of the trial about what they would prove to them. He also reminded the jurors that they had sworn that they would deliver the death penalty if it was justified by law and evidence. In his remarks, Todd sought to impeach the testimony that had been given by witnesses for the defense, and to discredit other evidence that the defense had presented. Todd characterized the testimonies given by Prendergast's mother and brother as each inconsistent with the other's testimony, exclaiming that, "either the mother or the son has lied."

The prosecution's closing argument finished with remarks by Trude which were described as, "eloquent...at times border[ing] on sensational."

Trude urged the jury to find Prendergast guilty and to sentence him to execution. Trude remarked,

The Harrisons would be the last to as [for] the execution of an insane man. The question is: are we to live under the stars and stripes or the red flag of anarchy.

Prendergast interrupted with an outburst, declaring,

I was not animated by malice. I swear by high heaven that I was not. You are my murderer if I die!

In the closing argument, Trude characterized Henry George (with whose work Prendergast had been fixated) as a "migratory and pestilential maniac."

Trude argued that Prendergast had been proven sane by a preponderance of evidence.

=== Second portion of the defense's closing argument ===
After Trude finished the prosecution's closing argument, the final portion of the defense's closing argument was delivered by Heron and McGoorty.

==== Heron's remarks in closing argument ====
Heron opened the second portion of the defense's closing argument. A reporter for the Chicago Inter Ocean wrote of the Heron's presentation,

Mr. Heron, on behalf of the defense, made one of the most remarkable addresses ever listened to in a murder trial. It was his debut as a criminal court orator. With apology to the jury for not being a 'Clay, a Webster, or even a Trude', he proceeded to pay off a few little grievances which have been accumulating during the trial by alluding to Mr. Todd as 'his overgrown pomposity' and other terms more or less sarcastic. From time to time, Judge Brentano joined in the proceedings to remind Mr. Heron that he was not conforming to the rules of practice, and occasionally Mr. Trude ventured a kindly-hearted objection to some flagrant trespass upon the rules of practice. Although handicapped by these interruptions, the speaker kept up his speech to the jury for an hour.

==== McGoorty's remarks in closing argument ====
McGoorty was last to speak for the defense in closing argument. His remarks did not focus much on the evidence had been introduced in the case, with the Inter Ocean's reporter noting, "his mission was to talk of the law in the case." McGoorty spoke for an hour before the court took a midday adjournment. When court reassembled, he continued his remarks for an additional hour-and-a-quarter.

The initial portion of McGoorty's remarks was focused on the law applicable to the case, the history of related law, and parallel legal practices in countries from which immigrant members of the jury had originated. The Inter Ocean reporter observed,

With a knowledge of the subject which indicated close study, he outlined the evolution of the laws on insanity from the days when men and women were hanged for witchcraft until the establishment of the present legal protection for the mentally irresponsible. It was a movement full of tact on the part of the speaker to trace the law on the subject as applied in various foreign countries. He did not refer to any country that did not have a native on the jury, and the reference to what was the law on the case in the countries from which the jurors came held their close attention, and increased their interest in the subject.

The same reporter also observed,

Throughout his address he was given the closest attention, and the effort that he made was one he might well be proud of. After listening to the first part of his speech, Mr. Trude congratulated the young man and later on took occasion to predict a brilliant future for his opponent.

McGoorty sought to make it clear to the jury that an acquittal of Prendergast for murder would not give Prendergast his freedom, insisting that it was likely that an acquitted Prendergast would be thereafter sent to an insane asylum and be effectively confined to such a facility for the remainder of his life.

In his presentation, McGoorty assailed the testimony of Judge Horton. He also assailed qualifications of various medical witnesses that had testified on behalf of the prosecution. In questioning the qualifications of Dr. N. S. Davis (a medical witnesses who had been called to testify to his professional opinion on the matters of brain diseases), he noted that, by Davis's own testimony, he had not specialized in ailments of the brain. McGoorty argued that, while Davis had earned respect in his own field of medicine, he was not qualified to speak from a position of expertise on the matters about which he testified. McGoorty additionally implied that the other doctors that had testified on behalf of the state had been of incredibly low medical talent.

== Jury instructions ==
After the closing arguments concluded, Judge Brentano delivered the jury instructions. Brentano instructions to the jury before they deliberated the verdict outlined that if they found, from all the evidence of the case, belief beyond a reasonable doubt that Prendergast had committed the accused crime "in manner and form as charged in the indictment, and that at the time of the commission of such crime the defendant knew that it was wrong to commit such a crime, and was mentally capable of choosing either to do or not to do the act or acts constituting such crime and of governing his conduct in accordance with such choice", then they would have a duty under the law to find him guilty. (Note: On this aspect, Brentano's instructions were, If, from all the evidence in the case, you believe beyond a reasonable doubt that the defendant [Prendergast] committed the crime of which he is accused, in manner and form as charged in the indictment, and that at the time of the commission of such crime the defendant knew that it was wrong to commit such a crime, and was mentally capable of choosing either to do or not to do the act or acts constituting such crime and of governing his conduct in accordance with such choice, then it is your duty under the law to find him guilty, even though you should believe from the evidence that at the time of the commission of the crime he was not entirely and perfectly sane. The court instructs the jury that if they believe from the evidence in the case that, at the time of doing the act charged, the prisoner was not of sound mind but was affected with insanity, and that such affection was the efficient cause of the act, and that he would not have done the act but for that affection, then he ought to be acquitted. But the court further instructs the jury that this unsoundness of mind or affection of insanity must be of such a degree that as to create an uncontrollable impulse to do the act charged by overriding the reason and judgement and obliterating the sense of right and wrong as to the particular act done and depriving the accused of the power of choosing between them.)

Brentano instructed the jury that insanity existed as a legitimate defense. That, if the jury had reasonable belief that Prendergast may have been insane in the manner aforementioned, then he must be acquitted. (Note: Brentano instructed, It is not sufficient to warrant conviction of Mr. Prendergast with the weight and preponderance of the evidence in favor of his sanity. Nor is it sufficient upon the doctrime of chance it is more probable that he was sane than insane. You must go further than that, and although the preponderance of testimony may incline you to the belief that he was sane at the time he fired the fatal shots, and even if there is more testimony to show his sanity than his insanity, still if you have any reasonable doubt as to whether he was sane, the law gives him the benefit of the doubt, and your verdict must be accordingly. If the jury believes from the evidence that the defendant [Prendergast] was laboring under a delusion that it was his duty to mankind to commit the deed for the benefit of mankind and to prevent the slaughter of individuals on account of the railroad track not being raised, and that he, the defendant, believed in his delusion at the time of the killing, [you the jury] must acquit him, provided you further believe from the evidence that at the time of the shooting of Carter Harrison the defended was under the impulse of such delusion to such an extend that it was uncontrollable by overriding the reason and judgement and obliterating the sense of right and wrong as to the act done and depriving the accused of the power of choosing between them.) Brentano made clear that the jury did not need to find Prendergast to have been of perfect sanity at the time of the crime in order to convict. Insanity would provide a successful defense if the jury believed that at the time of the murder he had been insane, and that insanity was the efficient cause of his committing the act (the murder). Insanity would also provide a successful defense if the jury believed Prendergast to have committed the crime while acting under a delusion which deprived him of the power of determining the moral difference between right and wrong. However, if the jury merely found him to have been mentally unsound but believed he committed the crime while fully aware that it was wrong, they should instead return a verdict of guilt.

The judge took twenty-five minutes to describing how the jury should consider the charge before excusing the jury to deliberate. During the duration jury instructions, Prendergast was reported to have hid his face under a black handkerchief. He was also reported to have physically reacted to the mention of the word "death" in jury instructions about potential sentencing. by momentarily lowering his hands. He is also reported to have begun nervously twitching after the instructions mentioned the possibility of his being sentenced to a mental penitentiary as an alternative to being sentenced to death.

== Verdict and sentencing ==
=== Jury deliberation ===
The jury deliberated for under an hour. It was reported in some news outlets that a court official had shared that a written record of the first ballot taken during the jury's deliberation had shown that the initial minds of the jury had eleven jurors siding with conviction and one having initially sided with an insanity verdict. However, one juror's account to the Chicago Tribune was that only a single ballot was required to reach a unanimous decision.

Shortly after the verdict was delivered, juror C. F. Reid commented to reporters,

As to our balloting on the verdict, I can't talk. The fact that we were so short a time ought to be enough to show that there was not any wide difference of opinion. the evidence was such that the only thing we could do was to convict the man, and fix his punishment at death. I feel that we have done our duty, and am much relieved that it is all over.

The Chicago Tribune quoted a juror as remarking that Prendergast's interruptions of Trude's argument had helped seal the conviction, recalling that, "Prendergast's actions in the court-room were greatly against him." He remarked that Prendergast's interruptions of Trude convinced jurors that Prendergast remembered facts of the assassination in a manner, "inconsistent with his being the victim of a delusion," and that his interruptions also persuaded jurors that, "his reasoning faculties were acute, his memory good, and that he regarded himself as being in danger." The same juror remarked that medical testimony was discussed, and that,

It was generally conceded that Mr. Trude's cross-examination of the experts for the defense rendered their testimony of little value. We regarded the statements made in jail to Dr. St. John and his companions of great importance. These were statements to the effect that [Prendergast] used scriptures [to justify his actions in murdering Harrison]
...The fact that [Prendergast] claimed to be so full of religion in his preaching and had so little of it in his practure was weighed by us.
Dr. St. John's clear method of explaining paranoia and chronic delusion, coupled with the testimony of Dr. Davis contributed largely to the finding of the verdict rendered.

The same juror recalled that J. M. Blanchard was the only juror that demonstrated hesitation in rendering a guilty verdict, recalling Blanchard as having been, "emotional and tender-hearted."

=== Delivery of the verdict and sentence ===
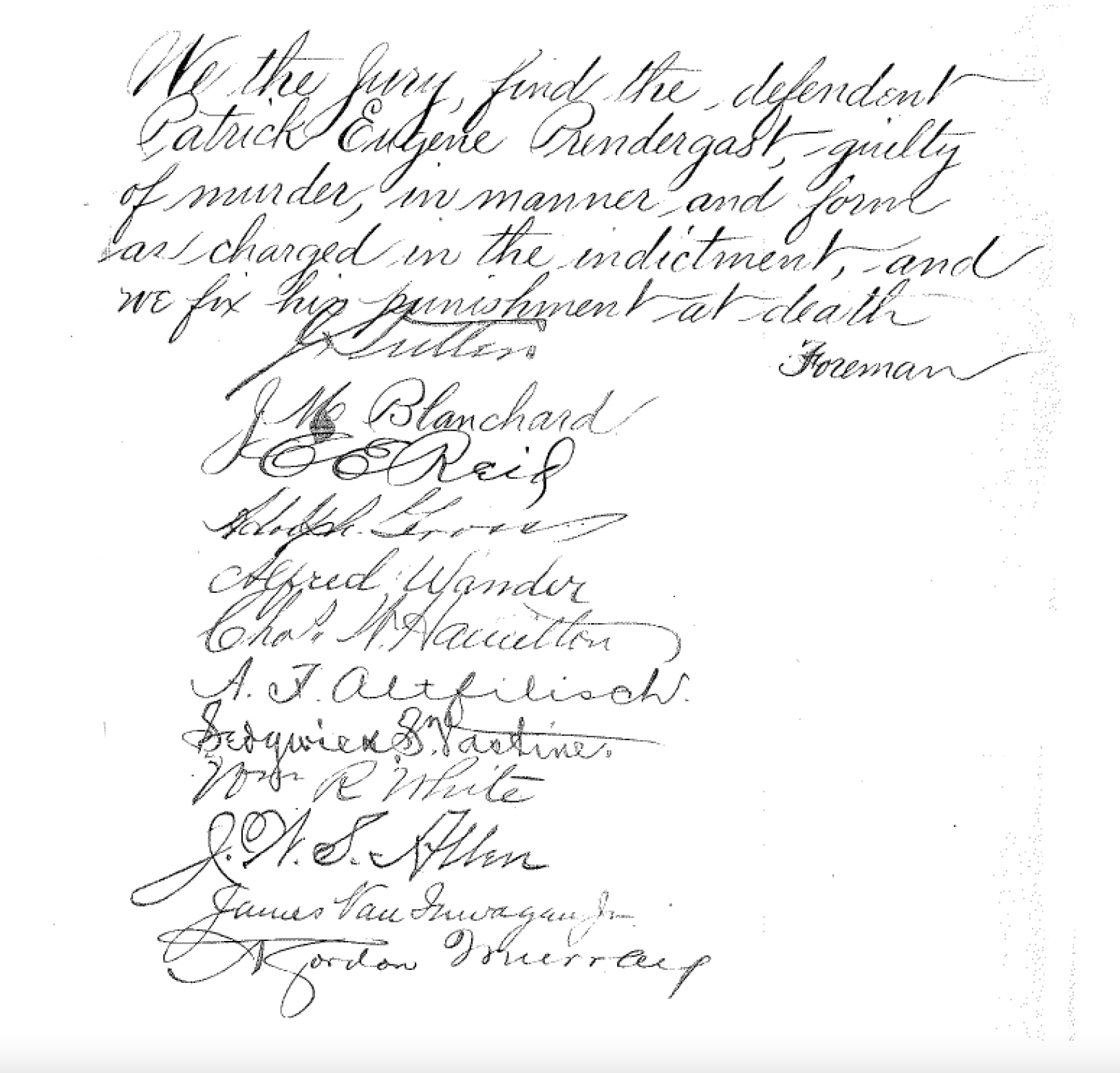
Written jury verdict

After less than an hour of deliberation on December 29, the jury delivered a guilty verdict. Its verdict found Prendergast sufficiently sane to be responsible for the act, and recommended the death penalty, all but ensuring that Prendergast would be sentenced death by hanging. The verdict was read to the court by Court Clerk Fitzgerald.

Prendergast was reported to have reacted with emotion to the verdict, with one newspaper describing him as "break[ing] down like the veriest coward and poltroon," further describing that he, "revealed himself an utter coward. His face turned pale, he opened his mouth to speak, but only a faint murmur came. He moved slightly and would have fallen but for the assistance of the bailiff."

Soon after the verdict was delivered, Prendergast was quickly escorted out of the courtroom. However, after defense attorney Wade made the unusual move of requesting for the jury to be polled, Judge Brentano ordered for Prendergast to be brought back into the courtroom. After Prendergast was returned the seat, each jury member was polled and affirmed that the verdict that had been announced was one that they had agreed to. Prendergast was reported to have listened to each juror's affirming of the verdict "with avidity". Prendergast was thereafter again removed from the courtroom, the jury was excused from duty, and the proceedings were called for an end. As would be the typical move, Wade motioned for a new trial. Brentano scheduled for there to be a subsequent hearing on the motion at a later date.

Prendergast was placed in cell 11 at the Cook County Jail after the court adjourned (with plans being for him to be transferred to a cell in death row the following day). After returning to his cell, he laid face down on his bunk and refused to speak to others. He opted against giving statements to media that night, after receiving inquiries.

== Unsuccessful motions for a new trial and arrest of judgement ==
After the verdict was rendered, Prendergast's defense attorneys immediately motioned for a new trial, citing errors, "in admitting incompetent and improper evidence," as well as claiming that testimony that was allowed during the arraignment about Prendergast's conduct had amounted to compelling Prendergast to "give evidence against himself," in violation of the Fifth Amendment to the Constitution of the United States.

Among its arguments requesting a new trial, Pendergast's alleged that one of the jurors had been an intimate acquaintance of the deceased mayor, and had materially mischaracterized this relationship during voir dire. During jury selection, Murray had disclosed that he had been acquainted with the mayor prior to his death, but characterized their acquaintanceship as very minor. Heron presented the court with an affidavit from Dr. James M. Boydon in which Byodon recalled that Murray had introduced him and the mayor at an event on July 15, 1891, and that Murray and Harrison had appeared to be friendly. He further recalled seeing Murray and Harrison engaged in friendly conversation at the Chicago Times offices in August 1892. These claims were corroborated by further affidavits of J. Harvey Bates and Robert Mathieson. A separate affidavit alleging an intimate acquaintanceship between Murray and Harrison was made by Hay Clark.

After considering the motion for a new trial, on February 24 Brentano denied it and sentenced Prendergast to executed on March 23, 1894. Brentano similarly overruled a motion for arrest of judgement.

=== Final sentencing ===
After the motions failed, Judge Brentano asked Prendergast to stand and asked, "have you anything you anything to say, Mr. Prendergast?" Prendergast proceeded to complain that he had not been given control over his own plea and defense (Note: Prendergast complained, This plea of insanity, may it please the court, was set up without my consent. Infamous plea of insanity [was enterred against my wishes by] disreputable careless lawyers....The question is, if the court please [sic], did I do right or did I do wrong at that particular time? Did I do my duty or not? Did I do the will ofGod or not? If I did wrong of course I ought to be condemned, if I did right I should be justified.) After this, Brentano entered the final sentence. (Note: In entering the final sentence, Brentano declared, The solemn and painful duty now devolves upon me to impose the sentence and judgment of the law, which is that you, Patrick Eugene Prendergast, between the hours of 10 0'clock in the forenoon and 2 0'clock in the afternoon of March 23, A.D. 1894, in the manner provided by the statute of this state, be hanged by the neck until you are dead.)

=== Reactions of relatives of Harrison ===
The St. Paul Globe reported of children of Harrison present in the courtroom at the time of the verdict, "the members of the late mayor's family were apparently expecting such a verdict as was given, and seemed to derive but little satisfaction from the fact that the murderer of their father was to die for his crime. After the court adjourned, Harrison's son William Preston was quick to venture over to lead prosecutor Trude and thank him.

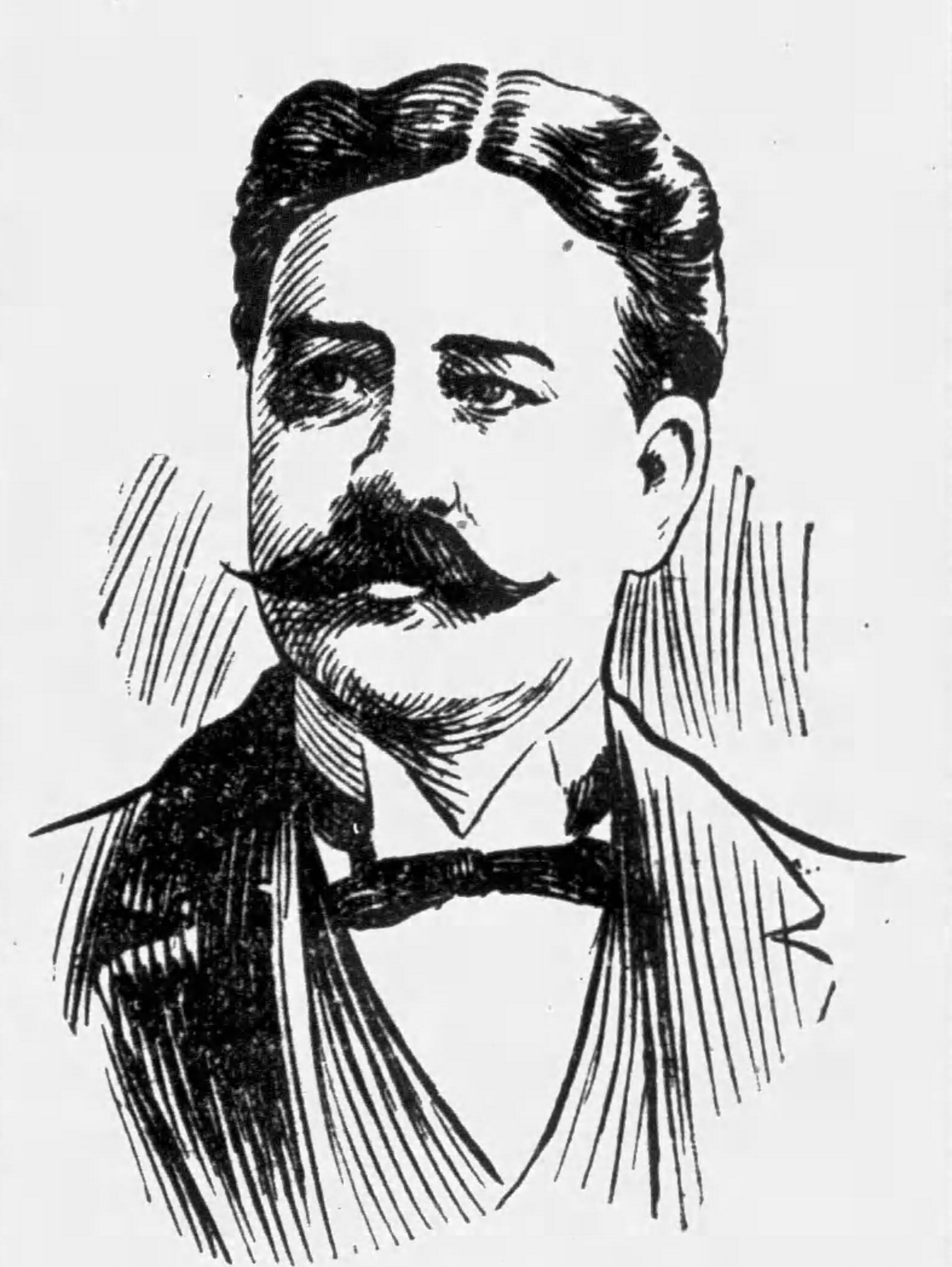
Carter Harrison IV (depicted in an illustration, circa 1901), a son of the deceased, expressed the belief that Prendergast's death sentence would act as a deterrent to, "the vast army of criminals who seek notoriety by deeds of violence or by threatening men occupying high positions"

Carter Harrison IV, a son of the deceased, remarked that the verdict did not surprise him, and that he had full confidence that the guilty verdict and the punishment were the most correct outcomes. He expressed receiving "little satisfaction" from the verdict, but also a belief that it was to the benefit of the society that it was rendered. He believed that Pendergast's handing would act a deterrent to, "the vast army of criminals who seek notoriety by deeds of violence or by threatening men occupying high positions". (Note: Carter Harrison IV's remarked were, I was not surprised when I heard the verdict, because to my mind there was never the least doubt as to the man's legal responsibility when he committed the act. I watched Prendergast's actions throughout most of the trial, and was impressed by his alertness at all times to detect any evidence for or against him. His denial as to certain testimony relating to his actions when he did the actual shooting proved conclusively to my mind that he was not laboring under any delusions while firing the shots, as otherwise he would not have been able to recall what he did or saw that evening. I also think that the hanging verdict will have the most beneficial effect upon the vast army of criminals who seek notoriety by deeds of violence or by threatening men occupying high positions. Prendergast is a dangerous man, and would be a menace to the community were he to again get free, as he himself boastingly remarked when defying Mr. Trude that he would go do the deed over again if he had the opportunity. Personally, I derive but little satisfaction from the verdict, but I think it is the best thing that could have happened for the community.)

Annie Howard, the late Harrison's bereaved fiancé, was ill and unable to speak to reporters on the day that the verdict was rendered. Her brother, Frank T. Howard, spoke to a reporter that visited his New Orleans residence. He agreed with the verdict, and expressed a sentiment that it had taken an excessive amount of time to hold the trial and deliver the verdict. He expressed an opinion that Prednergast could be adjudged insane, but that he was guilty and should not be spared any more than any other person would for the act of killing Harrison. (Note: Frank T. Howard's remarks were, I am rather surprised, considering Chicago's usual hustling style, that they were so slow in determining the fate of that assassin. When I left Chicago, it was said that Prendergast would be hanged before Christmas. It was two months yesterday since the horrible crime was committed. I have found the lawyers of New Orleans were of the almost unanimous opinion that the assassin would be acquitted. This opinion was based upon the theory that he was insane. They must have imagined that this sentimental plea, so effectual here, can be similarly utilized in Chicago. I fail to see why a man guilty of such a horrible crime , even though he could be adjudged insane, should be spared more than anyone else. But this man Prendergast was not insane. After committing the crime he made all possible haste to deliver himself up, in mortal terrror lest the vegance of the aroused and incensed people should be visited upon him. Dr. Lyman subsequently remarked to me that this, in itself, was sufficient to prove insanity.)

=== Reaction of Prendergast ===
News reports indicated that Prendergast's initial courtroom reaction to the verdict was emotional, with multiple newspapers characterizing him as having revealed his true cowardice upon hearing the verdict.

In the evening following the delivery verdict, Prendergast declined to give comment, asking not to be bothered after receiving a written correspondence informing him that the Associated Press would be interested in reporting any comment he would care to offer. This was to be his final evening in cell 11, his home for the previous months, as he was set to be moved to a new cell in the jail's death row the following day. As a precaution, that evening the prison placed Prendergast on suicide watch. His brother visited his cell, and his lawyers called him to offer encouragement as well.

On December 30, the morning after the verdict, Prendergast expressed strong confident that he would be granted a retrial, which would end in an acquittal.

=== Reactions of relatives of Prendergast ===
Shortly after the verdict Prendergast's brother, John Prendergast, remarked of the verdict,

I expected it. But this is not the end. My brother was not responsible for his act. Anyone who has heard the evidence would have to admit that he was proven insane if they were at all fair. I have no doubt that the case will have another chance in court.

Beyond this, he refused to offer any further comment to reporters the day the result was delivered. The following day, he told reporters that he believed that the defense counsel had made a critical error by declining a plea offer from the state that would have resulted in a sentence of life imprisonment for Prendergast.

Prendergast’s mother had not attended the trial during the session in which the verdict was delivered. However, reports vary as to whether she was present at the courthouse and learned of it there, or whether she awaited the verdict at home and received belated word there. Reporting to the prior claim recounts her being present at the courthouse, but wandering in the corridors outside of the courtroom instead of being present inside. Such reports claim that when news of the verdict spread outside of the courtroom, she was spotted "totter[ing] away, clanging to the bannister for support as she descended the stars, and struggled through the excited crowd thronging the approach to the court room." Other reports were that she had been busying herself at her house with chores (perhaps to distract herself from the pending verdict), and that she did not learn of the verdict until 4:30 pm local time (roughly two hours after it was delivered) when a Chicago Tribune reporter came to her residence to seek a quote and informed her and her brother-in-law of the verdict. The Chicago Tribune reporter quoted her brother-in-law as responding to the verdict by remarking, "that is perfectly right," in what was described as a, "satisfied air, while Mrs. Prendergast bore physical expression of emotional devastation about the verdict. Her brother-in-law was also asked by the reporter if there were funds to continue Prendergast's defense further, and differing from John Prendergast in his answer he replied, "no, there is not a cent."

=== Reactions of the prosecuting attorneys ===
==== Reaction of A. S. Trude (lead prosecutor) ====
After the verdict was delivered, lead prosecutor A. S. Trude told reporters that be believed the verdict to be, "a just one, in keeping with the law and evidence."

Trude also told reporters that while he felt "sorry" for Prendergast's mother, he believed that Prendergast's hanging would importantly serve a deterrent to other cranks. (Note: Trude remarked, The conviction of this man will, in my opinion, operate as a deterrent against the commission of like crimes by notoriety-loving cranks. To illustrate, when [Edward] Oxford fired the shot at Queen Victoria and was acquitted on the ground of insanity, an army of imitators appeared, and England reveled in a saturnalis of blood which continued until two of these cranks were hung, one in Exeter and the other in London. This sent a cold chill of horror down the spine of these characters, and there were heard no more. When Guiteau was hung, cranks disappeared from Washington and notirety hunters ceased to attain public notice with a postal as an adjunet to the accomplishment of that end. By cranks, I mean men who are not perfect in their moral and mental makeup, but who are able to distinguish between right and wrong, with the power of choosing to do or not to do a wrongful act. Since the trial of Prendergast has been in progress, Cranks have arisen all over the country, threatening mayors of cities, chiefs of departments, and men of means. This verdict will operate as a life insurance policy on their safety. A verdict of acquittal on the ground of insanity would have been the sowing of the dragon's teeth, and these [threatened mayors and officials] would be in danger of losing their lives.....the verdict will act as a deterrent with cranks and notoriety hunters and will result in much good. If Prendergast had been acquitted, there is no doubt that the country would have been filled with imitators. But with the shadow of the gallows over them, they would never execute there plans. The certainty of punishment alone will give protection to human life, not only from men who are what are termed "cranks", but from thieves, highwaymen, and burglars. I have no doubt Prendergast would never have killed Mayor Harrison if he had believed he would be hanged for it.)

Trude further remarked,

Prendergast was ably defended by four lawyers, two of whom were men of marked ability. The other two were splendid managers, and gathered together an immense mass of testimony on the question of insanity. My opinion is that the man is sane, at least to such an extend as to distinguish between right and wrong.
One thing which largely contributed to the verdict was the great display of memory and readiness of speech that occurred when I referred to the circumstances of the killing of Mayor Harrison...This disclosed a memory of events that occurred at the homicide inconsistent with insanity.

==== Reactions of the other prosecutors ====
Cook County State Attorney Kern commented to reporters after the verdict was delivered, "I believe the verdict fair and just and rendered from the evidence and the law. It is justice to Prendergast and to the community." Kern expressed his belief that the verdict sent an important warning to so-called "cranks", remarking,

There are a number of "cranks" at large and a few severe lessons will serve to stop this kind of work. When one of these "cranks" makes a sensation, others start, and for a time there is a perfect of crime on the insane order.

=== Reactions of the defense attorneys ===
==== Wade's reaction ====
After the court adjourned, Wade spoke to reporters. Wade was described by the Chicago Tribune as being "so indignant over the verdict that he hardly had words to express his feelings. He had looked for a life imprisonment verdict at the most, and was not prepared for the death penalty. Wade remarked, "I will bank my life that this boy will never hang. We have made a motion for a new trial that will be heard in a few weeks. Should that fail, we shall carry the case to the Supreme Court. Wade stated that in their forthcoming motion for a new trial, the defense intended to allege that A. Gordon Murray (a juror) had given false testimony in juror selection when he denied having been close friends of the late Harrison. They would also object to aspects of Brentano's jury instructions. They would also argue that Doctors Church, Moyer, Dewey, and Brower (who the state had originally tasked with assessing Prendergast) as well as nine physicians brought by the state and three physicians brought by the defense had in fact given testimony that in effect pronounced Prendergast insane.

In his denouncement of the verdict, Wade criticized the jury as biased and questioned their motives, commenting,

Judge Brentano attempted to give as fair a trial as any one could have done. With the jury it was different. They were all sycophants. The verdict makes a farce of our jury system and is as unjust as can be. The evidence showed the boy to be insane beyond a doubt, and you may mark my word that the strain imposed upon his mind will make him a raving maniac before a supersedeas could reach the Supreme Court. Prendergast’s actions in court may have hurt his case with the jury, but all reasonable men knew he was crazy. It was another question of the rich against the poor. The Harrison family paid the bills of the prosecution...I would not have cared so much had the sentence been imprisonment. Two years would have found the boy in some insane asylum. Yes, sir, the verdict is an outrage and will not stand.

Shortly after the verdict, Wade told reporters that he had received telegrams from lawyers across the country encouraging him to continue to represent Prendergast and appeal his verdict. He expressed the view that $25,000 could potentially be raised from fellow lawyers alone to fund appeals.

==== Heron's reaction ====
Heron wrote to a legal magazine,

We should have secured from the jury a verdict of acquittal, or a life sentence at the farthest, from the evidence we presented to show the prisoner's insanity. Seemingly, all our evidence went for naught. Public sentiment, and the arguments of the great and only criminal lawyer, A. S. Trude, carried the jury by storm, and we poor lawyers, with all our evidence, were not 'in it' from the start of the trial.
Our arguments for a new trial will come up in the course of a few weeks, and we hope to have some success there. If we do not succeed, I can safely say that the verdict will never be affirmed by the [Supreme Court of Illinois].

==== McGoorty's reaction ====
McGoorty wrote,

We consider the non-expert introduced by the defense deficient to establish his sanity. The most eminent specialists on mental disease in the West declared on the witness stand that they believed him mentally irresponsible, and unable to choose between right and wrong at the time of the deed. The non-expert testimony introduced by the state was weak. The verdict rendered by the jury was a great surprise. We hoped for a disagreement or an acquittal.

=== Reaction of Judge Brentano ===
After the verdict, Brentano praised the jury as having been, "the most intelligent jury that I ever saw." However, he refused to provide comment on the trial itself, telling reporters, "I think it would be improper....the whole case may come up before me for review on a motion for a new trial, and therefore I cannot speak about it until I give judgement." Brentano did remark that the trial had been exceptionally taxing on him, remarking, "I am completely worn out, as I never was by any other murder trial."

=== Reactions of trial witnesses ===
After the verdict was delivered, Dr. D. R. Brower, who had testified for the defense that Prendergast was insane, told an Associated Press reporter,

I have no reason to change my mind since I testified. I think there never was a clearer case of insanity. The verdict is outrageous and the execution of Prendergast would be nothing short of judicial murder.

== Public reaction to the verdict ==
Public reactions were predominantly supportive of the trial's outcome. The popular view was that his execution would serve as an example to deter other "cranks" from carrying out similar acts of violence against government officials.

Incidentally, towards the end of the trial another so-called "crank" had attempted to use a revolver to assassinate a mayor of a large American city. (Note: in the 1890s, Louisville was among the twenty most- populous cities in the United States) On December 26, an aggrieved man named had walked into the office of Henry S. Tyler (mayor of Louisville, Kentucky) and attempted to assassinate him, only to be disarmed by Tyler.

=== Politicians ===
The verdict immediately attracted comment from politicians.

Vice President Adlai Stevenson I (who hailed from Illinois) remarked,

The verdict of guilty was universally expected. I am not unfamiliar with the expert testimony adduced regarding the defendant's sanity, but this crime was a cold-blooded one, and shocked the entire country. I speak rather warmly because Carter Harrison was my personal friend. The verdict seems to be just.

Former president Benjamin Harrison (a distant relative of Harrison's) was asked on the day the verdict was rendered by an Associated Press reporter if he had seen the verdict. The former president said that he had "glanced at it" but had not carefully read it, and that he did not "care to talk about the subject" because he had "not followed the trial closely" and was "not prepared to give an opinion." The former president further remarked, "It was a murder trial and my views are probably the same as many other persons."

U.S. Congressman J. Frank Aldrich of Illinois commented,

Ninety-nine out of every hundred expected that verdict. I am not in the least surprised at the finding of the jury. I have followed the case in the papers very closely, and I am convinced that there were no grounds for clemency. The defense certainly made no case of insanity, and my convictions would have to be very materially changed if I were to say anything against the verdict.

U.S. Congressman John C. Black of Illinois remarked,

I speak not as a lawyer, for I have not followed the testimony in the case, but as a citizen, having formed some impressions from what I have read and heard, I should say that the verdict is righteous, and that the twelve men who sat on the jury arrived at the correct conclusion.

U.S. Congressman Edward Lane of Illinois opined, "the verdict expressed my sentiments. I endorse it fully. There is not question as to Prendergast's guilt."

Some political figures that were asked for comment declined. Illinois Governor John Peter Altgeld declined to provide substantive comment, saying, "I know nothing about this case except what I have read in the newspapers, and, therefore, I cannot give any opinion in regard to the verdict." Walter Q. Gresham (the U.S. secretary of state) remarked that he had not been closely following reports of the trial, and therefore also declined to comment. Melville Fuller (chief justice of the Supreme Court of the United States) also declined to comment, as there was a chance the matter could come before the court on appeal and he wanted to avoid prejudging the matter.

=== Other notable figures ===
Prominent New York City railroad businessman and attorney Chauncey Depew remarked,

I would simply say this: the verdict is very gratifying to me, and should be so to every citizen as a vindication of the supremacy of the law. It is a verdict which does great credit to Chicago, and demonstrates, as did her action in the case of the [Haymarket affair] anarchists, her fearless and determined effort to make her municipality safe for life and property.

Prominent railroad financier Russell Sage showed some surprise when informed of the verdict, but remarked,

I think [Prendergast] deserves it, if ever anyone did. His pretensions of insanity were made up in order to gain the sympathy of those who might believe in him. I think the influence of the verdict will be a wholesome one. It will teach the masses to have no sympathy for cranks; that they are responsible to the law, which is the bulwark and protection of our lives and liberties, and its influences will be restraining to them and make them lead the lives of good and respectable citizens.

Dr. Selden H. Talcott, who had previously given expert medical testimony in Guiteau's trial for the assassination of President Garfield, said that he believed that Prendergast had mental defencts, but that also the laws should not be written in a manner that would exempt him from criminal penalty. He remarked, "I think Prendergast was a crank. His mind was unbalanced; but I think he should be held responsible for his crime. The laws should be so amended as to cover cases of this kind."

=== Newspapers ===
Across the United States, newspaper reports and editorials hailed the verdict, greeting it with a fascination and excitement that was typical of how they contemporarily covered death sentences. The San Francisco Call and Post characterized the broad view of the press as holding the conviction to be "a vindication of the law" which would have a beneficial societal impact by deterring would-be cranks. As the date set for his execution subsequently grew nearer, newspapers would continue to express positive anticipation of it.

The Chicago Times (owned in part by the Harrison family) opined,

Exact and speedy justice hads been done by the court and the jury....The rapidity with which this case has been carried to conclusion, without the slighting of any pescribed legal form, without denying to the accused an opportunity to demonstrate his insanity, is encouraging to friends of society. Defended by able counsel, with sufficient means to secure a wide range of "expert" testimony in his behalf, Prendergast had every chance for his life. His conviction dals a fatal blow to the plea of criminal lawyers, backed up by opinionated physicians, that eccentricity is a complete defense to a charge of murder. It is hoped now that the sentence of the court may be speedily executed. Demonstration has been made that wanton murder shall not go unpunished in Chicago. Let there be added to this, for the intimidation of homicidal cranks of the future, evidence that the course of Illinois will not connive at prolonging the worthless life of a red-handed murderer by entertaining dilatory motions or by being hampered by the puerilities of a certain sort of criminal lawyers.

The Chicago Inter Ocean opined,

No one who has followed the case could have expected any other result, and the public generally will approve the verdict. The only question was as to the murderer's sanity, and the defense utterly failed to make him out a lunatic. That he is a crank, in the ordinary acceptation of that term, his mind constitutionally defective, is, not doubt, true. But the true object of punishment is to protect society, and there is today no freater manace to human life than the so-called cranks.

The St. Paul Globe praised the verdict as "just and true", and opined that it had delivered a "just rebuke" to "crankism". The publication's editorial also asserted the belief that "Guiteau immatators will retire from business for a time" a result of the verdict. It further opined that the "people of Chicago approve [of the verdict]," further writing,,

Ably defended as the assassin has been, strong as has been the evidence adduced to save his neck from the halter, the jury has found him sane, responsible for his act, and demanded that he pay the price for his offense against the law .tHis price, however, is a sorry one at best. The value to the world of one life such as that of Carter H. Harrison would weigh down the scale against the existence of a hundred such as Prendergast.

The New York World opined in its editorial column,

Prendergast, the assassin of Mayor Carter Harrison, has been convicted of murder and sentenced to be hanged. This is eminently right. A "crank" who threatens and carefully executes a murder, if crazy at all, is just crazy enough to be hanged. There is no nonsense about murder trials in Chicago.

The New Yorker Staats-Zeitung commented,

There may be people who doubt justice of this degree, because Prendergast was probably not in his right mind, but the great majority of all right thinking people will be reconciled with this termination of the case.

The New Orleans Picayune wrote approvingly of the verdict, opining that the testimony in the trial had convinced them that Prendergast was sane enough to know what he was doing, making the murder deliberate and worthy of punishment. While the newspaper believed him to be a fanatic, they did not believe he was insane to the point that he could be relieved of responsibility.

The New Orleans Times-Democrat wrote,

The verdict of the case of Prendergast will meet with universal approval and the promptness shown in the trial is deserving of the highest praise. Chicago acted well in insisting on a prompt but fair and impartial trial and in condemning the murderer to death by the law and preventing it by the act of a mob. Prendergast's mind was undoubtedly ill-balanced, but the trial showed that he knew what he was doing and was therefore responsible for his act.

The North American (of Philadelphia) opined,

There is no room for two opinions as to the justice of the verdict and the sentence in the case of Prendergast. He deserves hanging, if ever a man did, and it is a great satisfaction that the jury which tried him has the clear sense and simple courage to do right. Now it is to be hoped that no undue delay will be permitted to intervene between the sentence and its execution.

The Philadelphia Inquirer opined,

The verdict....is perfectly just. There was not a scintilla of real evidence to show that he was anything but a cold-blooded murderer. When Prendergast is hanged, perhaps assassinations will [decrease in number].

The Philadelphia Press opined,

At this distance, a verdict of not guilty by reason of insanity would probably have fallen more in line with the general expectation than the verdict rendered. [However], if hanging the Guiteaus and Prendergasts tends to suppress these fellows, their execution is warranted on the ground of grave public policy.

The Los Angeles Times editorialized in praise of the verdict,

In view of the numerous glaring and outrageous miscarriages of justice which have characterized the actions of American jurors in dealing with criminals during the past few years, and the dangerous growth of misplaced and maudlin sympathy to men whose hands are red with blood, it is encouraging to learn that the jury in the Prendergast case has promptly found that murderer guilty with the sentence of death. Now, let the sentence of the law be carried out without any unreasonable delay, and let us have an end to this attempt to make martyrs and heroes of assassins. The theory of "emotional insanity" is an apology for and encouragement of crime.

=== Contemporary legal publications ===
In a journal article published in The American Law Register and Review, H. M. Bannister cast doubt on the psychiatrical knowledge of several of the prosecution's expert witnesses (including Dr. Bluthardt).

The Law Students Helper opined, "[Brentano's] rulings in the Prendergast trial show[ed] him to be a firm, intelligent, and impartial judge."

=== Contemporary medical publications ===
An editorial in the July 1894 edition of The Journal of the American Medical Association expressed agreement with the outcome of the trial. While called into question the expertise of many of the expert witnesses both the prosecution and defense had called to the stand, it also opined that the insanity plea had been, "set forth with great ability by the counsel for [Prendergast]". The editorial observed that public reception to both the initial trial and subsequent insanity hearing indicated the public's desire for "speedy justice by the application of the lex talionis [reciprocal retaliation]." The same editorial opined that regardless of Prendergast's sanity, the public would much prefer to rich the world of him and those similar to him. (Note: The editorial opined, There will be a sense of relief that there is a fair prospect of ridding the world of such a monstrosity as Prendergast, and whether these wretches are sane or insane, it can not be denied that the world will be better off when its Prendergasts and [Sante Geronimo Caserios] shall have taken leave of it. We can well spare assassins from our midst, and sympathy might much better be expressed with the State, and the families of the victims, than with the murderer. It is impossible to entirely lose sight of the magnitude of the crime committed in the examination of this question, and it is an evident truth that if the peace of society is to be maintained, laws respected, and the State preserved, we must not obtrude a defense of technical insanity to shield the perpetrator from the consequences of his crime.) The editorial also argued that,

Insanity, when valid as a defense, should be clear and distinct. There are worse perils for a country than the execution of a criminal whose brain may be technically aberrant, and while one view of the humanities would naturally prevent the execution of a maniac, there is no excuse for preserving the worthless lives of those assassins who are simply eccentric.

The question of Prendergast's sanity was the subject of the twenty-first chapter of Edward C. Mann's 1893 book A Treatise On the Medical Jurisprudence of Insanity, (Note: Mann had for more than a decade prior written in advocacy for reform to the United States' law related to insanity. His 1893 book received polarized reviews. The Journal of the American Medical Association hailed the book as a "handsome volume on [a] branch of the insanity question contain[ing] not only the views and opinions of one thoroughly expert in matters of which he treats, but [which also] gives such authoritative and definite statements concerning the subject as to make it of great value to all who wish to keep abreast of the modern decisions and views." Contrarily, The American Law Register and Review lambasted it as "absolutely worthless" to lawyers and a "regret[table]" resource for any physician, with their review describing it as "evidenc[ing] insufficient study of the subjects discussed," and, "full of inaccuracies and loose statements"; characterizing Mann as, "evidently having no conception of legal principles".) which was published shortly before the trial. The book also contained chapters similarly exploring the sanity of murderers Charles Guiteau, Edward Newton Rowell, and Lucille Yesult Dudley as case studies. While Mann's book offered a confident assessment that Guiteau had been insane, its chapter on Prendergast did not offer a clear conclusion about Prendergast's sanity, only cautioning that,

Society must punish crime, not for revenge, but to protect society from evil deeds, to put penal restraint on the criminal and to deter others by the example and him by the memory of his sufferings from a repetition of his acts. The punishment of an insane person or an idiot is no benefit to him, as he can not learn by it, while the example of its infliction, so far as serving a warning to others, is an outrage of social feeling and brings discredit on the administration of justice.

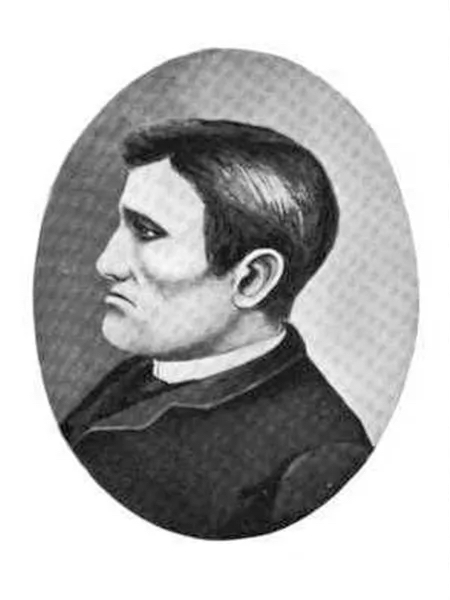
Illustration of Prendergast that was published in an 1895 study published in Transactions of the Medical Society of the State of New York, which gave substantial focus to aspects of his physical appearance in reaching a view that Prendergast had been insane

In 1895, a journal study of Prendergast was published in Transactions of the Medical Society of the State of New York. Contrary to the jury verdicts, the author concluded that Prendergast had been insane. The study gave significant focus to aspects Prendergast's physical appearance in reaching that conclusion.

In a July 1895 journal article published in Medical Record, physician J. R. Ransom opined that Prendergast had been convicted due to public sentiment and not a reasonable assessment of his sanity,

It seems convincing enough to the average mind that this man was insane, and yet, in spite of this, and the fact five medical experts out of six [that the state had had observe Prendergast believed] that he was insane, it proved to be insufficient to protect him from the injustice which public clamor visited upon him."

== Appeals efforts ==
=== Change in Prendergast's legal representation and the Illinois Supreme Court's refusal to intervene ===
By some time in May, (Note: while it is not clear the exact date when Darrow involved himself in the matter of Prendergast's defense, an article in The New York Times supports that Darrow had involved himself as early as February 1894 in the defense, reporting that Darrow had by February 20 become junior counsel for the defense, and on that date had spoken before the court as part of the defense's arguments to support their motion for a new trial) Wade had departed from Prengergast's defense and Clarence Darrow had become Prendergast's primary counsel. Darrow had months earlier left his position as the city's assistant corporation counsel. This was his first murder case, and marked the start of a storied criminal law career for him. Joining Darrow in his representation of Prendergast was James S. Harlan and Stephen S. Gregory. Trude continued as the case's prosecutor. Darrow was among Chicago's most boisterous opponents of capital punishment (the death sentence) but had never before represented a defendant in a murder case.

On March 21, an application was filed writ of habeas corpus was sent to Judge James Graham Jenkins (of the United States Court of Appeals for the Seventh Circuit) and Justice John Marshall Harlan (Note: Justice Harlan was the father of one of Prendergast's attorneys, James S. Harlan) (associate justice of the United States Supreme Court)

On March 22, the eve of the scheduled execution date, the Illinois Supreme Court delivered their refusal to a request that had been made immediately after the trial on Prendergast's behalf that they intervene.

=== Sanity proceeding ===
Also on March 22 (the eve of the scheduled execution date), Prendergast's brother filed a petition on Prendergast's behalf citing Illinois' section 285 of the (then-current) Illinois Criminal Code, which barred the trial or execution of individuals who become "lunatic or insane" after the commission of a crime for as long as the remain in such a mental state. If he were to be deemed insane, this would forbid Prendergast's death sentence from being carried out until such a point that he would be deemed sane. The statute required a sanity hearing to take place if it appeared that the condemned may have become insane since the verdict sentencing them to death had been delivered.

Late on the night of March 22, while sitting in the Cook County Criminal, Judge Arthur H. Chetlain ordered a two-week reprieve to Prendergast; issuing a de lunatico inquirendo writ which ordered an inquiry to be held so that a jury could judge whether or not Prendergast was currently insane. If he were currently insane, it would make him ineligible to be executed by the state until such a time that he were rendered sane. This move by Chetlain was highly unexpected, and he faced tremendous backlash for issuing this reprieve. He was accused of philandering and having exceeded his judicial authority. In response to backlash he received, Chetlain recused himself from presiding further over the matter, and the case was transferred to Judge John Barton Payne.

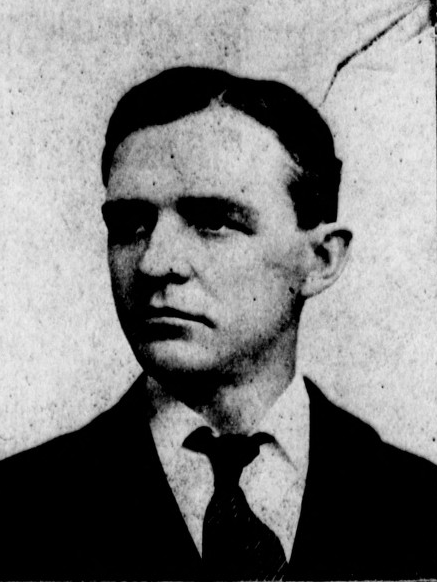
Judge John Barton Payne (pictured, in 1910) presided over the insanity inquiry proceeding

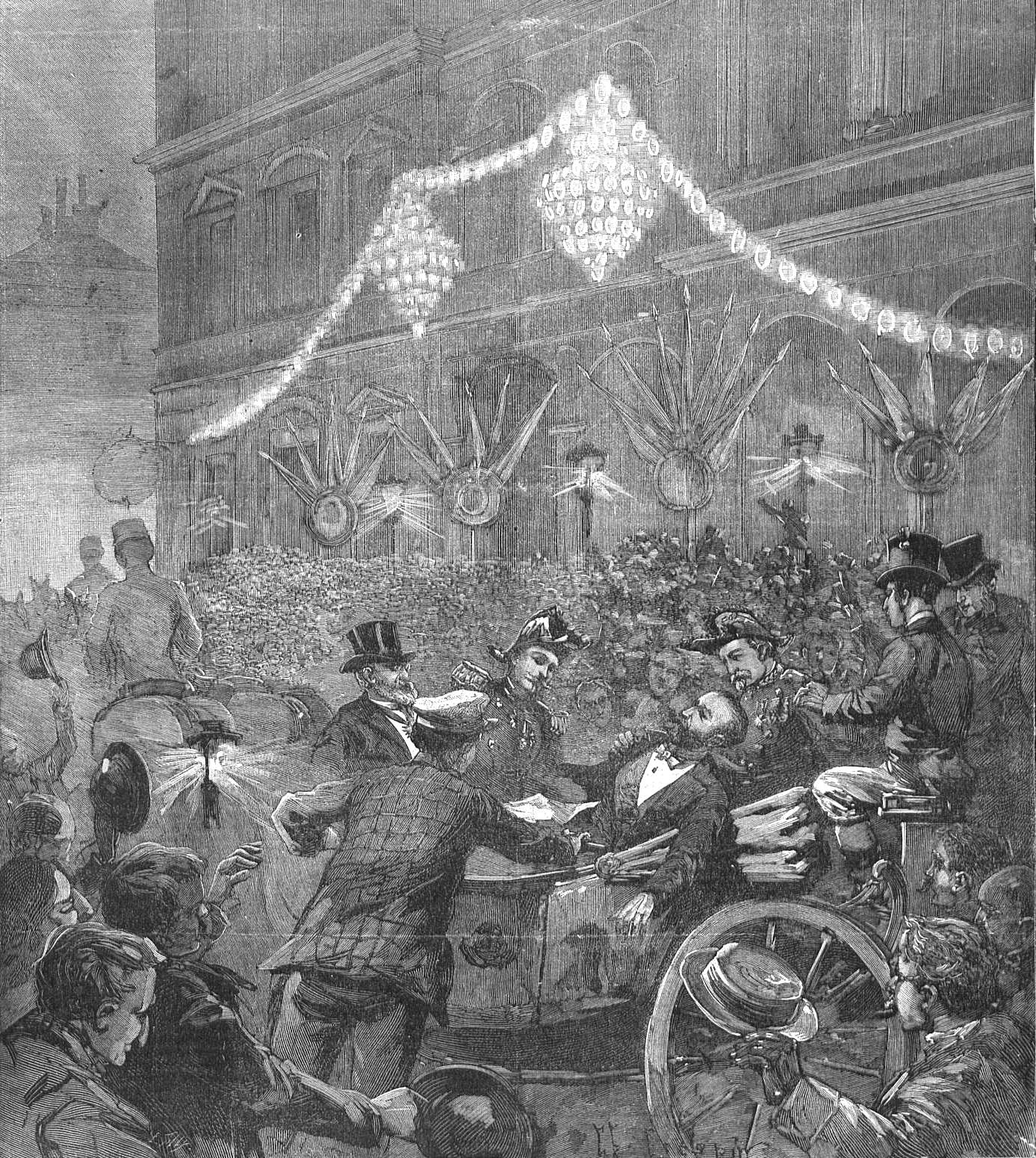
The assassination of French president Sadi Carnot (illustrated above) brought renewed interest in Prendergast's legal proceedings

Following many delays, the sanity proceeding began on June 20, 1894. Despite objections by the defense, Trude was allowed to continue representing the state against Prendergast. The proceedings received renewed public interest after French president Sadi Carnot was assassinated on June 24. Many had already been concerned after Harrison's assassination that it was part of a perceived trend of violent crimes being committed against officials, with other examples in the previous several years including the assassination of President Garfield and the assassination of Russian Tsar Alexander II.

Richard Allen Morton has written of the proceeding,

Unlike the first trial, where Trude had overwhelmed the defense, Darrow was not intimidated and fought and objected at every point, often to the judge's irritation. He was so vigorous in this regard that he might be trying to lay the groundwork for a possible appeal. Also adding to the rising emotion of the trial were frequent, apparently irrational, punctuations by Prendergast himself, which the newspapers dismissed once again as merely role-playing.

=== Late attempts to forestall Prendergast's execution ===
Darrow and Harlan attempted to persuade Governor Altgeld to issue a pardon. Darrow had previously been law partners with Altgeld, and the previous year had succeeded in persuading him to pardon some of those who had been convicted for the Haymarket Affair. However, Altgeld had suffering great damage to his public approval due to those pardons (especially among Chicagoans), and was not persuaded by Darrow and Harlan to bring harm his political standing further by pardoning Prendergast, particularly given that the violent disorder of the then-ongoing Pullman Strike had created an appetite among Chicagoans to see harsh punishment for crime.

A request was made July 12, 1894 to federal judge Peter S. Grosscup (of the United States District Court for the Northern District of Illinois) for a writ of habeas corpus and a request for a stay of execution. in order to permit an appeal to be made to the Supreme Court of the United States under a claim that Prendergast's rights under the Due Process Clause in the Fourteenth Amendment had been denied, pointing to Judge Horton having presented an opinion of his own concerning Prendergast's sanity during the trial and allowed certain evidence regarding the facts of the murder. The request also falsely claimed that Prendergast had not been permitted to speak on his own behalf. In the hearing before Grosscup, strong arguments were made by Prendergast's lawyer. With hours left before Prendergast’s scheduled execution, Grosscup refused to stop the execution in a detailed opinion. Grosscup opined that the Fourteenth Amendment was not applicable to "any particular trial but to the action of the Legislature and state polity."

== Execution ==
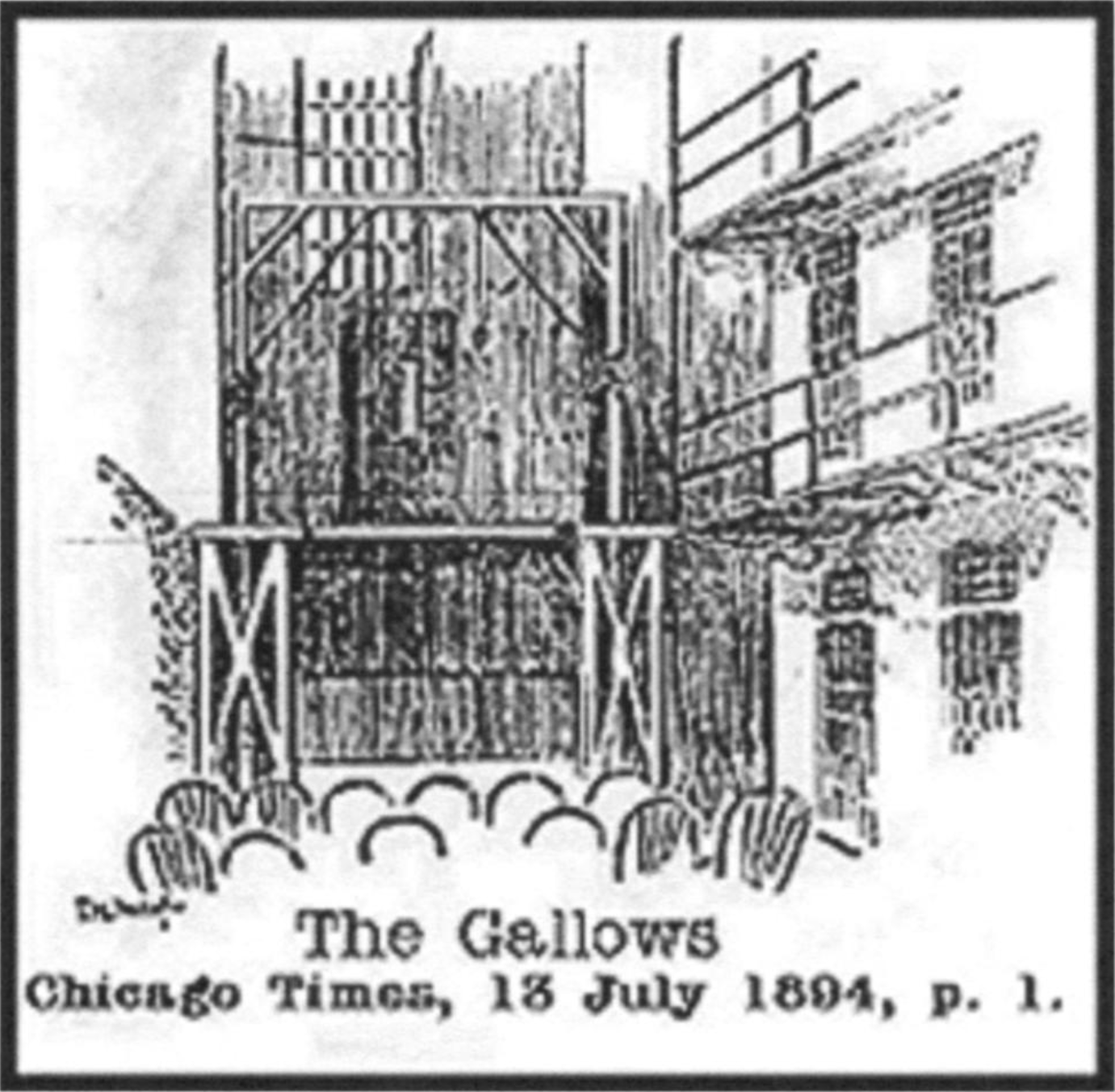
Illustration of the gallows in which Prendergast was hung

Prendergast was hanged on July 13, 1894 in a gallows that had been constructed in the north corridor of the county jail. About 500 ticketed witnesses assembled to watch the execution, which included the members of the jury who had convicted Prendergast.

When he got to the top of the platform, Prendergast briefly raised his hands, recognizing the crowd that gathered to view his execution. Prendergast walked to the edge of the trap without assistance, where his hands were fastened. Although having previously planned to make a last statement to the crowd, he had been dissuaded by Father Berry, to whom he quietly delivered his last words, "I had no malice against anyone." A signal was given and at 11:48 the rope holding the heavy trap in place was cut. Prendergast's neck was broken by the six-foot drop and his body did not move after the fall. His heart was measured to have stopped within twelve some minutes. Five minutes after that, his body was taken down and placed in an awaiting coffin for burial.

== Retrospective views on the question of Prendergast's sanity ==
More modern retrospective writings about the trial often contend that the defense indeed was correct in its assertions of Prendergast's insanity, and that the juries he faced were wrong to find him sane. Numerous authors have faulted political factors, such anti-"crank" sentiment and a desire to make an example out of Prendergast, as playing a key role in his conviction and execution.

Clarence Darrow (renown defense attorney who represented Prendergast in his unsuccessful efforts to appeal his sentence) reflected in his 1905 autobiography The Story of My Life,

Every one believes now, and most people believed then, that he was insane and idiotic; but he had killed a mayor, as another crazy man had killed President James A. Garfield, and was promptly hanged for the deed; but the execution of Guiteau, who was plainly insane, did not prevent another lunatic from killing President McKinley. In all these cases the people of course wanted the killer put to death, and the voice of the people is the voice of their God.

In October 1956, Tappan Gregory (a former president of the American Bar Association) delivered a lecture at the University of Chicago about the life of his father Stephen S. Gregory (who had represented Prendergast in his appeal efforts). He opined that jurors had been subject to influence by the crowds surrounding the courthouse,

[When] the jurors went out [of the courthouse] for exercise under escort, crowds swarmed about them and thirsting for the blood of [Prendergast], with threats and vituperation, exhort[ing] them to hang him.

A 2002 journal article by Edward M. Burke that was published in the Journal of Criminal Law & Criminology noted that the prosecution's expert witnesses ignored key aspects of Prendergast's biography that had been outlined by lay witnesses for the defense,

"Expert" witnesses testified that although [Prendergast] was a "crank," he was, in fact, sane when he pulled the trigger and murdered Harrison. They paid little attention to the report that he had suffered a severe head trauma as a child that left him impaired, or the fact that his grandfather had died in Ireland in a lunatic asylum.

== See also ==
- Funeral of Carter Harrison III
