= Henry L. Hertz =

American businessman and politician (1847–1926)

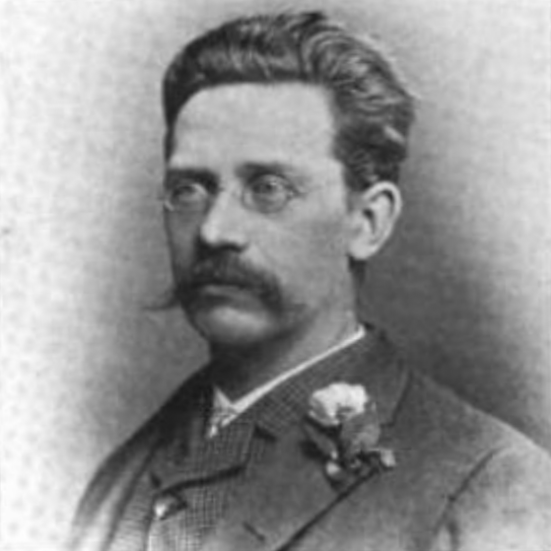

15th Collector of Internal Revenue for the First District of Illinois
- In office 1901–1910
- Appointed by: Theodore Roosevelt
- Preceded by: Frederick E. Coyne
- Succeeded by: Samuel E. Fitch

29th Illinois Treasurer
- In office 1897–1899
- Governor: John R. Tanner
- Preceded by: Henry Wulff
- Succeeded by: Floyd K. Whittemore

22nd Cook County Coroner
- In office 1885–1892
- Preceded by: N.B. Boyden
- Succeeded by: James McHale

Personal details
- Born: November 19, 1847 Copenhagen, Denmark
- Died: July 3, 1926 (aged 78) Chicago, Illinois, United States
- Resting place: Graceland Cemetery, Chicago
- Party: Republican; Progressive

Henry Lamartine Hertz (November 19, 1847 – July 3, 1926) was an American businessman and politician.

== Biography ==
Hertz was born in Copenhagen, Denmark, the son of police inspector Martin Hertz (1817–79) and Henriette C. C. Frohbøse (1823–1904). He graduated from the University of Copenhagen with a degree in medicine in 1866. In 1869, Hertz emigrated to the United States and settled in Chicago, Illinois. He was involved with banking and financial institutes.

Hertz worked as a clerk in the Cook County Recorder's Office. He also worked as a clerk in the Cook County Criminal Court. In 1876, Hertz was West Town clerk.

In 1884, Hertz was elected Cook County Coroner, having been nominated the Republican Party (to which he belonged). He ran 2,000 votes ahead of the rest of the Republican ticket in the 1885 Cook County election.

From 1897 to 1899, Hertz served as Illinois Treasurer. He served as chief clerk of the board of review from 1899 to 1901. From 1901 to 1910, Hertz served as collector of the United States Internal Revenue. In 1912, Hertz supported Theodore Roosevelt and the Progressive Party. Hertz died of a heart attack at his home in Chicago, Illinois. Peter B. Olsen, who served in the Illinois General Assembly, was a close associate of Hertz.

== Notes ==
Party political offices
Preceded by Franz Amberg	Republican nominee for Illinois Treasurer; 1892	Succeeded by Henry Wulff
Preceded by Henry Wulff	Republican nominee for Illinois Treasurer; 1896	Succeeded by Floyd K. Whittemore
Political offices
Preceded by Henry Wulff	Treasurer of Illinois; 1897–1899	Succeeded by Floyd K. Whittemore
