= William James Campbell =

American attorney and politician (1850–1896)

William Campbell
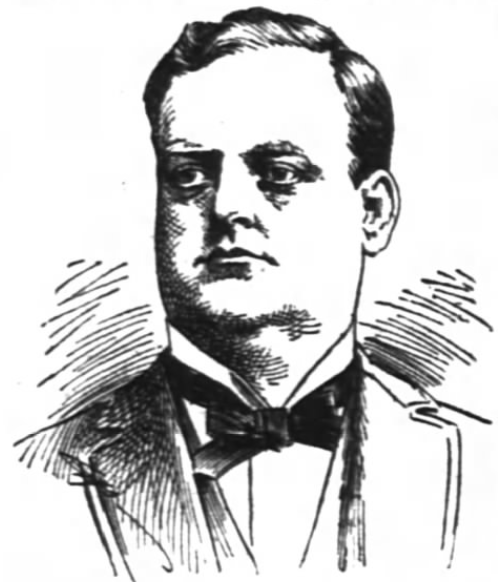

Chair of the Republican National Committee
- In office June 29, 1892 – July 8, 1892
- Preceded by: James S. Clarkson
- Succeeded by: Thomas H. Carter

Lieutenant Governor of Illinois Acting
- In office February 6, 1883 – January 30, 1885
- Governor: John Hamilton
- Preceded by: John Hamilton
- Succeeded by: John Smith

Member of the Illinois Senate from the 7th district
- In office 1878–1886
- Preceded by: Michael Robinson
- Succeeded by: John Humphrey

Personal details
- Born: William James Campbell; December 12, 1850 Philadelphia, Pennsylvania, U.S.
- Died: March 4, 1896 (aged 45) Riverside, Illinois, U.S.
- Party: Republican
- Education: Lake Forest College; University of Pennsylvania (BA); Northwestern University (LLB)

William James Campbell (December 12, 1850 – March 4, 1896) was an American attorney and politician in Illinois. From Pennsylvania, he came with his parents to southern Cook County, Illinois at a young age. Campbell attended public schools, then the University of Pennsylvania and the Union Law School. He co-founded Campbell & Custer, a prominent law firm that represented industries. He served in the Illinois Senate from 1878 to 1886, quickly rising to become its president. From 1883 to 1885, this made him acting Lieutenant Governor of Illinois. After his Senate experience, he returned to his law firm and was a member of the Republican National Committee.

== Biography ==
William James Campbell was born on December 12, 1850, in Philadelphia, Pennsylvania. His parents, John and Mary, immigrated from northern Ireland. When Campbell was a child, they moved to Cook County, Illinois. He attended public school in Bloom Township then matriculated at Lake Forest University. later transferred to the University of Pennsylvania, then was accepted at the Union Law School in Chicago, Illinois. Campbell studied law under William C. Goudy for two years, then was admitted to the bar. He practiced alone for two years, then formed the partnership of Campbell & Custer.

Campbell was elected to the Illinois Senate and served four two-year terms from 1878 to 1886. He was named president pro tempore in 1880, the first to hold the office, serving under John Marshall Hamilton. When Hamilton became Governor of Illinois in 1883, Campbell position made him the Lieutenant Governor of Illinois. He returned to the Senate when Hamilton's term expired, continuing to serve as president pro tempore. He became a close friend of John Riley Tanner in the Senate and the two often collaborated on political projects.

After his years in the senate, Campbell returned to Campbell & Custer in the Rookery Building in Chicago. He represented several large industries there, including Armour and Company. He joined the Republican National Committee in 1891, succeeding George R. Davis. He elected its chairman in 1892, but quickly resigned the office. Campbell was a trustee of the Armour Institute of Technology and was a member of the Chicago and Union League Clubs. He died in Riverside, Illinois on March 4, 1896, after an illness.

Political offices
Preceded by John Hamilton	Lieutenant Governor of Illinois; Acting; 1883–1885	Succeeded by John Smith
Party political offices
Preceded by James S. Clarkson	Chair of the Republican National Committee; 1892	Succeeded by Thomas H. Carter
