= Moses O. Williamson =

Swedish American politician

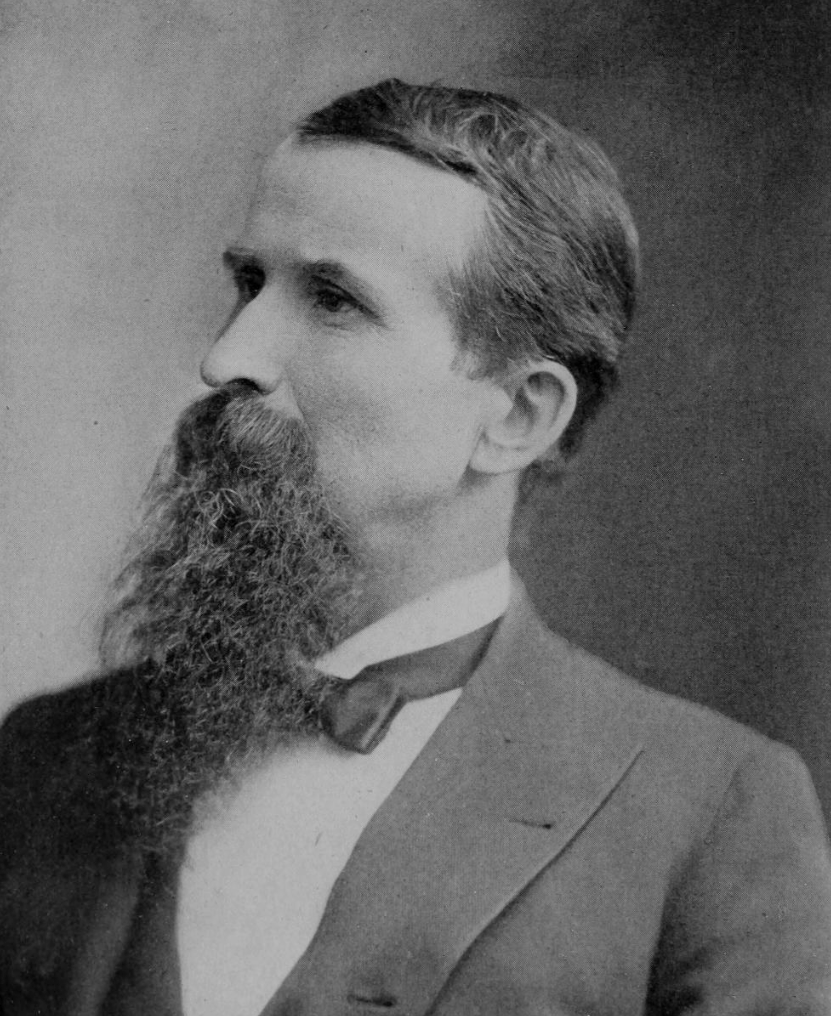
- Moses O. Williamson, c. 1900

23rd Treasurer of Illinois
- In office 1901–1903
- Governor: John R. Tanner; Richard Yates Jr.
- Preceded by: Floyd K. Whittemore
- Succeeded by: Fred A. Busse

President of the Swedish American Republican League of Illinois
- Incumbent
- Assumed office 1897

Knox County Clerk
- Incumbent
- Assumed office 1890

Knox County Treasurer
- Incumbent
- Assumed office 1886

Personal details
- Born: July 14, 1850 At sea, Atlantic Ocean
- Died: February 24, 1935 (aged 84) Galesburg, Illinois
- Party: Republican Party (United States)
- Spouse: Mary Driggs (m. 1871)
- Children: 2 daughters (Addie, Nellie)
- Occupation: Harness maker, politician

Moses O. Williamson (July 14, 1850 – February 24, 1935) was a Swedish American politician, born at sea. Williamson apprenticed and then practiced as a harness maker from 1866 to 1890. During this time, he rose in local politics to county treasurer and clerk. In 1900, Williamson was elected Illinois Treasurer as a Republican, serving a two-year term.

== Biography ==
Moses O. Williamson was born on July 14, 1850, aboard a boat on the Atlantic Ocean while his parents, William and Margaret, were emigrating from Sweden. They settled in Sparta Township, Knox County, Illinois. Moses helped on the family farm until he was twelve, when he went to work on a neighbor's farm. When he was fourteen, Williamson apprenticed as a harness maker in Wataga, Illinois. He trained for three years under Olsen & Gray, then worked a year as a journeyman. Williamson then purchased Gray's share of the partnership, then sold harnesses with Olsen from 1867 to 1879. He then purchased Olsen's share, running the harness shop alone until 1890.

Williamson rose in Wataga politics, serving at various times as justice of the peace, town clerk, and councilman. In 1884, he was named Secretary of the Republican County Central Committee, a role he held for at least 16 years. Williamson was elected Knox County Treasurer in 1886. In 1890, he left his harness shop to move to Galesburg, Illinois, to serve as Knox County Clerk. He was elected to three consecutive four-year terms. After co-founding the Swedish American Republican League of Illinois, Williamson was named its president in 1897. In 1900, Williamson was elected Illinois Treasurer, serving from 1901 to 1903.

Williamson married Mary Driggs on October 18, 1871. They had two surviving daughters: Addie and Nellie. He died at his home in Galesburg on February 24, 1935, due to complications from broken hip.

== See also ==
- List of people born at sea

Party political offices
Preceded by Floyd K. Whittemore	Republican nominee for Illinois Treasurer; 1900	Succeeded by Fred A. Busse
Political offices
Preceded by Floyd K. Whittemore	Treasurer of Illinois; 1901–1903	Succeeded by Fred A. Busse
