= List of people born at sea =

This is a list of notable people born at sea.

| Name | Description | Year | Source |
|---|---|---|---|
| Louis Aldrich | American actor | 1843 | |
| Charles George James Arbuthnot | British general | 1801 | |
| Asmahan | Syrian singer | 1912 | |
| Charles Barbier de Meynard | French historian and orientalist | 1826 | |
| Emily Caroline Barnett | Australian explorer | 1860 | |
| Watson Cheyne, 1st Baronet | British surgeon | 1852 | |
| Westmoreland Davis | Governor of Virginia | 1859 | |
| Emmanuele de Gregorio | Italian cardinal | 1758 | |
| Fausto Bordalo Dias | Portuguese singer | 1947 | |
| Boyle Finniss | First Premier of South Australia | 1807 | |
| Itamar Franco | Former President of Brazil | 1930 | |
| John Paul Getty Jr. | British oil heir | 1932 | |
| E. T. Hooley | Australian explorer | 1842 | |
| Oceanus Hopkins | Only child born on Mayflower voyage 1620 | 1620 | |
| Tommy Hughes | Australian footballer | 1886 | |
| Mary Jemison | American frontierswoman | 1743 | |
| Augustus D. Juilliard | Founder of the Juilliard School | 1836 | |
| Ivan Kelic | Australian soccer player | 1968 | |
| Cyrille Pierre Théodore Laplace | French navigator | 1793 | |
| Francis Lathrop | American artist | 1849 | |
| Wyndham Lewis | British painter | 1882 | |
| René Maran | French poet | 1887 | |
| Rio Antonio Mavuba | French footballer | 1984 | |
| James McGowen | Australian politician | 1855 | |
| Sir Charles Monro, 1st Baronet | British Army officer | 1860 | |
| Roy William Neill | Film director | 1887 | |
| Henry Orth | Architect | 1866 | |
| John L. O'Sullivan | Irish-American columnist | 1813 | |
| Reino Paasilinna | Finnish politician | 1939 | |
| Ed Porray | American baseball player | 1888 | |
| Stamford Raffles | Founder of Singapore | 1781 | |
| Charles E. de M. Sajous | American endocrinologist and laryngologist | 1852 | |
| Ignatius Sancho | British abolitionist | c. 1729 | |
| Jack Soo | American actor | 1917 | |
| Jane Maria Strachey | British suffragist | 1840 | |
| Ralph Webb | Canadian politician | 1886 | |
| William Wentworth | Australian explorer and politician | 1790 | |
| Moses O. Williamson | American politician | 1850 | |
| Arthur Windsor | Australian journalist | 1833 | |
| Simon van der Stel | First Governor of the Dutch Cape Colony | 1639 | |
| Gustavo Rojo | Mexican Actor | 1923 | |
