= Charles H. Wacker =

American businessman and Chicago philanthropist (1856–1929)

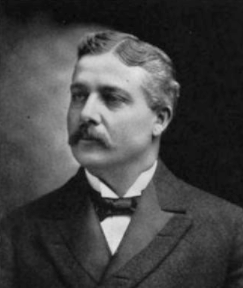

Chairman of the Chicago Plan Commission
- In office 1909–1926
- Appointed by: Fred A. Busse
- Preceded by: office established
- Succeeded by: James Simpson

Personal details
- Born: Charles Henry Wacker; August 29, 1856 Chicago, Illinois
- Died: October 31, 1929 (aged 73) Lake Geneva, Wisconsin
- Resting place: Graceland Cemetery
- Education: University of Stuttgart; University of Geneva
- Occupation: Businessman, philanthropist

Charles Henry Wacker (August 29, 1856 – October 31, 1929) was an American businessman and philanthropist. He was vice chairman of the general committee of the Commercial Club of Chicago, and in 1909 was appointed chairman of the Chicago Plan Commission by Mayor Fred A. Busse. As commission chairman from 1909 to 1926, he championed the Burnham Plan for improving Chicago. His work to promote the plan included addresses, obtaining wide publicity from newspapers, and publishing Wacker's Manual of the Plan of Chicago (by Walter D. Moody) as a textbook for local schoolchildren.

== Life ==
Wacker was born in Chicago, Illinois on August 29, 1856. His father Frederick Wacker, a brewer, was born in Württemberg, Germany. Charles Wacker was educated at Lake Forest Academy (class of 1872) and thereafter at the University of Stuttgart and the University of Geneva. He worked in a commission house until 1880, when he started work in his father's malting firm. After his father died in 1884, Wacker became president of the Wacker and Birk Brewing and Malting Company. He was later president of the McAvoy Brewing Company, and director of the Chicago Heights Land Association, Corn Exchange National Bank, Chicago Title and Trust Company, and South Elevator Company, and was part of a consortium of Chicago brewers who underwrote the methods that facilitated the commercialization of refrigeration machines.

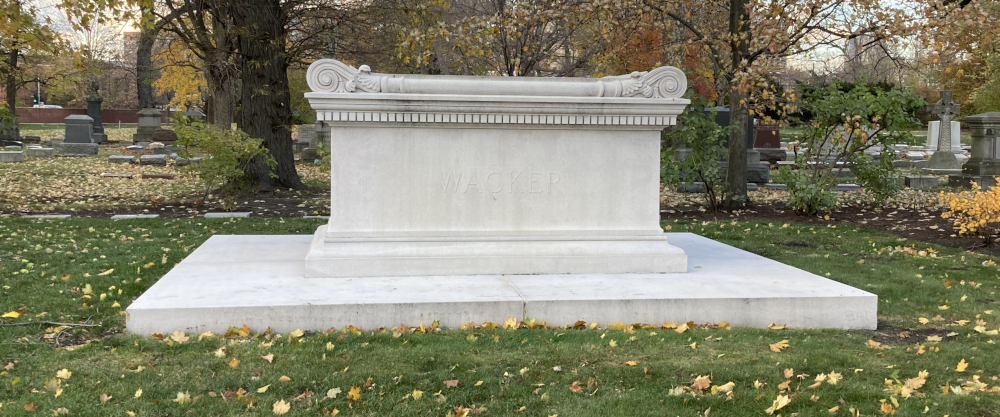
Wacker's grave at Graceland Cemetery

Wacker was a director of the 1893 Columbian Exposition held in Chicago.

He died at his home in Lake Geneva, Wisconsin, on October 31, 1929, and was buried at Graceland Cemetery in Chicago.

Wacker Drive, built as part of the Burnham Plan, and Charles H. Wacker Elementary School are named in his honor.
