= Chicago Plan Commission =

Agency overview
- Formed: November 1, 1909; 116 years ago
- Type: Commission
- Jurisdiction: Chicago, Illinois
- Headquarters: Chicago, Illinois
- Website: chicago.gov/city/en/depts/dcd/chicago-plan-commission.html

The Chicago Plan Commission is a commission implemented to promote the Plan of Chicago, often called the Burnham Plan. After official presentation of the Plan to the city on July 6, 1909, the City Council of Chicago authorized Mayor Fred A. Busse to appoint the members of the Chicago Plan Commission. On November 1, 1909, the City Council approved the appointment of 328 men selected as members of the Commission—men broadly representative of all the business and social interests of the city. Charles H. Wacker was appointed permanent chairman by the Mayor, and served until 1926, when he was succeeded by James Simpson.

Walter Moody was the managing director of the Chicago Plan Commission for nine years until his death in 1920. He was succeeded for 22 years by Eugene Taylor. Moody was renowned for his ingenuity as a spokesperson for the Plan. The Encyclopedia of Chicago recounts one of his more successful acts of salesmanship: "Moody, the salesman nonpareil, even raised the enactment of the Plan to a sacred calling. On Sunday, January 19, 1919, some 80 Chicago churches participated in what were called "Nehemiah Day" services. The ministers of these congregations agreed to take the words of the Old Testament prophet Nehemiah, "Therefore we, His servants, will arise and build," as the basis of their sermons, in which they would advocate the implementation of the Plan of Chicago." Moody also prepared a textbook, Wacker's Manual of the Plan of Chicago, which taught the major aspects of the Plan to a generation of Chicago schoolchildren.

The Commission was successful at fostering relationships with politicians of several types and at encouraging voters to support its initiatives. Between 1912 and 1931, Chicagoans approved 86 Plan-related bond issues covering some 17 different projects.

The commission was reorganized in 1939, becoming part of city government. The name Chicago Plan Commission has persisted through a number of administrative reorganizations; today the Chicago Plan Commission is staffed by the city of Chicago's Department of Zoning and Land Use Planning. Its 18 members adopt plans and review certain proposed developments as advisors to the city council.

== See also ==
- Streets and highways of Chicago
