= Philip Knopf =

American politician (1847–1920)

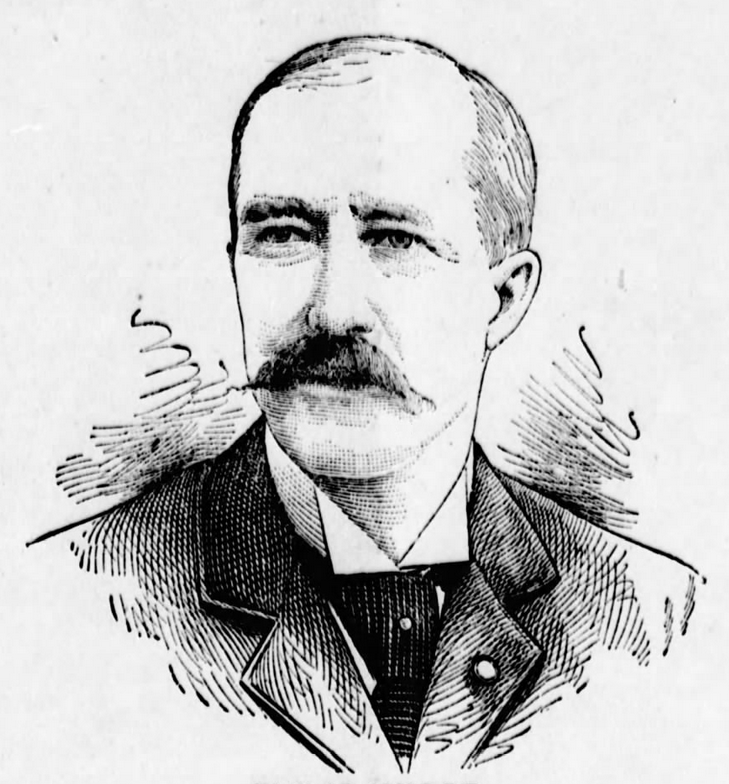

Member of the U.S. House of Representatives from Illinois's 7th district
- In office March 4, 1903 – March 3, 1909
- Preceded by: George Edmund Foss
- Succeeded by: Frederick Lundin

14th Cook County Clerk
- In office 1894–1902
- Preceded by: Henry Wulff
- Succeeded by: Peter B. Olsen

Member of the Illinois Senate
- In office 1886-1894

Personal details
- Born: November 18, 1847 Long Grove, Illinois, US
- Died: August 14, 1920 (aged 72) Chicago, Illinois, US
- Party: Republican

Philip Knopf (November 18, 1847 – August 14, 1920) was a U.S. representative near Long Grove, Illinois.

== Biography ==
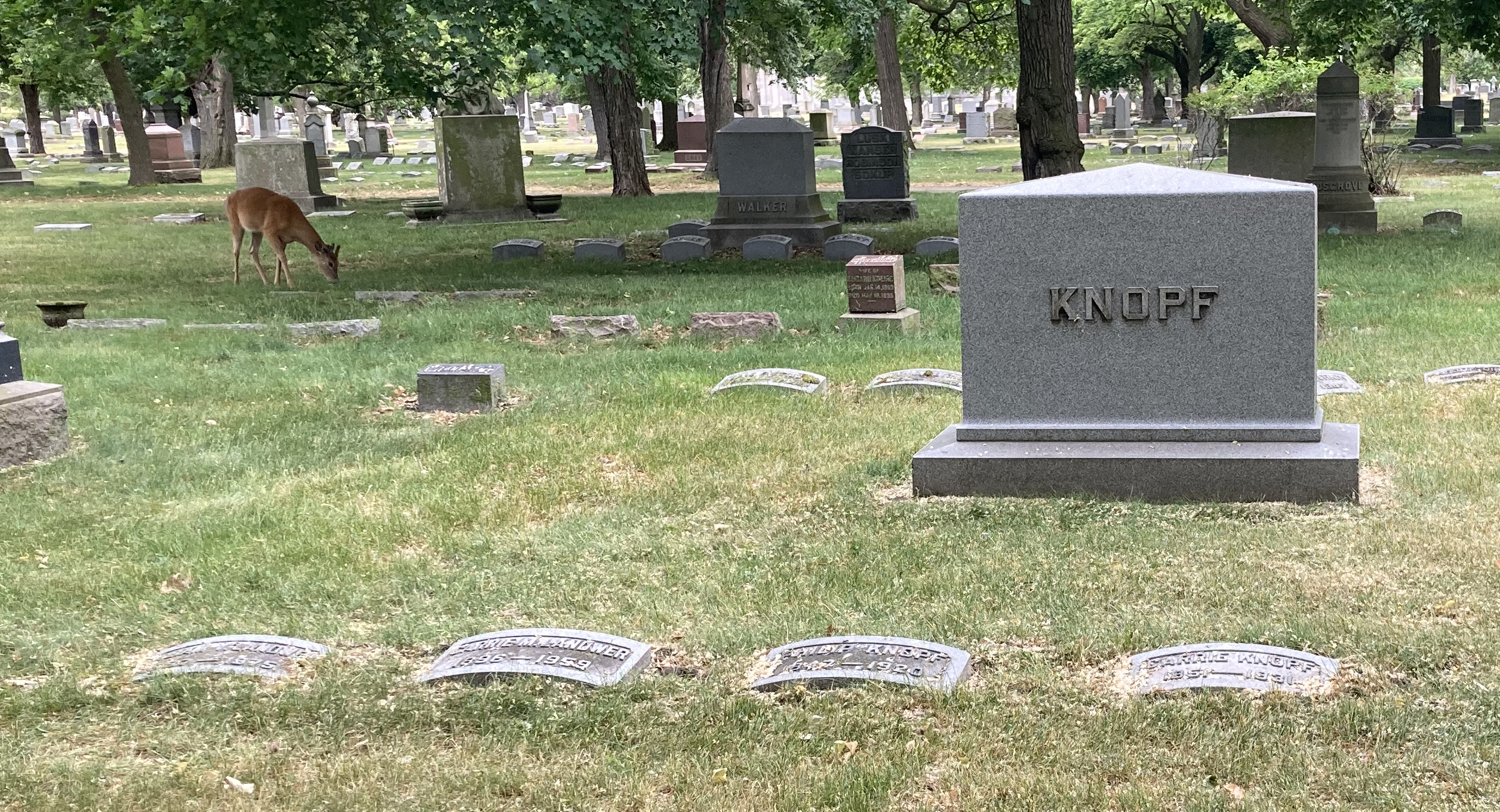
Knopf's grave at Rosehill Cemetery

Born near Long Grove, Illinois, Knopf attended public schools. During the Civil War, he enlisted in Company I, 147th Illinois Volunteer Infantry Regiment, and served until the regiment was mustered out in Savannah, Georgia. He moved to Chicago in 1866 and attended Bryant & Stratton College for one year. He engaged in the teaming business until 1884, when he was appointed chief deputy coroner and served eight years. He served as a member of the Illinois State senate from 1886 to 1894. He served as clerk of Cook County from 1894 to 1902. He served as a delegate to the Republican National Convention in 1896 and as a member of the State Republican central committee.

Knopf was elected as a Republican to the Fifty-eighth, Fifty-ninth, and Sixtieth Congresses (March 4, 1903 – March 3, 1909). He served as chairman of the Committee on Expenditures in the Department of the Treasury (Fifty-ninth and Sixtieth Congresses).

Knopf died in Chicago, Illinois on August 14, 1920. He was interred in Rosehill Cemetery.

U.S. House of Representatives
Preceded by George E. Foss	Member of the U.S. House of Representatives from Illinois's 7th congressional district 1903-1909	Succeeded by Frederick Lundin
