= James Simpson (businessman) =

Scottish-American businessman

James Simpson, Sr. (1874–1939) was a Scottish-American businessman who led Marshall Field & Co. and Commonwealth Edison. He also held directorships at the Federal Reserve Bank of Chicago and companies such as the New York Central Railroad. He also led the Chicago Plan Commission for nine years.

== Early life and education ==
Simpson was born in 1874. In 1880, he immigrated to the United States. In the United States he attended public school and business college.

== Career ==
Simpson began working as a clerk in at Marshall Field & Co., beginning his work in the cashier's office and eventually becoming company head Marshall Field's confidential clerk. After Field's 1906 death, Simpson was made the second Vice President of the company. He worked his way further to become the company's president and the chairman its board. During his time at Marshall Field's & Co., he also held directorships at the Federal Reserve Bank of Chicago, the New York Central Railroad, A.M. Castle & Co., Super Power Company of Illinois, the Western United Gas and Electric Corporation.

In 1926, Simpson succeeded the retiring Charles Wacker as the chairman of the Chicago Plan Commission, a position he held for the next nine years.

Simpson retired from his position at Marshall Field & Co. in 1932 and took a position as the chairman of Commonwealth Edison. He held this position until his death. He also led the Public Service Company of Northern Illinois, the Commonwealth Subsidiary Corporation, and the Public Service Subsidiary Corporation.

== Personal life and death ==
In 1903 or 1904, Simpson married Jessie McLaren. They had three sons together: James Jr., John, and William.

Simpson was a member of numerous social clubs.

Simpson died on November 25, 1939, at the age of 65 while at his personal residence in Chicago. He was survived by his wife and sons. He was buried at Chicago's Graceland Cemetery. The pallbearers at his funeral were Frederick D. Corley (head of Marshall Field & Co.), Marshall Field III, Albert A. Sprague (businessman), John P. Wilson (Chicago alderman), and Charles Y. Freeman (Commonwealth Edison executive).
