= Jacob Gross (Illinois politician) =

German-American businessman and politician

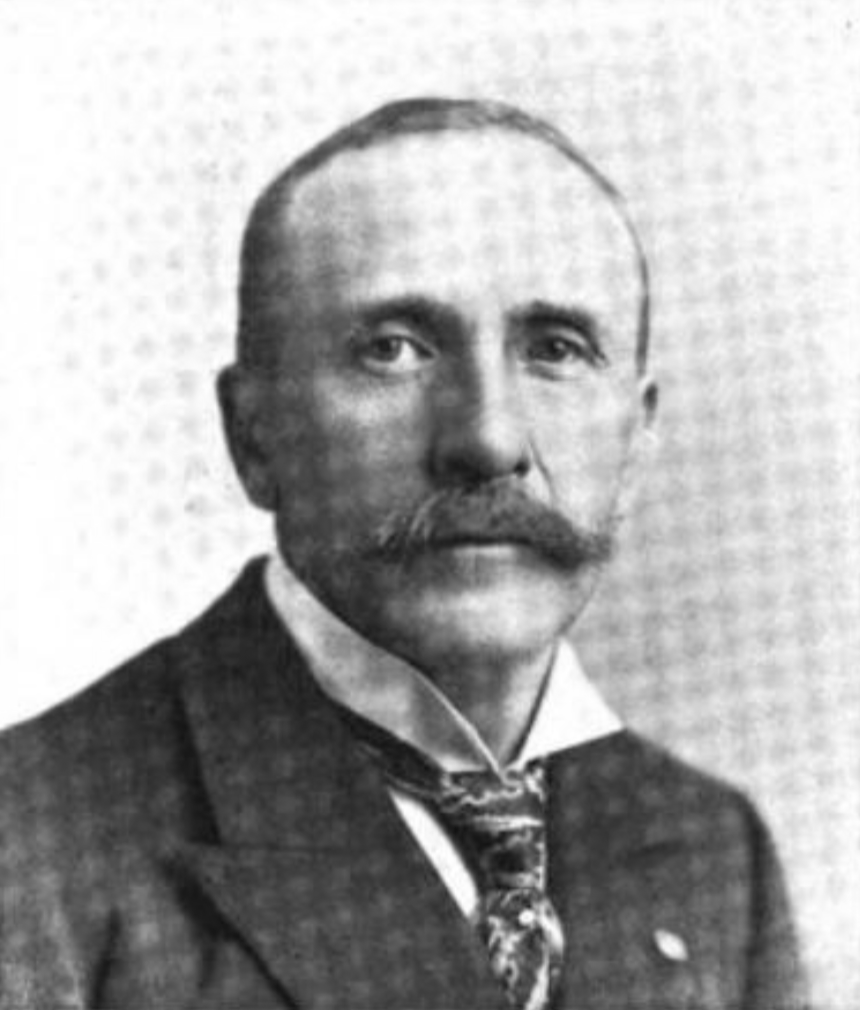

Treasurer of Illinois
- In office 1885–1887
- Governor: Richard J. Oglesby
- Preceded by: John C. Smith
- Succeeded by: John R. Tanner

Clerk of the Circuit Court of Cook County
- In office 1872–1884

Personal details
- Born: February 11, 1840 Germany
- Died: December 29, 1918 (aged 78) Chicago, Illinois, United States
- Party: Republican

Jacob Gross (February 11, 1840 – December 29, 1918) was a German American businessman and politician.

Born in Germany, Gross emigrated to the United States in 1860 and settled in Chicago, Illinois. He went to the Chicago public schools and was a tinsmith. He was also a store clerk. Gross served in the 82nd Illinois Volunteer Infantry Regiment and was wounded in his leg which had to be amputated. After the civil war, Gross served in public office including police court clerk and Clerk of the Circuit Court of Cook County . From 1885 to 1887, Gross served as Illinois State Treasurer. He then was involved in the bank business. Gross died at his home in Chicago, Illinois.

== Notes ==
Party political offices
Preceded by John C. Smith	Republican nominee for Illinois Treasurer; 1884	Succeeded by John Riley Tanner
Political offices
Preceded by John C. Smith	Treasurer of Illinois; 1885–1887	Succeeded by John R. Tanner
