= 1907 Chicago mayoral election =

- April 2, 1907
- Turnout: 86% ▲5 pp
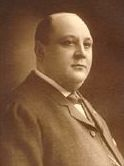

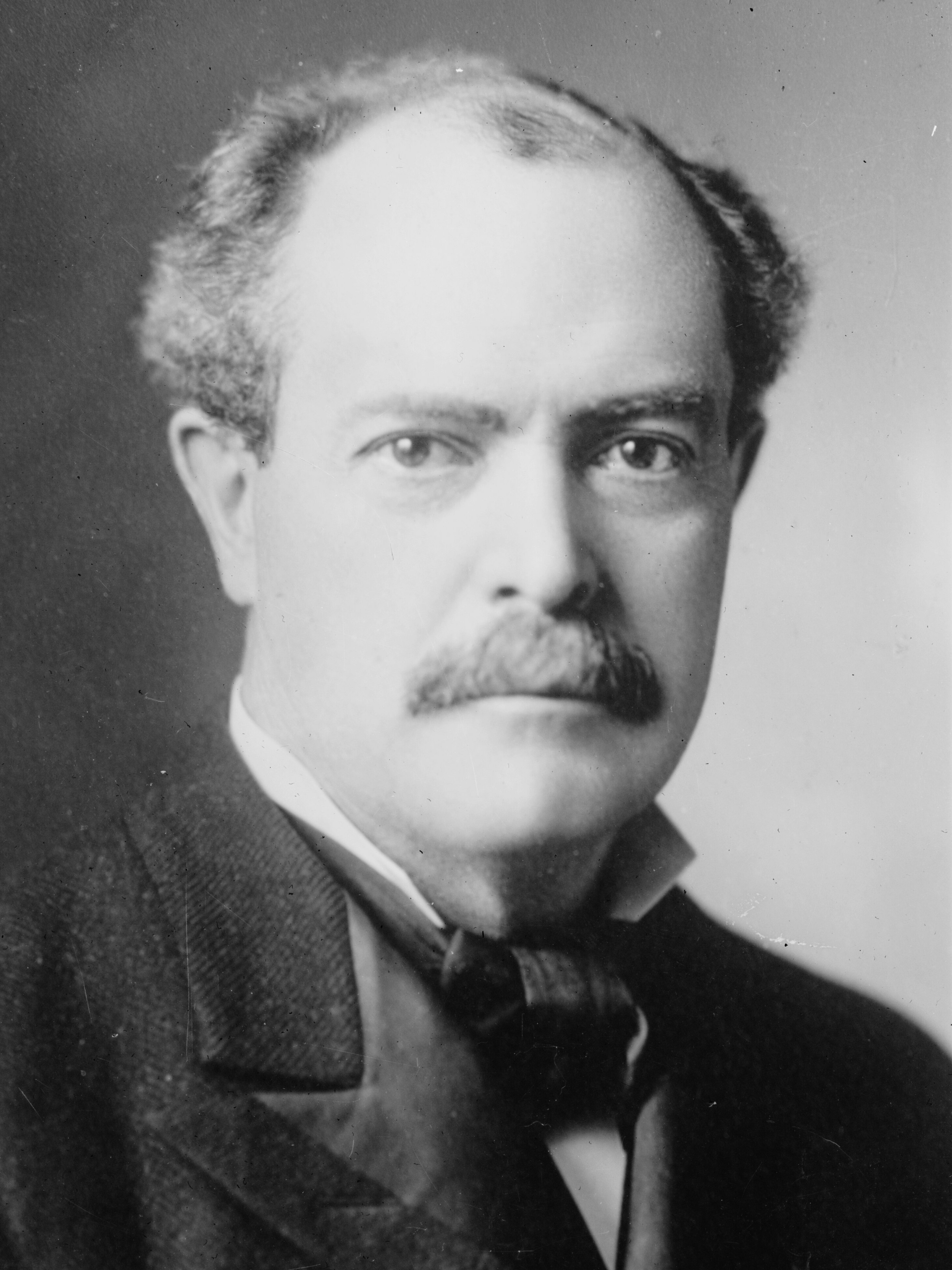
Nominee	Fred A. Busse	Edward Fitzsimmons Dunne
Party	Republican	Democratic
Popular vote	164,702	151,779
Percentage	49.03%	45.18%
Mayor before election
Edward F. Dunne
Democratic
Elected mayor
Fred A. Busse
Republican

In the Chicago mayoral election of 1907, Republican Fred A. Busse defeated Democratic incumbent Edward F. Dunne.

This was the first mayoral election to a four-year term in Chicago's history, as terms had been extended from two to four years. The election took place on April 2.

In order to select their nominee, the Democratic Party held a primary election open to members at its municipal party convention. Mayor Dunne was challenged by former mayor Carter Harrison IV Dunne defeated Harrison in the primary by a strong margin.

== Democratic nomination ==
Dunne was able to defeat a challenge from former mayor Carter Harrison IV for the nomination.

Harrison had secured support from a number of ward bosses (including Robert E. Burke and John Powers) as well as the Sullivan-Hopkins wing of the party. On February 21, Dunne won the primary held at the Democratic convention. He won 624 votes to Harrison's 259.

== Republican nomination ==
The Republican nomination was won by Chicago Postmaster Fred A. Busse.

The few speeches Busse delivered when seeking the mayoralty had focused primarily on the desire to adopt a business-style approach to government and to develop a "greater Chicago". Busse was the sort of candidate which many Republicans had been hoping to nominate for mayor. He was a loyal party member who was scandal-free. There was some hope that Busse, being of the son of German immigrants, might also be a candidate that could appeal to some of Chicago's traditionally-Democratic ethnic voters.

During his time in government, Busse had proven himself to be a competent individual that had made himself accessible to constituents. Busse had made few rivals during his time in government. He was considered to be a relatively unobjectionable personality. While Busse was the North Side Republican political boss, he had refrained from involving himself in the corrupt activities which often accompanied machine politics.

Seeing themselves as having strong odds of taking back the mayoralty for the first time in more than a decade, the Republicans believed Busse was an individual that the party could unite around.

== Third-party nominations ==
William A. Brubaker won the Prohibition nomination. George Koop won the Socialist nomination.

== General election ==
=== Campaign ===
The election campaign was particularly contentious. Additionally, a large amount of cash was expended in the election.

The Chicago Traction Wars was an ongoing controversy in Chicago. As a result, a key issue in the election was transit. Busse supported the Settlement Ordinances of 1907, while Dunne was against them and was instead in favor of immediate municipal ownership. A voter referendum on the ordinance was held coinciding to the mayoral election.

Busse supported the proposed new municipal charter that was awaiting ratification in the state legislature, while Dunne strongly opposed it. To appease the concern of the city's ethnic community, which were opposed to the ordinance's impact of imposing Sunday dry laws on Chicago, Busse promised the United Societies that, in exchange for their support, he would lobby the state legislature to also pass legislation give Chicago amnesty from state liquor laws.

Early into the campaign Busse received a minor injury in a train crash while traveling back to Chicago from Washington, D.C. Republican newspapers fostered the public's sympathy for Dunne, contrasting the healthy Dunne with a maimed Busse.

Busse held delivered no speeches and attended no rallies during the general election campaign. A man who disliked public speaking, Busse used his injuries as an excuse to avoid it during the election. Instead, surrogates such as Illinois Attorney General William H. Stead campaigned on Busse's behalf.

Republicans tried to paint Dunne as being a creature of the political machine. Dunne in fact was, by the standards of the era, not strongly connected with machine politics. While accusing Dunne of this, Republican ignored their own candidate's involvement in machine politics. Republicans accused Dunne of corrupt vote-buying, while at the same time defending Busse against similar accusations by declaring him to be someone who "just simply helps the sick and poor and lightens the load of poverty" by handing out jobs, cash, and coal (from his coal company) to constituents on the North Side.

A hot button issue which Busse's camp did not seize upon was the School Board, the composition of which had undergone a radical change in the previous two years due to appointments Dunne had made to the dismay of the city's Republican business community.

Dunne entered the general election as a vulnerable incumbent. Dunne had upset many voters by taking stances which many, variably, regarded to either be too extreme or too moderate. The Democratic Party had not solidified its support behind his candidacy, weakening Dunne's chances of a general election victory. Dunne had also made enemies of a number of Democratic ward bosses, losing key allies that otherwise might have helped deliver him votes.

Dunne was regarded by some to be a socialist. Under his mayoralty, some critics considered Chicago to be the "most radical city in America" Critics characterized his administration as having been composed of "long-haired friends" of Dunne and "short-haired women."

Dunne's positions were relatively mainstream among municipal reformers ("social reformers" and "urban liberals") . Like other municipal reformers, Dunne favored having political power be shared with the lower echelons of society rather than being exclusively held by the upper echelons. He also was supportive of labor unions. He was tolerant towards ethnic and cultural diversity and also tolerant towards those with disabilities and impairments. He was a contemporary with progressive leaders in other American cities, including Tom L. Johnson, Samuel M. Jones, Hazen Pingree, and Brand Whitlock. He was also a contemporary of progressive Republicans such as Jersey City mayor Mark Pagan.

Dunne's campaign strategy was to stress party loyalty in traditionally Democratic wards and to promote his stance on municipal ownership in the wards where it had appeared to assist his 1905 campaign.

Dunne campaigned tirelessly, delivering frequent speeches.

The only newspapers to support Dunne's candidacy were those owned by William Randolph Hearst. This created another problem for Dunne, with Dunne needing to defend the fact that he was supported by the polarizing Hearst.

Materials opposing Dunne and supporting the Settlement Ordinances were distributed by two political action committees. These were the Chicago Non-Partisan Traction Settlement Association (funded by the Real Estate Board and the Commercial Association, who were also sponsoring the Plan of Chicago) and the Straphanger League. Traction and liquor interests (both of which opposed Dunne) also spent heavily in the municipal elections, expending as much as $600,000.

The public debate about traction became very heated during the campaign.

The Chicago Tribune backed Busse's candidacy, while newspapers owned by William Randolph Hearst's company backed Dever. Several lawsuits were filed for libel relating to newspaper coverage during the campaign.

=== Results ===
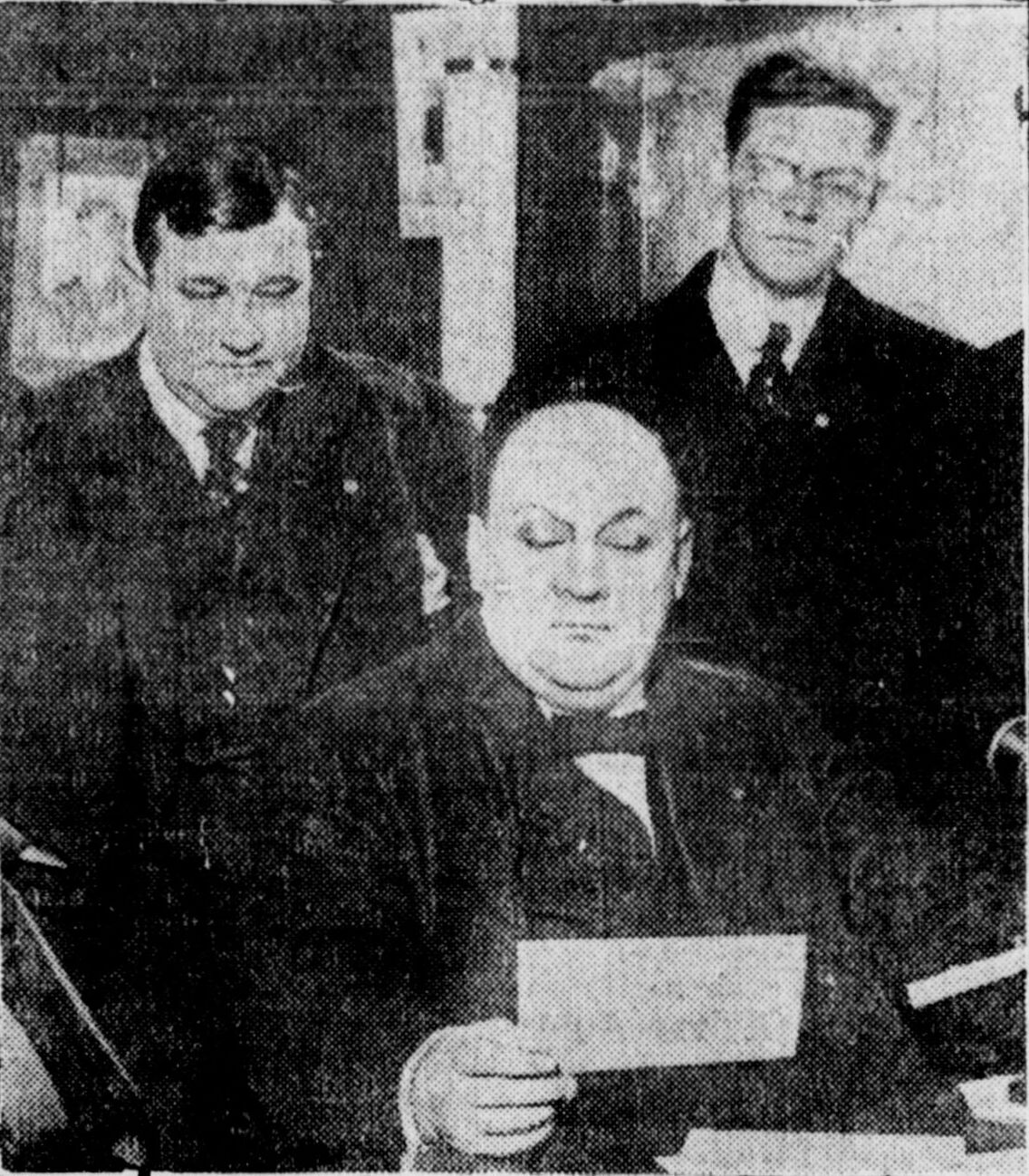
Buse (center) receiving election results indicating his victory

Busse's number of votes was the most votes any candidate had ever received in a Chicago mayoral election, up to that time.

1907 Chicago mayoral election
Party	Candidate	Votes	%
Republican	Fred A. Busse	164,702	49.03
Democratic	Edward F. Dunne (incumbent)	151,779	45.18
Socialist	George Koop	13,429	4.00
Prohibition	William A. Brubaker	6,020	1.79
Turnout		335,930	86

In the coinciding referendum, voters approved the Settlement Ordinances. The results by ward showed a 90% correlation between the mayoral election and the Settlement Ordinances referendum results.

Busse received 31.89% of the Polish-American vote while Dunne received 65.44% and Koop received 2.29%.

The German American vote was seen as having gone overwhelmingly to Busse.

The election result was closer than many Republicans had been anticipating. Many Republicans believed Busse would win by a margin of between 30,000 and 40,000 votes, considerably greater than the mere 13,000 vote margin he actually won by.

In coinciding elections, Republican John R. McCabe defeated Democrat Thomas F. Little for City Clerk and Democrat John E. Traeger defeated Republican Edward C. Young for City Treasurer. Additionally, Republicans won both seats on the Superior Court of Cook County that had coinciding elections. Republican O.J. Novak won the coinciding special election to fill a vacant seat on the Sanitary District's board of trustees.
