= John C. Smith (politician) =

American military officer and politician

John Corson Smith
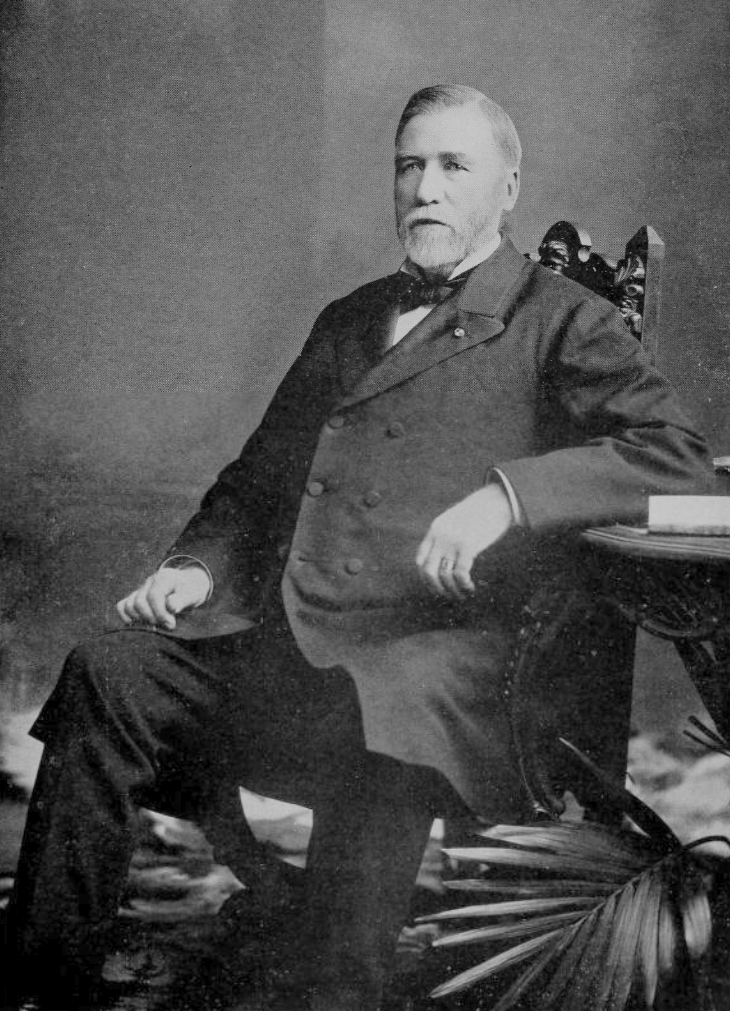

24th Lieutenant Governor of Illinois
- In office January 30, 1885 – January 14, 1889
- Governor: Richard J. Oglesby
- Preceded by: William J. Campbell
- Succeeded by: Lyman Ray

18th Illinois Treasurer
- In office January 5, 1883 – January 29, 1885
- Governor: Shelby M. Cullom; John M. Hamilton
- Preceded by: Edward Rutz
- Succeeded by: Jacob Gross
- In office January 13, 1879 – January 9, 1881
- Governor: Shelby M. Cullom
- Preceded by: Edward Rutz
- Succeeded by: Edward Rutz

Personal details
- Born: February 13, 1832 Philadelphia, Pennsylvania
- Died: December 31, 1910 (aged 78) Chicago, Illinois
- Party: Republican
- Spouse: Charlotte A. Gallaher
- Profession: Soldier, tax assessor
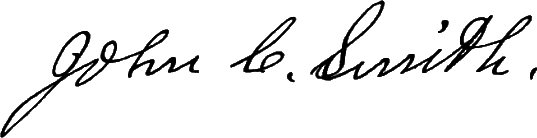
- Signature

Military service
- Allegiance: United States of America; Union
- Branch/service: Union Army
- Years of service: 1861–1865
- Rank: Lieutenant Colonel; Bvt. Brigadier General
- Unit: 96th Illinois Volunteer Infantry Regiment
- Battles/wars: American Civil War: Battle of Chickamauga; Battle of Kennesaw Mountain

John Corson Smith (February 13, 1832 – December 31, 1910) was an American military officer and politician from Pennsylvania. Coming to Galena, Illinois in 1854, Smith first practiced carpentry before receiving a commission at a customhouse. Smith fought in the American Civil War with the 96th Illinois Volunteer Infantry Regiment and was brevetted a brigadier general for his actions at the Battle of Chickamauga. Returning to Galena, Smith work in Internal Revenue until moving to Chicago, Illinois in 1874. There, he was named Chief Grain Inspector, then was elected Illinois Treasurer (1879–1881, 1883–1885). He was elected Lieutenant Governor of Illinois in 1884. Smith was also a prominent Freemason, leading the Illinois chapter and serving as Grand Scribe for twenty-five years.

== Biography ==
John Corson Smith was born in Philadelphia, Pennsylvania, on February 13, 1832. Smith apprenticed as a carpenter and builder. He came to Chicago, Illinois in 1854, but stayed only briefly before removing to Galena, Illinois. He worked there as a carpenter for the next five years. In 1859, he was appointed Assistant Superintendent of the U.S. Custom House and Post Office in nearby Dubuque, Iowa.

Upon the outbreak of the Civil War in 1861, Smith enlisted as a private with the 74th Illinois Volunteer Infantry Regiment. Later that year, he raised Company I of the 96th Illinois Volunteer Infantry Regiment and was named its major when the regiment was approved. The unit was eventually attached to the Military Division of the Mississippi, led by fellow Galena resident Ulysses S. Grant. He was brevetted a brigadier general for his actions at the Battle of Chickamauga. Smith was badly wounded at the Battle of Kennesaw Mountain, but survived.

When the war ended, Smith returned to Galena and was named Assistant Assessor of the Internal Revenue for Jo Daviess County. Smith left Galena in 1874 to return to Chicago, where he was named manager of the Penn Mutual Life Insurance Company office. Later that year, he served as secretary of the Board of Centennial Commissioners of Illinois. In 1875, Smith was named Chief Grain Inspector of the City of Chicago. Smith was elected Illinois Treasurer as a Republican in 1878 to a two-year term and was re-elected four years later. On a ticket with Richard J. Oglesby, Smith was elected Lieutenant Governor of Illinois in 1884. He toured the world in 1894–95 as part of a book deal; the book was entitled Around the World with Gen. John C. Smith.

Smith married Charlotte A. Gallaher in 1856; they had three sons and one daughter. He served as Grand Commander of the Grand Army of the Republic, Department of Illinois chapter. Smith was a prominent Mason, first joining the organization in 1859. He held many high positions in the fraternity, including Grand Commander of the Knights Templar in 1880. He was on the Committee of Correspondence, was on the Masonic Veterans' Association, and was a 33rd degree Emeritus Venerable Chief ad vitam, having served as Grand Master of Illinois in 1881. Smith was Grand Scribe of the Grand Encampment for twenty-five years. He died in Chicago on December 31, 1910, and was buried in Greenwood Cemetery in Galena.

Party political offices
Preceded by Edward Rutz	Republican nominee for Illinois Treasurer; 1884	Succeeded by Edward Rutz
Preceded by Edward Rutz	Republican nominee for Illinois Treasurer; 1882	Succeeded by Jacob Gross
Preceded by John Marshall Hamilton	Republican nominee for Lieutenant Governor of Illinois; 1884	Succeeded by Lyman Beecher Ray
Political offices
Preceded by Edward Rutz	Treasurer of Illinois; 1879–1881	Succeeded by Edward Rutz
Preceded by Edward Rutz	Treasurer of Illinois; 1883–1885	Succeeded by Jacob Gross
Preceded by William J. Campbell	Lieutenant Governor of Illinois; 1885–1889	Succeeded by Lyman Ray
