= John M. Hamilton House =

Historic house in Illinois, United States

- U.S. National Register of Historic Places
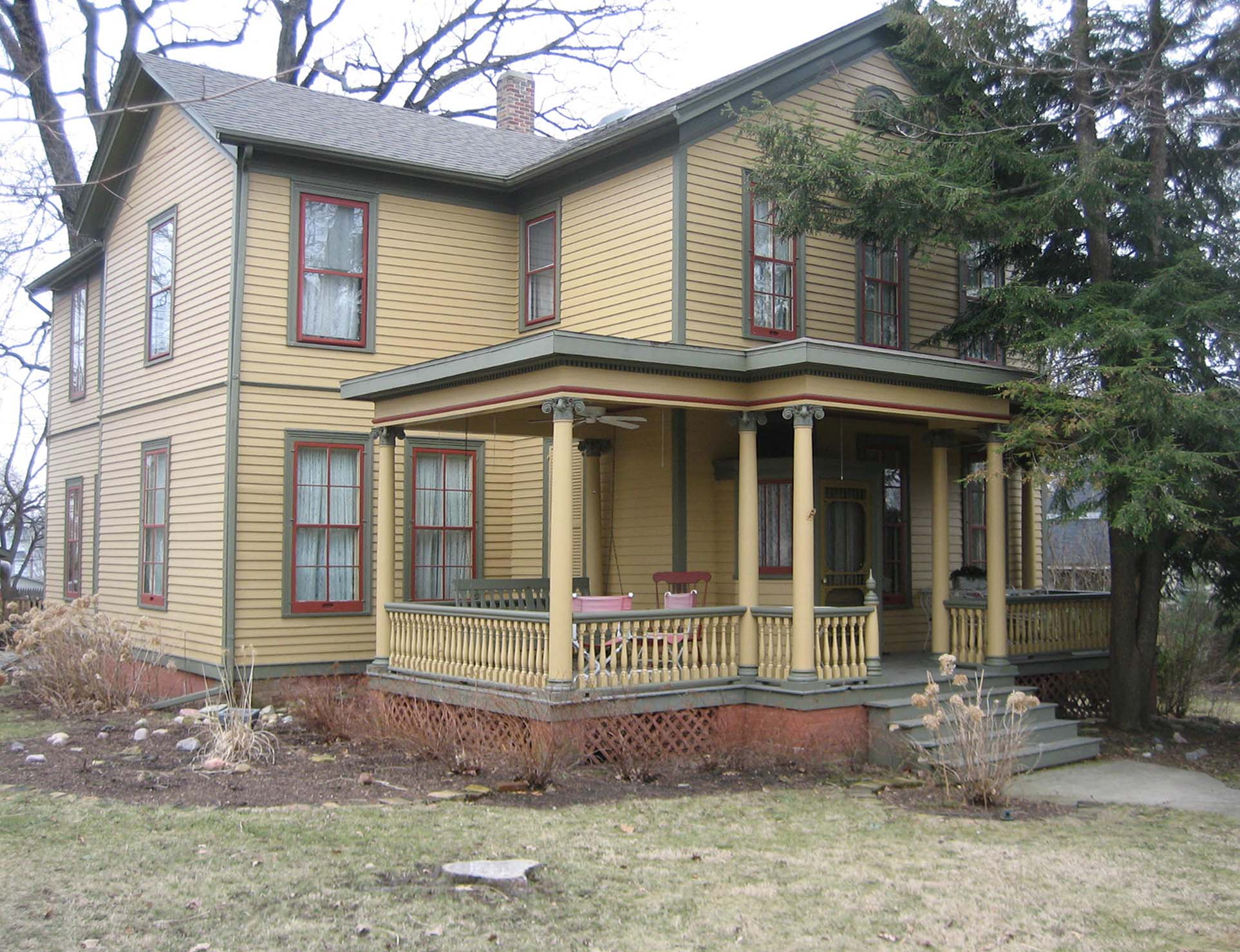

- Location within Illinois Location within the United States
- Location: 502 S. Clayton St., Bloomington, Illinois
- Coordinates: 40°28′39″N 88°59′1″W
- Area: less than one acre
- Built: 1872
- NRHP reference No.: 78003110
- Added to NRHP: September 6, 1978

The John M. Hamilton House is a historic house located at 502 South Clayton Street in Bloomington, Illinois. John Marshall Hamilton, who served as governor of Illinois from 1883 to 1885, lived in the house prior to becoming governor. The house was built circa 1872 by fur trader James Clark, who sold the property to Hamilton in 1873. Hamilton's state political service began while he lived in the house, as he was elected to the Illinois Senate in 1876; he served in the senate for four years and became president pro tem in 1879. In 1881, Hamilton was elected lieutenant governor under Shelby Moore Cullom; when Cullom became a U.S. Senator, Hamilton assumed the governorship. Hamilton left his house upon taking office and never returned to Bloomington.

The house was added to the National Register of Historic Places on September 6, 1978.
