= Henry Wulff (Illinois politician) =

German American politician (1854–1907)

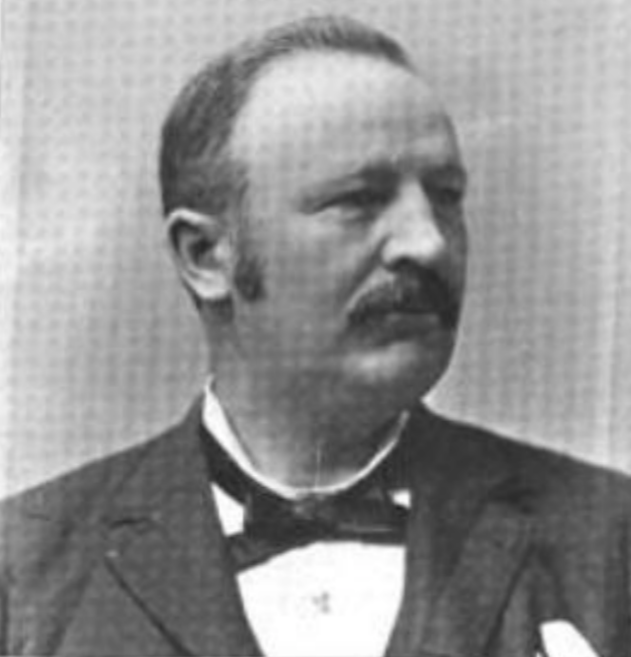

Treasurer of Illinois
- In office 1895–1897
- Governor: John Peter Altgeld
- Preceded by: Elijah P. Ramsay
- Succeeded by: Henry L. Hertz

13th Clerk of Cook County
- In office 1886–1894
- Preceded by: Michael W. Ryan
- Succeeded by: Philip Knopf

Personal details
- Born: August 24, 1854 Meldorf, German Confederation
- Died: December 27, 1907 (aged 53) Chicago, Illinois, United States
- Party: Republican

Henry Wulff (August 24, 1854 – December 27, 1907) was a German American Republican politician who served as Clerk of Cook County from 1886 to 1894 and as Treasurer of Illinois from 1895 to 1897. At the time of the 1890 election for Cook County Clerk, he was the only man to have successfully won reelection to the office. He was a delegate to the 1892 Republican National Convention. He was later indicted by the state for embezzling thousands of dollars while serving as Treasurer, which he was forced to repay by the courts.

Party political offices
Preceded by Henry L. Hertz	Republican nominee for Illinois Treasurer; 1894	Succeeded by Henry L. Hertz
