= Rio Mavuba =

French footballer (born 1984)

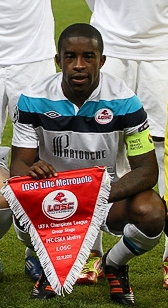
- Mavuba lining up for Lille in 2011

Personal information
- Full name: Rio Antonio Zoba Mavuba
- Date of birth: 8 March 1984 (age 42)
- Place of birth: Born at sea
- Height: 1.72 m (5 ft 8 in)
- Position: Midfielder

Youth career
- 2002–2003: Bordeaux

Senior career*
Years	Team	Apps	(Gls)
2003–2007	Bordeaux	127	(1)
2007–2008	Villarreal	5	(0)
2008	→ Lille (loan)	17	(1)
2008–2017	Lille	282	(4)
2017–2018	Sparta Prague	11	(0)
2018–2019	FCE Mérignac-Arlac	12	(0)
2024–2025	Bordeaux B	3	(0)
Total		455	(6)

International career
2003	DR Congo U21	1	(0)
2004–2006	France U21	21	(1)
2004–2014	France	13	(0)

Managerial career
- 2026: Bordeaux
- * Club domestic league appearances and goals as of 08:59, 10 April 2026

Rio Antonio Zoba Mavuba (born 8 March 1984) is a French football manager and former footballer.

He spent most of his professional career with Bordeaux and Lille, winning the 2011 national championship with the latter.

A France international between 2004 and 2014, Mavuba represented the country at the 2014 World Cup.

== Early and personal life ==
Mavuba's father was Mavuba Mafuila, a footballer who appeared at the 1974 FIFA World Cup with Zaire, while his mother was an Angolan national. He was born on board a boat in international waters during the period of the Angolan Civil War, and later stated that his birth certificate did not have a nationality on it, reading only "born at sea". His nephew Kenny also became a footballer, in the French lower leagues.

Mavuba's mother died when he was two, and his father when he was 12 years old. He launched himself into football to help deal with his grief.

== Club career ==
=== Bordeaux ===
Mavuba played youth football with Bordeaux. He made his Ligue 1 debut on 10 January 2004 in a 2–1 away win against Montpellier and, under recently appointed manager Michel Pavon, became an immediate first-choice.

From the 2004–05 season until the end of his spell, Mavuba never appeared in less than 32 league matches.

=== Villarreal and Lille ===
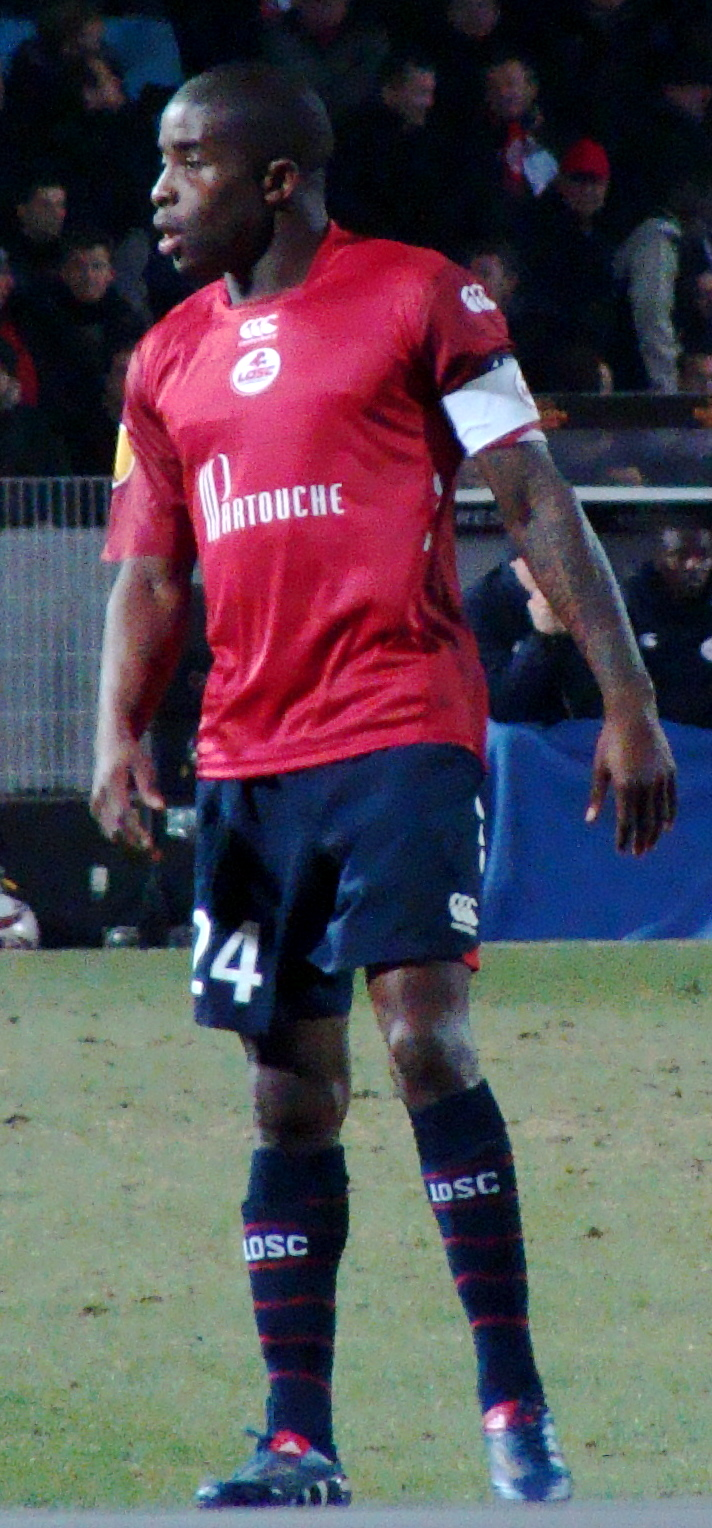
Mavuba playing for Lille in 2010

On 3 July 2007, Mavuba signed a five-year contract with Villarreal worth €7 million, as the Spanish side had lost Alessio Tacchinardi who returned to Juventus following a loan. He found it hard to break into the first team, only totalling 219 minutes in La Liga, and in late January 2008 joined Lille on loan until the end of the season.

The transfer was made subsequently permanent in summer 2008, with the player penning a four-year contract for a reported fee of €7 million. He appeared in 46 matches between the league and the Coupe de France in his third year, helping Les Dogues win both competitions, the former after a 57-year wait.

Mavuba suffered a knee injury midway through the 2012–13 season, being sidelined for more than three months. On 22 December 2013, the team captain scored his first goal of the new campaign, helping to a 2–2 draw at Paris Saint-Germain and being involved in a scuffle with Zlatan Ibrahimović, with both players being booked late into the first half.

On 26 May 2015, Mavuba signed a new four-year deal with Lille.

=== Later career ===
On 21 July 2017, 33-year-old Mavuba agreed to a three-year contract with Czech club Sparta Prague. He returned to his adopted homeland on 14 September 2018, signing with Championnat National 3 amateurs FCE Mérignac-Arlac.

Mavuba was appointed manager of his last team in April 2019. In October 2020, he became assistant coach at Bordeaux's reserves. On 28 August 2024, it was announced that Mavuba had come out of retirement to help out his former club Bordeaux, recently relegated to the Championnat National 2. Mavuba ended his term at Bordeaux in August 2026, leaving the club by mutual agreement.

== International career ==
In December 2003, Mavuba played a friendly match with the DR Congo national under-21 team. He was also eligible to play for Angola.

From the 2004 Toulon Tournament to the 2006 UEFA European Championship, he served as captain of the French under-21s.

Mavuba won his first cap for the senior France side on 18 August 2004, in a 1–1 friendly draw with Bosnia and Herzegovina in Rennes. He then turn down Claude Le Roy's invitations to play for DR Congo national team.

Mavuba was selected by coach Didier Deschamps for his 2014 FIFA World Cup squad. He made his debut in the competition on 15 June, coming on as a second-half substitute for Yohan Cabaye in a 3–0 group stage win against Honduras.

== Honours ==
Bordeaux

- Coupe de la Ligue: 2006–07

Lille

- Ligue 1: 2010–11
- Coupe de France: 2010–11
