= John Cusey =

American politician (1822–1903)

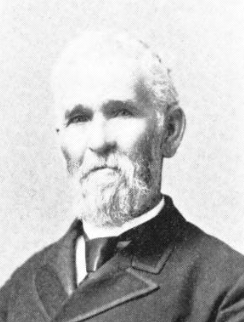

Member of the Illinois Senate from the 28th district
- In office 1872 – 1876
- Succeeded by: John Marshall Hamilton

Personal details
- Born: April 9, 1822 Ashland County, Ohio, US
- Died: March 19, 1903 (aged 80) McLean County, Illinois, US
- Party: Republican
- Spouse: Hannah Bishop (m. 1843)
- Profession: Carpenter

John Cusey (April 9, 1822 – March 19, 1903) was an American politician from Ohio. He was the first Illinois State Senator from McLean County, serving two two-year terms.

== Biography ==
John Cusey was born in Ashland County, Ohio, on April 9, 1822. Cusey descended from an aristocratic English family. Unable to inherit the family lands, Cusey's grandfather came to the United States during the American Revolution. Cusey came with his family to McLean County, Illinois, in the fall of 1836. Cusey worked as a clerk for Jesse Funk for twenty-five years. Funk was a wealthy hog rancher, but struggled to track his finances. He also made cabinets, a trade he learned from his father Job. He ran many of the county's sawmills and built several early houses.

Cusey married Hannah Bishop on November 23, 1843. A longtime abolitionist, he became involved with the Republican Party upon its formation in the 1850s. He was elected township assessor eight times. In 1865, Cusey was elected Township Supervisor and served for two years. In 1872, Cusey was elected to the Illinois Senate, the first from the county, serving for four years. Cusey became a farmer in Farmer City after retiring from the Senate. He served on the State Board of Equalization from 1880 to 1884. Cusey was active in Freemasonry and was a Methodist. He died at his home near Heyworth, Illinois on March 19, 1903, and was buried in Shiloh Cemetery in Heyworth.
