= George E. Foss =

American politician (1863-1936)

George Edmund Foss
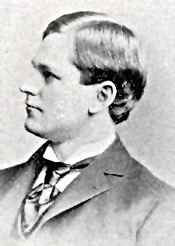

Member of the U.S. House of Representatives from Illinois
- In office March 4, 1915 – March 3, 1919
- Preceded by: Charles M. Thomson
- Succeeded by: Carl R. Chindblom
- Constituency: 10th district
- In office March 4, 1903 – March 3, 1913
- Preceded by: George W. Prince
- Succeeded by: Charles M. Thomson
- Constituency: 10th district
- In office March 4, 1895 – March 3, 1903
- Preceded by: Thomas J. Henderson
- Succeeded by: Philip Knopf
- Constituency: 7th district

Personal details
- Born: July 2, 1863 Berkshire, Vermont, U.S.
- Died: March 15, 1936 (aged 72) Chicago, Illinois, U.S.
- Party: Republican

George Edmund Foss (July 2, 1863 – March 15, 1936) was a U.S. representative from Illinois. He was a brother of Eugene Noble Foss.

== Life and career ==
Foss was born on July 2, 1863, in Berkshire, Vermont. He was a brother of Eugene Noble Foss. Foss attended the common schools, and graduated from Harvard University in 1885.

He attended Columbia Law School and the School of Political Science at Columbia University in New York City. In 1889 he graduated from Union College of Law at Chicago, Illinois, was admitted to the bar and commenced the practice of law in Chicago.

Foss was elected as a Republican to the Fifty-fourth and eight succeeding Congresses (March 4, 1895 - March 3, 1913). He served as chairman of the Committee on Naval Affairs (Fifty-sixth through Sixty-first Congresses).

On March 29, 1907, residents in the North Chicago, Illinois, incorporated Foss Park District to honor him. The Park District's largest park (Foss Park) bears his name as well.

He was an unsuccessful candidate for re-election in 1912. Foss was elected to the Sixty-fourth and Sixty-fifth Congresses (March 4, 1915 - March 3, 1919).

He was not a candidate for renomination to Congress in 1918, but was an unsuccessful candidate for nomination to the United States Senate. He resumed the practice of law. He was an unsuccessful candidate for nomination in 1932 to the Seventy-third Congress.

He died on March 15, 1936, in Chicago, and was interred in Graceland Cemetery.

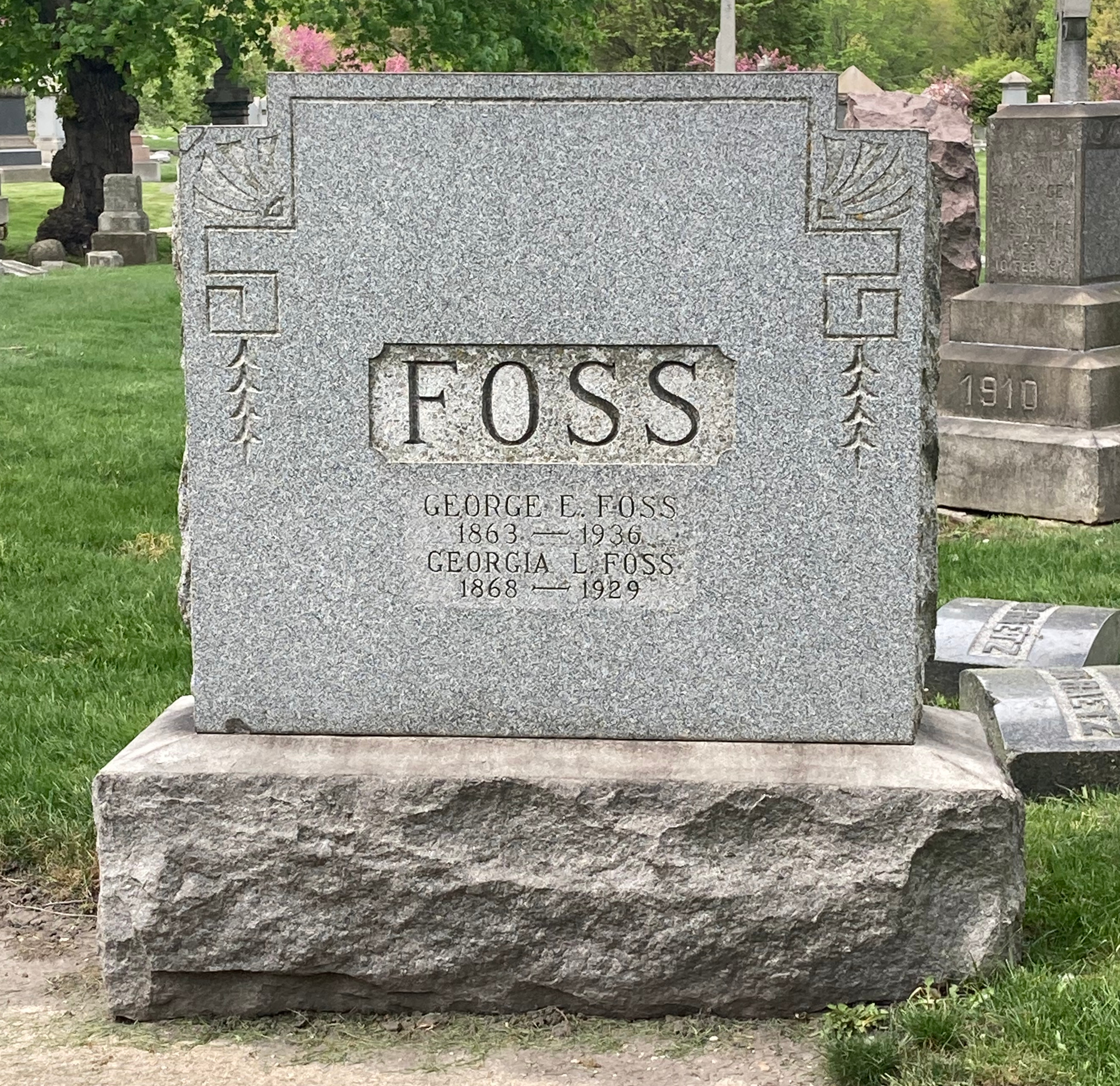
Foss' grave

== See also ==
- William D. Boyce

U.S. House of Representatives
Preceded by Thomas J. Henderson	Member of the U.S. House of Representatives from Illinois's 7th congressional district 1895-1903	Succeeded by Philip Knopf
Preceded by George W. Prince	Member of the U.S. House of Representatives from Illinois's 10th congressional district 1903-1913	Succeeded by Charles M. Thomson
Preceded by Charles M. Thomson	Member of the U.S. House of Representatives from Illinois's 10th congressional district 1915-1919	Succeeded by Carl R. Chindblom
