= John Marshall Hamilton =

American politician

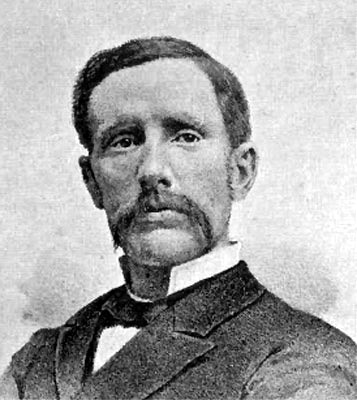

18th Governor of Illinois
- In office February 16, 1883 – January 30, 1885
- Lieutenant: William Campbell
- Preceded by: Shelby Moore Cullom
- Succeeded by: Richard J. Oglesby

22nd Lieutenant Governor of Illinois
- In office January 10, 1881 – February 6, 1883
- Governor: Shelby Moore Cullom
- Preceded by: Andrew Shuman
- Succeeded by: William J. Campbell

Member of the Illinois Senate from the 28th district
- In office 1876 – 1880
- Preceded by: John Cusey
- Succeeded by: Joseph W. Fifer

Personal details
- Born: May 28, 1847 Union County, Ohio
- Died: September 22, 1905 (aged 58) Chicago, Illinois
- Party: Republican

John Marshall Hamilton (May 28, 1847 – September 22, 1905) was the 18th governor of Illinois, serving from 1883 to 1885. Born in Union County, Ohio, Hamilton became interested in politics at a young age, joining the Wide Awakes when he was thirteen and the Union Army four years later. After graduating from Ohio Wesleyan University he studied law and was admitted to the bar. A notable attorney in Bloomington, Illinois, Hamilton was elected to the Illinois Senate in 1876. He served there until 1881, when he was elected Lieutenant Governor of Illinois on a ticket with Shelby Moore Cullom. When Cullom resigned after election to the United States Senate, Hamilton became Governor of Illinois. He was not selected as a candidate for re-election, but did serve that year as a delegate to the 1884 Republican National Convention. He spent the rest of his life as an attorney in Chicago, where he died in 1905.

== Biography ==
Hamilton was born in Union County, Ohio, near Richwood on May 28, 1847. He moved with his family to Roberts Township, Marshall County, Illinois, when he was seven years old. Hamilton first became involved with politics at a young age, joining the Republican Wide Awakes in 1861 at the age of thirteen. Hamilton's unit was called into action as the 77th Illinois Volunteer Infantry Regiment, but Hamilton could not serve because of his young age. Hamilton studied at a school in Henry in the meantime. In 1864, when Hamilton was seventeen years old, he enlisted in the 141st Illinois Volunteer Infantry Regiment during the U.S. Civil War.

After his unit was mustered out, he attended Ohio Wesleyan University. He became a teacher in Henry, but was forced to resign after only a year due to poor health. While recovering, Hamilton studied law in his free time. Seeking a place to study law, he turned to Bloomington, Illinois. Hamilton took a temporary position as Professor of Latin at Illinois Wesleyan University. While there, Hamilton studied law with Weldon, Tipton & Benjamin and was admitted to the bar in 1870. He married Helen Williams in 1871. Hamilton served for several years as an attorney in Bloomington in a practice with J. H. Rowell until he was elected to the Illinois Senate as a Republican in 1876.

Hamilton was elected Lieutenant Governor of Illinois in 1881, serving under Shelby Moore Cullom. At the time, the Lieutenant Governor was also the President of the Illinois Senate. In 1882, Cullom was elected to the United States Senate and vacated his position as Governor of Illinois the following year. Hamilton became the 18th Governor of the state. His brief governorship is best known for the decision requiring compulsory education for Illinois children. Hamilton also signed the Harper High License Law that mandated a license for institutions serving liquor. In 1883, Hamilton sent the Illinois National Guard to quell protests at mines in Madison and St. Clair Counties.

In 1884, Hamilton was selected as a candidate for reelection at the Republican State Convention in Peoria, Illinois. However, the delegation settled on Richard J. Oglesby, who was later elected to serve a third non-consecutive term. Despite this, Hamilton was unanimously elected by the convention as one of the four state delegates to the 1884 Republican National Convention. He first supported former U.S. Senator from Illinois John A. Logan as a presidential candidate, voting for him in the first three ballots. However, after Logan sent a telegram to the convention declining the nomination, Hamilton supported incumbent President Chester A. Arthur. After James G. Blaine was selected as the presidential candidate, Hamilton successfully rallied support for Logan as the vice presidential candidate. The ticket later lost to Grover Cleveland.

Hamilton spent the rest of his life as a lawyer in Chicago. He died there on September 22, 1905, and was buried in Oak Woods Cemetery. His 1872 house in Bloomington, Illinois, was recognized with a listing on the National Register of Historic Places on September 6, 1978.

== Citations ==
Party political offices
Preceded by Andrew Shuman	Republican nominee for Lieutenant Governor of Illinois; 1880	Succeeded by John C. Smith
Political offices
Preceded by Andrew Shuman	Lieutenant Governor of Illinois; 1881-1883	Succeeded by William J. Campbell
Preceded by Shelby Moore Cullom	Governor of Illinois; 1883–1885	Succeeded by Richard J. Oglesby
