= Illinois Treasurer =

Elected official

Treasurer of Illinois
- Seal of Illinois

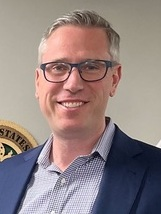
- Incumbent; Mike Frerichs since January 12, 2015
- Style: Mister or Madam Treasurer (informal); The Honorable (formal)
- Member of: State Board of Investment
- Seat: Illinois State Capitol; Springfield, Illinois
- Appointer: General election
- Term length: Four years, no term limits
- Inaugural holder: John Thomas
- Formation: October 2, 1818; 207 years ago
- Succession: Fifth
- Salary: $135,669 (2016)
- Website: Official page

The Treasurer of Illinois is a constitutional officer in the executive branch of government of the U.S. state of Illinois. Seventy-four individuals have occupied the office of Treasurer since statehood. The incumbent is Mike Frerichs, a Democrat. A former Champaign County auditor and state senator, Frerichs was first elected to lead the state treasury in 2014 following a close race with Republican candidate Tom Cross.

== Eligibility and term of office ==
The Treasurer is elected for a renewable four-year term during the quadrennial mid-term election. The Illinois Constitution provides that the Treasurer must, at the time of their election, be a United States citizen, at least 25 years old, and a resident of the state for at least three years preceding the election.

== Powers and duties ==
The Treasurer is charged by Article V, Section 18 of the Illinois Constitution with the safekeeping and investment of the monies and securities deposited into the state treasury. As such, the Treasurer is not the chief financial officer of Illinois. That role is occupied by a separate elected official, the Comptroller. Rather, the Treasurer functions as the chief banking and investment officer for the state of Illinois. In this capacity, the Treasurer receives payments made to the state, deposits monies with approved depository institutions, accounts for and manages the state's daily fund balances, directs and administers the investment of the state's portfolio of operating and proprietary funds, arbitrages bonds issued by the Governor, services principal and interest payable on state debt, and disburses public monies in redemption of warrants drawn by the Comptroller.

Other programs have been assigned to the Treasurer's office by law. For example, the Treasurer collects estate taxes due the state, approves the encumbrance of federal funds, offers various impact investment programs to farmers, small businesses and undercapitalized communities, and administers both escheats and unclaimed property accruing to the state. The Treasurer also facilitates tax-advantaged ABLE, college savings, and retirement savings programs to Illinoisans and provides a voluntary local government investment pool to Illinois' 9,600 or so counties, cities, villages, towns, school districts, and other localities. In addition to these routine functions, the Treasurer is concurrently an ex officio member of the State Board of Investment (ISBI), an independent state agency that oversees the investment of Illinois' public pension funds. ISBI's assets under management totaled $31.5 billion at the close of the 2024 fiscal year.

Aside from functional responsibilities, the Treasurer is constitutionally fifth (behind the Lieutenant Governor, Attorney General, Secretary of State, and Comptroller, respectively) in the line of succession to the office of Governor of Illinois.

== List of office holders ==
#	Image	Name	Political Party	Term
1		John Thomas	Democratic-Republican	1818–1819
2		R. K. McLaughlin	Democratic-Republican	1819–1823
3		Abner Field	Democratic-Republican	1823–1827
4		James Hall	Democratic	1827–1831
5		John Dement	Democratic	1831–1836
6		Charles Gregory	Democratic	1836–1837
7		John D. Whiteside	Democratic	1837–1841
8		Milton Carpenter	Democratic	1841–1848
9		John Moore	Democratic	1848–1857
10		James Miller	Republican	1857–1859
11		William Butler	Republican	1859–1863
12		Alexander Starne	Democratic	1863–1865
13		James H. Beveridge	Republican	1865–1867
14		George W. Smith	Republican	1867–1869
15		Erastus N. Bates	Republican	1869–1873
16		Edward Rutz	Republican	1873–1875
17		Thomas S. Ridgway	Republican	1875–1877
18		Edward Rutz	Republican	1877–1879
19		John C. Smith	Republican	1879–1881
20		Edward Rutz	Republican	1881–1883
21		John C. Smith	Republican	1883–1885
22		Jacob Gross	Republican	1885–1887
23		John Riley Tanner	Republican	1887–1889
24		Charles Becker	Republican	1889–1891
25		Edward S. Wilson	Democratic	1891–1893
26		Rufus N. Ramsay	Democratic	1893–1894
27		Elijah P. Ramsay	Democratic	1894–1895
28		Henry Wulff	Republican	1895–1897
29		Henry L. Hertz	Republican	1897–1899
30		Floyd K. Whittemore	Republican	1899–1901
31		Moses O. Williamson	Republican	1901–1903
32		Fred A. Busse	Republican	1903–1905
33		Len Small	Republican	1905–1907
34		John F. Smulski	Republican	1907–1909
35		Andrew Russel	Republican	1909–1911
36		Edward E. Mitchell	Republican	1911–1913
37		William Ryan Jr.	Democratic	1913–1915
38		Andrew Russel	Republican	1915–1917
39		Len Small	Republican	1917–1919
40		Fred E. Sterling	Republican	1919–1921
41		Edward E. Miller	Republican	1921–1923
42		Oscar Nelson	Republican	1923–1925
43		Omer N. Custer	Republican	1925–1927
44		Garrett D. Kinney	Republican	1927–1929
45		Omer N. Custer	Republican	1929–1931
46		Edward J. Barrett	Democratic	1931–1933
47		John C. Martin	Democratic	1933–1935
48		John Henry Stelle	Democratic	1935–1937
49		John C. Martin	Democratic	1937–1939
50		Louie E. Lewis	Democratic	1939–1941
51		Warren Wright	Republican	1941–1943
52		William G. Stratton	Republican	1943–1945
53		Conrad F. Becker	Republican	1945–1947
54		Richard Yates Rowe	Republican	1947–1949
55		Ora Smith	Democratic	1949–1951
56		William G. Stratton	Republican	1951–1953
57		Elmer Hoffman	Republican	1953–1955
58		Warren Wright	Republican	1955–1957
59		Elmer Hoffman	Republican	1957–1959
60		Joseph D. Lohman	Democratic	1959–1961
61		Francis S. Lorenz	Democratic	1961–1963
62		William J. Scott	Republican	1963–1967
63		Adlai Stevenson III	Democratic	1967–1970
64		Charles W. Woodford	Democratic	1970–1971
65		Alan J. Dixon	Democratic	1971–1977
66		Donald R. Smith	Republican	1977–1979
67		Jerome Cosentino	Democratic	1979–1983
68		James Donnewald	Democratic	1983–1987
69		Jerome Cosentino	Democratic	1987–1991
70		Pat Quinn	Democratic	1991–1995
71		Judy Baar Topinka	Republican	1995–2007
72		Alexi Giannoulias	Democratic	2007–2011
73		Dan Rutherford	Republican	2011–2015
74		Mike Frerichs	Democratic	2015–present

== Proposals to merge with Comptroller ==
Some observers have perceived an overlap between the offices of Treasurer of Illinois and Comptroller of Illinois, and have therefore proposed constitutional amendments to merge the two offices and earn administrative savings. For example, HJRCA 14, considered by the Illinois General Assembly in 2007-2008, would have merged the two offices into the office of a single State Fiscal Officer.

In 2011, the incumbent Treasurer along with the Comptroller (also former Treasurer) Judy Baar Topinka introduced legislation to allow voters to decide whether the offices should be merged. The legislation was opposed by Michael Madigan, Speaker of the Illinois House of Representatives.
