= Charles Becker (politician) =

German-American politician (1840–1908)

Charles Becker (June 24, 1840 – January 2, 1908) was a German American politician from Bavaria. Immigrating to Illinois with his family in 1851, Becker attended public schools and then worked for the Harrison Machine Works. He fought in the Civil War, losing his leg at the Battle of Pea Ridge. He returned to Belleville and became a prominent citizen, holding several local offices before he was elected Illinois Treasurer (1889–1891).

== Biography ==
Charles Becker was born in Rockenhausen, Bavaria, on June 24, 1840. In 1851, his family immigrated to the United States, settling in Belleville, Illinois. Becker attended public school, then found employment with the Harrison Machine Works when he was fifteen. He became a skilled molder and worked there until the outbreak of the Civil War in 1861. Becker enlisted in Company B of the 12th Missouri Volunteer Infantry. At the Battle of Pea Ridge on March 8, 1862, Becker was wounded in the right thigh. The leg was amputated and Becker was discharged from service.

Returning to Belleville, Becker attended school for a while and then returned to the Harrison Machine Works as an officer. Becker was noted for his efficient management and in 1866, he was elected Collector of Taxes and Sheriff of St. Clair County, serving for two years. When his term expired, he ran a brewery with Mr. Echardt for four years. In 1872, he was elected Circuit Clerk and Recorder of Deeds, serving two four-year terms. In the meantime, he became president of the Belleville Stone Works and the Pump & Skein Works. In 1884, Becker was elected chairman of the county Republican Party. Becker was elected Illinois Treasurer in 1889, serving a two-year term.

Charles Becker married Louisa Fleischbein on January 23, 1864. They had six children, five surviving to adulthood: Bertha, Casimir, Gustave, Arthur, and Ray. He died in Belleville on January 2, 1908, and was buried in Walnut Hill Cemetery.

Party political offices
Preceded by John Riley Tanner	Republican nominee for Illinois Treasurer; 1888	Succeeded by Franz Amberg
Political offices
Preceded by John Riley Tanner	Treasurer of Illinois; 1889–1891	Succeeded by Edward S. Wilson
