= James Simpson Jr. =

American politician and businessman (1905-1960)

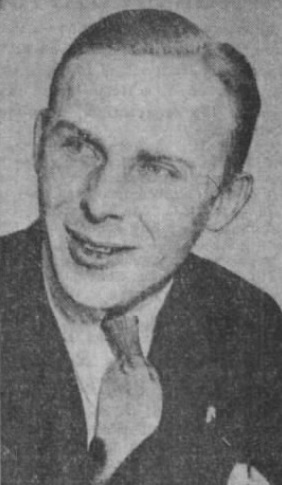
- Chicago Tribune, September 28, 1932

Member of the U.S. House of Representatives from Illinois's 10th district
- In office March 4, 1933 – January 3, 1935
- Preceded by: Carl R. Chindblom
- Succeeded by: Ralph E. Church

Personal details
- Born: January 7, 1905 Chicago, Illinois, US
- Died: February 29, 1960 (aged 55) Wadsworth, Illinois, US
- Resting place: Graceland Cemetery
- Party: Republican
- Spouse: Alicia Patterson (m. 1929; div. 1930)
- Parent: James Simpson Sr. (father)

James C. Simpson Jr. (January 7, 1905 – February 29, 1960) was an American businessman, lawyer and politician who served one term in the United States House of Representatives from 1933 to 1935, representing Illinois.

== Early life and career ==
Simpson was born in Chicago, Illinois on January 7, 1905, the son of prominent businessman James Simpson. He attended St. Paul's School in Concord, New Hampshire from 1919 to 1922, Westminster School, Salisbury, Connecticut from 1922 to 1925, and was later a student at Harvard University. He served as director of Marshall Field & Co. from 1931 to 1960.

== Tenure in Congress ==
At the age of 28, Simpson was elected as a Republican to the 73rd Congress (March 4, 1933 – January 3, 1935). He was defeated in the Republican primary by Ralph Church in 1934.

== Later career ==
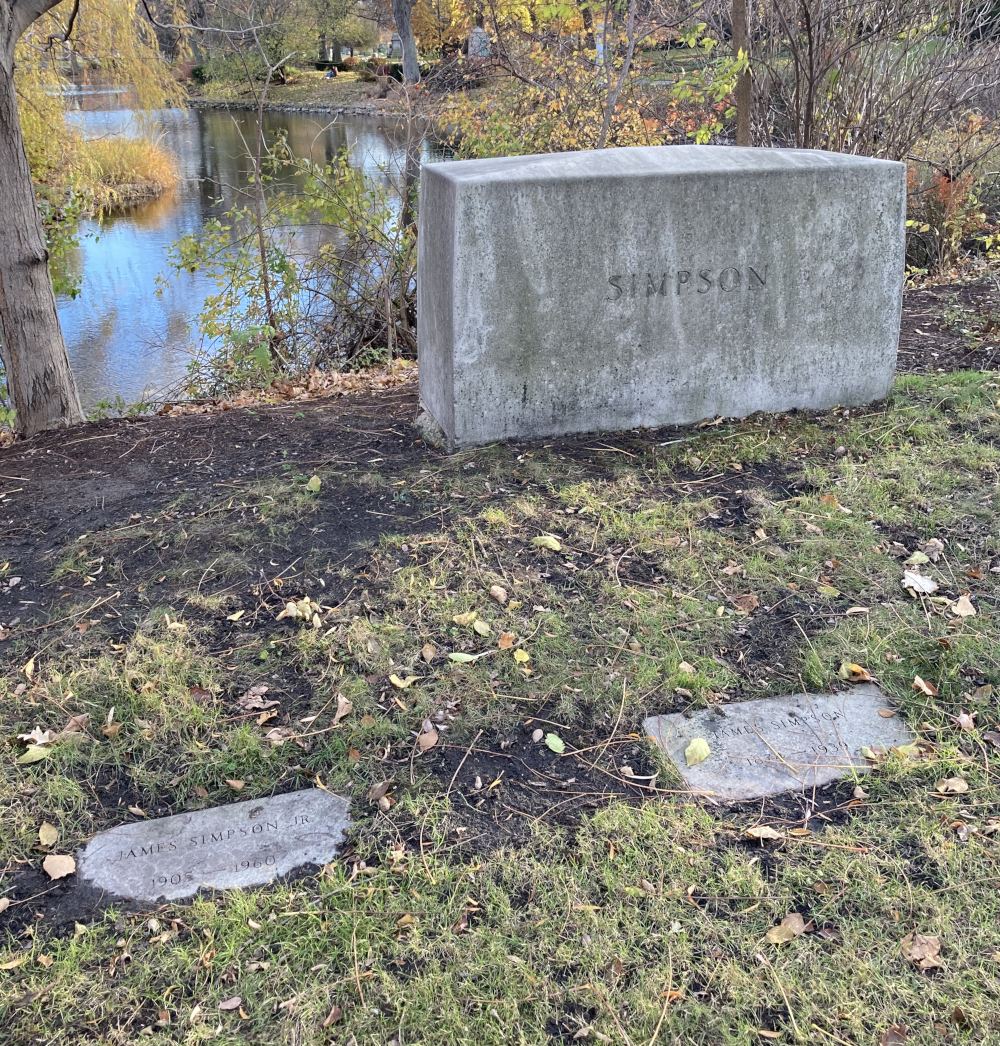
Simpson's grave

He was admitted to the Illinois bar in 1939. He was owner and operator of farms near Wadsworth, Illinois, and Rapidan, Culpeper County, Virginia.

=== World War II ===
He entered the United States Marine Corps in 1943 and served thirty-six months, with twenty-four months in the Pacific area, and was discharged as a captain. He was a civilian aide to Secretary of the Army Robert T. Stevens in 1953 and 1954.

=== Death and burial ===
He died at his farm near Wadsworth, Illinois, February 29, 1960. He was interred in Graceland Cemetery, Chicago.

U.S. House of Representatives
Preceded by Carl R. Chindblom	Member of the U.S. House of Representatives from Illinois's 10th congressional district 1933–1935	Succeeded by Ralph E. Church
