= Peter B. Olsen =

American politician

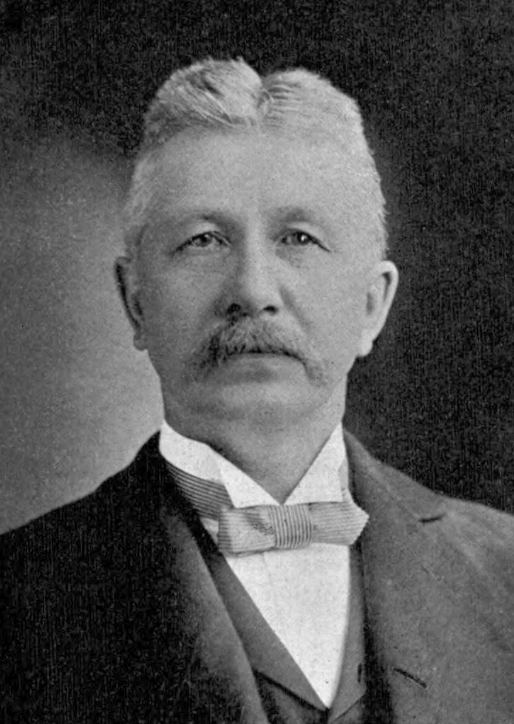

15th Clerk of Cook County
- In office 1900–1906
- Preceded by: Philip Knopf
- Succeeded by: Joseph F. Haas

Member of the Illinois House of Representatives
- In office 1899–1903
- Succeeded by: Philip Knopf

Personal details
- Born: April 11, 1848 Christiana, Norway
- Died: July 3, 1926 (aged 78) Chicago, Illinois, United States
- Party: Republican

Peter B. Olsen (April 11, 1848 – July 3, 1926) was an American newspaper editor and politician.

== Biography ==
Olsen was born in Christiana, Norway on April 11, 1848. He emigrated to the United States in 1872.

He was a printer by trade and became the literary editor for the Skandinaven in Chicago, Illinois.

From 1899 to 1903, he served as a Republican representative in the Illinois House of Representatives. From 1900 to 1906, he served as the Clerk of Cook County, Illinois.

Olsen was a close associate of fellow Chicago politician Henry L. Hertz.

Olsen died at a hospital in Chicago, Illinois on July 3, 1926.

== Related reading ==
- Larson, Laurence M. (1937) Skandinaven, Professor Anderson, and the Yankee School (Northfield, MN: The Changing West and Other Essays, pages 116–146)
- Øverland, Orm (1996) The Western Home - A Literary History of Norwegian America (Northfield, MN: Norwegian-American Historical Association)
