= Floyd K. Whittemore =

American politician and businessman (1844–1907)

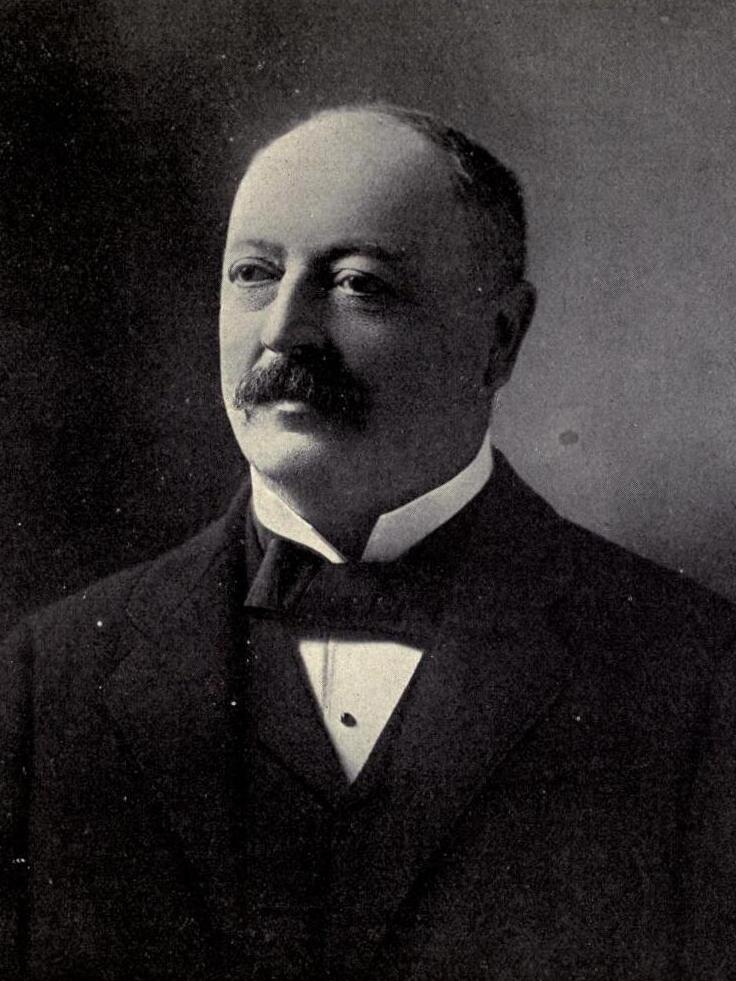
Floyd K. Whittemore

Floyd K. Whittemore (October 2, 1844 – March 4, 1907) was an American politician and businessman.

Born in Auburn, New York, Whittemore and his family moved to Sycamore, Illinois, in 1848. He went to Sycamore public schools. Whittemore worked for the DeKalb County, Illinois, circuit clerk office. He was also a farmer. He worked as the cashier for the State National Bank of Springfield. He was assistant treasurer of the United States at Chicago, Illinois. In 1895, Whittemore was appointed assistant Illinois state treasurer. From 1899 to 1901, Whittemore served as Illinois state treasurer and was a Republican. Whittemore died at his home in Springfield, Illinois.

Party political offices
| Preceded by Henry L. Hertz | Republican nominee for Illinois Treasurer; 1898 | Succeeded by Moses O. Williamson |
Political offices
| Preceded by Henry L. Hertz | Treasurer of Illinois; 1899–1901 | Succeeded by Moses O. Williamson |
