= Carl R. Chindblom =

American politician (1870-1956)

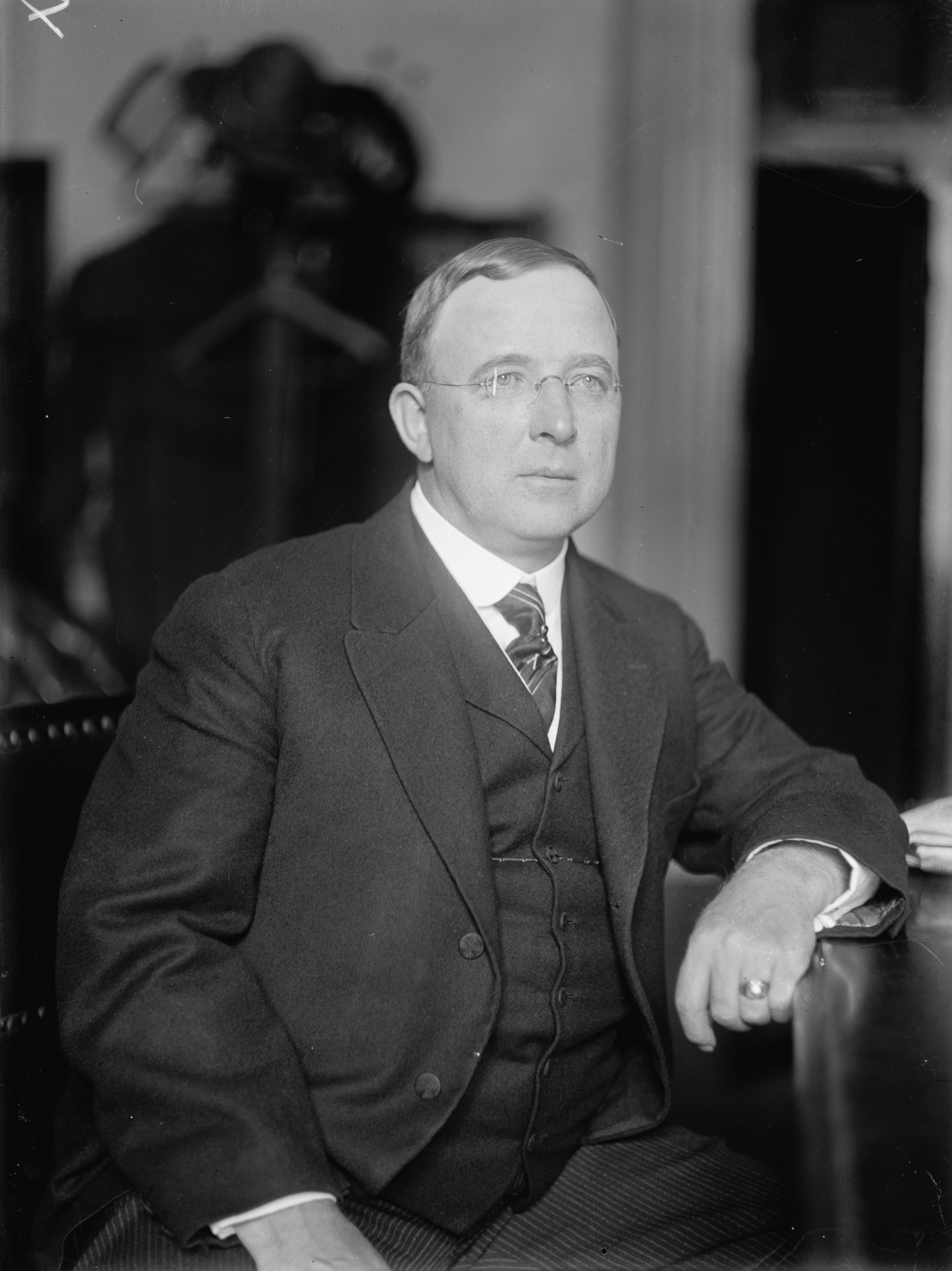

Member of the U.S. House of Representatives from Illinois's 10th district
- In office March 4, 1919 – March 3, 1933
- Preceded by: George Edmund Foss
- Succeeded by: James Simpson Jr.

Member of the Cook County Board of Commissioners
- In office 1906–1910

Personal details
- Born: December 21, 1870 Chicago, Illinois, U.S.
- Died: September 12, 1956 (aged 85) Chicago, Illinois, U.S.
- Party: Republican

Carl Richard Chindblom (December 21, 1870 – September 12, 1956) was a U.S. Representative from Illinois.

== Biography ==
Born in Chicago, Illinois to Swedish immigrant parents, Chindblom attended public schools. He was graduated from Augustana College, Rock Island, Illinois, in 1890 and from the Kent College of Law (Lake Forest University, now part of Chicago-Kent College of Law) at Chicago in 1898. He was a teacher at Martin Luther College in Chicago 1893–1896.

He was admitted to the bar in 1900 and commenced the practice of law in Chicago, Illinois. He served as delegate to the Republican State conventions in 1904, 1908, 1912, and 1916. He was attorney for the Illinois State Board of Health in 1905 and 1906. He served as member of the Cook County Board of Commissioners 1906–1910. He was county attorney of Cook County 1912–1914. He served as master in chancery of the circuit court of Cook County 1916–1918.

Chindblom was elected as a Republican to the Sixty-sixth and to the six succeeding Congresses (March 4, 1919 – March 3, 1933).

He was an unsuccessful candidate for renomination in 1932. He resumed the practice of law in Chicago, Illinois, until his death. He was a referee in bankruptcy in the United States District Court for the Northern District of Illinois, 1934–1942. He died in Chicago, Illinois, September 12, 1956. He was interred in Ridgewood Cemetery, Des Plaines, Illinois.

U.S. House of Representatives
Preceded by George E. Foss	Member of the U.S. House of Representatives from Illinois's 10th congressional district 1919–1933	Succeeded by James Simpson, Jr.
