= Charles M. Thomson =

American politician and judge (1877-1943)

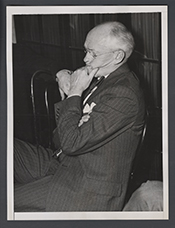

Member of the U.S. House of Representatives from Illinois's 10th district
- In office March 4, 1913 – March 3, 1915
- Preceded by: George Edmund Foss
- Succeeded by: George Edmund Foss

Chicago Alderman from the 25th Ward
- In office 1908–1912 Serving with Winfield P. Dunn (1908–1911) and Henry D. Captain (1911–1912)
- Preceded by: Alfred D. Williston
- Succeeded by: Jacob A. Freund

Personal details
- Born: February 13, 1877 Chicago, Illinois, U.S.
- Died: December 30, 1943 (aged 66) Chicago, Illinois, U.S.
- Party: Progressive

Charles Marsh Thomson (February 13, 1877 – December 30, 1943) was a lawyer, judge and U.S. Representative from Illinois.

== Biography ==
Born in Chicago, Illinois, Thomson attended public schools and the Chicago Manual Training School. He graduated from Washington & Jefferson College, Washington, Pennsylvania, in 1899 and from Northwestern University School of Law, Evanston, Illinois, in 1902. He was admitted to the bar association that year and began practicing law in Chicago.

He served on the Chicago City Council as an alderman from the 25th ward from 1908 through 1912. Thomson was elected to this position in 1908, 1910, and 1912.

He was elected as a Progressive to the 63rd Congress, where he served from March 4, 1913, to March 3, 1915. He was an unsuccessful candidate for reelection to the 64th Congress in 1914.

Thompson was originally going to run for mayor of Chicago in 1915 as a progressive. However, after William Hale Thompson entered the race as a Republican, Charles M. Thomson withdrew. William Hale Thompson was elected, and in turn supported Thomson's subsequent candidacy for the Circuit Court of Cook County later that year.

Thomson was elected a judge of the Circuit Court of Cook County in 1915, and reelected in 1921. He was appointed justice of the Illinois Appellate Court in 1917, and reappointed in 1921. He served in this capacity until June 1927, then resumed his law practice in Chicago.

Thomson at one point was president of the Chicago Bar Association.

He was a trustee of the Chicago and Eastern Illinois Railroad from 1933 to 1939, when he was appointed trustee of the Chicago & North Western Railway. He served as trustee until his death on December 30, 1943. Thomson was interred in Chicago's Rosehill Cemetery.

U.S. House of Representatives
| Preceded by George Edmund Foss | Member of the U.S. House of Representatives from Illinois's 10th congressional district 1913–1915 | Succeeded by George Edmund Foss |
