= Emily Caroline Barnett =

Australian explorer (1860–1944)

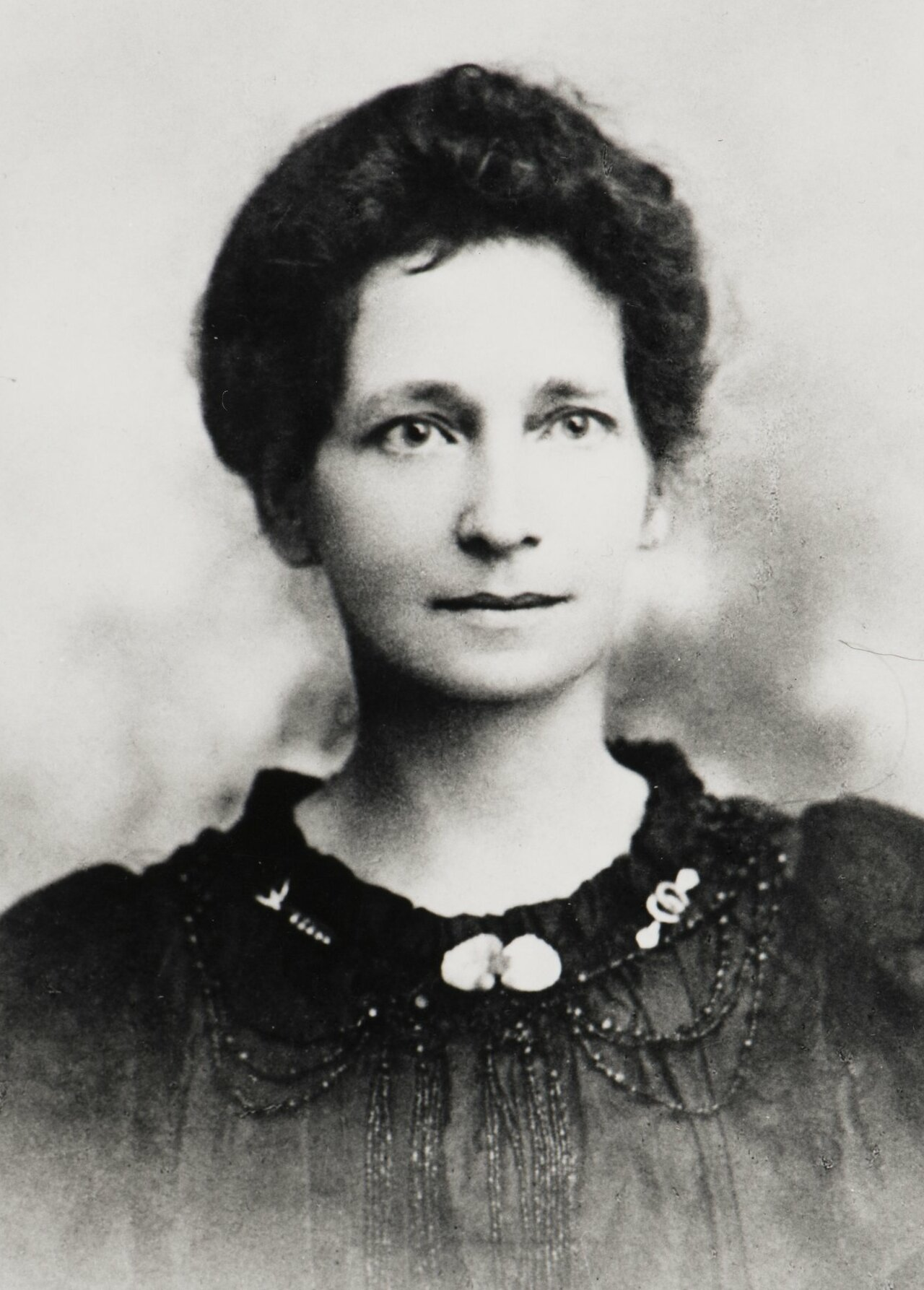
- Born: Emily Caroline Robinson; 1 November 1860; Bay of Bengal
- Died: 1944 (aged 83–84); Sydney
- Other names: Emily Caroline Creaghe
- Known for: exploring
- Spouses: Harry Alington Creaghe; Joseph Jupp Smallman Barnett
- Children: > 7

Emily Caroline Barnett aka Emily Caroline Creaghe born Emily Caroline Robinson (1 November 1860 – 1944) was an Australian explorer around the Gulf of Carpentaria. Her diary records her achievement and the violent relationship between the white settlers and the Indigenous population.

== Life ==
Barnett was born on a ship in the Bay of Bengal. Her mother was Mary Harriett (born Woodward) and her father Captain George Cayley Robinson was in the Royal Artillery. She spent her childhood in England and emigrated to Australia in 1876.

Emily and Harry Alington Creaghe married in December 1881 at St Paul's Anglican Church in Ipswich in Queensland. In 1882 they joined Ernest Favenc and his wife, Elizabeth, on Thursday Island in the Torres Strait. Emily and Harry had travelled by steamship from Sydney to get to Thursday Island. The group intended to explore the Northern Territory and they all travelled by sea to Normanton and landed on 17 January 1883. (Favenc was working in the interests of Leopold Fane De Salis.) The four of them had the target of investigating the land bounded by the McArthur River and the Nicholson River, but their plans changed when Elizabeth Favenc became ill. Ernest took Elizabeth back to Sydney while the remaining men and Emily trekked over 300 km to Carl Creek station arriving at the end of January 1883. They had succeeded, but one of the four men in the party had died from sunstroke. Barnett kept a diary which was recorded in ink and in pencil. It is speculated that the pencil entries may have been made by her husband.

Ernest Favenc returned from Sydney and they were reunited at Gregory Downs station.

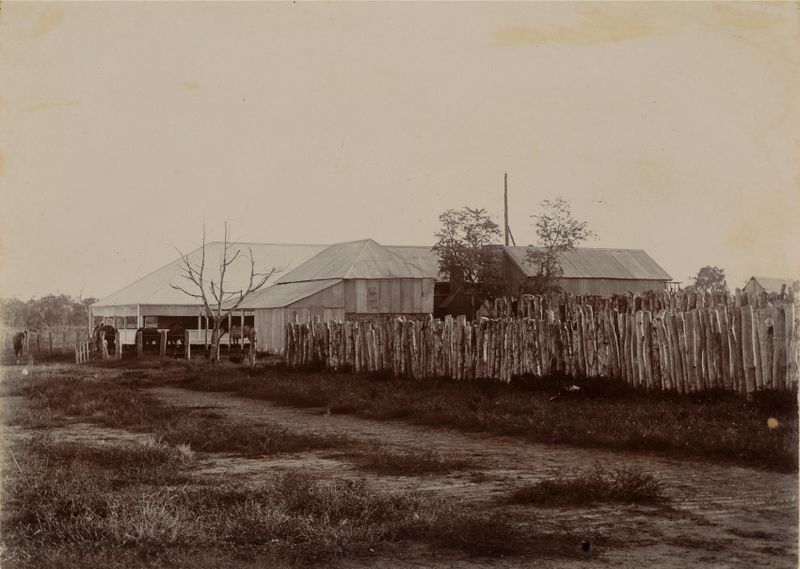
Katherine telegraph station in the early 1890s

They and their horses headed west getting to Powell Creek on 14 May 1883. A telegraph station had been built there in 1875. They had succeeded despite being so short of water that the horses did not drink for two days. No one else was lost and they rested and recovered at the telegraph station. She wrote in her diary about how the Aboriginal population were "not civilised". She noted that they were scared of guns because so many of them had been killed. She wrote that white men could be hanged if they murdered without due cause, so they "keep it quiet". The two of them and the exhausted horses headed north to complete their part of the trek at Katherine telegraph station. Emily, who was now pregnant, and Harry went to Port Darwin accompanied by Alfred and Augusta Giles. She and Harry returned to Sydney, meanwhile Favenc was en route for the Macarthur River.

She published her diary in 1883.

Her husband was killed in an accident in 1886 and she married again at what is now St Paul's Cathedral, Rockhampton on 10 December 1889. Her new husband was Joseph Jupp Smallman Barnett who like her had been brought up in England but who was then the manager of the cattle stations at Apis Creek and Marlborough. Emily Barnett's last great adventure was in 1899 on board the Perthshire. She and her six children were the only passengers apart from their nurse on the refrigerated ship, Perthshire, that was en route to Bluff in New Zealand. Her plan to visit her sister was interrupted when the ship's tail shaft broke 391 miles from Sydney. The Perthshire drifted for 42 days. A temporary repair was made but it was eventually rescued by the Talune who towed it back to Sydney.

== Death and legacy ==
Barnett died in 1944 in Sydney survived by six of her children. Her diary is in the Mitchell Library and it was republished in 2004.
