= Fred A. Busse =

American politician

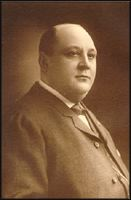

39th Mayor of Chicago
- In office April 15, 1907 – April 17, 1911
- Preceded by: Edward Fitzsimmons Dunne
- Succeeded by: Carter Harrison IV

Postmaster of Chicago
- In office 1905–1907
- Appointed by: Theodore Roosevelt
- Preceded by: Frederick E. Coyne
- Succeeded by: Daniel A. Campbell

Treasurer of Illinois
- In office 1903–1905
- Governor: Richard Yates Jr.
- Preceded by: Moses O. Williamson
- Succeeded by: Len Small

Personal details
- Born: March 3, 1866 Chicago, Illinois
- Died: July 9, 1914 (aged 48) Chicago, Illinois
- Party: Republican
- Spouse: Josephine Lee Busse

Fred A. Busse (March 3, 1866 – July 9, 1914) was the mayor of Chicago, in the U.S. state of Illinois, from 1907 to 1911.

== Biography ==
Early in his career, Busse worked as a bailiff. He was one of the bailiffs in the courtroom of Judge Theodore Brentano during the high-profile murder trial of Patrick Eugene Prendergast (who assassinated Mayor Carter Harrison III).

Busse became a local Republican leader, first elected to the Illinois House of Representatives in 1894 and again in 1896. In 1898, Busse was elected to the Illinois State Senate. He then served as Illinois state treasurer beginning in 1902. In 1905, President Theodore Roosevelt appointed him postmaster of Chicago, a political position at that time (see USPS History). He won the 1907 election for mayor against Democratic incumbent Edward F. Dunne. In business, Busse had been Secretary and Treasurer of the Northwestern Coal Company until 1905.

=== Mayor of Chicago ===
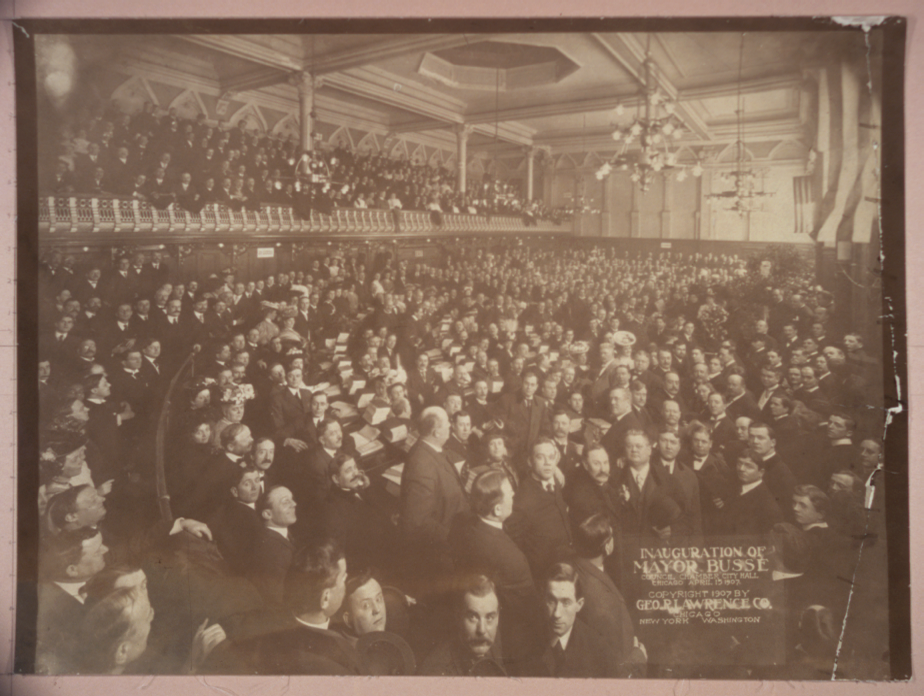
Busse's mayoral inauguration

Busse was elected mayor of Chicago in 1907.

Busse was sworn-in as mayor on April 15, 1907.

Busse's mayoral tenure is noted for its extensive corruption and presence of organized crime in the city. Busse had connections and was a political ally with a number of organized crime figures. Busse's inaction in the face of growing popular concern led to the formation of several organizations opposed to crime and desirous of cleaning up the city government. Busse's image was used by at least one brothel owner to promote her business. While reform, both political and moral, was beginning to appear Chicago, Busse noted, "They don't need anyone sleuthing around after me. They can always get me any evening at J.C. Murphy's saloon, Clark Street and North Avenue." By 1907, pressure was strong enough that Busse was forced to appoint a vice commission, although the commission didn't issue a report until Busse was out of office.

As mayor, Busse was a strong supporter of the Plan of Chicago. He and the City Council established a 328-member Chicago Plan Commission in order to realize the plan.

Busse ultimately lost his bid for reelection in 1911 to Democrat Carter Harrison IV, and was succeeded by Harrison on April 17, 1911.

=== Death ===
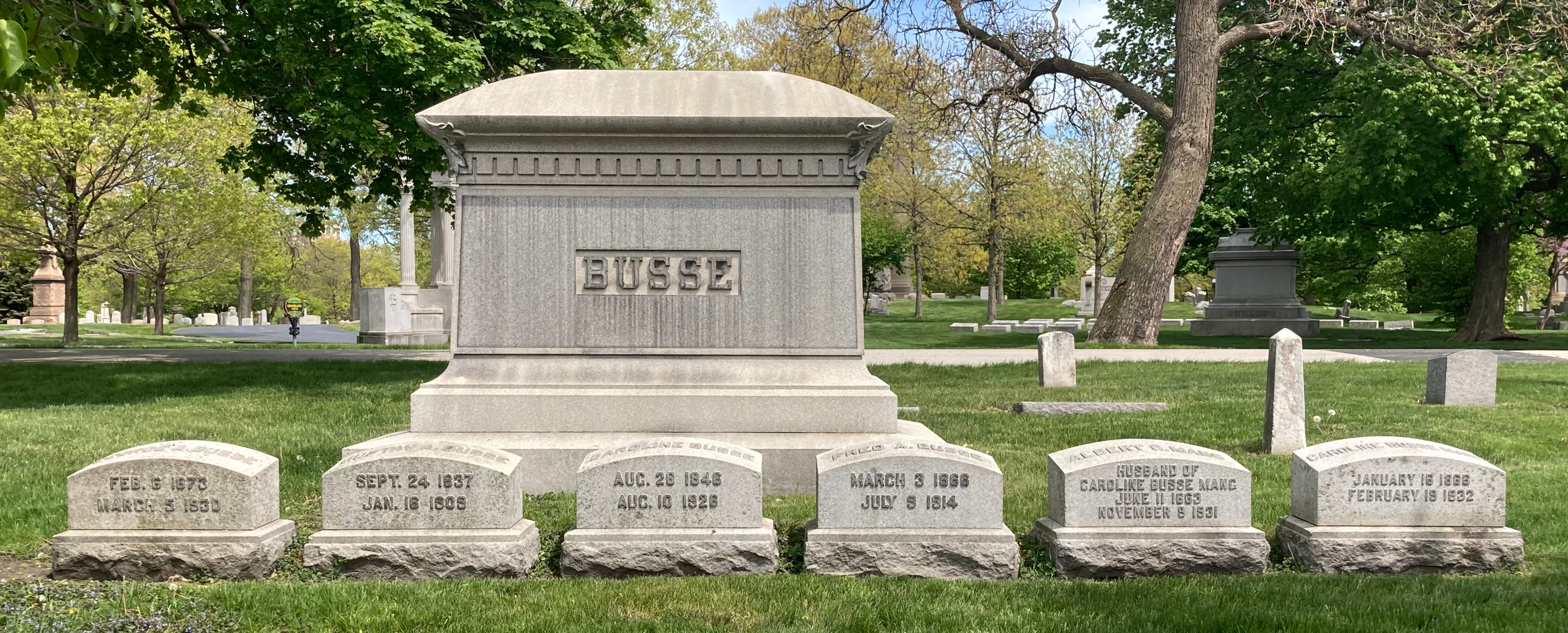
Busse's grave at Graceland Cemetery

He died on July 9, 1914, of valvular heart disease at 48 in Chicago, Illinois. He was buried in Graceland Cemetery.

Party political offices
| Preceded by Moses O. Williamson | Republican nominee for Illinois Treasurer; 1902 | Succeeded by Len Small |
Political offices
| Preceded by Moses O. Williamson | Treasurer of Illinois; 1903–1905 | Succeeded by Len Small |
