= John Riley Tanner =

Governor of Illinois from 1897 to 1901

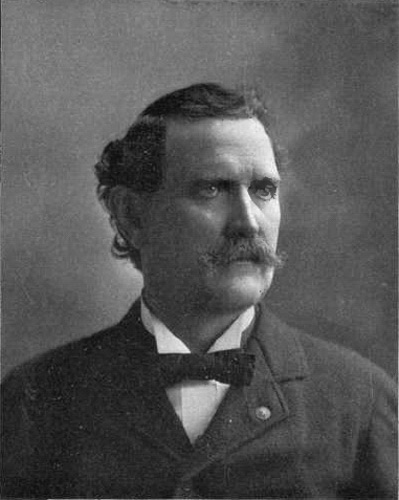
- Tanner circa 1899

21st Governor of Illinois
- In office January 11, 1897 – January 14, 1901
- Lieutenant: William A. Northcott
- Preceded by: John Peter Altgeld
- Succeeded by: Richard Yates Jr.

Treasurer of Illinois
- In office 1887–1889
- Governor: Richard J. Oglesby
- Preceded by: Jacob Gross
- Succeeded by: Charles Becker

Member of the Illinois Senate

Member of the U.S. House of Representatives from 's 44th district
- In office 1880-1883

Personal details
- Born: April 4, 1844 near Boonville, Indiana, U.S.
- Died: May 23, 1901 (aged 57) Springfield, Illinois, U.S.
- Party: Republican
- Spouses: Lauretta Ingraham (m. 1870; died 1887) Cora English (m. 1886–1901)
- Children: Lucinda J., James Mack
- Occupation: Farmer; Politician
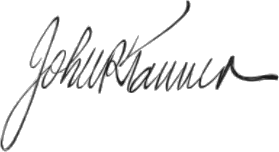
- Signature

John Riley Tanner (April 4, 1844 – May 23, 1901) was the 21st governor of Illinois, from 1897 until 1901.

Tanner was the first governor in the country to be openly neutral in labor disputes, gaining national notoriety for his actions in a series of coal mine disputes. With the Spanish–American War looming, he was the only governor to raise and combat-equip a National Guard unit of African American soldiers led by African American officers.

Tanner's administration was capable and efficient, placing the state on a sound financial footing and passing significant legislation. However, he was constantly at odds with Chicago's political leaders, both Democratic and Republican, a feud that came to be symbolized by his signing of the infamous "Allen bill", which gave control of Chicago's intra-city transportation network to corrupt financier Charles Yerkes.

Tanner declined to seek a second term as governor, instead choosing to oppose the renomination of his former political ally, Shelby Cullom, as U.S. Senator. Tanner was badly defeated within his own party, ending his political career. He died less than five months after leaving office.

== Early life ==
John Riley Tanner was born on a farm near the town of Boonville in Warrick County, Indiana. His family moved to Illinois when he was a child, and he grew up on a farm near Carbondale. He enlisted in the 98th Illinois Infantry at the age of 19, during the Civil War, and saw service with Sherman's army. When the 98th Infantry was mustered out of service in June 1865, Tanner was transferred to the 61st Illinois Infantry, and was mustered out of service later that year. He then returned to southern Illinois and settled in Louisville, Illinois, where he farmed and entered into a partnership with his brother in a milling and lumber business. He married Lauretta Ingraham on Christmas Day 1866 and they had two children, Lucinda J. and J. Mack Tanner, but Lauretta died on October 22, 1887, at the age of 40.

== Political rise ==
Tanner would rise through Republican party ranks to become the unrivaled boss of a powerful political machine. In 1870 he began his long and successful political career in the Illinois Republican party of that era, winning elections and garnering appointments to increasingly important positions. He was first elected to the office of sheriff of Clay County, Illinois (1870–72), and afterwards became circuit court clerk for the county (1872–76). He was appointed master in chancery (i.e., a senior officer of the court) of the circuit court (1877–80), and then served two terms in the Illinois State Senate from the 44th district (1880–1883). Tanner was appointed United States marshal of the Southern District of Illinois by Republican President Chester A. Arthur, but was soon removed by incoming Democratic President Grover Cleveland.

Now prominent in statewide Illinois politics, Tanner was elected State Treasurer in 1886, and in 1891 he was appointed to the State Railroad and Warehouse Commission. In 1892 he was made Assistant Treasurer of the United States Treasury at Chicago, and was elected chairman of the Illinois State Republican Central Committee in 1894, a committee on which he had previously served as a member (1874–84).

As chairman, Tanner was at the head of his party in its heyday of state power and national influence, the boss of a well-oiled political machine that he had helped build. As such, he was instrumental in resuscitating the flagging political fortunes of U.S. Senator Shelby Moore Cullom within his own Republican party.

Tanner was a tireless worker and strong-willed party boss. Under his leadership during the 1896 political campaign, the entire Illinois Republican Party state ticket was elected, the party secured majorities in both branches of the state legislature, and eighteen of their twenty-two candidates for congressmen were elected. Tanner himself was elected governor, defeating incumbent John Peter Altgeld by a wide margin.

== Administration ==
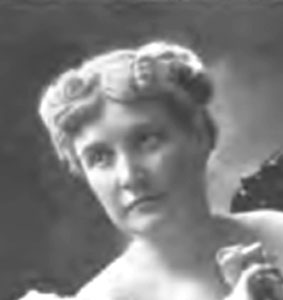
Cora English Tanner, wife of the governor

Tanner led up to his inauguration in grand style with his marriage to the socially prominent Cora English on December 30, 1896. She was known for her interest in social reform and her outspoken support of her ideals, views that were shared by her husband.

John Tanner's administration was noteworthy in several respects. He placed the state on a sound financial footing, and significant legislation included the establishment of the State Board of Pardons, the State Board of Examiners of Architects, the offices of the State Food Commissioners and the State Commissioners of Game, and the Juvenile Court Act. Western Normal School was established at Macomb (originally a school for teachers, now Western Illinois University).

Tanner was also known for his antagonistic relationship with Chicago, and was often at loggerheads with its political bosses, both Democratic and Republican. The mutual hostility came to be symbolized by the "Allen bill", a legislation signed by Tanner which gave control of Chicago's intra-city transportation system to corrupt financier Charles Yerkes. Faced with long-term constraints that would virtually cripple many efforts to develop the city, Chicago was galvanized into instituting internal reforms and ensuring the bill's repeal.

Tanner was an active and unbiased patriot. When the Spanish–American War was declared, he was the first governor in the country to have the state militia ready to be called up into national service. Within 36 hours of President McKinley's call for volunteers, ten thousand equipped troops were ready for muster into the U.S. military.

Among Illinois' contributions were the 8th Illinois Volunteers, an African American regiment with African American officers and an African American commander; and when the President tried to dissuade him from recruiting African Americans, Tanner used his considerable influence to pressure the national government into calling up the regiment and sending them to Cuba, one of ten equipped Illinois regiments to be called up.

Tanner achieved national notoriety with his position on labor disputes at a time when they were characteristically numerous and violent, particularly in the Illinois coalfields. His position was non-partisanship, the first governor to make it a state policy. When violence broke out, he was quick to send state troops to quell the violence, and he was adamantly opposed to the importation of armed men by either side, using troops to enforce state laws against it. The most notable incidents of the day were at Virden (where imported armed men had fired on Illinois strikers), at Pana (racial strife between white and black coal miners, with the governor siding against the position of the white miners), and Carterville (where unarmed African Americans were shot by white miners, an incident vehemently condemned by the governor).

== Legacy ==
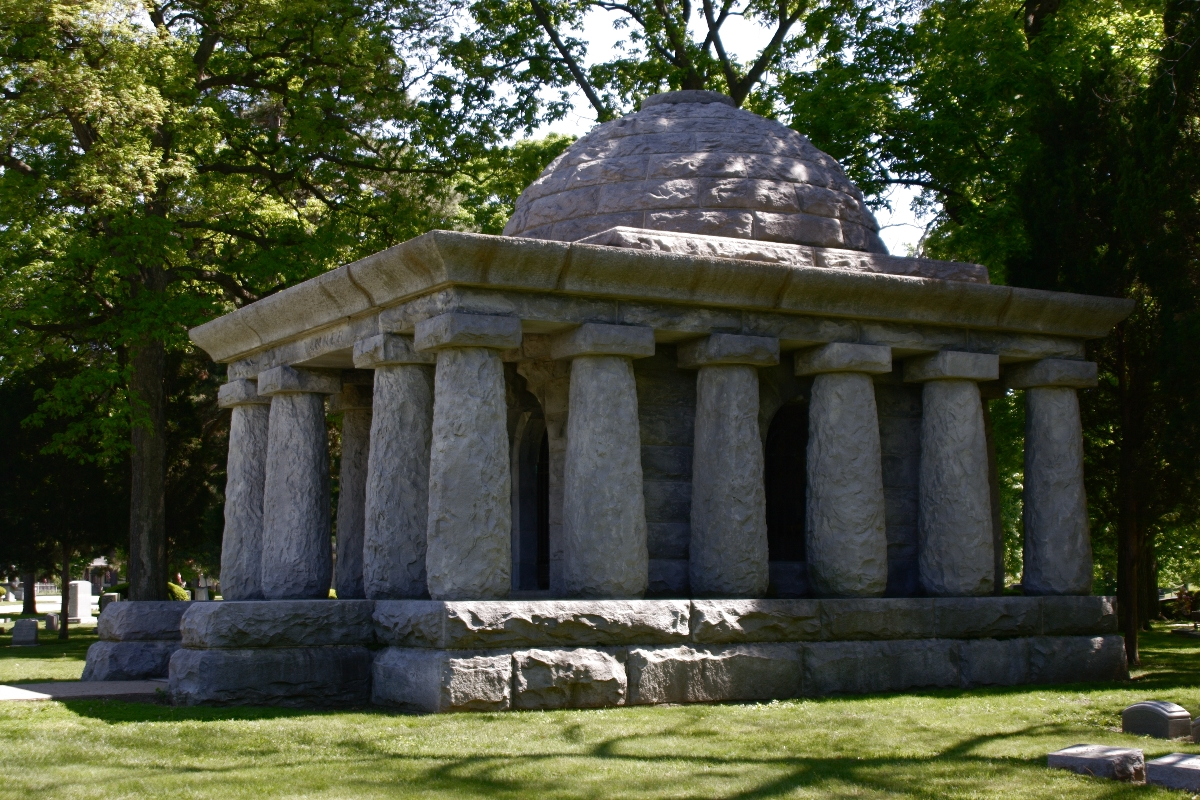
John Tanner's tomb at Oak Ridge Cemetery

Tanner's early and untimely death meant that he would never be able to mend the ill feelings that resulted from his disputes within his own party, particularly those that arose from his challenge to Shelby Cullom immediately preceding his death. His relationship with Chicago politicians had been consistently antagonistic over the years, and they felt no inclination to remember him kindly.

He had personally opposed the use of violence against both companies and laborers in labor disputes, and had favored the elevation of African Americans from an inferior social position to one of equality. As neither principle was actively supported by successful politicians of either party, either before or after his term as governor, it is fair to attribute the principles to him personally, and to note that he was out-of-step with his nineteenth century contemporaries.

Tanner is affectionately remembered both by Organized Labor, and by the African Americans who benefited from his policies. Their donations in remembrance of him accounts for the grand tomb that was erected at his grave.

== Quotes by and about Tanner ==
=== Workers' rights ===
This is the first time in the history of the State or of the nation that the military power of the law, during an industrial contest, has been exercised in defense of the rights of American labor.

— on Tanner's use of the state militia at Virden

Again, those who attempted to take the place of the locked-out miners did not move of their own volition, but came as an army, some of them in cattle cars, and all under the protection of Winchesters in the possession of men disqualified to perform police duty under the laws of this State.

— on Tanner's use of the state militia at Virden

Personally, I believe that employes and laboring men have the same natural and legal right to form combinations for the purpose of maintaining a living wage that employers have to combine in order to keep up the price of their manufactured products and to keep down the price of labor.

— from a speech by Tanner at Trenton, Illinois on November 7, 1898

It appears to me that of all obligations that can be formed, none is so justifiable, or expedient, or sacred, as an agreement in which the employers of labor and their employes unite upon equal terms and have a common interest. That was precisely the character of the agreement reached at Springfield, to which the Virden and Pana mine owners were parties.

— from a speech by Tanner at Trenton, Illinois on November 7, 1898

Who hired these assassins? What right had they to hire them? They were not even citizens of this State, but armed invaders of its soil—fifty or sixty of them, armed with repeating Winchester rifles loaded with powder and ball, invading our State for the purpose of shooting—and they did shoot down—our citizens.

— from a speech by Tanner at Trenton, Illinois on November 7, 1898

The A. F. of L. expresses its heartfelt thanks to John R. Tanner, governor of Illinois, for the noble stand taken and the precedent established by him for the cause of organized labor.

— American Federation of Labor, 1919

=== Racial attitudes ===
To His Excellency, John R. Tanner, the able and fearless executive of the great State of Illinois, who believes and who has the courage of his convictions, that it is the heart, the brain, the soul, not the skin, that go to determine manhood; who, acting on this belief and the fundamental principle of this government that "taxation without representation is tyranny," had the manhood to appoint colored officers to command a Colored Regiment, this book is affectionately dedicated

— History of the Eighth Illinois United States Volunteers, 1899

Even from the very doors of the White House have I received letters asking and advising me not to officer this regiment with colored men, but I promised to do so, and I have done it. I shall never rest until I see this regiment—my regiment—on the soil of Cuba, battling for the right, and for its kinsmen.

— from a speech by Tanner to members of the 8th Illinois, after an all-white regiment had been activated for service in the Spanish–American War, 1899

I am the only Governor in the United States who sent to the field, in response to the call of the President for volunteers, a negro regiment, officered by negroes, with a negro colonel at its head.

— from a speech by Tanner at Trenton, Illinois on November 7, 1898

== Bibliography ==
- Bateman, Newton; Selby, Paul, eds. (1918), "Tanner, John R.", Historical Encyclopedia of Illinois, Chicago: Munsell Publishing Company, p. 518
- Church, Charles A. (1912), History of the Republican Party in Illinois 1854–1912, Rockford: Wilson Brothers Company
- Converse, Henry A. (1915), "The Life and Services of Shelby M. Cullom", Transactions of the Illinois State Historical Society for the Year 1914, Springfield: Illinois State Journal Co., pp. 55–79
- Cullom, Shelby M. (1911), Fifty Years of Public Service, Chicago: A. C. McClurg & Co.
- Fisher, Charles E., ed. (1897), "Editorial: A Fair-Minded Governor", Medical Century, January–December 1897, V, New York: 149
- Jamieson, J. A.; Williams, G. I.; White, H.; Allen, Jack; Graham, John (1919), Complete History of the Colored Soldiers in the World War, New York: Bennett & Churchill, pp. 71–105
- Johnson, Edward A. (1899), History of Negro Soldiers in the Spanish–American War and Other Items of Interest, Raleigh: Edward A. Johnson, ISBN 9781414292601
- McCard, Harry Stanton; Turnley, Henry (1899), History of the Eighth Illinois United States Volunteers, Chicago: E. F. Harman
- Morrison, Frank (Secretary) (1919), "Tanner, John", American Federation of Labor: History, Encyclopedia, Reference Book, Washington, D.C.: American Federation of Labor, p. 369
- Norris, Floyd, "The New York Times Archive, 1851–1980", The New York Times
- Norton, Samuel Wilber (1907), Chicago Traction: A History, Legislative and Political, Chicago
- Ross, David (Secretary) (1899), Seventeenth Annual Report of the State Bureau of Labor Statistics Concerning Coal in Illinois, 1898, Springfield: Phillips Bros.
- Senn, Nicholas (1900), Medico-Surgical Aspects of the Spanish–American War, Chicago: American Medical Association Press
- Shaw, Albert, ed. (1898), "An Industrial War in Illinois", The American Monthly Review of Reviews, July–December 1898, XVIII, New York: The Review of Reviews Company: 512–513
- Sobel, Robert; Raimo, John, eds. (1978), Biographical Directory of the Governors of the United States, 1789–1978, vol. 1, Westport: Meckler Books – quoted in Illinois Governor John Riley Tanner by the National Governors Association
- Suffern, Arthur E. (1915), Conciliation and Arbitration in the Coal Industry of America, Boston: Houghton Mifflin Company
- Sweeney, W. Allison (1919), History of the American Negro in the Great World War
- "Tanner, John Riley", The Encyclopedia Americana, New York: Encyclopedia Americana Corporation, 1920, p. 245
- "Tanner, John Riley", Appletons' Annual Cyclopædia and Register of Important Events of the Year 1901, New York: D. Appleton and Company, 1902, p. 470
- "Tanner, John Riley", The Cyclopedic Review of Current History, vol. II, Boston: Current History Company, 1902, pp. 892–894

Party political offices
Preceded by Jacob Gross	Republican nominee for Illinois Treasurer; 1886	Succeeded by Charles Becker
Preceded by Joseph W. Fifer	Republican nominee for Governor of Illinois; 1896	Succeeded by Richard Yates Jr.
Political offices
Preceded by Jacob Gross	Treasurer of Illinois; 1887–1889	Succeeded by Charles Becker
Preceded by John Peter Altgeld	Governor of Illinois; 1897–1901	Succeeded by Richard Yates, Jr.
