= 1896 Illinois lieutenant gubernatorial election =

- November 3, 1896
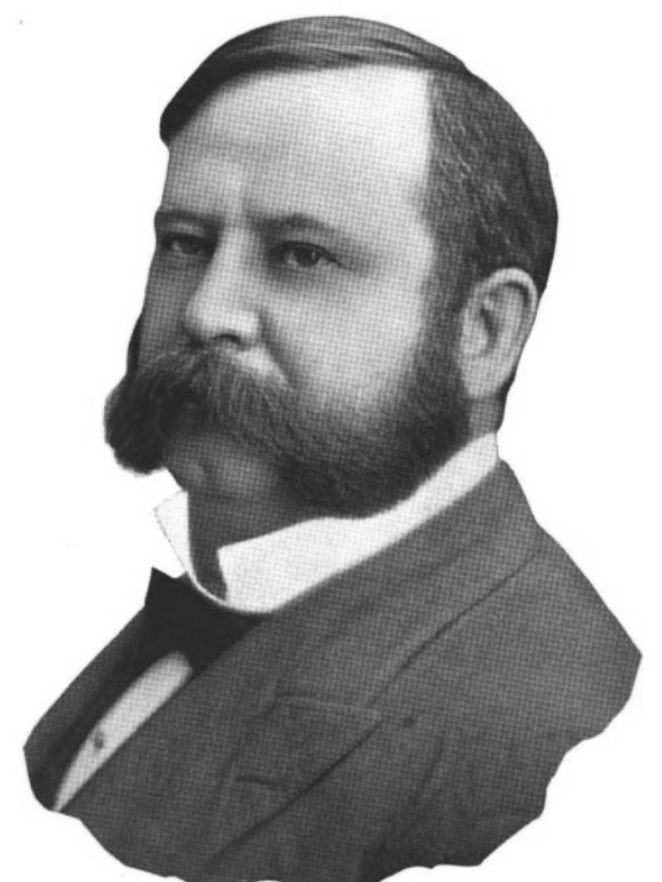

Nominee	William Northcott	Monroe Carroll Crawford
Party	Republican	Democratic
Popular vote	601,829	464,475
Percentage	55.33%	42.70%
Lieutenant Governor before election
Joseph B. Gill
Democratic
Elected Lieutenant Governor
William Northcott
Republican

The 1896 Illinois lieutenant gubernatorial election was held on November 3, 1896, in order to elect the Lieutenant Governor of Illinois. Republican nominee William Northcott defeated Democratic nominee Monroe Carroll Crawford, as well as several other candidates.

== General election ==
On election day, November 3, 1896, Republican nominee William Northcott won the election by a margin of 137,354 votes against his foremost opponent Democratic nominee Monroe Carroll Crawford, thereby gaining Republican control over the office of lieutenant governor. Northcott was sworn in on January 3, 1897.

=== Results ===
Illinois lieutenant gubernatorial election, 1896
Party	Candidate	Votes	%
Republican	William Northcott	601,829	55.33
Democratic	Monroe Carroll Crawford	464,475	42.70
Prohibition	Henry B. Kepley	11,390	1.05
Independent Democrat	Chester A. Babcock	7,158	0.66
Socialist Labor	Charles R. Davis	1,084	0.10
Populist	Henry Demarest Lloyd	1,003	0.09
National	John A. Kirkpatrick	739	0.07
Total votes		1,087,678	100.00
Republican gain from Democratic			

== See also ==
- 1896 Illinois gubernatorial election
