= 1896 Illinois gubernatorial election =

- November 3, 1896
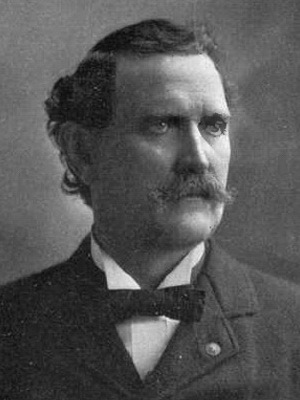

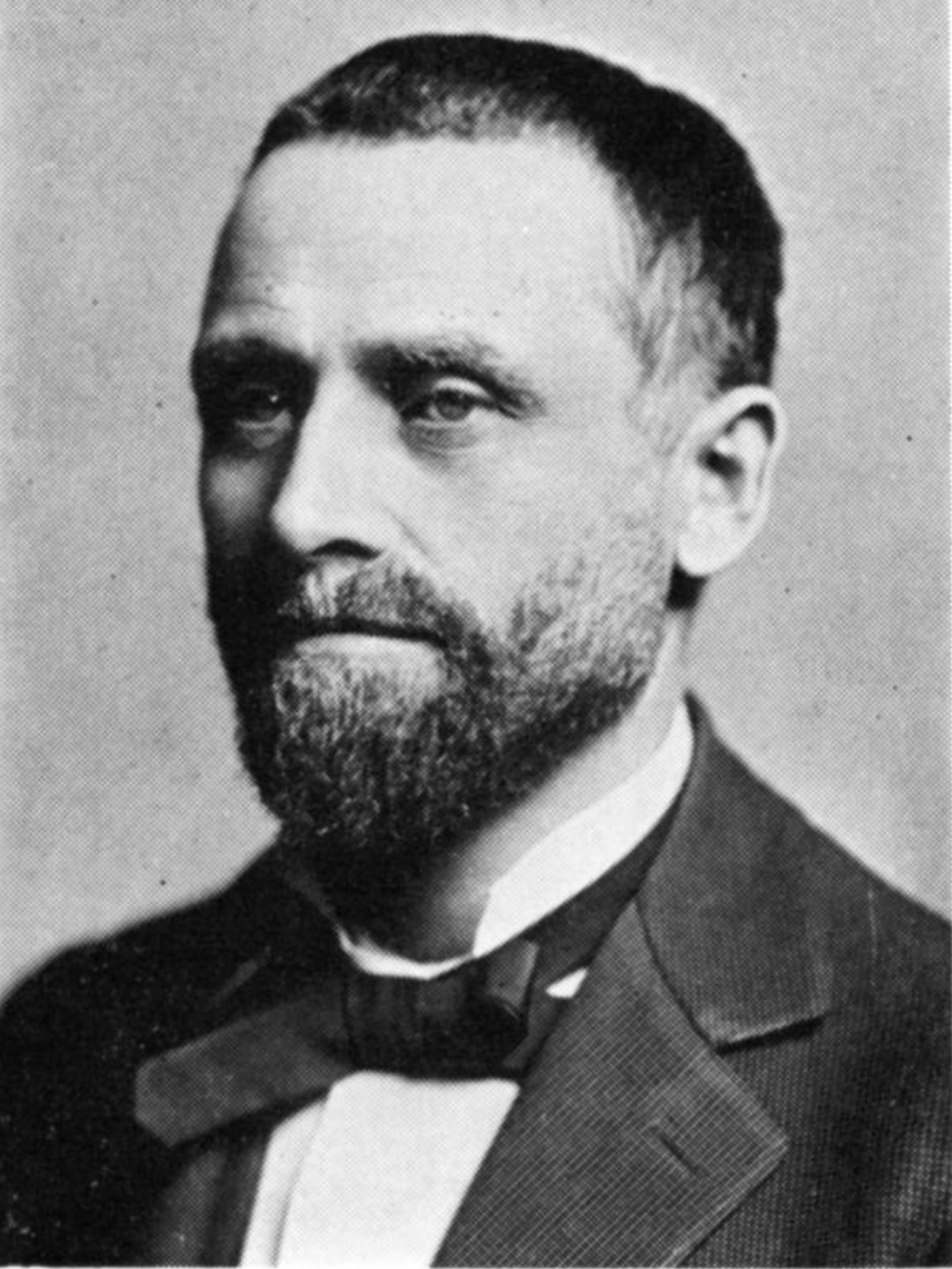
Nominee	John Riley Tanner	John Peter Altgeld
Party	Republican	Democratic
Popular vote	587,637	474,256
Percentage	54.10%	43.66%
- County results Tanner: 40–50% 50–60% 60–70% 70–80% 80–90% Altgeld: 40–50% 50–60% 60–70%
Governor before election
John Peter Altgeld
Democratic
Elected Governor
John Riley Tanner
Republican

The 1896 Illinois gubernatorial election was held on November 3, 1896. Democratic incumbent John Peter Altgeld was defeated by Republican nominee John Riley Tanner, who won 54.10 percent of the vote.

== Democratic nomination ==
=== Candidates ===
- John Peter Altgeld, incumbent governor of Illinois since 1893

=== Results ===
The Democratic state convention was held on June 23, 1896, in Peoria. Altgeld was renominated by acclamation.

Democratic gubernatorial nomination, 1st ballot, 23 June 1896
Party	Candidate	Votes	%
Democratic	John Peter Altgeld (incumbent)	acclaimed	

== Republican nomination ==
=== Candidates ===
- Albert J. Hopkins, U.S. representative from Aurora
- Joseph Robbins, doctor
- John Riley Tanner, former Illinois treasurer and chair of the Illinois Republican Party

=== Results ===
The Republican state convention was held on April 29 and 30, 1896 at Springfield.

Republican gubernatorial nomination, 1st ballot, 29 April 1896 (Note: Some sources give the result as Tanner 1,106, Hopkins 160, Robbins 69 or as Tanner 1,081, Hopkins 185, Robbins 69)
Party	Candidate	Votes	%
Republican	John Riley Tanner	1,083	81.12
Republican	Albert J. Hopkins	183	13.71
Republican	Joseph Robbins	69	5.17
Total votes		1,335	100.00

== General election ==
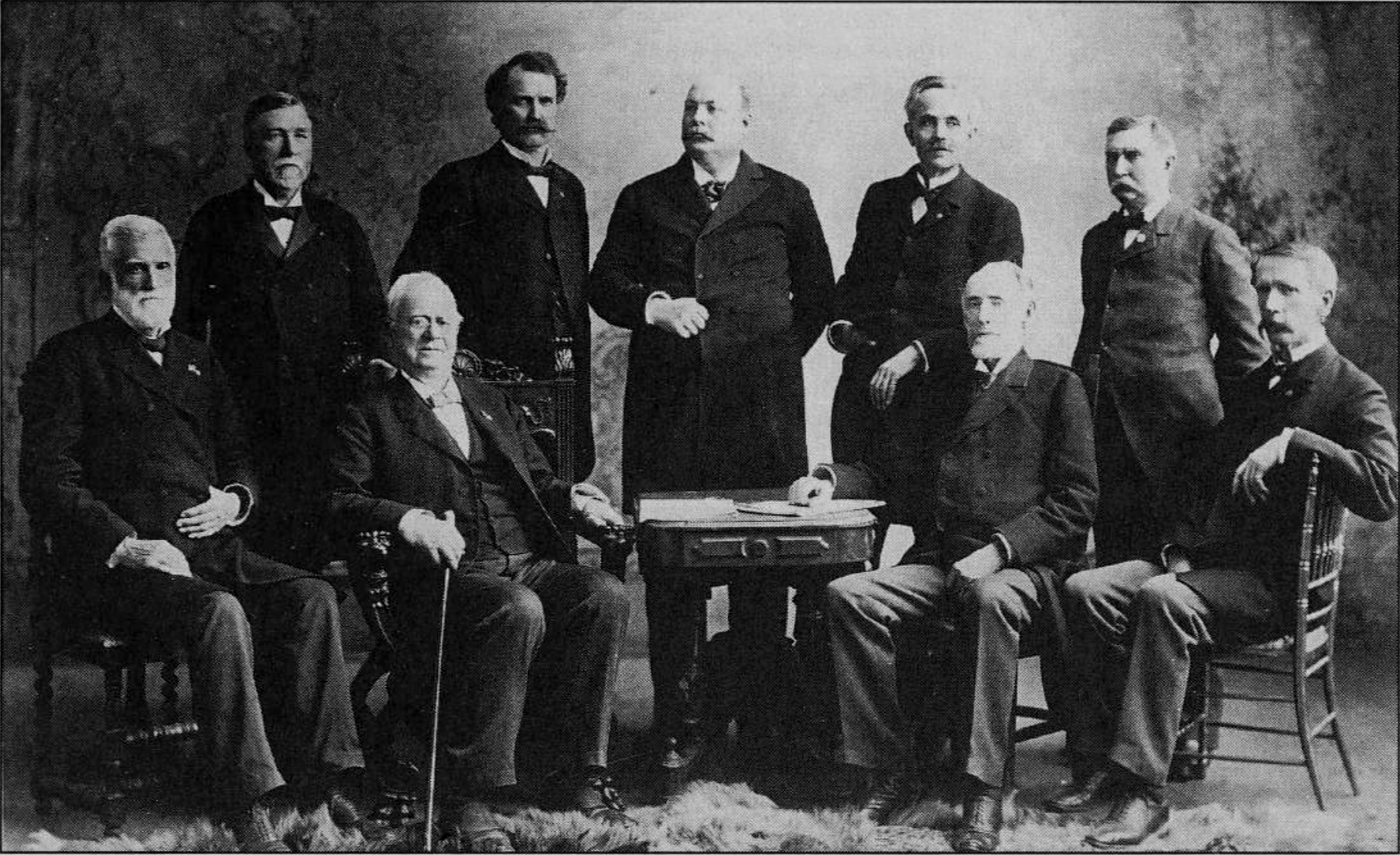
The "Flying Squadron" of Illinois Governors who campaigned for John Tanner. Sitting from left to right is former Governor John L. Beveridge, former Governor Richard J. Oglesby, former Governor Shelby M. Cullom, and former Governor John M. Hamilton. Standing from left to right is former Lieutenant Governor John C. Smith, Republican gubernatorial nominee and future Governor John R. Tanner, James Van Cleve, former Governor Joseph W. Fifer, and former Lieutenant Governor Lyman B. Ray.

=== Candidates ===
- John Peter Altgeld, incumbent governor of Illinois since 1893 (Democratic)
- Charles A. Baustian (Socialist Labor)
- William S. Forman, former U.S. representative from Nashville (National Democratic)
- George Washington Gere (Prohibition)
- Isaac W. Higgs (National)
- John Riley Tanner, former Illinois treasurer and chair of the Illinois Republican Party (Republican)

=== Results ===
Illinois gubernatorial election, 1896
Party	Candidate	Votes	%	±%
Republican	John Riley Tanner	587,637	54.10%	
Democratic	John Peter Altgeld (incumbent)	474,256	43.66%	
Prohibition	George Washington Gere	14,559	1.34%	
National Democratic	William St. John Forman	8,102	0.75%	
Socialist Labor	Charles A. Baustian	985	0.09%	
National Party	Isaac W. Higgs	723	0.07%	
Scattering		10	0.00%	
Majority		113,381	10.44%	
Turnout		1,086,272	100.00%	
Republican gain from Democratic		Swing		

== See also ==
- 1896 Illinois lieutenant gubernatorial election

== Bibliography ==
- Compiled and Printed by the Secretary of State (1897). Official vote of the State of Illinois cast at the General Election held November 3, 1896. Springfield, Ill.: Phillips Bros., State Printers.
