= 1892 Illinois lieutenant gubernatorial election =

- November 8, 1892
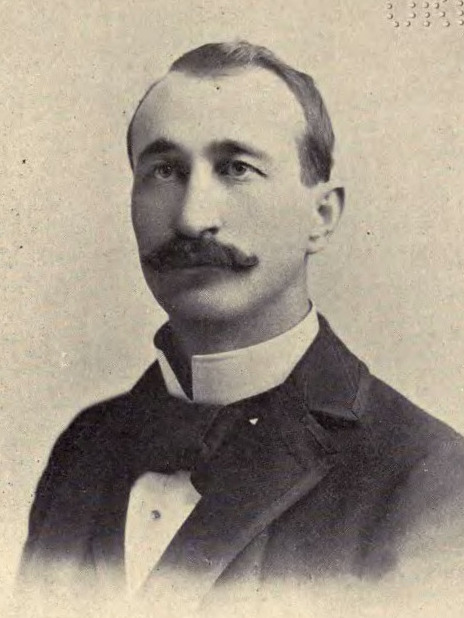

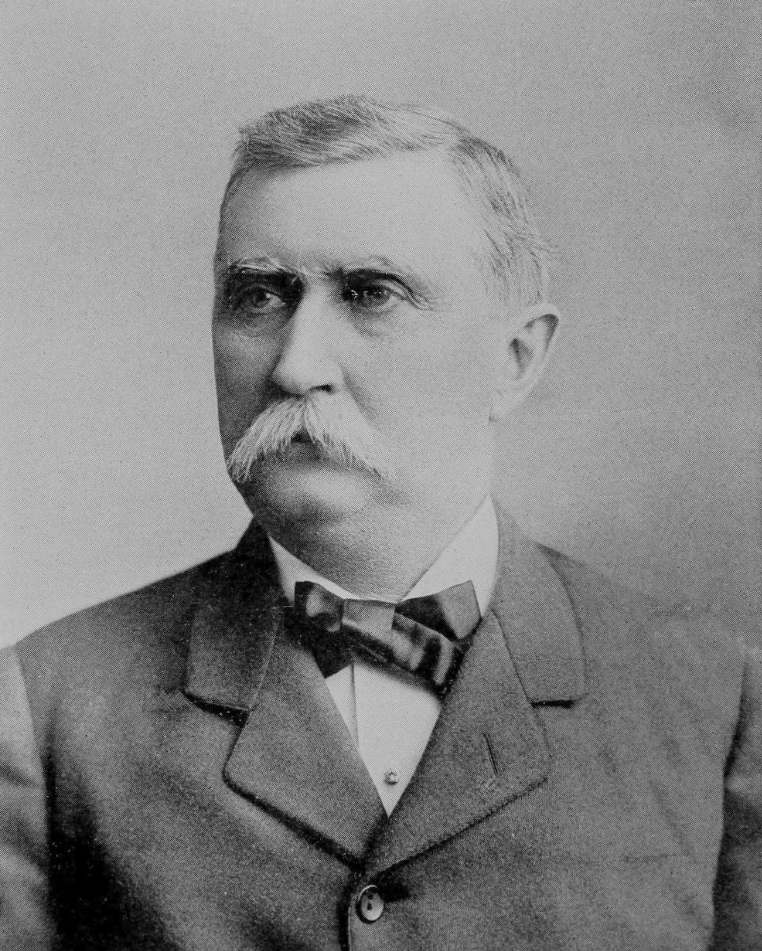
| Nominee | Joseph B. Gill | Lyman Beecher Ray |
| Party | Democratic | Republican |
| Popular vote | 424,707 | 399,957 |
| Percentage | 48.72% | 45.88% |
Lieutenant Governor before election
Lyman Beecher Ray
Republican
Elected Lieutenant Governor
Joseph B. Gill
Democratic

The 1892 Illinois lieutenant gubernatorial election was held on 8 November 1892 in order to elect the Lieutenant Governor of Illinois. Democratic nominee Joseph B. Gill defeated Republican nominee and incumbent Lieutenant Governor Lyman Beecher Ray and other third party candidates.

== Results ==
Illinois lieutenant gubernatorial election, 1892
| Party | Candidate | Votes | % |
|---|---|---|---|
| Democratic | Joseph B. Gill | 424,707 | 48.72 |
| Republican | Lyman Beecher Ray | 399,957 | 45.88 |
| Prohibition | James Lamont | 25,626 | 2.94 |
| People's | Charles G. Dixon | 21,409 | 2.46 |

== See also ==
- 1892 Illinois gubernatorial election
