= 1892 Illinois gubernatorial election =

- November 8, 1892
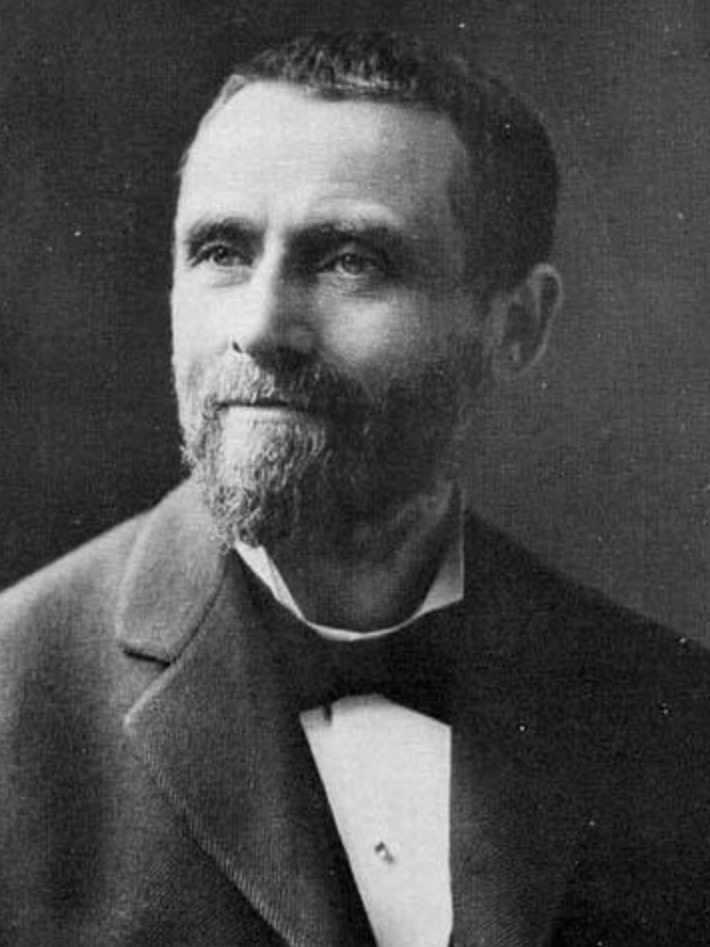

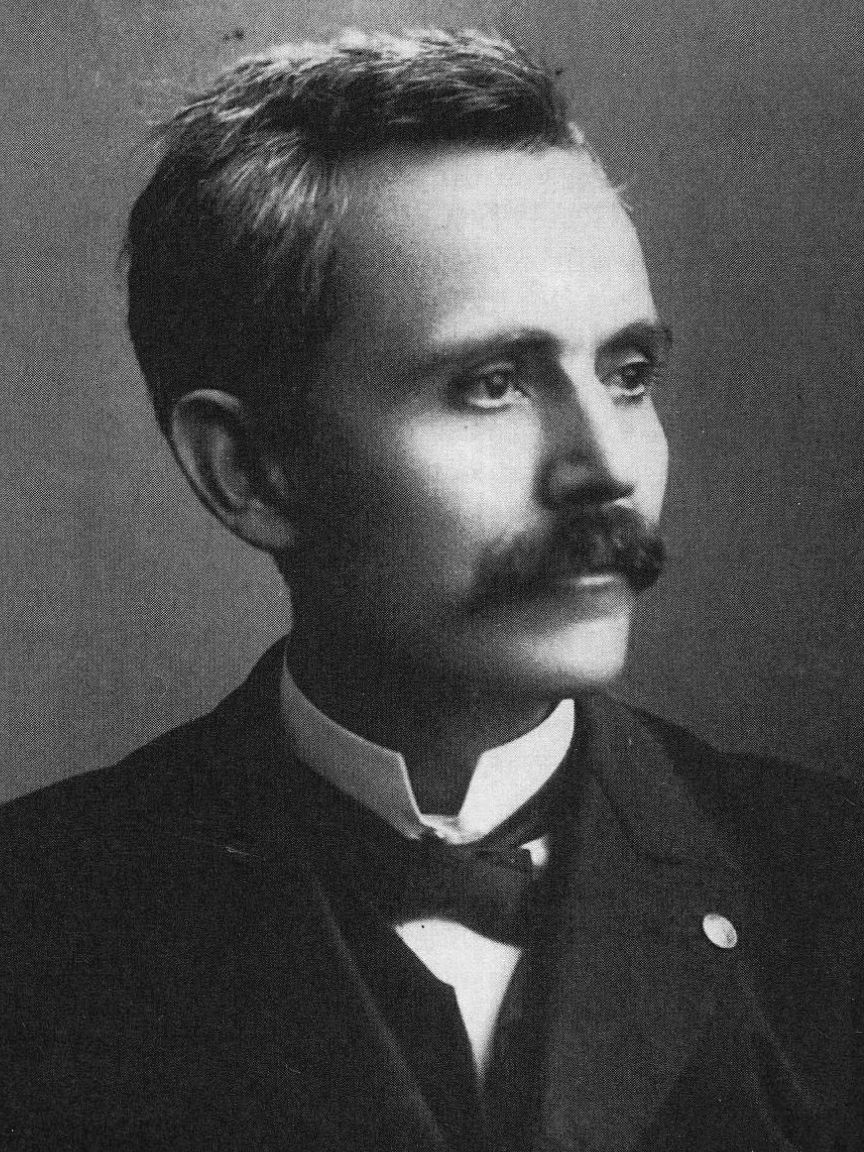
Nominee	John Peter Altgeld	Joseph W. Fifer
Party	Democratic	Republican
Popular vote	425,558	402,676
Percentage	48.74%	46.12%
- County results Altgeld: 40–50% 50–60% 60–70% Fifer: 40–50% 50–60% 60–70% 70–80%
Governor before election
Joseph W. Fifer
Republican
Elected Governor
John Peter Altgeld
Democratic

The 1892 Illinois gubernatorial election was held on November 8, 1892. Republican incumbent Joseph W. Fifer ran for re-election to a second term and was defeated by Democratic nominee John Peter Altgeld, who won 48.74 percent of the vote. Altgeld was the first Democratic governor elected since 1852, before the foundation of the Illinois Republican Party.

== Republican nomination ==
=== Candidates ===
- Horace S. Clark
- Joseph W. Fifer, incumbent governor of Illinois since 1889
- George Hunt, Illinois attorney general
- Joel Minnick Longenecker, Cook County state's attorney
- Benjamin F. Marsh, former U.S. representative from Warsaw

=== Results ===
Sketch of the Republican station convention at which Fifer was re-nominated

The Republican state convention was held on May 4 and 5, 1892 at Springfield.

Republican gubernatorial nomination, 1st ballot, May 4, 1892 (Note: Some sources give Hunt's vote as 31.)
Party	Candidate	Votes	%
Republican	Joseph W. Fifer (incumbent)	941	76.19
Republican	Joel Minnick Longenecker	120	9.72
Republican	Horace S. Clark	93	7.53
Republican	George Hunt	51	4.13
Republican	Benjamin Franklin Marsh	30	2.43
Total votes		1,235	100.00

== Democratic nomination ==
=== Candidates ===
- John Peter Altgeld, former justice of the Superior Court of Cook County
- John C. Black, former U.S. commissioner of pensions
- Andrew Jackson Hunter, judge of the Circuit Court of Edgar County
- William H. Neece, former U.S. representative from Macomb
- Delos P. Phelps, nominee for U.S. representative in 1878

=== Results ===
The Democratic state convention was held on April 27, 1892, at Springfield.

Democratic gubernatorial nomination, 1st ballot, April 27, 1892
Party	Candidate	Votes	%
Democratic	John Peter Altgeld	561	65.31
Democratic	John C. Black	185	21.54
Democratic	Andrew Jackson Hunter	53	6.17
Democratic	William H. Neece	44	5.12
Democratic	Delos P. Phelps	16	1.86
Total votes		859	100.00

== General election ==
=== Candidates ===
- John Peter Altgeld, former justice of the Superior Court of Cook County (Democratic)
- Nathan M. Barnett, Union Labor nominee for Illinois treasurer in 1888 and son of Robert F. Barnett (Populist)
- Joseph W. Fifer, incumbent governor of Illinois since 1889 (Republican)
- Robert R. Link, nominee for Illinois treasurer in 1890 (Prohibition)

=== Results ===
Illinois gubernatorial election, 1892
Party	Candidate	Votes	%	±%
Democratic	John Peter Altgeld	425,558	48.74%	
Republican	Joseph W. Fifer (incumbent)	402,676	46.12%	
Prohibition	Robert R. Link	24,808	2.84%	
Populist	Nathan M. Barnett	20,103	2.30%	
Majority		22,882	2.62%	
Turnout		873,145	100.00%	
Democratic gain from Republican		Swing		

== Bibliography ==
- Compiled and Printed by the Secretary of State (1893). Official vote of the State of Illinois cast at the General Election held November 8, 1892. Springfield, Ill.: H. W. Rokker, State Printer and Binder.
- Louis L. Emmerson, Secretary of State, ed. (1925). "Personal Reminiscenses of Joseph W. Fifer". Blue Book of the State of Illinois 1925-1926. Springfield, Illinois: Illinois State Journal Co. p. 303.

== See also ==
- 1892 Illinois lieutenant gubernatorial election
