= William J. Calhoun =

American politician

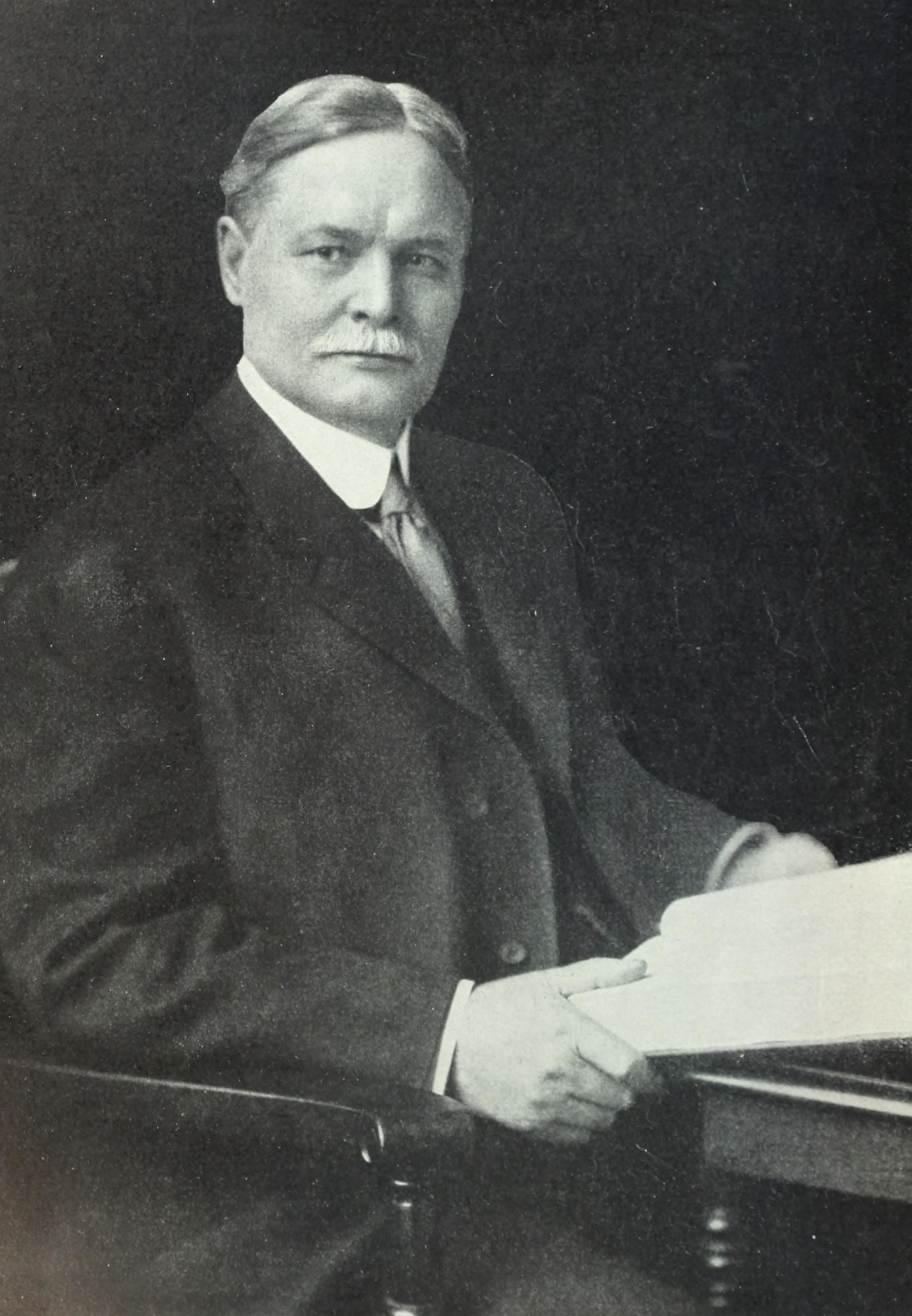
William J. Calhoun

William James Calhoun (October 5, 1848 – September 19, 1916) was an American attorney, government official, and friend of President William McKinley. A noted corporation lawyer, Calhoun wrote a report that helped persuade McKinley to enter the Spanish–American War, served as a commissioner of the Interstate Commerce Commission and later served as a special envoy to China.

== Early life ==
Calhoun was born in Pittsburgh, Pennsylvania, the son of Robert Calhoun and the former Sarah Knox. After attending public school, the boy was sent to the Poland Seminary, where he became great friends with the young William McKinley, also a student there.

The Calhouns moved to Ohio, where William worked on a farm. In 1864, the 16-year-old enlisted in the 19th Ohio Volunteer Infantry. He served there through the end of the war, seeing action in Georgia, and later serving in Tennessee and Texas. He was still under 18 when he was mustered out.

== Early career ==
Calhoun moved to Danville, Illinois, where he obtained a position as a schoolteacher, studying law at night. He was admitted to the Illinois Bar in 1873, and practiced law in Danville until 1898, gaining fame for his brilliance and eloquence as a criminal defense attorney. In 1882, he was elected to the Illinois House of Representatives as a Republican, where he served one term.

== Governmental career ==
In 1897, Calhoun's friend, William McKinley, who had recently been sworn in as President, appointed him as special counsel to US Consul General in Cuba Fitzhugh Lee, to investigate the death of Dr. Ricardo Ruiz, a dentist and naturalized American citizen who died in a Cuban jail after his arrest for sabotage. His report led McKinley to conclude that war against Spain was advisable. On March 9, 1898, McKinley appointed Calhoun as a commissioner of the Interstate Commerce Commission for a six-year term. The Senate confirmed Calhoun's nomination the following day, and he was sworn in on March 21. He resigned on September 30, 1899 and was succeeded by fellow Illinois Republican Joseph W. Fifer.

Calhoun returned to the practice of law, but as a corporation lawyer in Chicago. He represented such corporations as the Baltimore & Ohio Railroad, and served as a director of the Indiana, Illinois and Iowa Railroad. In 1905, President Theodore Roosevelt appointed him to go to Venezuela and resolve the dispute between Venezuelan President Cipriano Castro and foreign powers. Calhoun was successful in this task.

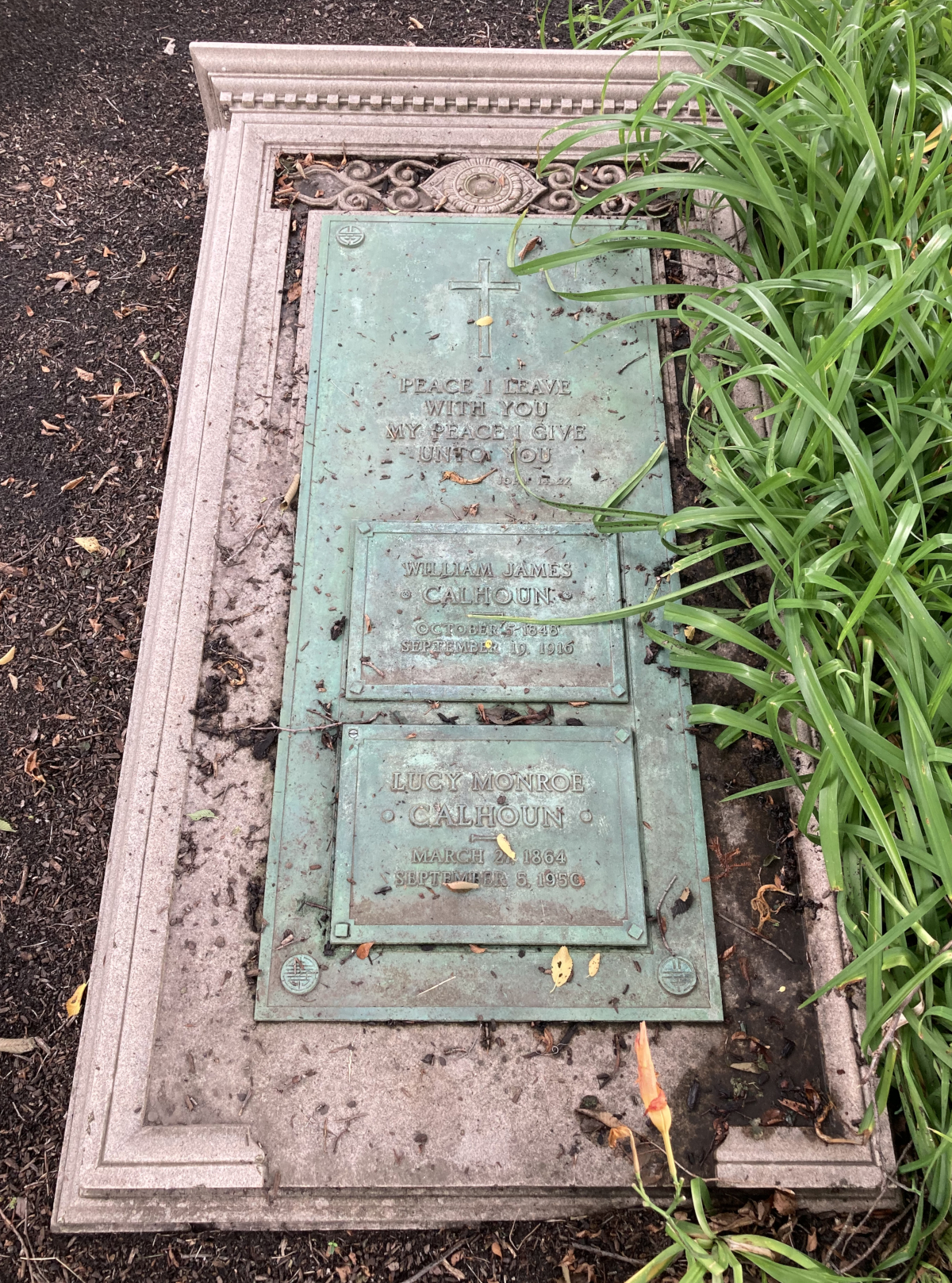
Calhoun's grave at Graceland Cemetery

In 1909, President William Howard Taft appointed Calhoun as Envoy Extraordinary and Minister Plenipotentiary to China. He served there until 1913. Present in China during the Xinhai Revolution, he arranged for President Taft to send Marines to China to protect the legation the following year. In 1913, he resigned, and returned to Chicago, where his knowledge of China made him much in demand as a trade adviser.

In early 1916, Calhoun suffered a paralyzing stroke, and he died at his home in Chicago on September 19, 1916. He was buried at Graceland Cemetery.
