= Michael Waller Robinson =

American politician

Member of the Illinois Senate from the 7th district
- In office 1874 – 1878
- Preceded by: Rollin S. Williamson
- Succeeded by: William J. Campbell

Personal details
- Born: October 13, 1837 Fulton, Missouri
- Died: July 23, 1912 (aged 74) Chicago, Illinois
- Party: Democratic
- Profession: Attorney

Michael Waller Robinson (October 13, 1837 – July 23, 1912) was an American lawyer, educator, and politician from Missouri. Graduating from Yale University at the age of nineteen, Robinson taught at Baptist State College, where he became college president in 1860. He attended Harvard Law School then successfully ran for a seat in the Missouri House of Representatives. After attending the 1864 Democratic National Convention as a delegate, Robinson decided to move to Chicago, Illinois and became a prominent lawyer there. He served two terms in the Illinois Senate in the 1870s.

== Biography ==
Michael Waller Robinson was born in Fulton, Missouri on October 13, 1837. During his youth, he attended school and worked on the family farm. He attended preparatory school at Fulton College and then Georgetown College in Georgetown, Kentucky. He was admitted to Yale University in New Haven, Connecticut. He graduated with honors in 1857 at the age of nineteen.

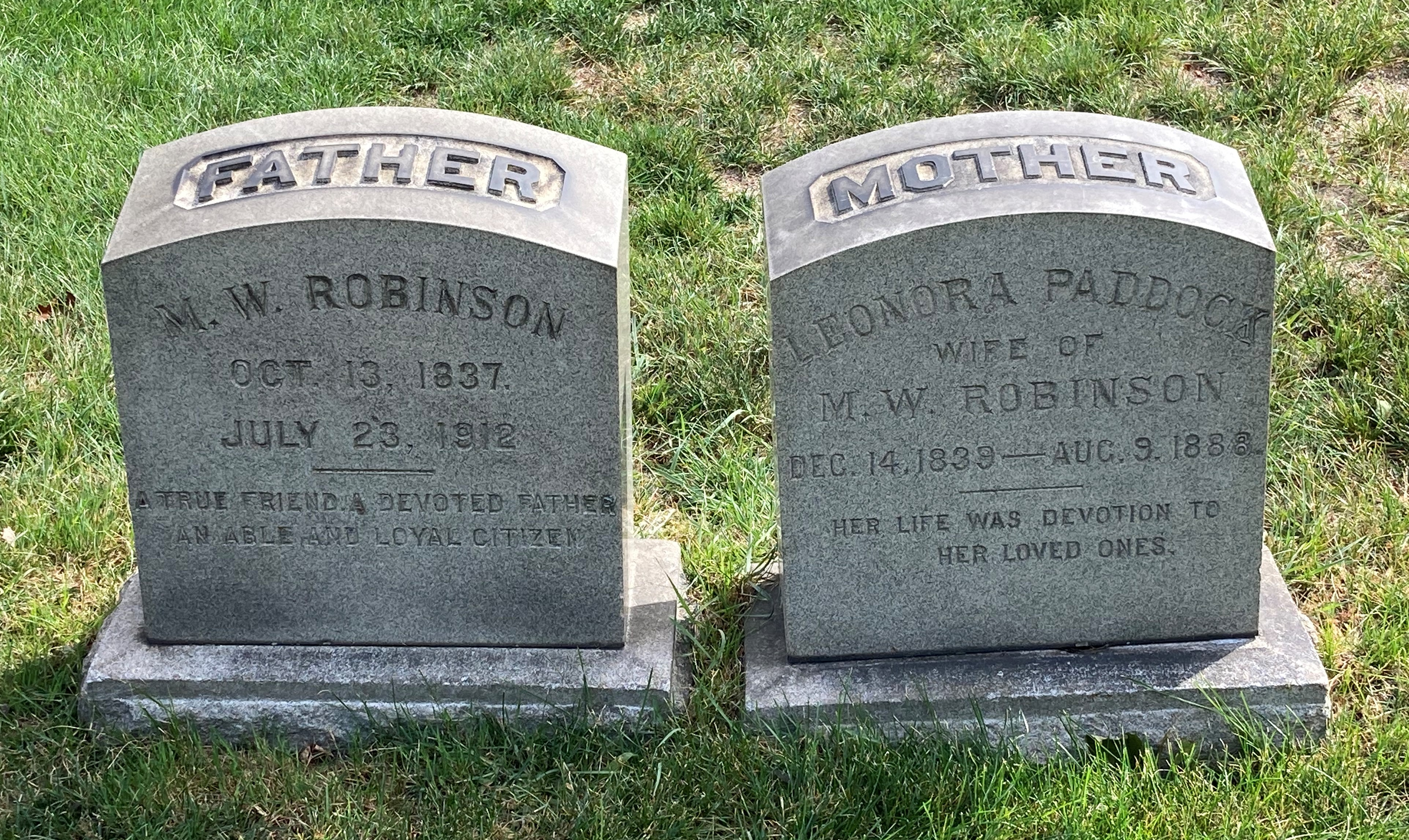
Graves of Robinson and Leonora C. Paddock at Graceland Cemetery

Returning to Missouri, he was appointed Professor of Greek and Latin at Baptist State College in Liberty. He taught for three years, assuming the presidency of the institution during the last year. In his free time, Robinson studied law under Alexander William Doniphan. Robinson matriculated at the Harvard Law School in Cambridge, Massachusetts, graduating in 1861. Robinson again returned to Missouri, now practicing law in Fulton with future Missouri Attorney General John A. Hockaday. In 1862, he was elected to the Missouri House of Representatives for a two-year term. In 1864, during the Civil War, he was arrested and held as a military prisoner for several months.

Upon his release, Robinson was named a delegate to the 1864 Democratic National Convention in Chicago, Illinois. He was impressed with the city and decided to re-locate there. Robinson became a leading lawyer there, partnering at times with Lambert Tree and John V. Le Moyne. He settled in Lake View, Illinois in 1870 and served several terms at town attorney. He was elected to the Illinois Senate in 1874, serving two two-year terms. Robinson was named president of the Democratic State Convention upon expiration of his second term. Upon the annexation of Lake View to Chicago in 1889, Robinson was named assistant counsel to Chicago. He later served as special assessment attorney for the city. In his later years, he focused on real estate investments.

Robinson married Leonora C. Paddock on December 23, 1866. They had four sons and two daughters: Walter B., Harbert B., Harold H. Ethel G. and Florence C. Robinson was a Baptist. He died in Chicago on July 23, 1912, and was buried in Graceland Cemetery.
