= 1900 Illinois lieutenant gubernatorial election =

- November 6, 1900
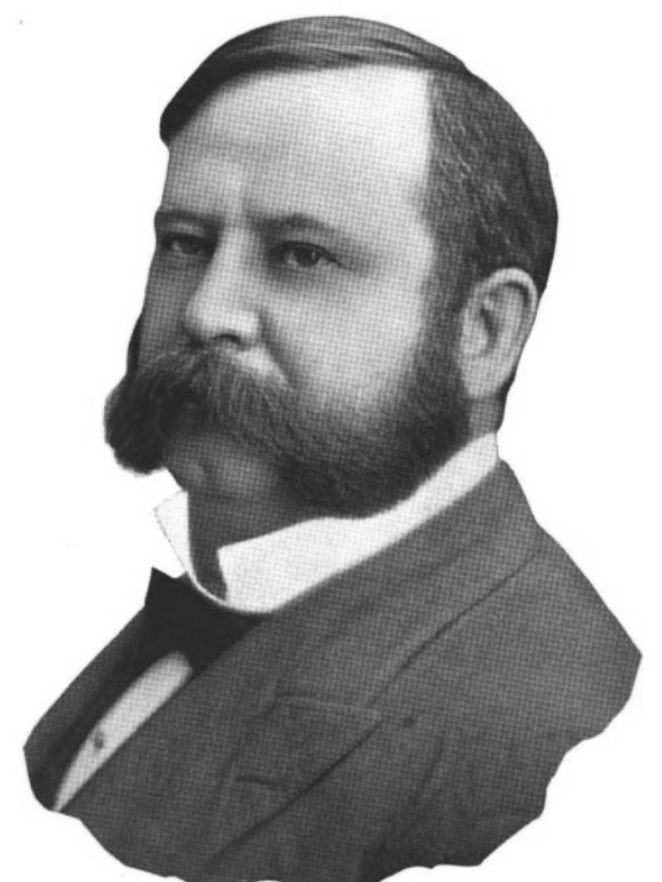

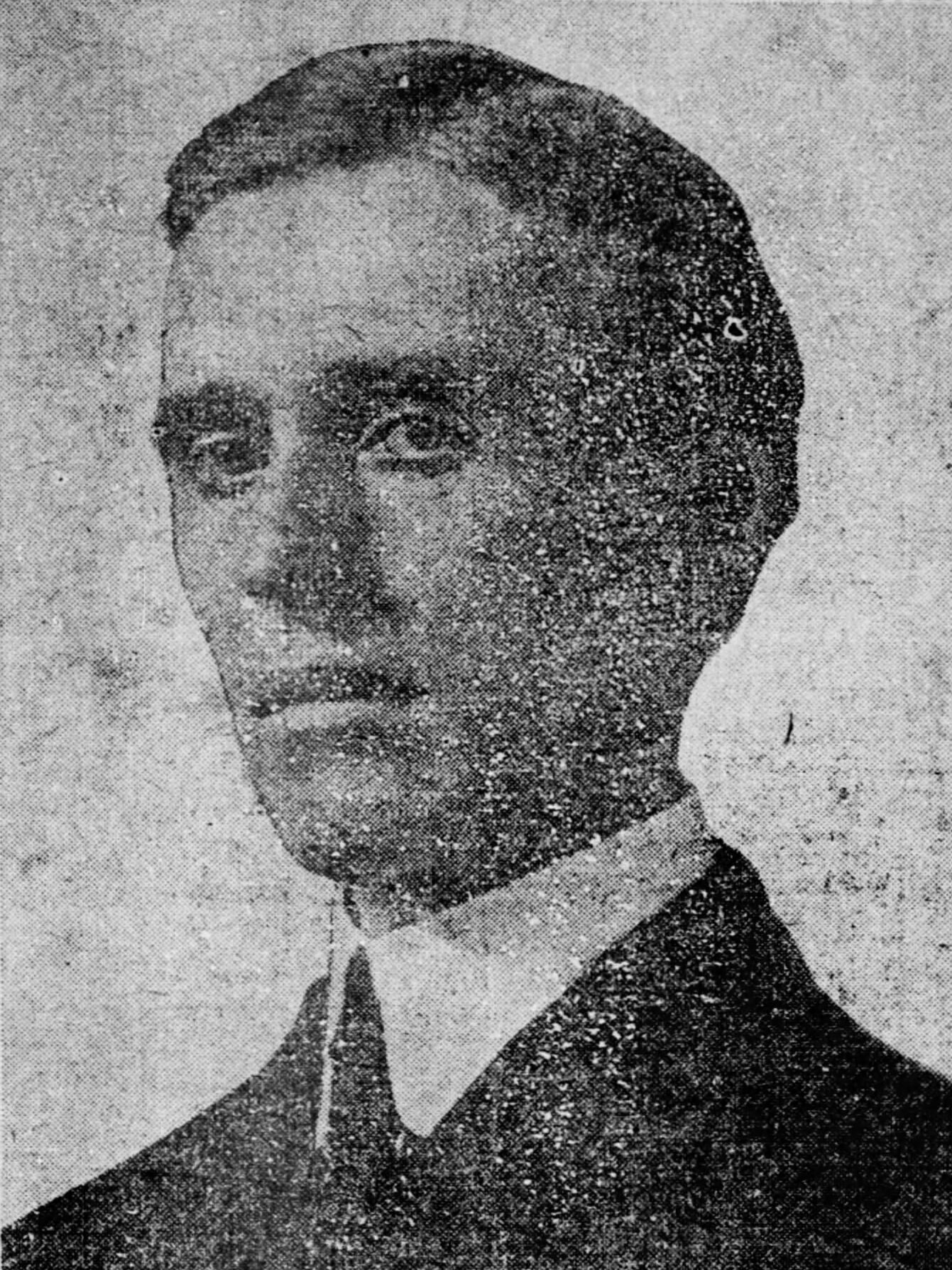
| Nominee | William Northcott | Elmer A. Perry |
| Party | Republican | Democratic |
| Popular vote | 584,717 | 509,686 |
| Percentage | 52.06% | 45.38% |
Lieutenant Governor before election
William Northcott
Republican
Elected Lieutenant Governor
William Northcott
Republican

The 1900 Illinois lieutenant gubernatorial election was held on November 6, 1900. It saw the reelection of incumbent Republican William Northcott.

== Democratic nomination ==
=== Candidates ===
- Elmer A. Perry, member of the Illinois General Assembly

=== Results ===
Democratic lieutenant gubernatorial nomination, 1st ballot
| Party | Candidate | Votes | % |
|---|---|---|---|
| Democratic | Elmer A. Perry | acclaimed | |

== Republican nomination ==
=== Candidates ===
- William Northcott, incumbent Lieutenant Governor

=== Results ===
Republican lieutenant gubernatorial nomination, 1st ballot
| Party | Candidate | Votes | % |
|---|---|---|---|
| Republican | William Northcott (incumbent) | acclaimed | |

== General election ==
Illinois lieutenant gubernatorial election, 1900
| Party | Candidate | Votes | % | ±% |
|---|---|---|---|---|
| Republican | William Northcott (incumbent) | 584,717 | 52.06% | |
| Democratic | Elmer A. Perry | 509,686 | 45.38% | |
| Prohibition | Joseph A. Harris | 16,452 | 1.47% | |
| Social Democratic | Azel Pierson | 8,891 | 0.79% | |
| Socialist Labor | William W. Cox | 1,313 | 0.12% | |
| Populist | James Ferris | 1,146 | 0.10% | |
| Union Reform Party | L. A. Quellmalz | 651 | 0.06% | |
| United Christian Party | C. H. Thomas | 310 | 0.03% | |
| Majority | | 75,031 | 27.78% | |
| Turnout | | 1,123,166 | 6.68% | |
| Republican hold | | Swing | | |

== See also ==
- 1900 Illinois gubernatorial election

== Bibliography ==
- J. L. Pickering (1901). Official Directory of the Forty-Second General Assembly of Illinois. Session of 1901. Springfield, Illinois: Press of Talbott & Hamann.
- Compiled by James A. Rose, Secretary of State (1900). Official vote of the State of Illinois cast at the General Election, November 6, 1900. Springfield, Illinois: Phillips Bros., State Printers.
