= Thomas Miller Beach =

English spy (1841–1894)

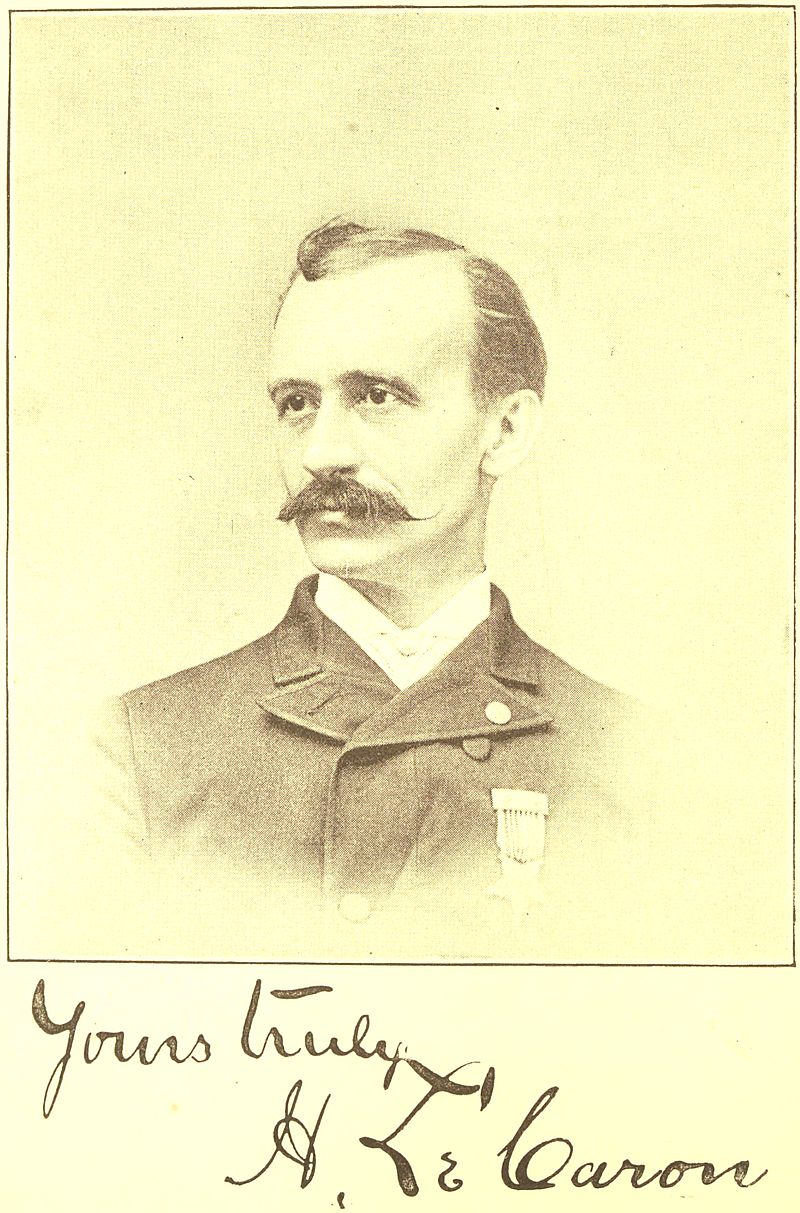
Thomas Miller Beach aka Henri le Caron portrait from his autobiography

Thomas Miller Beach (who used the alias Major Henri Le Caron) (26 September 1841 – 1 April 1894) was an English spy.

For 25 years he lived in Detroit, Michigan, and other places in the United States, paying occasional visits to Europe.

== Early career ==
Beach was born in Colchester, England. When he was 19, he went to Paris, where he found employment in business dealing with the United States.

== Army life ==
Inspired by the American Civil War, he emigrated to the United States in 1861 and enlisted in the Union Army under the name of Henri Le Caron.

In 1864, he married a young woman who had helped him to escape from a Confederate militia, and by the end of the war he had risen to the rank of Major. In 1865, through a fellow Union soldier, John O'Neill, he was brought into contact with the Fenian Brotherhood, and having learnt of the planned Fenian raids against Canada, he mentioned them when writing home to his father in England. Beach's father told his local Member of Parliament, who in turn told the Home Secretary, and the latter asked Beach to supply further information.

== Irish connections ==
His services enabled the British Government to take measures which led to the fiasco of the Canadian invasion of 1870 and Kiel's surrender in 1871, and he supplied full details concerning various Irish-American associations, in which he himself was a prominent member. His successful infiltration of the Fenian Brotherhood and Clan na Gael aided the defence of Upper Canada from the Fenian raids and caused both the failure of the Fenian Dynamite Campaign. In an effort to protect his cover, Beach and his handlers were also complicit in blaming the deaths and arrests of Clan na Gael's dynamite bombers on Dr. Patrick Henry Cronin, which resulted in the latter's 1889 murder in Chicago.

Beach was proficient in medicine, among other skills, and he remained for years on close personal terms with the most extreme men in the Fenian organization. He was in the secrets of the "new departure" in 1879-1881, and in 1881 had an interview with Charles Stewart Parnell at the House of Commons, when the Irish Parliamentary Party leader allegedly spoke sympathetically of an armed nationalist revolution in Ireland.

== Later years ==
The Parnell Commission of 1889 ended Beach's spying career. He was subpoenaed by The Times, and in the witness-box he told his whole story, with all the efforts of Charles Russell in cross-examination failing to alter his testimony. The Times lost the case, Beach's career was at an end, and Parnell, who had always insisted that he was opposed to violence, was completely exonerated.

Beach published the story of his life, Twenty-five Years in the Secret Service, in 1892 and it had a wide circulation, but he had to be constantly guarded, his acquaintances were hampered from seeing him, and he suffered from peritonitis, from which he died on 1 April 1894.
