= Rollin S. Williamson =

American politician (1839–1889)

Rollin Samuel Williamson
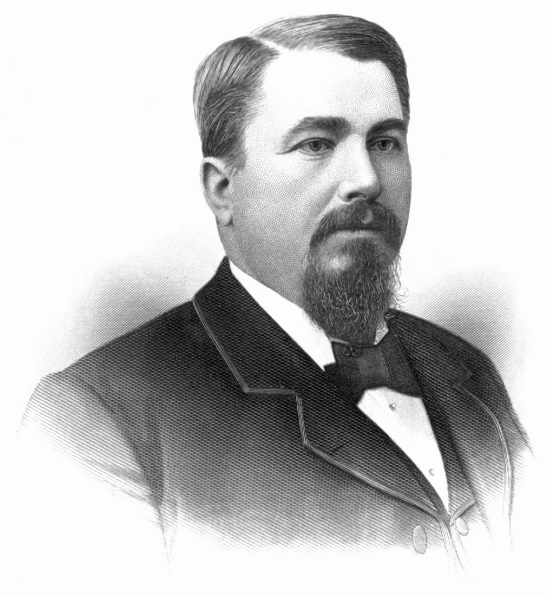

Judge of the Circuit Court of Cook County
- In office June 6, 1887 – August 11, 1889
- Succeeded by: George Driggs

Judge of the Superior Court of Cook County
- In office November 23, 1880 – December 6, 1886
- Preceded by: Seat created
- Succeeded by: John Peter Altgeld

Member of the Illinois Senate from the 7th district
- In office January 8, 1873 – January 6, 1875
- Preceded by: District created
- Succeeded by: Michael Waller Robinson

Member of the Illinois House of Representatives from the 97th district
- In office January 4, 1871 – January 8, 1873
- Preceded by: District created
- Succeeded by: District abolished

Personal details
- Born: May 23, 1839 Cornwall, Vermont
- Died: August 11, 1889 (aged 50) Palatine, Illinois
- Party: Republican
- Spouse: Emma V. Squires (m. 1859)
- Profession: Attorney

Rollin Samuel Williamson (May 23, 1839 – August 11, 1889) was an American politician, jurist, and telegraph operator from Vermont. After learning the telegraph trade in Boston, Massachusetts, Williamson moved to Illinois in 1857. He was appointed operator and station agent in Palatine, Illinois, and studied law in his free time. He served a term in the Illinois House of Representatives then a term in the Illinois Senate. He then began to work up the ranks of the Illinois jurist system before his death.

== Biography ==
Williamson was born in Cornwall, Vermont, on May 23, 1839. He lived in the town until he was fourteen, attending public schools. Williamson moved to Boston, Massachusetts, to work as a telegraph messenger boy. Two years later, he was promoted to operator and was assigned to offices through New England and New York. In 1857, he moved to Chicago, Illinois, to work in telegraph office there. The manager sent him to Palatine, Illinois, as a station agent and operator. During his down time on the job, he read law text books. Williamson occasionally helped locals with law issues. He was admitted to the bar in 1870.

He served as the Palatine Township clerk, the village clerk, the police magistrate, and in 1865, he was elected Justice of the Peace of Palatine Township. The Apportionment of 1870, the first under the new Constitution of 1870, created a map with 97 districts (previously 61 districts). He was elected in 1870 as a Republican as one of six members from the 97th district. He served one two-year term. An act reapportioning the legislature passed on March 1, 1872, which created a new 7th Senate district that included most townships in Cook County. He then served a term in the Illinois Senate, serving two years. In 1880, he was elected judge of the Superior Court of Cook County. He served as a Superior Court judge from November 23, 1880, until December 6, 1886. He was succeeded by future governor John Peter Altgeld. On June 6, 1887, he was elected to a four-year term to the Circuit Court of Cook County. He died before the term was complete. George Driggs won the special election to fill the vacancy created by Williamson's death.

Stained glass window dedicated to Williamson at First United Methodist Church of Palatine

Williamson was a Methodist Episcopal and was the superintendent of the Sunday school at his church. He was active in Freemasonry and was Master of the Palatine lodge. He married Emma V. Squires on September 4, 1859. They had one daughter. In June 1889, Williamson had a mental breakdown; he had been subject to mood disorders for several years prior. Four weeks later, he had to be confined to his bed. Williamson died at his house in Palatine on August 11, 1889, and was buried there in Hillside Cemetery.
