= Joel Minnick Longenecker =

J. M. Longenecker

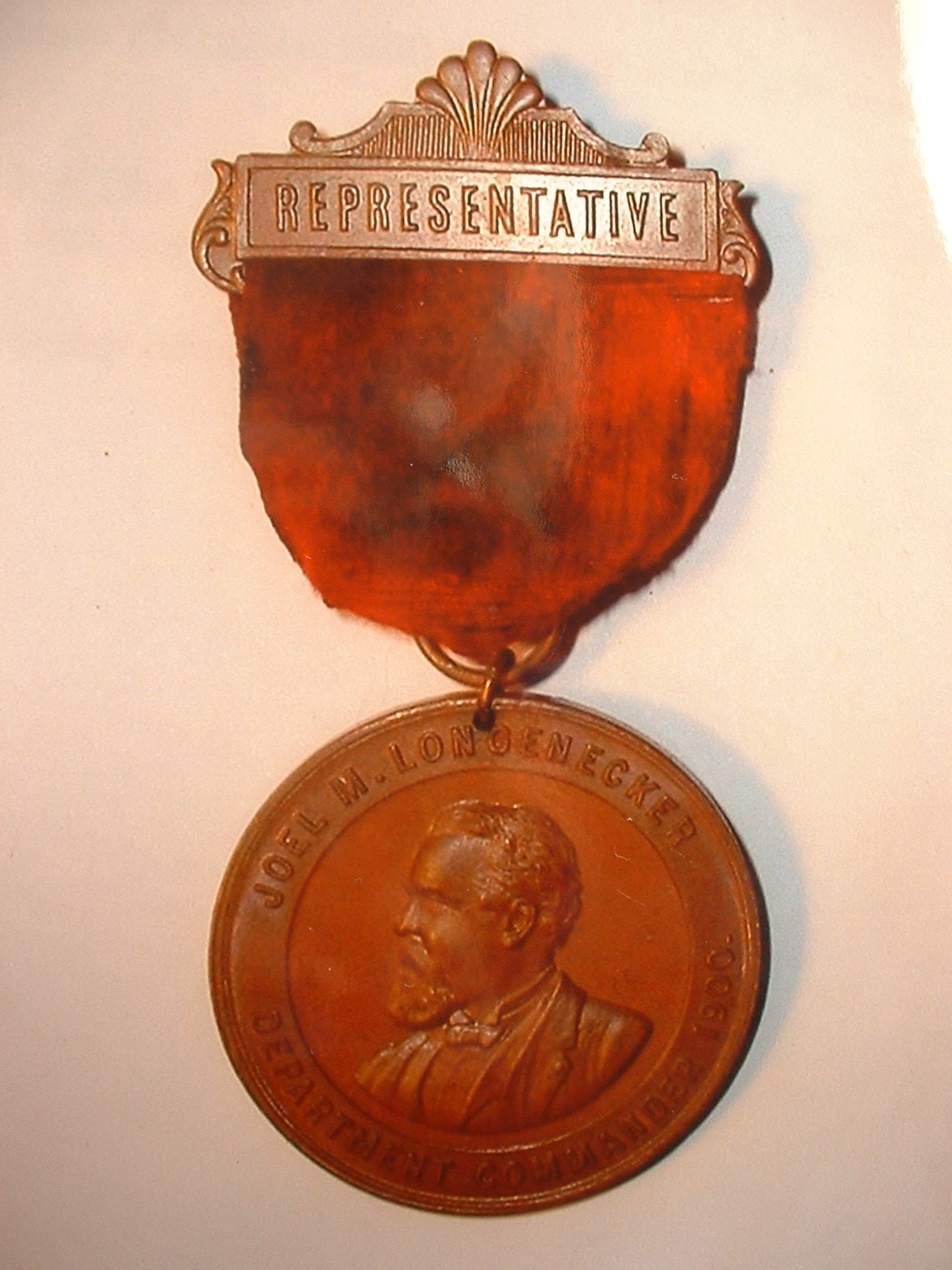
Ill. District Commander G.A.R. Bronze low-relief medal 38 mm dia.

Joel Minnick Longenecker (January 12, 1847 – September 19, 1906) was an American farmer, soldier, lawyer, State's Attorney, judge, gubernatorial candidate, and Department Commander of the Illinois Grand Army of the Republic. He was active in nationally prominent trials involving the Chicago Anarchists, and Irish nationalists.

Longenecker had been a farmer in Robinson, Illinois, Crawford County.. In the American Civil War, Longenecker, age 18, joined Co. F, 5th Regiment of the Illinois Cavalry as a private on December 4, 1864, in Olney, Illinois. He served for one year with no apparent distinction.

After the war, Longenecker taught school for two terms, and – after he came of age – was elected Justice of the Peace while he was studying law at Robinson. He married Emma Florence Fitch on August 30, 1870. In 1871, Longenecker was admitted to the bar at Olney, Illinois at which time he served as City Attorney. From 1876 to 1880 he was State’s Attorney serving at Richland County, and from 1882 to 1899, tried over 35 reported decisions as State’s Attorney in Chicago, Cook County.

He was prominent in such trials as the anarchist and the infamous Irish Nationalist Dr. Patrick Henry Cronin murder case.

From 1899, Longenecker served as a Judge in Cook County.

On May 3, 1890, he was elected Department Commander of the Illinois Grand Army of the Republic. During his term as Commander, as reported by The New York Times, "Judge Joel M. Longenecker is Chairman of the General Committee and is hosting the National G.A.R. Encampment in Chicago on August 21 through September 1, 1900." Also, as the Times reported, "This City is preparing for what is expected to be the greatest Grand Army Encampment in the history of the organization." Longenecker officially received President William McKinley and the Governor of Illinois at the parade review stand on Tuesday, August 28, 1900.

A bronze-medal bas-relief of Longenecker is shown in the photograph. The reverse side of the low-relief emblem reads, "35th Annual Encampment, Department of Illinois, G. A. R., Peoria, Ill’s. May 14–15-16, 1901." This medallion marked the end of Judge Longenecker’s 10-year term as GAR Illinois Department Commander.

In August 1906, Judge Longenecker’s strength failed. He went to Paw Paw Lake in Berrien County, Michigan to recuperate, and on September 19, 1906, died from cirrhosis of the liver, probably due – in no small part – to excessive drinking. In his obituary, it is stated that Longenecker was second in the Republican primary race (year?) for Governor of the State of Illinois.
