= Lyman Beecher Ray =

American politician

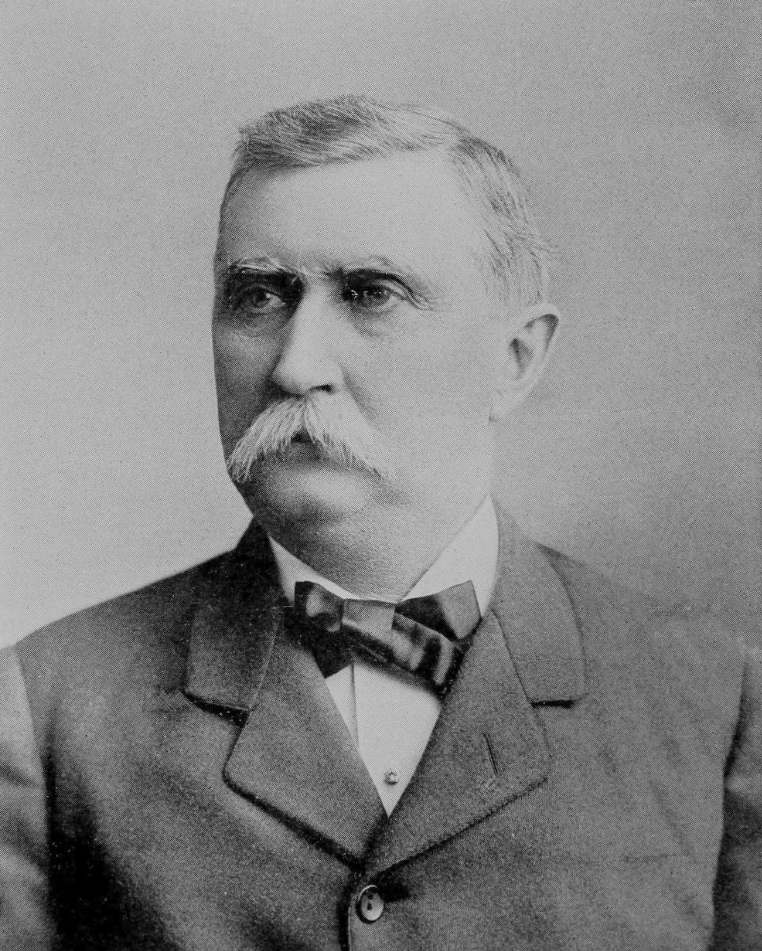

25th Lieutenant Governor of Illinois
- In office January 14, 1889 – January 10, 1893
- Governor: Joseph W. Fifer
- Preceded by: John C. Smith
- Succeeded by: Joseph B. Gill

Member of the Illinois Senate from the 17th district
- In office 1882 – 1886
- Preceded by: Samuel R. Lewis
- Succeeded by: Charles F. Greenwood

Member of the Illinois House of Representatives
- In office 1873-1883

Personal details
- Born: August 17, 1831 Hinesburg, Vermont
- Died: August 22, 1916 (aged 85)
- Party: Republican
- Spouse: Julia N. Reading
- Profession: Merchant
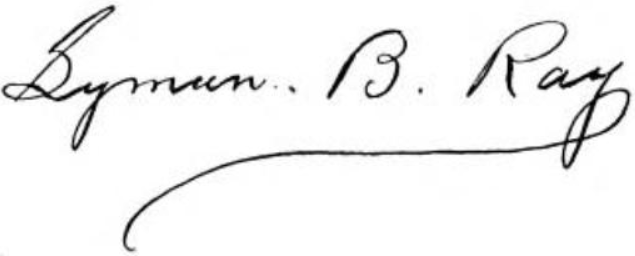
- Signature

Lyman Beecher Ray (August 17, 1831 – August 22, 1916) was an American politician from Vermont. After learning the merchant trade, Ray moved west to Kane County, Illinois, working in a shop for three years. He later opened a store in Morris, Illinois, operating it for thirty-three years and become a prominent citizen there. He was elected to one term in the Illinois House of Representatives and the Illinois Senate. In 1888, Ray was elected Lieutenant Governor of Illinois.

== Biography ==
Lyman Beecher Ray was born in Hinesburg, Vermont, on August 17, 1831. He was raised on the family farm and first attended public schools before receiving education at a private academy. He then taught school for several years, then worked for a year as a merchant's clerk. In 1852, he decided to move to Kane County, Illinois, and found work in a general store. Three years later, he moved to Morris, Illinois, where he opened a store. Ray would run the Morris store for thirty-three years.

Ray joined the Republican Party upon its formation in 1856 and campaigned on behalf of presidential candidate John C. Frémont and gubernatorial candidate William H. Bissell. He would again campaign on behalf of the party in 1860. He was often a delegate to the state Republican conventions. In 1872, he was nominated by the party for a seat on the Illinois House of Representatives and was elected to a two-year term. He was elected to the Illinois Senate in 1882, serving a four-year term. In 1888, he was nominated as Lieutenant Governor of Illinois on a ticket with Joseph W. Fifer and was elected, retiring from his store.

Ray was re-nominated to the office in 1892, but the ticket lost to John Peter Altgeld. In 1894, he was named president of the State League of Republican Clubs, and served as a member of the national organization. He became an advocate against free silver.

Ray married Julia N. Reading, the daughter of state representative James M. Reading, on December 20, 1858. They had one daughter (Julia E.). Ray died in on August 22, 1916, and was buried in Elmhurst Cemetery in Joliet, Illinois.

Party political offices
| Preceded by John C. Smith | Republican nominee for Lieutenant Governor of Illinois; 1888, 1892 | Succeeded by William Northcott |
Political offices
| Preceded by John C. Smith | Lieutenant Governor of Illinois; 1889–1893 | Succeeded by Joseph B. Gill |
