= John Peter Altgeld =

Governor of Illinois from 1893 to 1897

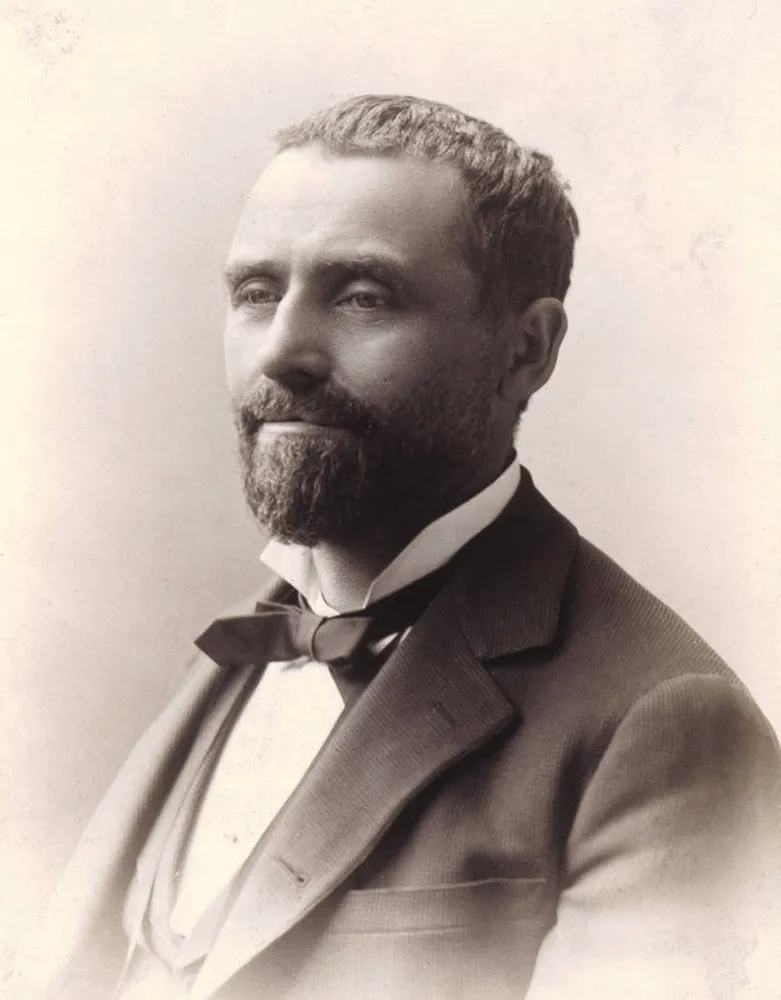
- Altgeld c. 1893

20th Governor of Illinois
- In office January 10, 1893 – January 11, 1897
- Lieutenant: Joseph B. Gill
- Preceded by: Joseph W. Fifer
- Succeeded by: John R. Tanner

Judge of the Superior Court of Cook County
- In office December 6, 1886 – August 1, 1891
- Preceded by: Rollin S. Williamson
- Succeeded by: Jonas Hutchinson

Personal details
- Born: December 30, 1847 Selters, Duchy of Nassau
- Died: March 12, 1902 (aged 54) Joliet, Illinois, U.S.
- Party: Democratic
- Spouse: Emma Ford (m. 1877)
- Profession: Judge, lawyer
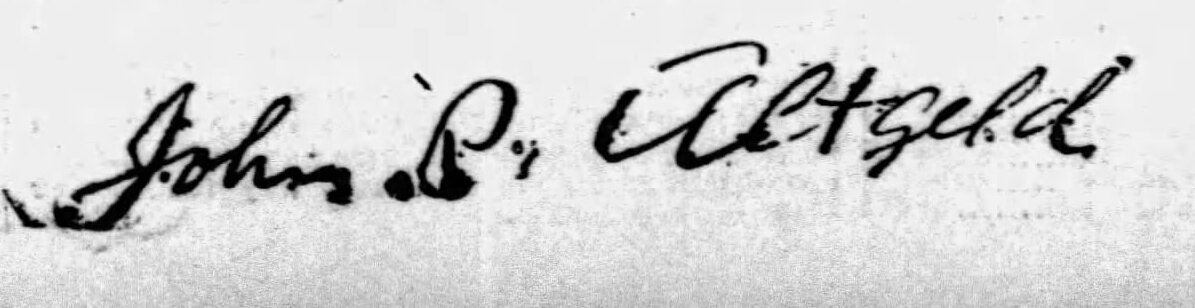
- Signature

Military service
- Allegiance: United States
- Branch/service: United States Army
- Years of service: 1863–1865
- Rank: Private
- Unit: 164th Ohio Infantry
- Battles/wars: American Civil War

John Peter Altgeld (December 30, 1847 – March 12, 1902) was an American politician and the 20th governor of Illinois, serving from 1893 until 1897. He was the first Democrat to govern that state since the 1850s, and would remain the only one to do so until the 1920s. A leading figure of the Progressive movement, Altgeld signed workplace safety and child labor laws, pardoned three of the men convicted in the Haymarket Affair, and rejected calls in 1894 to break up the Pullman strike by force. In 1896 he was a leader of the progressive wing of the Democratic Party, opposing President Grover Cleveland and the conservative Bourbon Democrats. He was defeated for reelection in 1896 in an intensely fought, bitter campaign.

Born in the Duchy of Nassau, Germany, Altgeld grew up on a farm in the American Midwest. After a short time in the Union Army as a youth, he studied law in Missouri, while working as a manual laborer, and became involved in progressive politics. He eventually opened a law practice in Chicago, becoming a real estate developer, and local judge before being elected governor. After his term as governor, he worked in the law office of Clarence Darrow but, often in poor health throughout his life, died at the age of 54.

== Early life ==
Altgeld was born in the town of Selters in the German Westerwald, the first son of John P. and Mary Altgeld. His parents left Germany when he was three months old, bringing their infant son with them. They settled on a farm near Mansfield, Ohio. He left home at age 16 to join the Union Army; lying about his age, he enlisted in the 164th Ohio (National Guard) Infantry. Altgeld's regiment served in Virginia as a reserve unit, doing labor and reconnaissance, participating in only one skirmish. Altgeld himself nearly died of fever. He then worked on his father's farm, studied in the library of a neighbor and at a private school in Lexington, Ohio, and for two years taught school.

After a brief stint in an Ohio seminary, he walked to Missouri and studied to become a lawyer while working on itinerant railroad construction crews. Becoming ill from the climate and the labor, Altgeld wandered to Kansas and Iowa before settling as a teacher and farmhand near Savannah, Missouri. There, he began to read law at a private law firm and was admitted to the Andrew County bar in 1871. He was not educated at any university. The university law school at which he would have studied was not even founded until 1872, one year before Altgeld was admitted to the bar. In Savannah, Altgeld first became involved in politics. He served as city attorney and was elected state's attorney, resigning after one year of a two-year term.

In 1875, Altgeld moved to Chicago hoping to continue his legal career there. He frequently visited his home in Ohio. He was married to Emma Ford, the daughter of John Ford and Ruth Smith, in 1877 in Richland County, Ohio. Their marriage was a happy one by all accounts but produced no children.

Altgeld's practice of law began to show success and he was managing an independent legal practice by 1880. He became wealthy, however, from a series of real estate dealings and development projects, including residential and office properties in Chicago and a streetcar line in Newark, Ohio. His most notable project was the Unity Building (1891), the 16-story office building that was at that time Chicago's tallest building. In January 1890, Altgeld bought a lot at what is now 127 North Dearborn Street in downtown Chicago, and he established the Unity Company to build and manage the future Unity Building. He indiscriminately contributed his own fortune toward the endeavor, and for a while the construction was moving more quickly than expected. However, this led to a $100,000 mistake and much of the framework of the building had to be rebuilt. Altgeld also made an error by trying to borrow $400,000 from John R. Walsh, president of the Jennings Trust Company and of the Chicago National Bank. Technicalities in the contract caused many problems for Altgeld. Eventually, a new contract was signed, but Altgeld was able to borrow only $300,000 from Walsh. He ended up raising the rest of the money himself, and the construction of the Unity Building was completed. In 1893, he declared that the Unity Building had given him the most personal satisfaction of all his achievements.

Altgeld became a millionaire, and would, by the time he ran for governor, own six buildings in Chicago.

== Early political career ==
Altgeld's name, according to historian Philip Dray, "is synonymous with the dawn of the Progressive era." His first public post was city attorney in Savannah, Missouri, in which capacity he rewrote a code of ordinances. In Missouri Altgeld became involved in the Granger movement and the Democratic Party and was elected to be state's attorney for the county in 1874. As Altgeld later wrote, he quickly became disillusioned with the criminal justice system and resigned after just one year.

Altgeld decided to run for Congress in 1884 against incumbent George Adams of Illinois's 4th congressional district. That year, he published an essay on penal reform entitled, Our Penal Machinery and Its Victims. His essay argued that rather than reform criminals, incarceration produced hardened criminals. Although this district was heavily Republican, Adams defeated him by just 8 points (54–46%), a better showing than well-known Democrat Lambert Tree had made two years earlier. As a Republican leader recalled, "He (Altgeld) was not elected, but our executive committee was pretty badly frightened by the strong canvass he made."

Altgeld assumed the office of Judge of the Superior Court of Cook County on December 6, 1886.succeeding Judge Rollin S. Williamson. He resigned in August 1891 to pursue private business interests. He was succeeded as a judge by Jonas Hutchinson.

== Illinois governorship ==
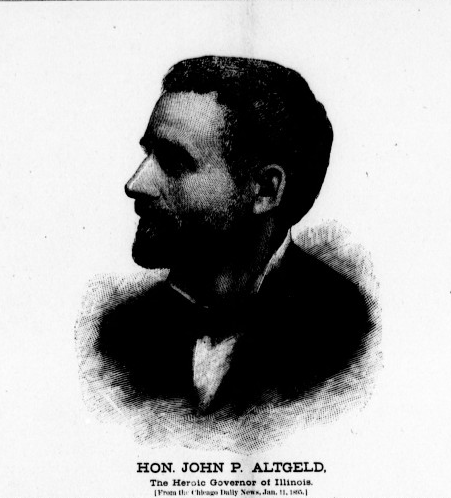
John P. Altgeld, 1895

In 1891, he unsuccessfully challenged John M. Palmer in seeking to have the Illinois General Assembly appoint him to the United States Senate.

=== 1892 gubernatorial election ===
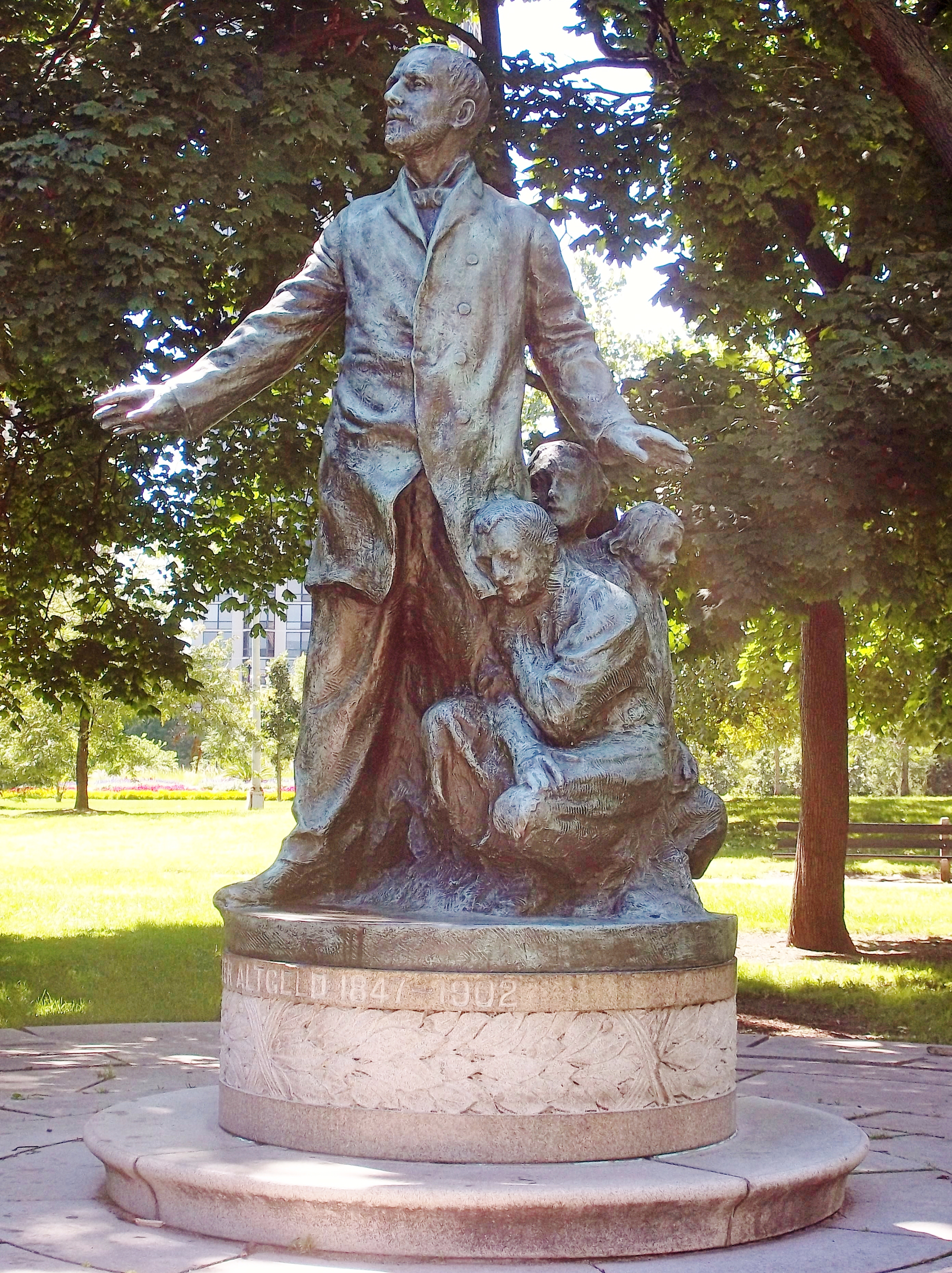
Altgeld Monument by Gutzon Borglum, erected by the Illinois Legislature in Lincoln Park, Chicago (on Labor Day, 1915)

He was drafted by the Democrats to run for Governor of Illinois.

One of the obstacles in the way of Altgeld receiving the Democratic nomination was Palmer, still bitter over Altgeld challenging him for Senate in 1891. Viewed as an elder statesman of the party, Palmer's opposition to Altgeld would have carried weight. Altgeld supporter Michael C. McDonald made an empty promise to Palmer that, in turn for not opposing Altgeld's candidacy, Cook County Democrats would support him for the party's presidential nomination in the same year's presidential election.

Altgeld was popular among his fellow German Americans.

The only Chicago newspaper that provided positive coverage of Altgeld was the Chicago Globe, which was run by Michael C. McDonald. Elsewhere in the Chicago press, Altgeld received vilification for his political association with Michael C. McDonald, his liberal sympathies towards the men convicted in the Haymarket Affair, and his alliance with Chicago's Iroquois Club. He was painted as a hazardous radical and a dangerous threat to the state's business and commercial concerns. However, many downstate newspapers provided positive coverage to Altgeld.

Also initially seeking the Democratic nomination was John C. Black. Other potential candidates were dissuaded from running. For instance, State Representative James Cockrell was convinced by Clarence Darrow to abandon his plans of running. However, by February 23, it was reported that Black had withdrawn from the race, leaving Altgeld as the only candidate seeking the Democratic nomination. Altgeld won the Democratic nomination on the first ballot at the state convention in Springfield.

Altgeld's supporters dubbed him, "the poor man's friend".

In the general election he faced popular incumbent Republican governor Joseph W. Fifer.

Altgeld traveled across the state to campaign on a vigorous speaking tour. He attacked Fifer's use of prison labor for state projects, and attacked his school reform record. Fifer did not refute Altgeld's allegations against his record, which helped make them stick in the minds of voters.

To dampen the negative impact that his association with Altgeld would have on Altgeld's electability, particularly among rural downstate voters, Michael C. McDonald temporarily resigned his role on the Cook County Central Committee a month before the election.

Altgeld narrowly defeated Fifer. He was the first Democrat to have been elected governor of Illinois since 1856, the first time a foreign-born citizen had been elected, and the first time a Chicago resident had been elected.

=== Transition ===
Altgeld suffered a nervous breakdown shortly after his victory, and nearly died of a concomitant fever. He managed to appear at his inauguration, but was only able to deliver a brief portion of his speech. Although the General Assembly hall was so warm as to cause several men to faint, Altgeld, clad in a heavy topcoat, was pale and visibly shivering. The clerk of the Assembly delivered the remainder of his speech.

=== Tenure ===
As governor, Altgeld spearheaded the nation's most progressive child labor and occupational safety laws, appointed women to important positions in the state government, and vastly increased state funding for education.

==== Pullman Strike ====
In 1894, the Pullman Rail Strike, led by Eugene V. Debs, took place. Altgeld, however, refused to authorize President Grover Cleveland to send in Federal troops to quell the disturbances. Altgeld wrote to President Cleveland indicating that reports of strike-related violence had been exaggerated and warned that real violence would begin only as a result of sending soldiers. Nevertheless, a federal injunction was issued against the strike, with disruption of U.S. Mail deliveries, a Federal concern, cited as a justification. However, the superintendent of mails, L. L. Troy, stated that no mail had been disrupted. Citing Article IV of the Constitution, which permits federal troops to enter a state only if a condition of insurrection exists, Altgeld argued that there was no legal bearing to a decision to send the military to quell the strike. Finally, he took the occasion to criticize the attorney general's misuse of court injunctions under the Sherman Act, writing: "This decision marks a turning point in our history for it establishes a new form of government never before heard of among men; that is government by injunction. ... Under this new order of things a federal judge becomes at once a legislator, court and executioner." However, on July 4, 1894, Cleveland went ahead and sent several thousand troops to Chicago without Altgeld's approval, an action later upheld by the U.S. Supreme Court. Altgeld's opposition was seen as a highly unusual stance for a state governor at that time. Altgeld may have opposed the use of federal troops but he wielded the state militia to rein in the strike. He sent the militia to eight areas during the strike, including to Mount Olive, where the miners blocked the Chicago, Peoria, and St. Louis railroad from shipping coal. Once there the Governor issued General Order No. 8, which prohibited them from being used "as custodians or guards of private property."

==== Pardons and clemency ====
Historically, Altgeld is remembered chiefly for pardoning the three surviving men convicted in the 1886 Haymarket bombing (four others had already been executed, one committed suicide in prison). After reviewing their cases, Altgeld concluded that the trial had taken place in such an atmosphere of prejudice that the convictions were not credible. Although he came under intense attack for pardoning the remaining defendants, subsequent scholars have concluded that there had been a serious miscarriage of justice in their prosecutions.

Some argue that in addition to his findings that there had been a miscarriage of justice, Altgeld was also motivated by revenge in his Haymarket pardon. The judge who prosecuted the men, Joseph E. Gary, had upheld a ruling that found Altgeld in contempt of the Cook County Superior Court. Altgeld was known to hold strong grudges.

By the end of 1895, he freed eighty-one prisoners, leading newspapers to dub him John "Pardon" Altgeld.

In May 1895, mob violence erupted after one of Altgeld's pardons, with farmers lynching two accused rapists in Danville.

On his last day in office, he released twenty-six offenders convicted of serious crimes, including seven murderers.

In total, he pardoned or commuted sentences of:

- 75 people convicted of forgery, embezzlement, manslaughter, burglary, or larceny
- 19 people convicted of murder
- 8 people convicted of rape, assault, or incest
- 5 people convicted or armed robbery or arson

=== Unsuccessful 1896 reelection campaign ===
The Pullman incident and the Haymarket pardons were used against Altgeld by his conservative enemies. Altgeld was ineligible to run for president (since he was born in Germany), but he led the fight against the Cleveland forces in 1896. Altgeld publicly broke from Cleveland and his conservative supporters. Altgeld helped split the Democratic Party during the 1896 presidential election into Free Silver and Bourbon Democrats. He ran for re-election on the same ticket with Democratic presidential nominee William Jennings Bryan. Altgeld had not supported Bryan for the nomination and hesitated to support the "Free Silver" plank that was central to Bryan's campaign. Harper's Weekly warned that Bryan would be a puppet of Altgeld, whom it referred to as "the ambitious and unscrupulous Illinois communist." However, Bryan, who was being hurt by Republican charges that he was a stooge for Altgeld, avoided the governor and did not endorse him.

Republicans in Illinois focused their attacks on Altgeld. Theodore Roosevelt, before an audience of 13,000 cheering partisans in Chicago, said Altgeld was "one who would connive at wholesale murder," who "condones and encourages the most infamous of murders," and who "would substitute for the government of Washington and Lincoln a red welter of lawlessness and dishonesty as fantastic and vicious as the Paris Commune." Altgeld campaigned energetically despite his failing health, but was defeated by John R. Tanner; Altgeld outpolled his party's presidential candidate, Bryan, by 10,000 votes in Illinois.

== Chicago mayoral candidacies ==
=== 1899 ===
Altgeld was a political opponent of Carter H. Harrison, Jr. (1860–1953), who had been elected Mayor of Chicago in 1897. Altgeld believed that Harrison aimed to spearhead conservative forces in the Democratic Party at the national level and that if Harrison were re-elected as mayor he would have the power to handpick conservative delegates to the 1900 Democratic National Convention. Finding Harrison's prospective opponent, a "Free Silver" Republican, a less offensive option, Altgeld decided to himself run for Mayor – having faint hope of victory himself, but seeking to split away the progressive Democratic vote and thereby send Harrison to defeat.

Altgeld charged that Harrison was building a political machine and that his administration was corrupt, publicly claiming in March 1899 that Harrison's administration was complicit in the theft of city funds by political allies in connection with city public works projects.

In his final campaign, Altgeld ran for mayor of Chicago as the candidate of the Municipal Ownership Party. He finished third, garnering more than 15 percent of the vote, but was unable to achieve his ulterior motive, the defeat of Mayor Carter Harrison.

=== 1901 ===
In 1901, Altgeld made a quixotic effort to challenge Harrison for the Democratic nomination for mayor.

== Post-gubernatorial years ==
Sickly since his brush with death in the Civil War, Altgeld had suffered from locomotor ataxia while governor, impairing his ability to walk. He lost all of his property except his heavily mortgaged personal residence, and only the intervention of his friend and former protégé, Clarence Darrow, saved him from complete financial ruin.

== Death and legacy ==
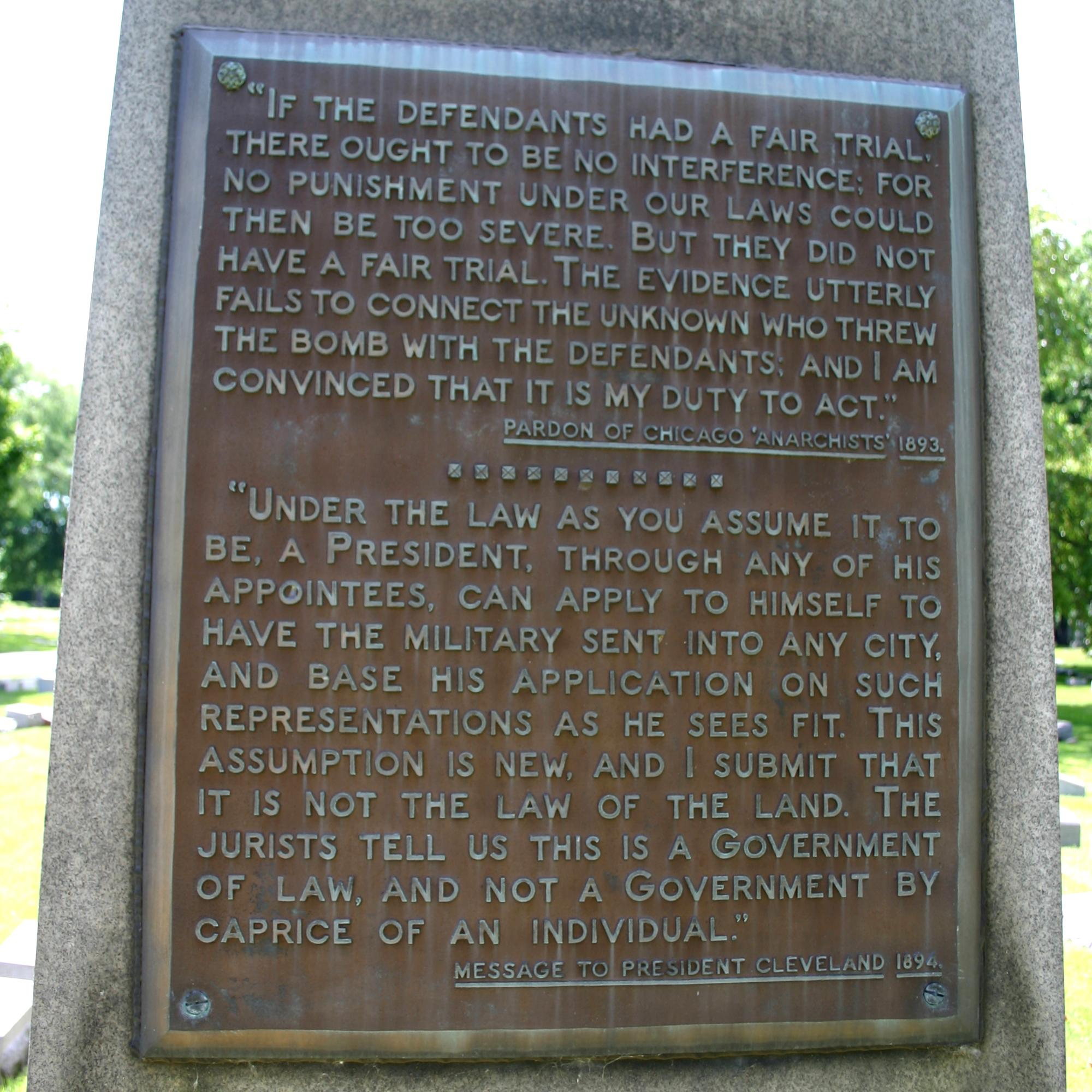
The reverse of Altgeld's grave marker in Graceland Cemetery, Uptown, Chicago

Altgeld was working as a lawyer in Darrow's law firm when he suffered a cerebral hemorrhage while delivering a speech on behalf of the Boers in Joliet, Illinois, in March 1902. He was 54 years old when he died. Thousands filed past his body as it lay in state in the lobby of the Chicago Public Library, and he was eulogized by Darrow and by Hull House founder Jane Addams. Poet Vachel Lindsay wrote a poem, "The Eagle That Is Forgotten," in memory of Altgeld.

Altgeld is buried in Graceland Cemetery in Uptown, Chicago.

The governor influenced the design of five castle-like structures at Illinois universities. One is Altgeld Hall at the University of Illinois at Urbana-Champaign, which is on the National Register of Historic Places. It is currently home to the Mathematics Department, and had previously housed the College of Law and the University Library. The other four are at Southern Illinois University Carbondale and Northern Illinois University, as well as John W. Cook Hall at Illinois State University and Old Main at Eastern Illinois University. Chicago's Altgeld Gardens Homes, one of the first housing projects in the United States, was named after the former governor as well as the street located at 2500 North in Chicago's grid system, Altgeld Street. There is a statue of Altgeld in Lincoln Park in Chicago at 2045 Lincoln Park West; east of Lincoln Park West, south of Dickens St.

== See also ==
- List of United States governors born outside the United States

== Sources ==
- Barnard, Harry (1938). Eagle Forgotten, the Life of John Peter Altgeld. Indianapolis, IN: Bobbs-Merrill.
- Browne, Waldo R. (1924). Altgeld of Illinois: A Record of His Life and Labor. New York: B.W. Huebsch.
- Dray (2010). There is Power in a Union. Doubleday. ISBN 978-0-385-52629-6.
- Fast, Howard (1946). The American: A Middle Western Legend. New York: Duell, Sloan And Pearce.
- Wish, Harvey (December 1938b). "Governor Altgeld Pardons the Anarchists". Journal of the Illinois State Historical Society. 31 (4): 424–448. JSTOR 40187873.
- Wish, Harvey (March 1938a). "John Peter Altgeld and the Background of the Campaign of 1896". Mississippi Valley Historical Review. 24 (4): 503–518. doi:10.2307/1947044. JSTOR 1947044.
- Wish, Harvey (October 1937). "John Peter Altgeld and the Election of 1896". Journal of the Illinois State Historical Society. 30 (3): 353–384. JSTOR 40187483.

Party political offices
| Preceded by John M. Palmer | Democratic nominee for Governor of Illinois; 1892, 1896 | Succeeded by Samuel Alschuler |
Political offices
| Preceded by Joseph W. Fifer | Governor of Illinois; 1893–1897 | Succeeded by John R. Tanner |
