= William Northcott =

American politician

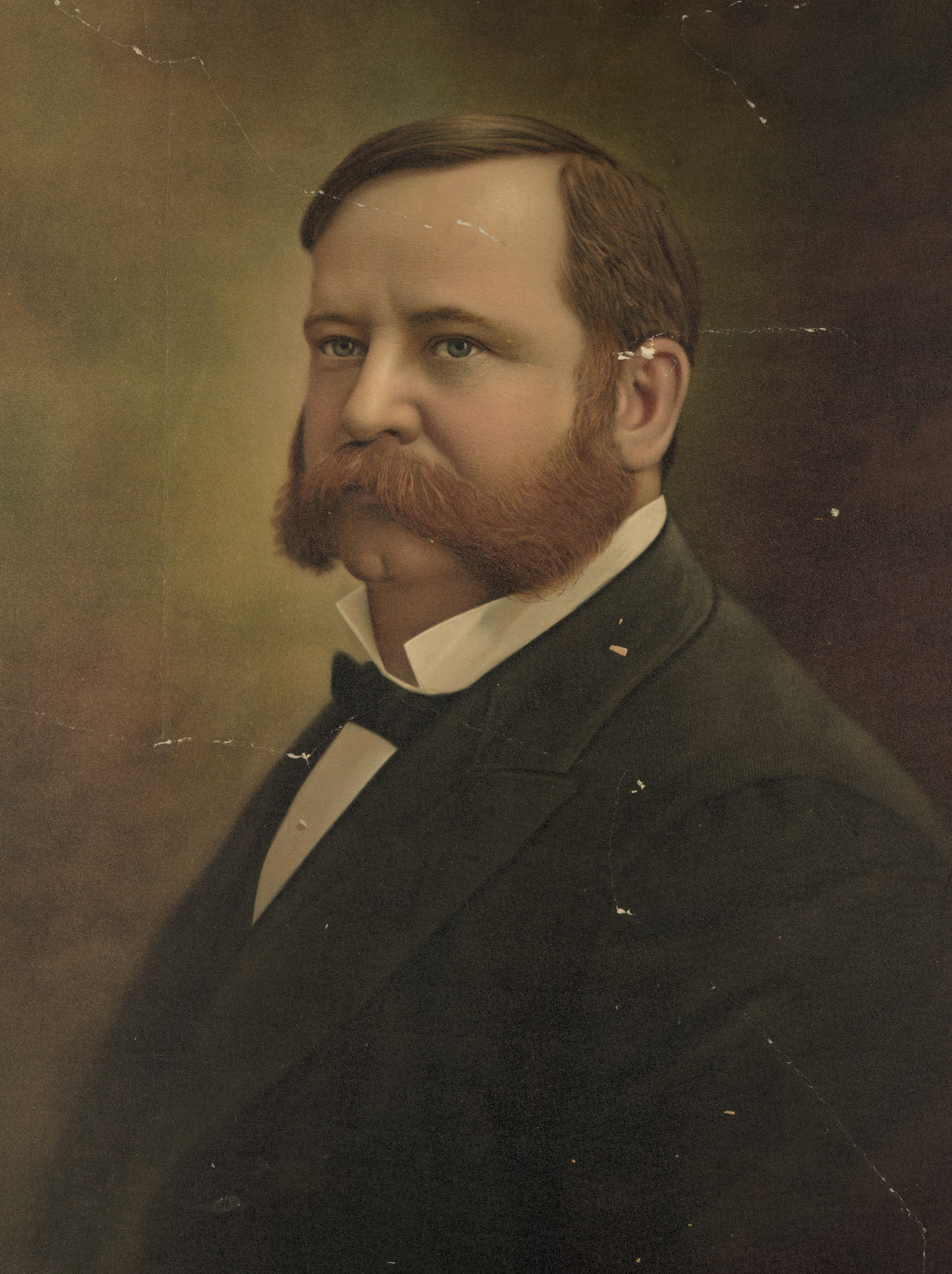
- Portrait of Northcott

27th Lieutenant Governor of Illinois
- In office January 11, 1897 – January 9, 1905
- Governor: John R. Tanner; Richard Yates Jr.
- Preceded by: Joseph B. Gill
- Succeeded by: Lawrence Y. Sherman

Personal details
- Born: William Allen Northcott; January 28, 1854 Murfreesboro, Tennessee
- Died: January 25, 1917 (aged 62) Excelsior Springs, Missouri
- Party: Republican
- Spouses: Julia Dressor (m. 1880; died 1881) Ada R. Stoutzenberg (m. 1882)
- Children: 2
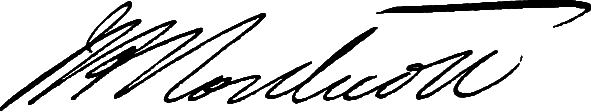
- Signature

William Allen Northcott (January 28, 1854 – January 25, 1917) was an American politician. Between 1897 and 1905 he served two terms as Lieutenant Governor of Illinois.

== Life ==
William Northcott was born in Murfreesboro, Tennessee, on January 28, 1854. He studied law and practiced as an attorney. Between 1882 and 1892 he was the district attorney in Bond County, Illinois. He joined the Republican Party and in 1896 he was elected to the office of the lieutenant governor of Illinois. In this position he served two terms between January 11, 1897, and January 9, 1905, when his second term ended. In this function he was the deputy of the Governors John Riley Tanner and his successor Richard Yates Jr. In 1904 he was an alternate delegate to the Republican National Convention. Between 1905 and 1914 Northcott was the U.S. Attorney for the Eastern District of Illinois.

He married Julia Dressor on March 31, 1880, and they had one son. Julia died in 1881, and he remarried to Ada R. Stoutzenberg. They had one daughter.

William Northcott died on January 25, 1917, in Excelsior Springs, Missouri, and he was buried at Oak Ridge Cemetery in Springfield, Illinois.

== See also ==
- 1900 Illinois lieutenant gubernatorial election

Party political offices
Preceded by Lyman Beecher Ray	Republican nominee for Lieutenant Governor of Illinois; 1896, 1900	Succeeded by Lawrence Yates Sherman
Political offices
Preceded by Joseph B. Gill	Lieutenant Governor of Illinois; 1897–1905	Succeeded by Lawrence Yates Sherman
