= Joseph W. Fifer =

Governor of Illinois from 1889 to 1893

Joseph Wilson Fifer
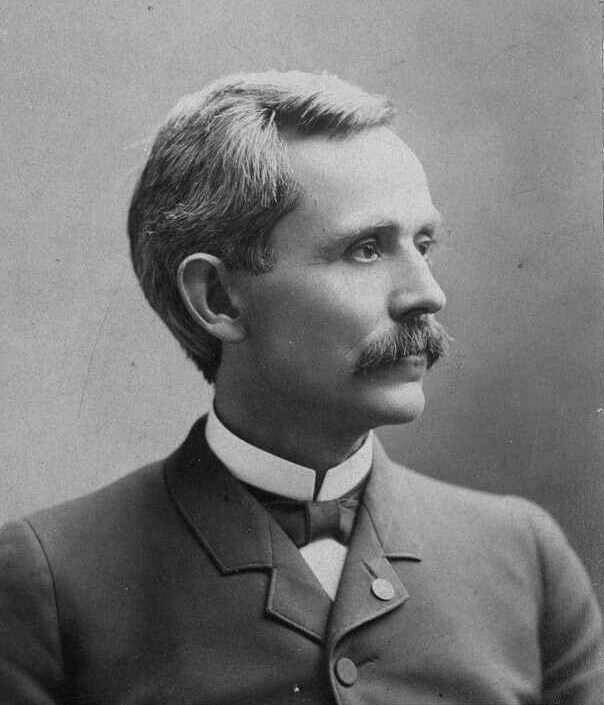
- Fifer c. 1892

19th Governor of Illinois
- In office January 14, 1889 – January 10, 1893
- Lieutenant: Lyman Ray
- Preceded by: Richard J. Oglesby
- Succeeded by: John Peter Altgeld

Commissioner of the Interstate Commerce Commission
- In office November 14, 1899 – December 30, 1905
- Preceded by: William J. Calhoun
- Succeeded by: Franklin Knight Lane

Member of the Illinois Senate from the 28th district
- In office 1881–1885
- Preceded by: John M. Hamilton
- Succeeded by: LaFayette Funk

Personal details
- Born: October 28, 1840 Staunton, Virginia, U.S.
- Died: August 6, 1938 (aged 97) Bloomington, Illinois, U.S.
- Party: Republican

Joseph Wilson Fifer (October 28, 1840 – August 6, 1938) was the 19th governor of Illinois, serving from 1889 to 1893. He also served as a member of the Illinois Senate from 1881 to 1883.

Fifer was born at Staunton, Virginia on October 28, 1840. At the age of 16, in 1856, he moved with his family to Danvers, Illinois and worked in his father's brickyard for several years.

Fifer enlisted as a private in the 33rd Illinois Infantry at the start of the Civil War and was severely wounded at Jackson, Mississippi during General Grant's Vicksburg campaign. He refused a discharge and spent the rest of the war guarding a prison boat.

After the war, Fifer married Gertrude Lewis and had three children. The oldest child died in infancy, leaving Herman and Florence. He studied law at Illinois Wesleyan University and became the tax collector at Danvers Township. He served as the city attorney of Bloomington, Illinois and as a state's attorney as well.

In 1880, he was elected to the state senate from the 28th district, where he served during the 32nd and 33rd General Assemblies. He was preceded by John Marshall Hamilton and succeeded by LaFayette Funk in office.

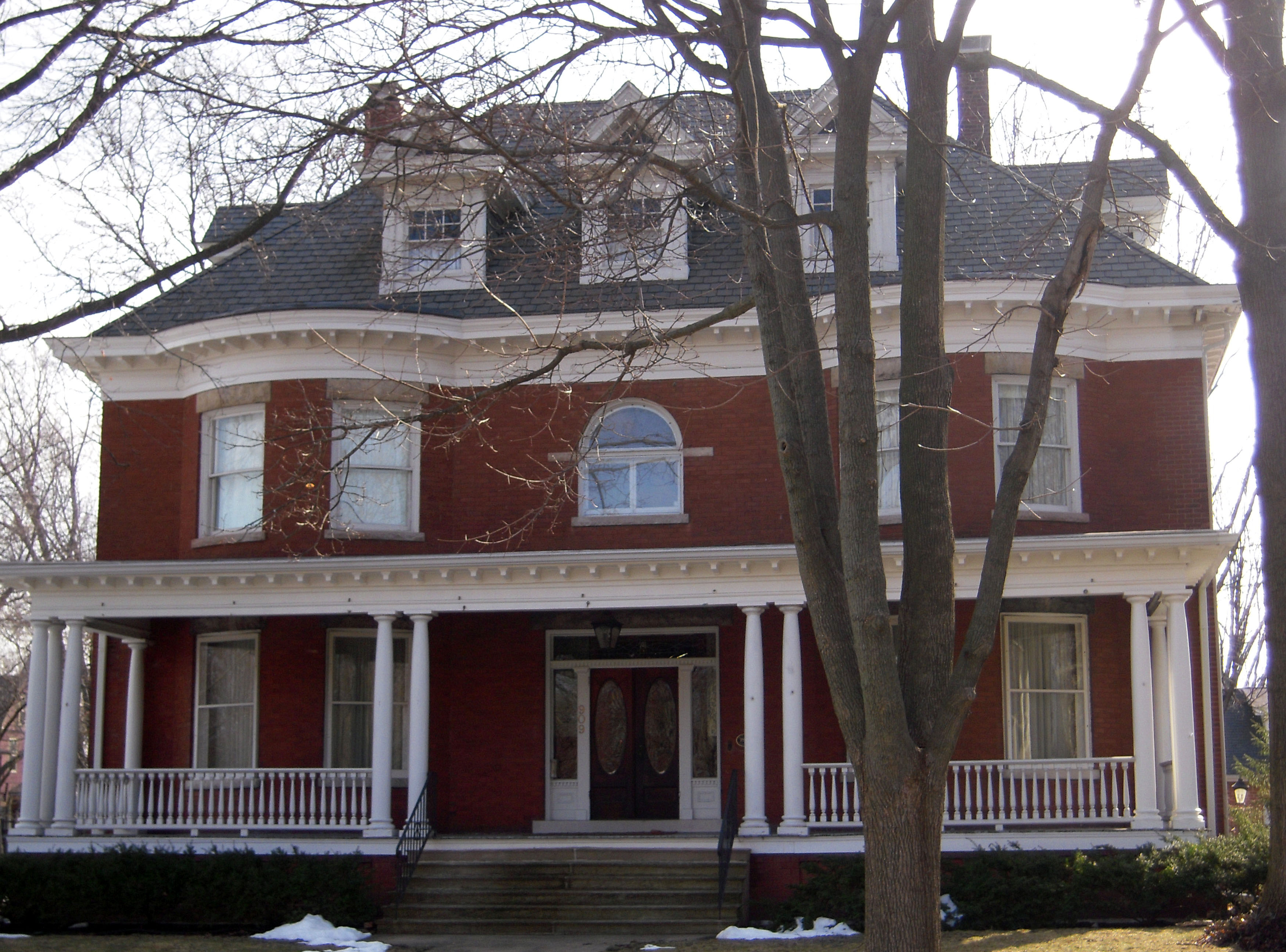
The Fifer home in Bloomington, Illinois

His name was elevated to state level after fighting with General John C. Black, the pension commissioner, when the latter tried to remove him as a "typical Republican politician who did not deserve a pension." Fifer's pension was $24 a month. Due to his celebrity status, Fifer was elected Governor of Illinois in 1889. One of his notable acts as governor was to commute the life sentence of murderer Thomas Neill Cream, allowing his release, and freeing Cream to commit at least four more murders in London.

Fifer lost a reelection bid, and then twice refused the nomination to run again for governor. He was appointed to the Interstate Commerce Commission by President William McKinley in 1899.

Fifer was a delegate to the 1920 Illinois Constitutional Convention. Governor Fifer lived to see his daughter, Florence Fifer Bohrer, elected as the first female state senator of Illinois in 1924.

Party political offices
Preceded by Richard J. Oglesby	Republican nominee for Governor of Illinois; 1888, 1892	Succeeded by John Riley Tanner
Political offices
Preceded by Richard J. Oglesby	Governor of Illinois; 1889–1893	Succeeded by John P. Altgeld
Government offices
Preceded by William J. Calhoun	Commissioner of the Interstate Commerce Commission; 1899–1905	Succeeded by Franklin Knight Lane
