= Joseph B. Gill =

American politician

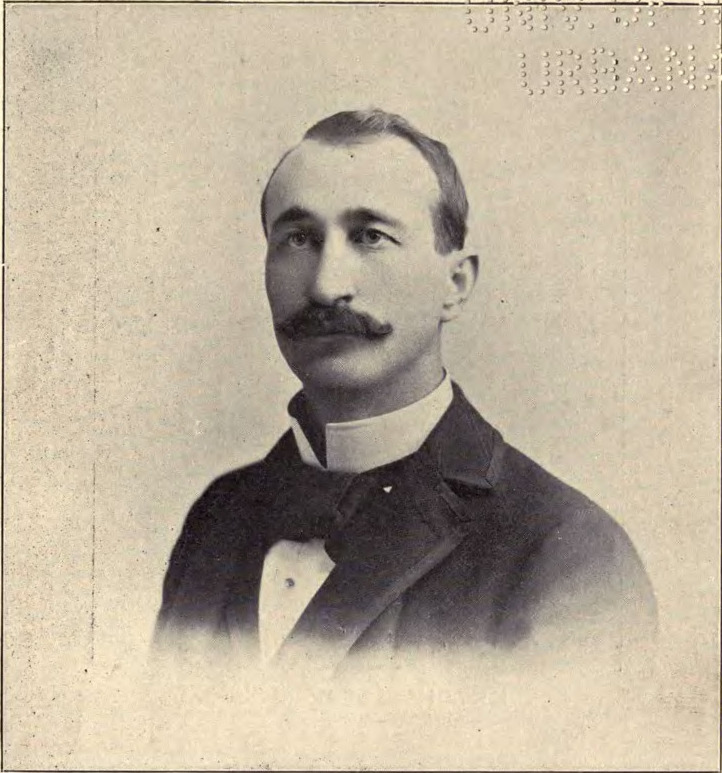
- Born: 17 February 1862
- Died: 22 September 1942 (aged 80)
- Occupation: Politician
- Position held: member of the Illinois House of Representatives, Lieutenant Governor of Illinois (1893–1897)

Joseph B. Gill (17 February 1862 – 22 September 1942) was an American politician. Between 1893 and 1897 he served as Lieutenant Governor of Illinois.

== Life ==
Joseph Gill was born on a farm near Marion, Illinois. He attended local schools and in 1884 he graduated from the Southern Illinois Normal School in Carbondale. Afterwards he studied law at the University of Michigan and in 1886 he was permitted to the bar. However he did not work in the judicial arena. Instead he started a career as a journalist in the newspaper business. Until 1893 he conducted and edited the Murphysboro Independent. He joined the Democratic Party and in 1888 he was elected to the Illinois House of Representatives, where he remained until 1892. In that year he was elected to the office of the Lieutenant Governor of Illinois. He served in this position between 10 January 1893 and 11 January 1897 when his term ended. In this function he was the deputy of Governor John Peter Altgeld. On several occasions he took over the functions of the Governor while Altgeld was absent or sick. In this time he was able to peacefully end a strike of the Mine Workers. In 1896 he did not seek reelection.

After the end of his time as Lieutenant Governor he served for a few months as Member of the State board of Arbitration. For health reasons he moved to San Bernardino, California where he became the chairperson of the Board of Trade. He was also in charge of the Highway Commission of the San Bernardino County, California. Gill also entered the banking business and became President and/or Director of various local banks. He was also involved in the lumber business. He died on 22 September 1942 in San Bernardino.

Party political offices
Preceded by Andrew Jackson Bell	Democratic nominee for Lieutenant Governor of Illinois; 1892	Succeeded by Monroe Carroll Crawford
Political offices
Preceded by Lyman Beecher Ray	Lieutenant Governor of Illinois; 1893–1897	Succeeded by William Northcott
