= Cityfront Plaza =

Plaza in Chicago, Illinois, U.S.

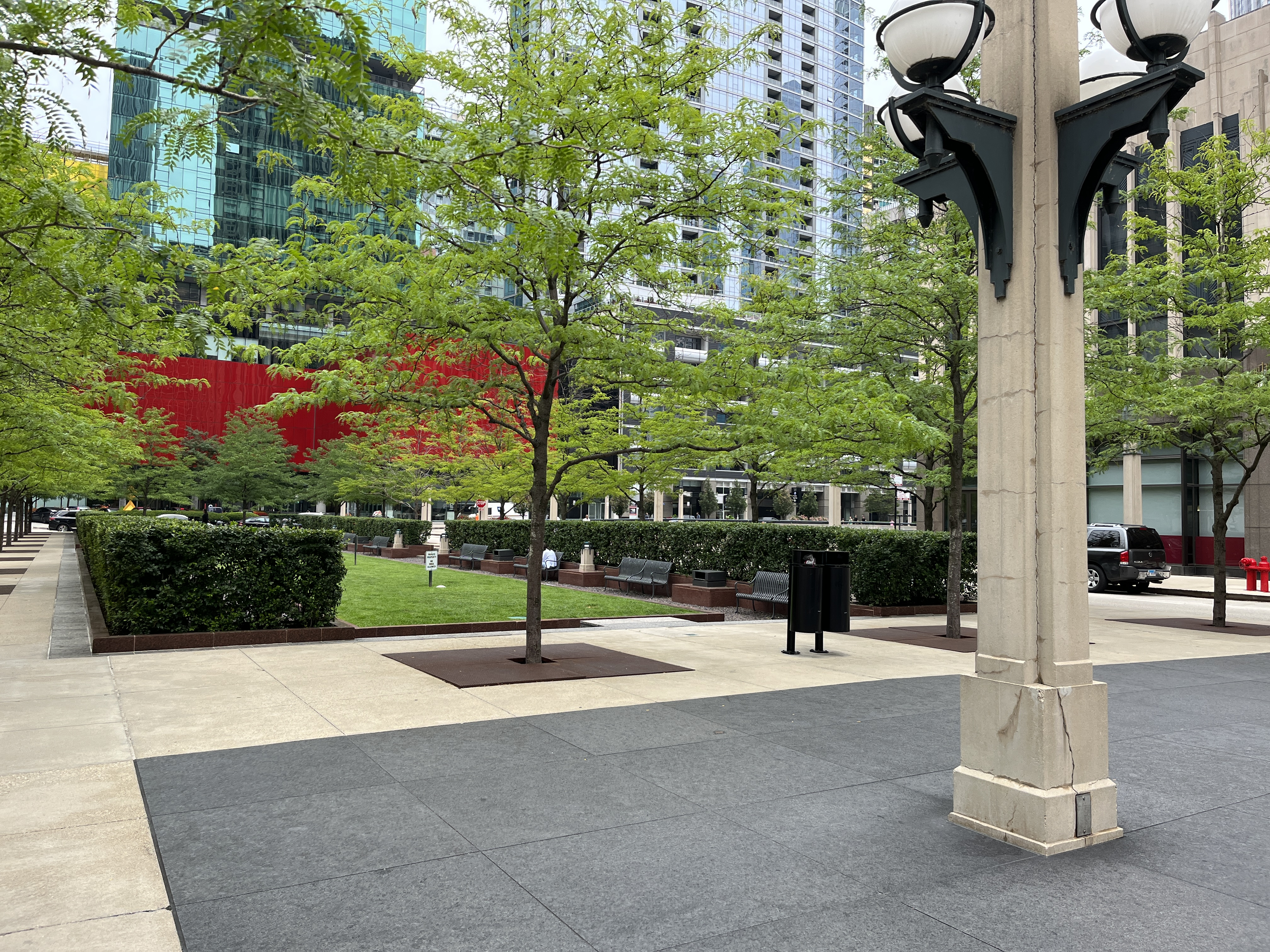
- The plaza in 2023
- Location: Chicago, Illinois, U.S.
- Location within Chicago metropolitan area
- Coordinates: 41°53′25″N 87°37′18.5″W

Cityfront Plaza is a plaza in Chicago, in the U.S. state of Illinois. It is along an elevated roadway linking North Michigan and Columbus, near NBC Tower and Pioneer Court. According to the Chicago Tribune, Cityfront Plaza "was intended to be the entryway to several buildings around it. Instead it is adjacent to several ground-level parking lots." The newspaper has also said the plaza "continues to feel like a nice little park that sits incongruously atop a road".

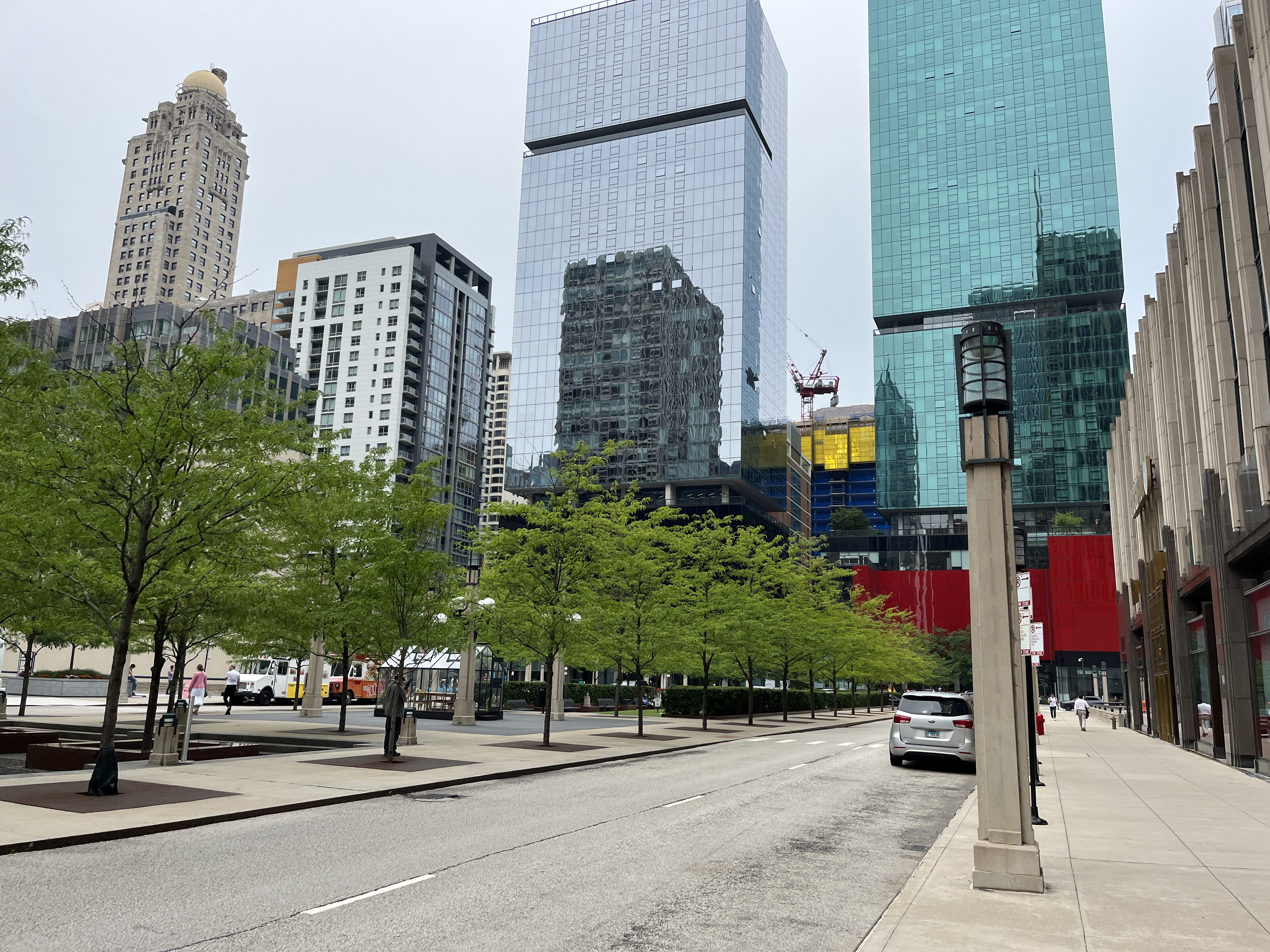

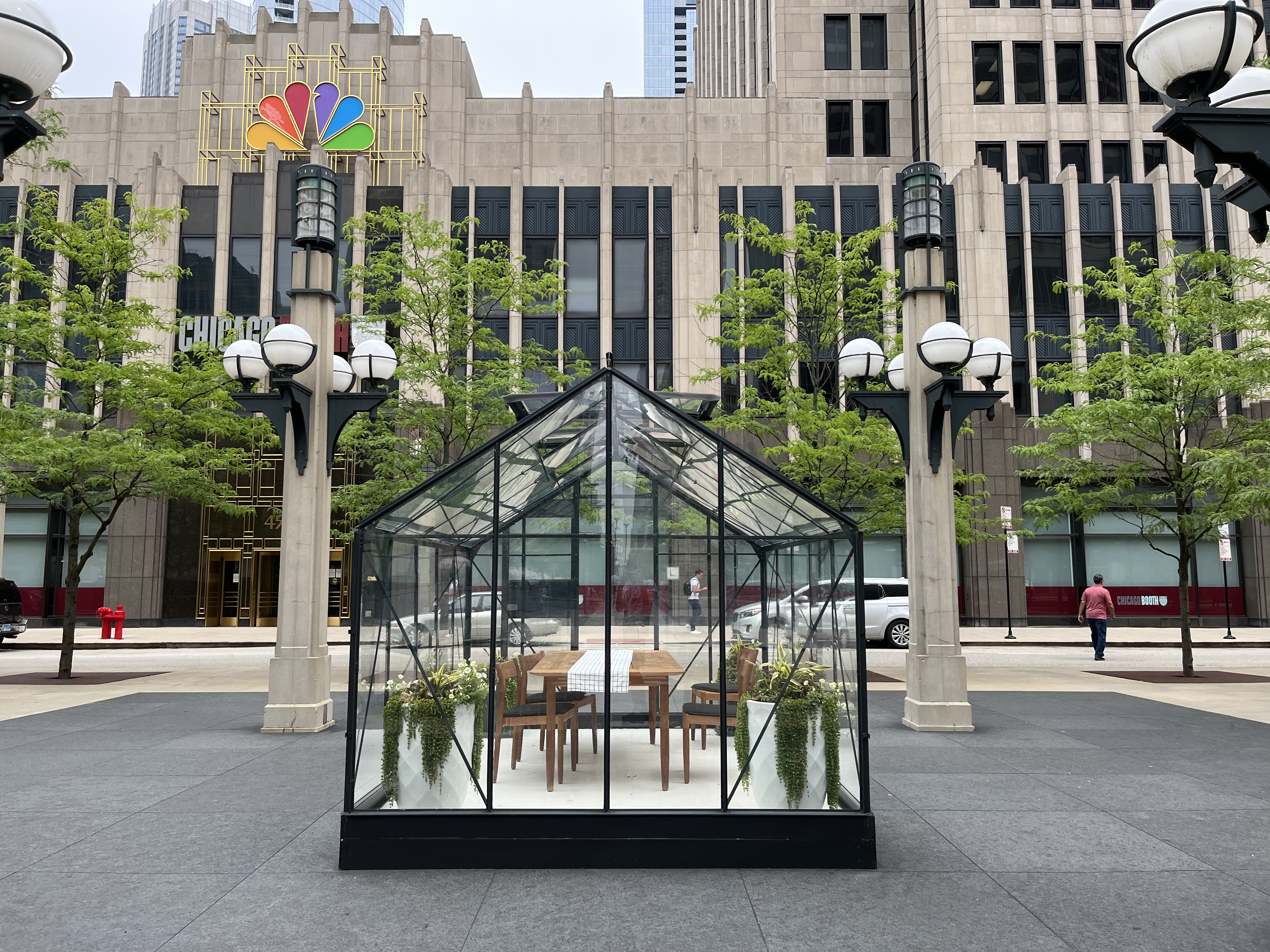
