= Stone Container Building =

Stone Container Building is the former name for two structures in Chicago:

- The London Guarantee Building at 360 North Michigan Avenue
- The Crain Communications Building at 150 North Michigan Avenue
