= Jean Baptiste Point du Sable =

Early founder of Chicago (died 1818)

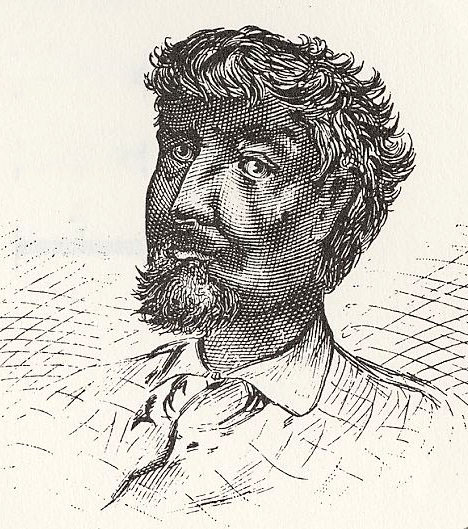
- There are no known portraits of Jean Baptiste Point du Sable made during his lifetime. This depiction is taken from History of Chicago (1884).
- Born: before 1750; Possibly Saint-Domingue, French colonial empire (now Haiti)
- Died: August 28, 1818; St. Charles, Missouri Territory, U.S.
- Occupation: Trader
- Known for: Founder of Chicago
- Spouse: Kitihawa (also known as Catherine)
- Children: 2

Jean Baptiste Point du Sable (French pronunciation: [ʒɑ̃ batist pwɛ̃ dy sɑbl]; also spelled Point de Sable, Point au Sable, Point Sable, Pointe DuSable, or Pointe du Sable; (Note: Pointe de Sable is French for 'sand point'. Point du Sable biographer John F. Swenson notes that during Point du Sable's lifetime, his surname was recorded as Point de Sable (or a variant spelling thereof). The 1936 renaming of New Wendell Phillips High School to DuSable High School established the common rendering of the surname as DuSable.) Around 1745 (Note: Milo Milton Quaife suggests, "It may reasonably be assumed that Susanne Point Sable [Point du Sable's daughter] was not less than sixteen years old when she became a bride [in 1790]. With this starting-point, we may conclude that Point Sable himself was born not later than the year 1750.") – August 28, 1818) is regarded as the founder of what would become Chicago, Illinois, United States. The site where he settled near the mouth of the Chicago River around the 1780s is memorialized as a National Historic Landmark, now located in Pioneer Court.

Point du Sable was of Black African and possibly European descent, but little else is known of his life before the 1770s. During his career, the areas where he settled and traded around the Great Lakes and in the Illinois Country changed hands several times between France, Britain, Spain and the United States. Described as handsome and well-educated, Point du Sable married a Potawatomi woman, Kitihawa, and they had two children. In 1779, during the American Revolutionary War, he was arrested by the British on suspicion of being an American Patriot sympathizer. In the early 1780s, he was transported to work for the British lieutenant-governor of Michilimackinac on a British owned estate at what is now St. Clair, Michigan.

Point du Sable is first recorded as living at the mouth of the Chicago River in a trader's journal of early 1790. By then, he had established an extensive and prosperous trading settlement in what later became the City of Chicago. He sold his Chicago River property in 1800 and moved to the river port of St. Charles, where he was licensed to run a ferry across the Missouri River. Point du Sable's role in developing the Chicago River settlement was barely recognized until the mid-20th century.

In Chicago, a school, museum, harbor, park, bridge, and road have been named in du Sable's honor.

== Biography ==
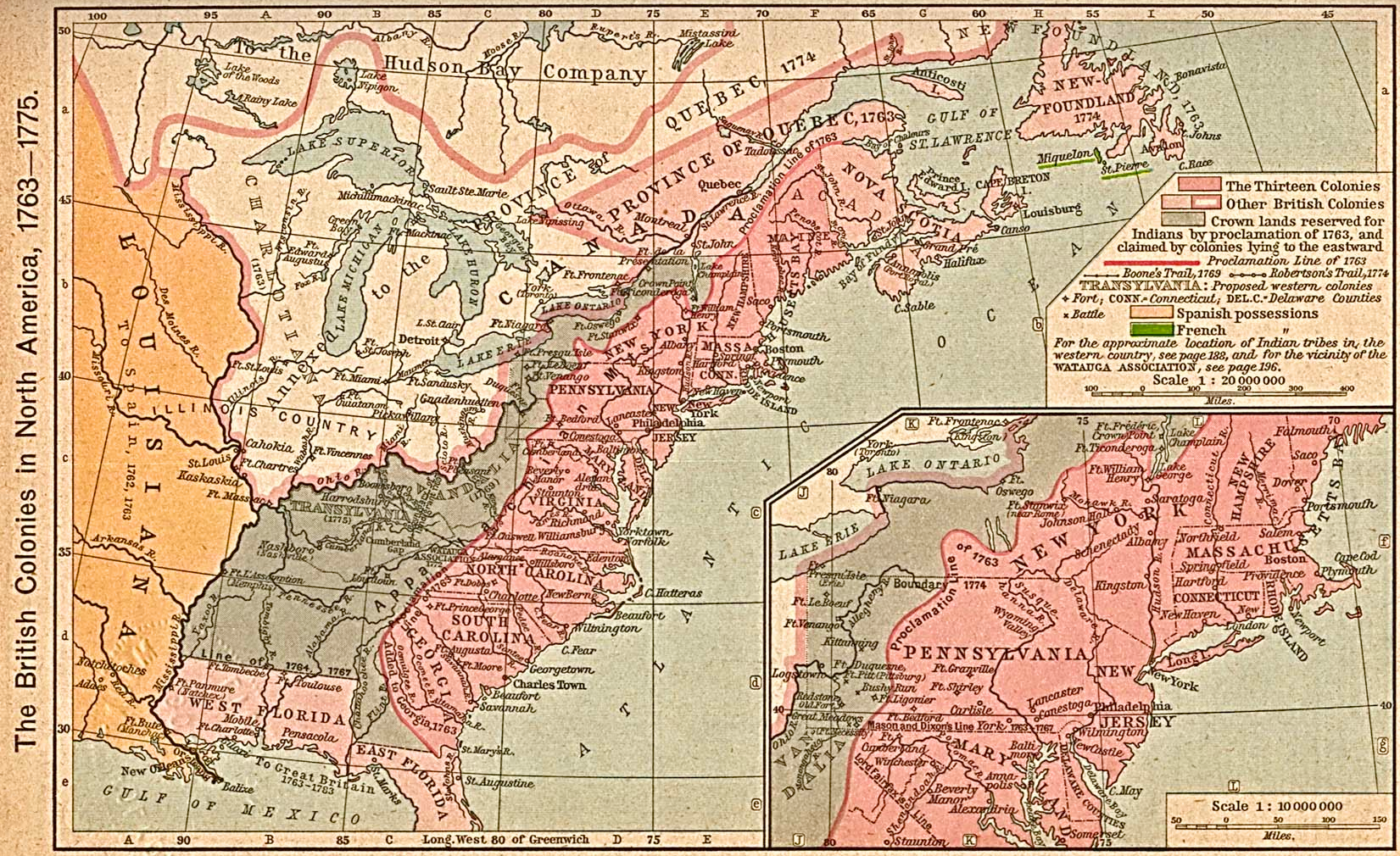
Map of eastern North America in the late 18th century, just prior to the American Revolutionary War. Point du Sable lived near Lake Michigan and the Illinois Country (center left).

=== Early life ===
There are no records of Point du Sable's life before the 1770s. Though it is known from sources during his life that he was of Black African and possibly European descent, his birth date, place of birth, and parents are unknown. Juliette Kinzie, another early pioneer of Chicago, never met Point du Sable but said in her 1856 memoir that he was "a native of St. Domingo" (the island of Hispaniola). This became generally accepted as his place of birth. Historian Milo Milton Quaife regarded Kinzie's account of Point du Sable as "largely fictitious and wholly unauthenticated", later putting forward a theory that he was of African and French-Canadian origin. A historical novel published in 1953 helped to popularize the claim that Point du Sable was born in 1745 in Saint-Marc in Saint-Domingue (which later became Haiti after its independence from the French colonial empire). If he was born outside continental North America, there are competing accounts as to whether he entered as a trader from the north through French Canada, or from the south through French Louisiana.

=== Illinois Country ===
Point du Sable married a Potawatomi woman named Kitihawa (Christianized to Catherine) on 27 October 1788, in a Catholic ceremony in Cahokia, a longtime French colonial settlement on the east side of the Mississippi River in the Illinois Country. It is likely that this couple was married earlier in the 1770s in an American Indian tradition. They had a son named Jean and a daughter named Susanne. Point du Sable supported his family as a frontier trader (voyageur or coureur des bois) and settler during a period of great upheaval for the former southern dependencies of French Canada and in the Illinois Country, where the regions changed hands several times over the course of half a century.

In a footnote to a poem titled Speech to the Western Indians, Arent DePeyster, British commandant from 1774 to 1779 at Fort Michilimackinac (a former French fort in what was then the British province of Quebec), noted that "Baptist Point de Saible" was "a handsome negro", "well educated", and "settled in Eschecagou". When he published this poem in 1813, DePeyster presented it as a speech that he had made at the village of Arbrecroche (now Harbor Springs, Michigan) on 4 July 1779. This footnote has led many scholars to assume that Point du Sable had settled in Chicago by 1779. But letters written by other traders in the late 1770s suggest that Point du Sable was at this time settled at the mouth of Trail Creek (Rivière du Chemin) at what is now Michigan City, Indiana.

In August 1779, during the American Revolutionary War, Point du Sable was arrested as a suspected American Patriot sympathizer at Trail Creek by British troops and imprisoned briefly. An officer's report following his arrest noted that Point du Sable had many friends who vouched for his good character. The following year, Point du Sable was ordered transported to the Pinery on the St. Clair River north of Detroit. From the summer of 1780 until May 1784, Point du Sable managed the Pinery, a tract of woodlands owned by British officer Lt. Patrick Sinclair, on the St. Clair River in eastern Michigan. This may have been a choice given by him from the British, offering him release from his imprisonment to manage the Pinery. Point du Sable lived with his family in a cabin at the mouth of the Pine River in what is now the city of St. Clair.

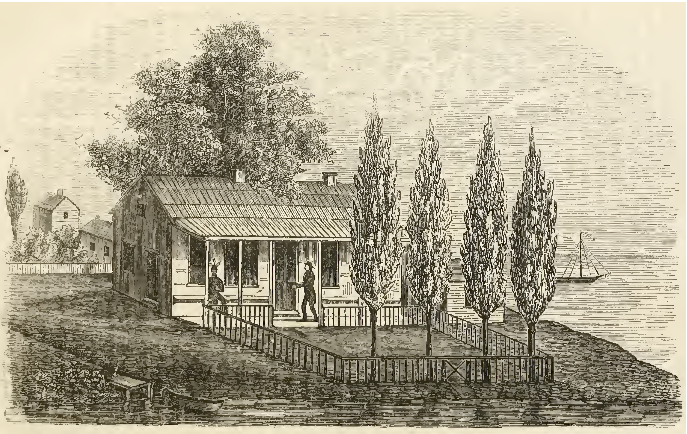
Drawing of the former home of Jean Baptiste Point du Sable in Chicago as it appeared in the early 1800s

At some time in the 1780s, after the U.S. achieved independence, Point du Sable settled on the north bank of the Chicago River close to its mouth. (Note: According to an 1892 description of the location of the house, it "stood as nearly as may be at the foot of Pine Street [now Michigan Avenue], partly upon the ground now occupied by Kirk's factory, and partly in what is now known as North Water Street, properly an extension of Kinzie Street." This location was confirmed by the recollections of John Noble, the last occupant of the house, who died in 1888.) The earliest known record of Point du Sable living in Chicago is an entry that Hugh Heward made in his journal on 10 May 1790, during a journey from Detroit across Michigan and through Illinois. Heward's party stopped at Point du Sable's house en route to the Chicago portage; they swapped their canoe for a pirogue that belonged to Point du Sable, and they bought bread, flour, and pork from him. Perrish Grignon, who visited Chicago in about 1794, described Point du Sable as a large man and wealthy trader. Point du Sable's granddaughter, Eulalie Pelletier, was born at his Chicago River settlement in 1796.

In 1800 Point du Sable sold his farm to John Kinzie's frontman, Jean La Lime, for 6,000 livres. The bill of sale, which was rediscovered in 1913 in an archive in Detroit, detailed all of the property Point du Sable owned, as well as many of his personal effects. This included a house, two barns, a horse-drawn mill, a bakehouse, a poultry house, a dairy, and a smokehouse. The house was a 22-by-40-foot (6.7 m × 12.2 m) log cabin filled with fine furniture and paintings.

=== Missouri River and burial ===
After Point du Sable sold his property in Chicago, he moved to St. Charles, west of St. Louis, which at that time was still part of Spanish Louisiana. He was commissioned by the colonial governor to operate a ferry across the Missouri River. In St. Charles, he may have lived for a time with his son, and later with his granddaughter's family. Late in life, he may have sought public or charitable assistance. He died on 28 August 1818 and was buried in an unmarked grave in St. Charles Borromeo Cemetery. His entry in the parish burial register does not mention his origins, parents, or relatives; it simply describes him as nègre (French for negro).

The St. Charles Borromeo Cemetery was moved twice in the 19th century. Oral tradition and records of the Archdiocese of St. Louis suggested that Point du Sable's remains were also moved. On 12 October 1968, the Illinois Sesquicentennial Commission erected a granite marker at the site believed to be Point du Sable's grave in the third St. Charles Borromeo Cemetery.

In 2002 an archaeological investigation of the grave site was initiated by the African Scientific Research Institute at the University of Illinois at Chicago. Researchers using a combination of ground-penetrating radar, surveys, and excavation of a 9-by-9-foot (2.7 m × 2.7 m) area did not find any evidence of any burials at the supposed grave site, leading the archaeologists to conclude that Point du Sable's remains may not have been reinterred from one of the two previous cemeteries.

== Theories and legends ==
=== Origins ===
Though there is little historical evidence regarding Point du Sable's life before the 1770s, there are several theories and legends that give accounts of his early life. Writing in 1933, Quaife identified a French immigrant to Canada, Pierre Dandonneau, who acquired the title "Sieur de Sable" and whose descendants were known by both the names Dandonneau and Du Sable. Quaife was unable to find a direct link to Point du Sable, but he identified descendants of Pierre Dandonneau as living around the Great Lakes region in Detroit, Mackinac, and St. Joseph. He speculated that Point du Sable's father may have been a member of this family, while his mother was likely an enslaved woman.

In 1951, Joseph Jeremie, a native of Haiti, published a pamphlet in which he said he was the great-grandson of Point du Sable. Based on family recollections and tombstone inscriptions, he claimed that Point du Sable was born in Saint-Marc in what was then Saint Domingue, studied in France, and returned to the island to deal in coffee before traveling to French Louisiana. Historian and Point du Sable biographer John F. Swenson has called these claims "elaborate, undocumented assertions ... in a fanciful biography".

==== Fiction ====
In 1953, Shirley Graham drew from the work of Quaife and Jeremie in a historical novel about Point du Sable. She described it as "not accurate history nor pure fiction", but rather "an imaginative interpretation of all the known facts". This book presented Point du Sable as the son of the mate on a pirate ship, the Black Sea Gull, and a freedwoman called Suzanne. Despite lack of evidence and the continued debate about Point du Sable's early life, parentage, and birthplace, this popular story has been repeated and widely presented as being definitive.

=== Peoria ===
In 1815, a land claim that had been submitted by Nicholas Jarrot to the land commissioners at Kaskaskia, Illinois Territory, was approved. In the claim Jarrot asserted that a "Jean Baptiste Poinstable" had been "head of a family at Peoria in the year 1783, and before and after that year", and that he "had a house built and cultivated land between the Old Fort and the new settlement in the year 1780". This document has been taken by Quaife and other historians as evidence that Point du Sable lived at Peoria on the Illinois River prior to going north to settle in Chicago. However, other records demonstrate that Point du Sable was living and working under the British at the Pinery in Michigan in the early 1780s. The Kaskaskia land commissioners identified many fraudulent land claims, including two previously submitted in the name of Point du Sable. Nicholas Jarrot, the claimant, was involved in many false claims, and Swenson suggests that this one was also fraudulent, made without Point du Sable's knowledge. Although perhaps in conflict with some of the above information, other historical records suggest that Point du Sable bought land in Peoria from J. B. Maillet on 13 March 1773 and sold it to Isaac Darneille in 1783, before he became the first "permanent" resident of Chicago.

=== Departure from Chicago ===
Point du Sable left Chicago in 1800. He sold his property to Jean La Lime, a trader from Quebec, and moved to the Missouri River valley, at that time part of Spanish Louisiana. The reason for his departure is unknown. By 1804, John Kinzie, another early Chicago settler from Quebec, had bought the former du Sable house. Kinzie's daughter-in-law, Juliette Magill Kinzie, suggested in her 1852 memoir that "perhaps he [du Sable] was disgusted at not being elected to a similar dignity [great chief] by the Pottowattamies".

In 1874, Nehemiah Matson elaborated on this story, claiming that Point du Sable was a slave from Virginia who had moved with his master to Lexington, Kentucky, in 1790. According to Matson, Point du Sable became a zealous Catholic in order to convince a Jesuit missionary to declare him chief of the local Native Americans, but after they refused to accept him as their chief, he left Chicago. Quaife dismisses both of these stories as being fictional.

In her 1953 novel, Graham suggests that Point du Sable left Chicago because he was angered that the US government wanted him to buy the land on which he had lived and called his own for the previous two decades. The 1795 Treaty of Greenville, which ended the Northwest Indian War, and the subsequent westward migration of Native Americans away from the Chicago area might also have influenced his decision. (Note: The Treaty of Greenville ceded Native-American rights to a substantial amount of territory in what is now the Midwest, including "[o]ne piece of land six miles square, at the mouth of Chikago river".)

== Legacy and honors ==
The French came to the North American mid-continent region in the 17th century. Though probably not the first Europeans to visit the area, Louis Jolliet and Jacques Marquette were the first noted in the written record to have crossed the Chicago Portage and traveled along the Chicago River, as part of their 1673 Mississippi Valley expedition. (Note: Jolliet and Marquette did not report any Native Americans living near the Chicago River area at this time, though archaeologists have since discovered numerous village sites elsewhere in the Chicago area.) Over the following years, visits by the French continued and occasional intermittent posts were established, including those by René LaSalle, Henri de Tonti, Pierre Liette and the four-year Mission of the Guardian Angel. Point du Sable's residence in the 1780s is recognized as the establishment of the first continuous settlement, which ultimately grew to become the city of Chicago. He is therefore widely regarded as the first permanent non-Indigenous settler of Chicago and has been given the appellation "Founder of Chicago".

=== Memorials ===
[Point du Sable] is not yet honored in his own house (which Chicagoans call the "Kinzie House") or on his own land. No street bears his name and, save for the high school, he has no monument. Cadillac is honored in Detroit, Pitt in Pittsburgh, Cleveland in Cleveland – but the father of Chicago has no street or statue of stone to call his own.

— Ebony, December 1963.

By the 1850s, historians of Chicago recognized Point du Sable as the city's earliest non-Native permanent resident, but for a long time the city did not honor him in the same manner as other pioneers. Point du Sable was generally forgotten during the 19th century; instead, the Scots-Irish trader John Kinzie from Quebec, who had bought his property, was often credited for the settlement. A plaque was erected by the city in 1913 at the corner of Kinzie and Pine Streets (later renamed Michigan Avenue) to commemorate the Kinzie homestead. In the planning stages of the 1933–1934 Century of Progress International Exposition, several African-American groups campaigned for Point du Sable to be honored at the fair. At the time, few Chicagoans had even heard of Point du Sable, and the World's Fair organizers presented the 1803 construction of Fort Dearborn as the city's historical beginning. The campaign was partially successful, however, with a replica of Point du Sable's cabin being presented as part of the "background of the history of Chicago".

In 1965, a plaza called Pioneer Court was built on the site of Point du Sable's homestead as part of the construction of the Equitable Life Assurance Society of America building. The Jean Baptiste Point Du Sable Homesite was designated as a National Historic Landmark on 11 May 1976 as a site deemed to have "exceptional value to the nation". Pioneer Court is located at what is now 401 N. Michigan Avenue in the Michigan–Wacker Historic District. At this site in 2009, the City of Chicago and a private donor, Haitian-born Lesly Benodin, erected a large bronze bust of Point du Sable by Chicago-born sculptor Erik Blome.

In October 2010, the Michigan Avenue Bridge was renamed DuSable Bridge. Previously, a small street with the alternative spelling De Saible Street had been named after him. In 2021, Lake Shore Drive in Chicago was renamed in honor of Point du Sable.

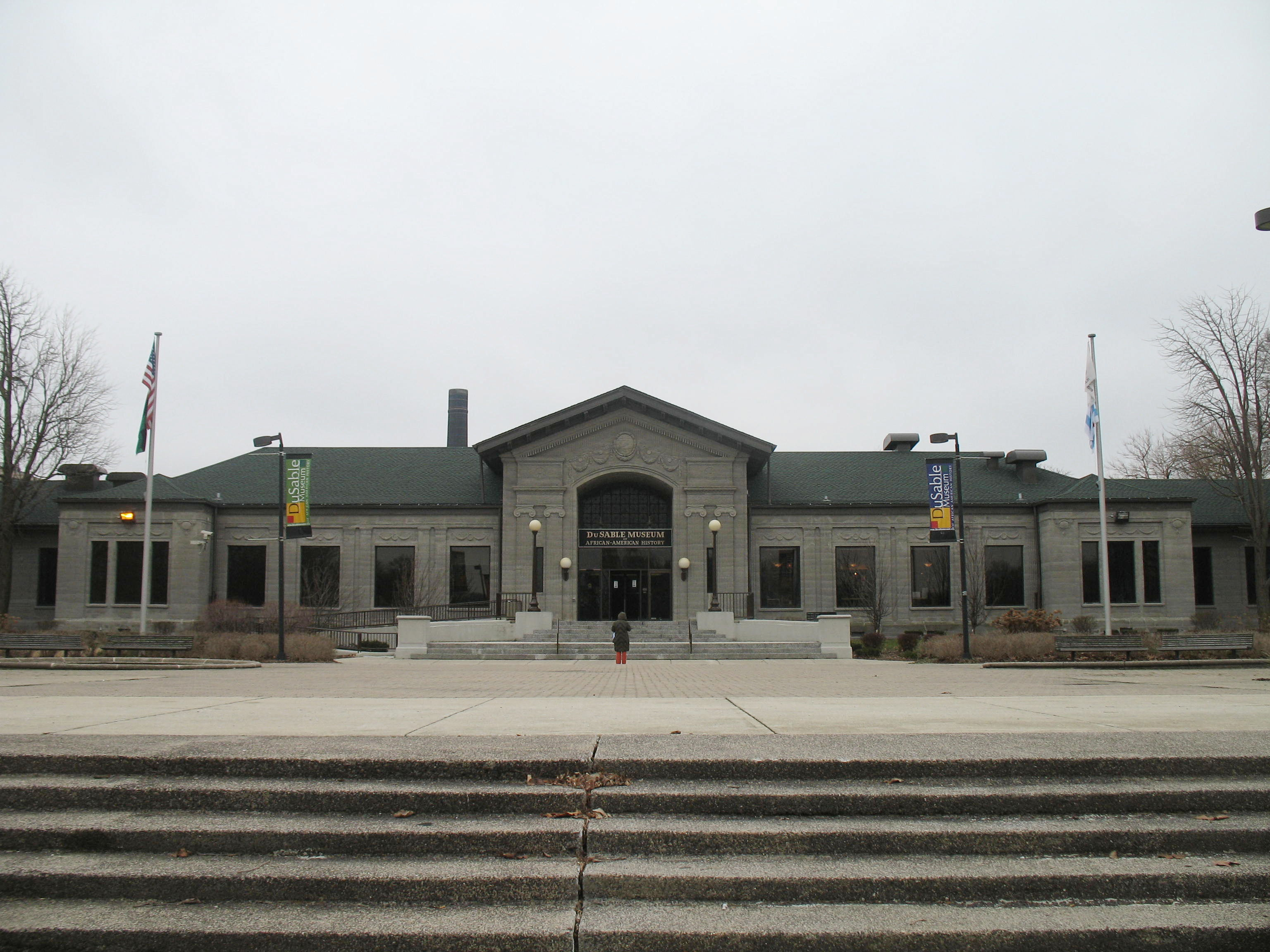
The DuSable Museum in Washington Park

Several institutions have been named in his honor. DuSable High School opened in Bronzeville, Chicago, in 1934. The DuSable campus today houses the Daniel Hale Williams Prep School of Medicine and the Bronzeville Scholastic Institute. Margaret Taylor-Burroughs, a prominent African-American artist and writer, taught at the school for twenty-three years. She and her husband co-founded the DuSable Black History Museum and Education Center, located on Chicago's South Side. DuSable Hall, built in 1968, on the campus of Northern Illinois University is also named for him.

DuSable Harbor is located in the heart of downtown Chicago at the foot of Randolph Street. Directly across the Chicago River from the harbor, DuSable Park is a 3.24-acre (1.31 ha) urban park in Chicago currently awaiting redevelopment. The project was originally announced in 1987 by Mayor Harold Washington; following years of remediation of the site initial development began in early 2024. A park is also named after Point du Sable in St. Charles, his other notable place of residence. The US Postal Service honored Point du Sable with the issue of a Black Heritage Series 22-cent postage stamp on 20 February 1987.

== See also ==
- History of Chicago
- List of African-American firsts
- Antoine Ouilmette

== Notes and references ==
=== References cited ===
- Baumann, Timothy E. (December 2005). "The Du Sable Grave Project in St. Charles, Missouri" (PDF). The Missouri Archaeologist. 66: 59–76. Archived from the original (PDF) on 21 October 2013.
- DePeyster, Arent Schuyler (1813). Miscellanies. Dumfries and Galloway Courier Office.
- Graham, Shirley (1953). Jean Baptiste Pointe De Sable Founder Of Chicago. Julian Messner.
- Kinzie, Juliette (1856). Wau-Bun, the "Early Day" in the North-West. Derby and Jackson.
- Meehan, Thomas A. (1963). "Jean Baptiste Point du Sable, the First Chicagoan". Journal of the Illinois State Historical Society. 56 (3): 439–453. JSTOR 40190620.
- Pacyga, Dominic A. (2009). Chicago: A Biography. University of Chicago Press. ISBN 978-0226644318.
- Pioneer Society of the State of Michigan (1886). Report of the Pioneer Society of the State of Michigan. Vol. 9. Wynkoop Hallenbeck Crawford Company.
- Quaife, Milo Milton (1913). Chicago and the Old Northwest, 1673–1835. The University of Chicago Press.
- Quaife, Milo Milton (1933). Checagou From Indian Wigwam To Modern City 1673–1835. The University of Chicago Press.
- Reed, Christopher R. (June 1991). "'In the Shadow of Fort Dearborn': Honoring De Saible at the Chicago World's Fair of 1933–1934". Journal of Black Studies. 21 (4): 398–413. doi:10.1177/002193479102100402. JSTOR 2784685. S2CID 145599165.
