= Jean Baptiste Point Du Sable Homesite =

- U.S. National Register of Historic Places
- U.S. National Historic Landmark
- U.S. Historic district – Contributing property
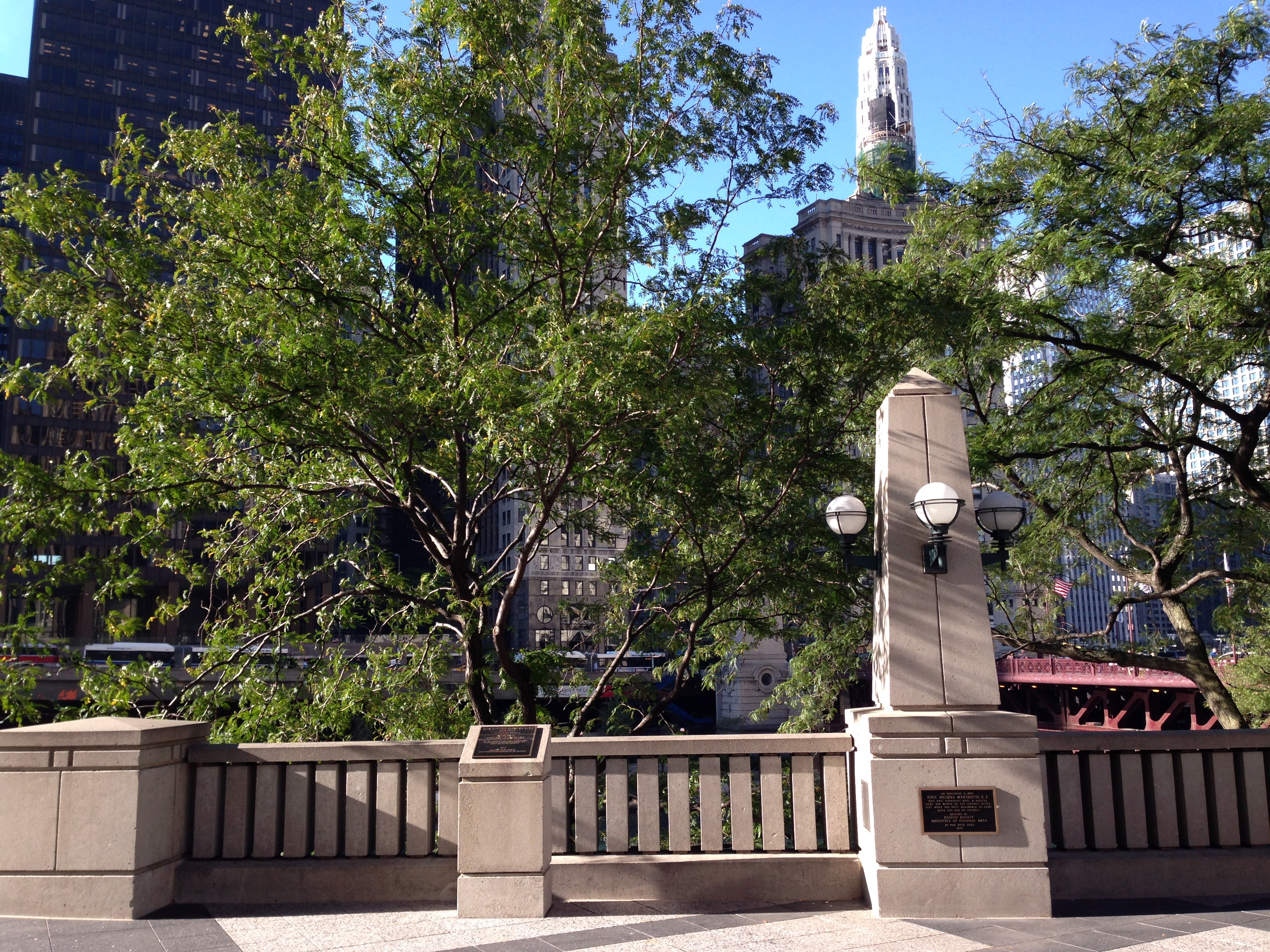

- Location within Chicago metropolitan area Location within Illinois Location within the United States
- Location: Pioneer Court, Chicago, IL
- Coordinates: 41°53′22.78″N 87°37′24.28″W
- Area: about 1 acre (0.40 ha)
- Built: 1779
- Part of: Michigan–Wacker Historic District (ID78001124)
- NRHP reference No.: 76000690

Significant dates
- Added to NRHP: May 11, 1976
- Designated NHL: May 11, 1976

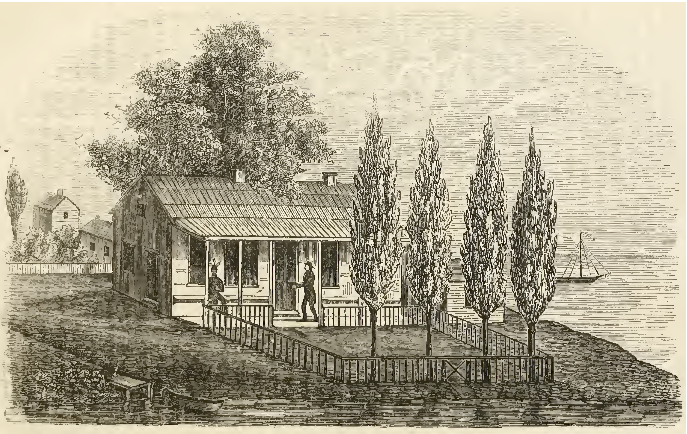
Drawing of the former home of Jean Baptiste Point du Sable in Chicago as it appeared in the early 1800s

The Jean Baptiste Point Du Sable Homesite is the location where, around the 1780s, Jean Baptiste Point du Sable located his home and extensive trading post. This home is generally considered to be the first permanent, non-native residence in Chicago, Illinois. A National Historic Landmark, the site of Point du Sable's homestead is now partially occupied by and commemorated in Pioneer Court, off DuSable Bridge at 401 N. Michigan Avenue in the Near North Side community area of Chicago, Illinois.

== History ==
Point du Sable likely settled near the mouth of the Chicago River sometime around the 1780s and sold the property in 1800. He lived here with his wife, Kitihawa, and children. The 1800 bill of sale was rediscovered in 1913 in an archive in Detroit, Michigan. The property included a house, two barns, a horse drawn mill, a bakehouse, a poultry house, a dairy, and a smokehouse. Their house was a 22-by-40-foot (6.7 m × 12.2 m) log cabin filled with fine furniture and paintings.

Following Point du Sable's departure from Chicago, the home became the property of John Kinzie. In 1834 the land owned by Kinzie was platted and sold. The "Kinzie addition" to Chicago, which is assumed to be coterminous with Point du Sable's estate extended from the banks of the Chicago River north to Chicago Avenue, and from State Street east to Lake Michigan.

== Monument ==
A commemorative plaque, struck in 1937, was installed on a marble block at Pioneer Court after its 1965 dedication. It reads, "KINZIE MANSION / Near this site stood Kinzie Mansion, / 1784-1832, home of Pointe Du Saible, / Le Mai, and John Kinzie, Chicago's / "first civilian," here was born in 1805, / the city's first white child Ellen Marion Kinzie". While the plaque is correct that Ellen Marion Kinzie was the first white child born in the city, Du Sable's granddaughter, Eulalie Pelletier, was the first non-native to be born in the city, in 1796.

Pioneer Court was listed on the National Register of Historic Places and listed as a National Historic Landmark on May 11, 1976. At this site in 2009 the City of Chicago and a private donor erected a large bronze bust of Point du Sable by Chicago-born sculptor Erik Blome. In October 2010 the adjacent Michigan Avenue Bridge was renamed DuSable Bridge in honor of Point du Sable.

== See also ==
- List of National Historic Landmarks in Illinois
- National Register of Historic Places listings in Central Chicago
