= Kitihawa Point du Sable =

Early founder of Chicago

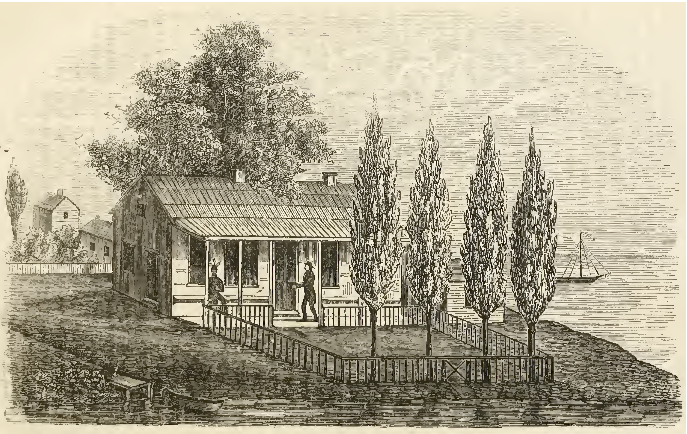
The house built by the Point du Sables, close to the mouth of the Chicago River, as it appeared when owned by the Kinzie family in the early 1800s

Kitihawa Point Du Sable (also known by her Christian name, Catherine) was a Potawatomi woman who, with her husband Jean Baptiste Point du Sable, established the first permanent settlement in what is now the city of Chicago. By the late 1700s, Kitihawa and her husband had set up their farm and trading post near the mouth of the Chicago River and Lake Michigan.

== Biography ==
There are no known records of Kitihawa's life before her marriage to Jean Baptiste. Kitihawa and her husband were married in the 1770s in a Potawatomi ceremony, followed by a Catholic ceremony on October 27, 1788, in Cahokia, Illinois. Kitihawa and Jean Baptiste had two children, Jean Baptiste Point du Sable Jr., and Suzanne.

== Representations in arts, entertainment, and media ==
- A December 2019 article in the Chicago Tribune mentions a proposal to rename Lake Shore Drive for Jean Baptiste Point du Sable. The article suggests rethinking the history of the city and considering the centuries that Native American people used the area as a trading post -- and renaming Lake Shore Drive for Kitihawa instead.
- In August 2019, Floating Museum created an art installation called "Founders," which features Kitihawa, her husband, Jean Baptiste, and a child. The goal of the piece is to bring attention to the fact that Chicago was originally founded by a Haitian man and a Potawatomi woman. As part of this installation, the poem "Kitihawa Speaks," written by Osage poet Elise Paschen, was displayed in CTA Greenline cars.
- A photographic art exhibit called "Kitihawa's Chandelier" by Nicholas Henry, "honors the historical, cultural and racial fusion of an African and Native American."
