= DuSable Bridge =

Bridge in Chicago, Illinois

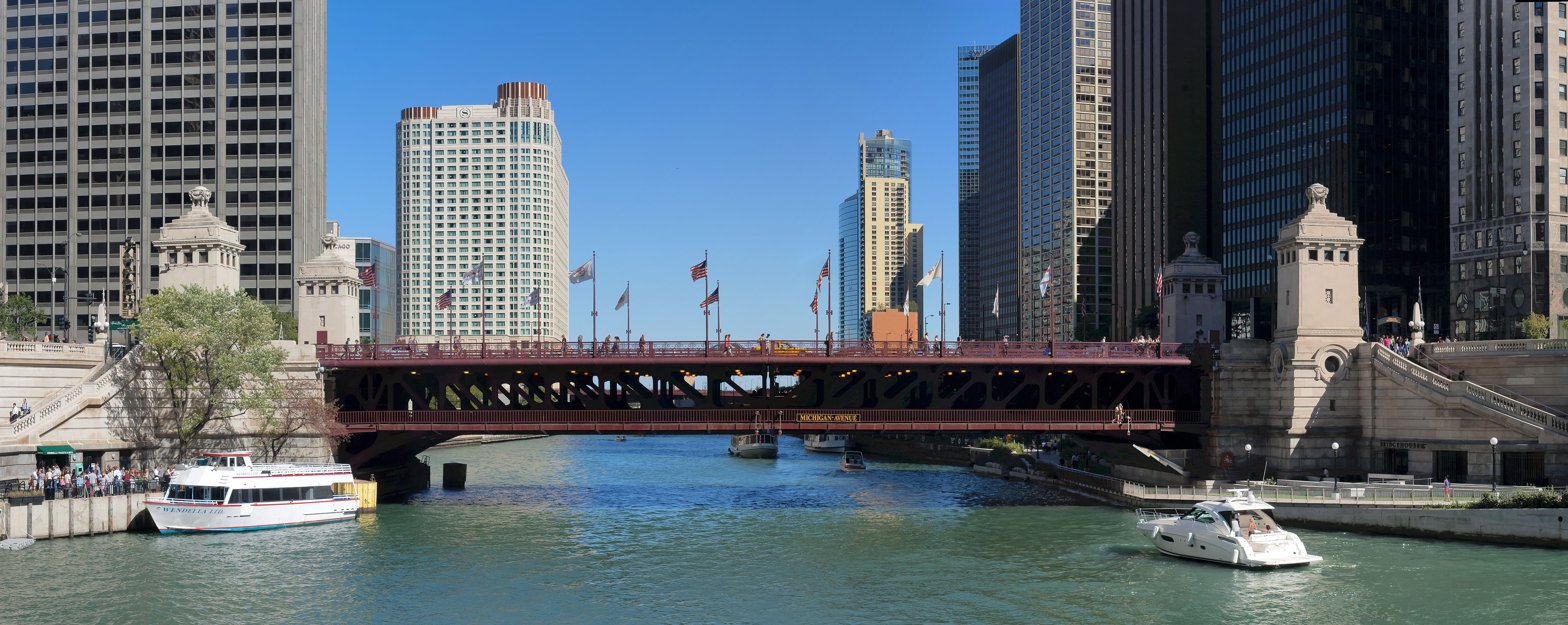
- DuSable (Michigan Avenue) Bridge viewed from the west
- Coordinates: 41°53′19.9″N 87°37′27.7″W
- Carries: Michigan Avenue
- Crosses: Chicago River
- Locale: Chicago
- Heritage status: Chicago Landmark
- ID number: 000016612026812

Characteristics
- Design: Double-leaf, double-deck, fixed counterweight, trunnion bascule bridge
- Total length: 399 feet (122 m)
- Width: 91.75 feet (27.97 m)
- Longest span: 256 feet (78 m) between trunnions 220 feet (67 m) between piers
- Clearance below: 16 feet (4.9 m)

History
- Designer: Bureau of Engineering, Chicago Department of Public Works
- Construction start: April 15, 1918
- Construction end: 1920
- Opened: May 14, 1920

Statistics
- Daily traffic: 37900 (upper deck); 11700 (lower deck)

Location
- Interactive map of DuSable Bridge

The DuSable Bridge (formerly the Michigan Avenue Bridge) is a bascule bridge that carries Michigan Avenue across the main stem of the Chicago River in downtown Chicago, Illinois, United States. The bridge was proposed in the early 20th century as part of a plan to link Grant Park (downtown) and Lincoln Park (uptown) with a grand boulevard. Construction of the bridge started in 1918, it opened to traffic in 1920, and decorative work was completed in 1928. The bridge provides passage for vehicles and pedestrians on two levels. An example of a fixed trunnion bascule bridge (which is also known as a "Chicago style bascule bridge"), it may be raised to allow tall ships and boats to pass underneath. The bridge is included in the Michigan–Wacker Historic District and has been designated as a Chicago Landmark.

The location is significant in the early history of Chicago, connecting on the north near the 1780s and 1790s homestead site of Jean Baptiste Point du Sable and on the south the early 19th century site of Fort Dearborn. Events from the city's past are commemorated with sculptures and plaques on the bridge, and exhibits in the McCormick Bridgehouse & Chicago River Museum—housed in one of the bridge tender houses—detail the history of the Chicago River.

== Location ==
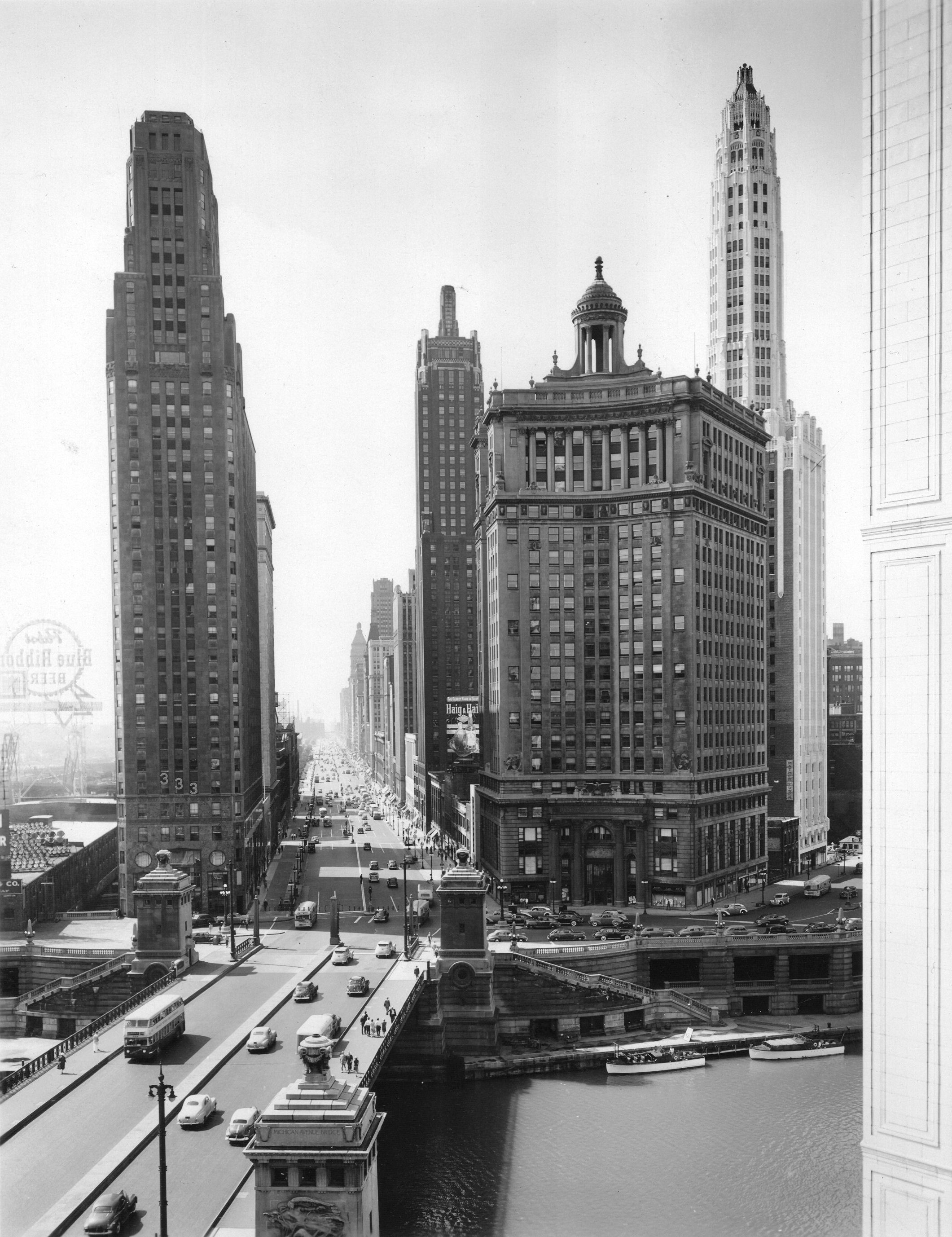
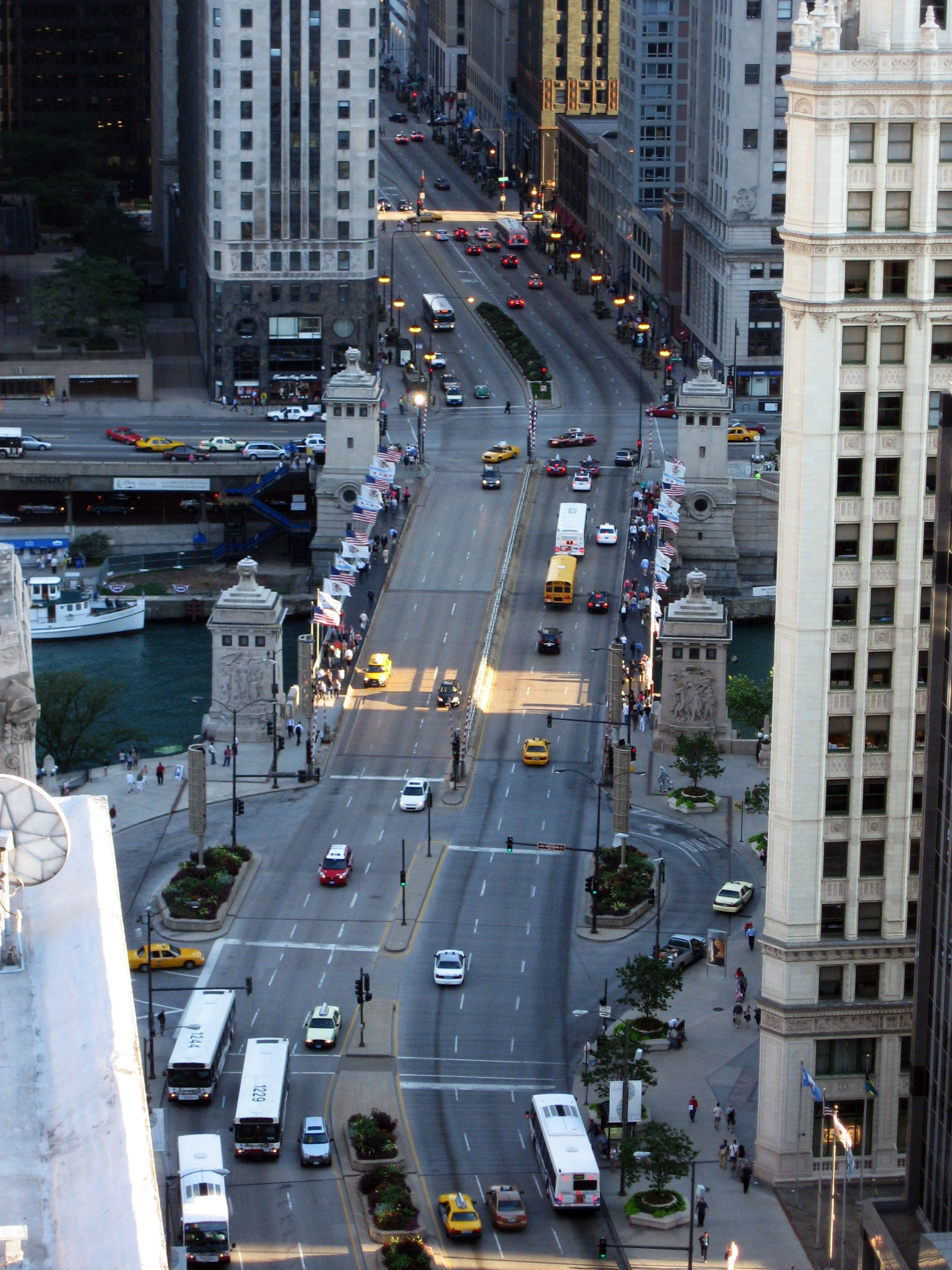
Aerial view of the bridge, looking south along Michigan Avenue, in 1945 (left) and 2008 (right)

The Michigan Avenue Bridge has a north–south orientation, spanning the main stem of the Chicago River between the Near North Side and Loop community areas of Chicago. Its northern portal lies at the foot of the Magnificent Mile, between the Wrigley Building and Tribune Tower. Its southern portal is at the intersection of Michigan Avenue and Wacker Drive, overlooked by the London Guarantee Building and 333 North Michigan. The neighboring bridges are Columbus Drive Bridge to the east and Wabash Avenue Bridge to the west.

The bridge is situated in a historically significant area. The northern end of the bridge covers part of the Jean Baptiste Point Du Sable Homesite, (Note: According to an 1892 description of the location of the house, it "stood as nearly as may be at the foot of Pine Street [now Michigan Avenue], partly upon the ground now occupied by Kirk's factory, and partly in what is now known as North Water Street, properly an extension of Kinzie Street." This location was confirmed by the recollections of John Noble, the last occupant of the house, who died in 1888.) which is commemorated by a National Historic plaque in Pioneer Court. The southern half of the bridge passes over the site of Fort Dearborn, which was constructed in 1803. (Note: The south bank of the river where Fort Dearborn had stood was dredged in 1855, straightening the bend in the river and widening it at this point by about 150 feet (46 m)) The Fort is commemorated by a large relief above the entrance of the London Guarantee Building, and brass markers positioned in the sidewalks on the south side of the bridge delineate the posited outline of the original blockhouse.

== Name ==
The historical significance of the location has been used as the basis for a number of proposals to rename the bridge. In 1921 the Chicago Historical Society suggested that the bridge should be named Marquette–Joliet Bridge, and in 1939 it was proposed to rename the bridge as Fort Dearborn Bridge. These proposals were not adopted.

In October 2010, the bridge was renamed DuSable Bridge in honor of Jean Baptiste Point du Sable, Chicago's first permanent resident. A fur trader of African descent who married into the Potawatomi tribe, he established a permanent homestead and trading post near the mouth of the Chicago River in the 1780s.

== History ==
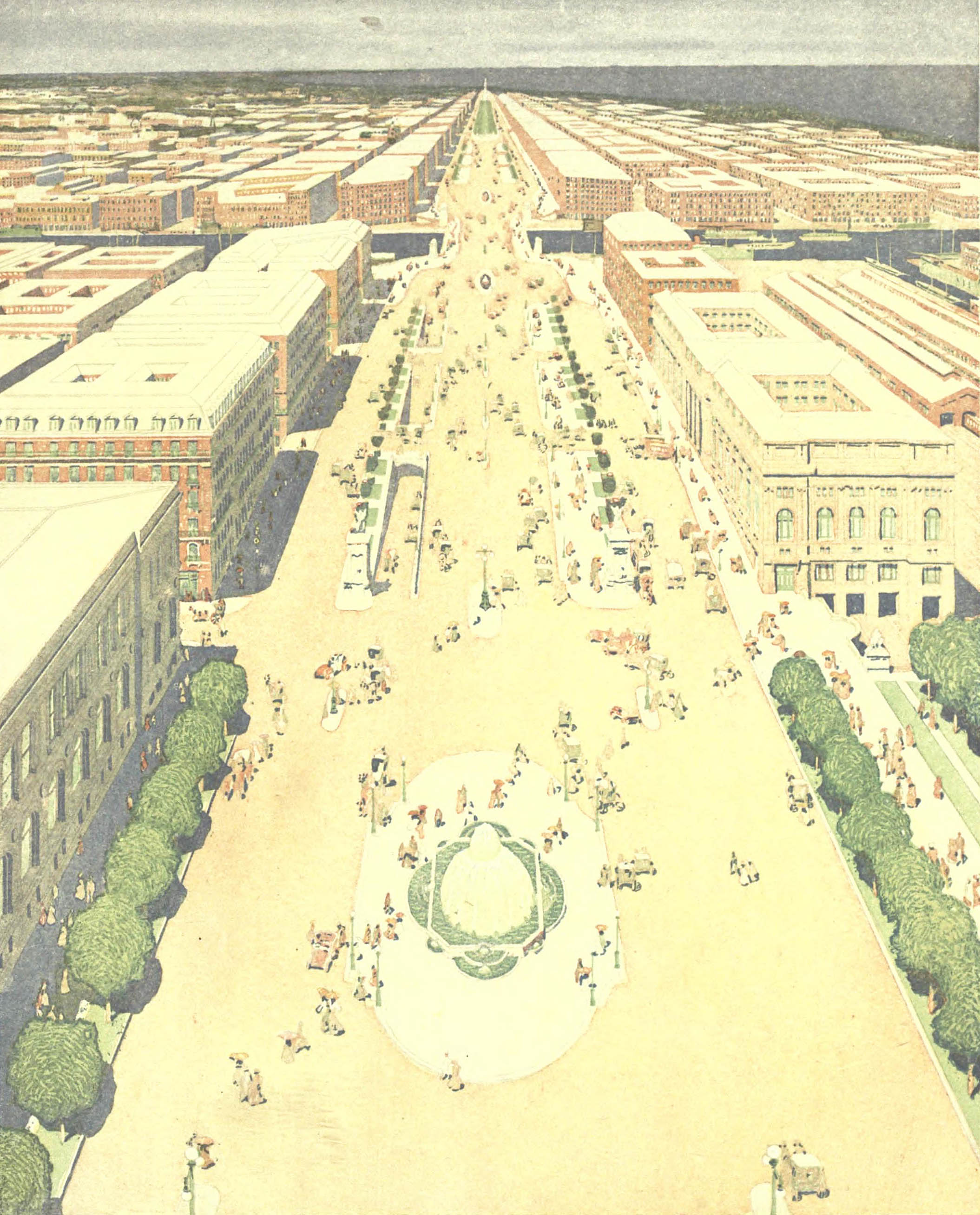
Michigan Boulevard with bridge (upper center), as proposed in Burnham & Bennett's 1909 Plan of Chicago, looking north from Grant Park

A boulevard to link the parks on Chicago's north and south sides was proposed as early as 1891. An early plan called for a tunnel to link Michigan Avenue south of the river with Pine Street (now Michigan Avenue) north of the river. In 1903 an editorial in the Chicago Tribune proposed a new bascule bridge across the river at Michigan Avenue. Other plans suggested that the bridge should be a replica of the Pont Alexandre III that spans the Seine in Paris, or that, rather than constructing an entirely new bridge, the existing Rush Street bridge should be double-decked.

Plans for the boulevard and the construction of a Michigan Avenue Bridge were further elaborated upon in Daniel Burnham's 1909 Plan of Chicago. In 1911 a plan was selected that included the widening of Michigan Avenue from Randolph Street to the river, replacing the Rush Street bridge with a new bridge at Michigan Avenue and the construction of a double-decked boulevard along Pine Street as far as Ohio Street. An ordinance to fund construction was passed in 1913, but was declared void by the Supreme Court of Illinois. A second ordinance was passed in 1914, but legal battles continued until the end of 1916. Construction finally started on April 15, 1918, and the bridge was officially opened in a ceremony on May 14, 1920.

The bridge is one of the contributing properties of the Michigan–Wacker Historic District, which was listed as on the National Register of Historic Places on November 15, 1978. It was also designated as a Chicago Landmark on October 2, 1991. In 2009 the sidewalks and railings on the bridge were replaced, and the bridge was repainted; the design of the new ornamental railings was based on the original 1920 design for the bridge's railings, replacing more utilitarian ones that had been substituted at a later date.

== Design and operation ==
Michigan Avenue Bridge is a double-leaf, double-deck, fixed counterweight, trunnion bascule bridge. It was engineered by the Chicago Department of Public Works, Bureau of Engineering; Edward H. Bennett was the consulting architect and William A. Mulcahy the chief engineer of construction. At the time of construction it was believed to be the first double-deck bridge ever built to have roadway on both levels; faster non-commercial traffic using the upper deck and slower commercial traffic that served the various industries and docks in the vicinity of the river using the lower deck.

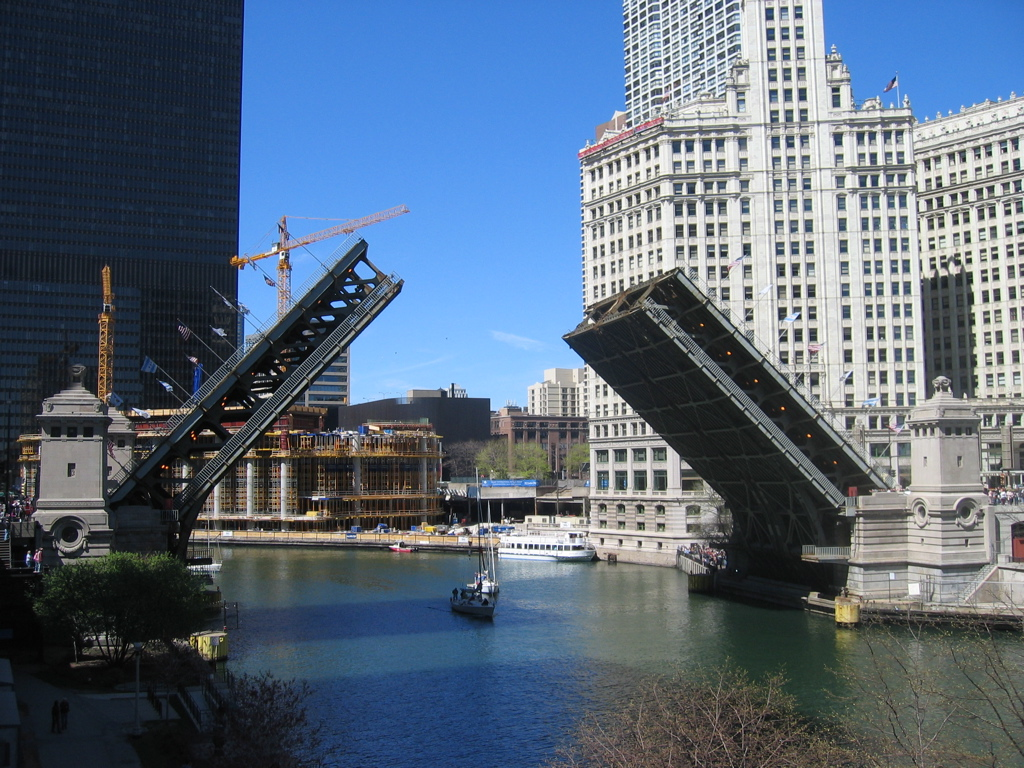
The Michigan Avenue Bridge in the 21st century is raised twice weekly in the spring and fall to allow tall craft to winter near the river and have summer moorings on Lake Michigan harbors. In the 19th century and into much the 20th century, such bridge raising or swiveling also facilitated commercial river traffic through much of the year

Each of the bridge's leaves is divided into two along the axis of the bridge such that it functions as two parallel bridges that can be operated independently of one another; at the time of construction bridges over the Chicago River were frequently struck by vessels, and this duplex arrangement allows for leaves damaged in such a collision to be opened for repair without needing to completely close the bridge to traffic. The counterweights are below the level of the lower deck and when the bridge is opened they swing down into 40-foot-deep (12 m) reinforced concrete tailpits that descend 34.5 feet (10.5 m) below the surface of the river. Each of the two tailpits is supported on nine cylindrical foundation piers. One of these piers was sunk to bedrock, 108 feet (33 m) below the river surface, the other 17 piers are sunk to the hardpan, which is 80 to 90 feet (24 to 27 m) below the water level. On the south side of the river one of the freight tunnels of the Chicago Tunnel Company had to be re-routed to make room for the tailpit. The counterweights are composed partly of concrete and partly of a concrete composite with rivet punchings; each of the four counterweights weighs 1,595 short tons (1,447 t). The Michigan Avenue Bridge is made of steel. The bridge can carry about 30,000 people daily.

The bridge abutments and the facing of the bridge tender houses are made of Bedford stone. There are four bridge tender houses: the northwest and southeast bridgehouses house the controls for operating the bridge; the northeast and southwest bridgehouses are purely decorative. Two 108 horsepower (81 kW) motors open and close each of the 3,750-short-ton (3,400 t) bridge leaves. Originally the bridge was staffed 24 hours a day, and opened up to 3,000 times a year to allow ships through, but since the 1970s bridge lifting has been scheduled in the spring and fall, when the bridge is raised twice weekly to allow sailboats to pass between Lake Michigan and inland boat yards where they are stored for the winter.

== Decoration ==
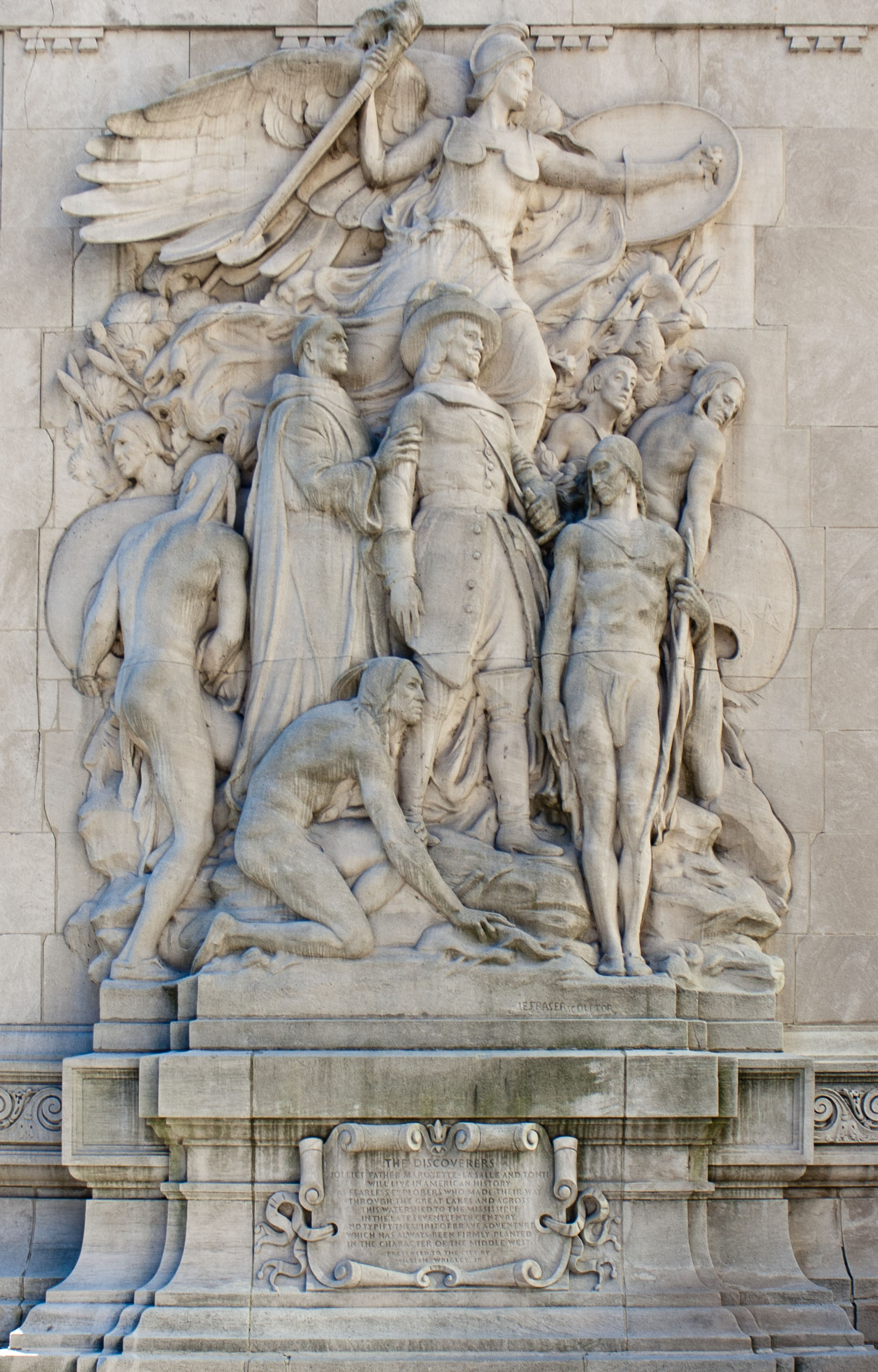
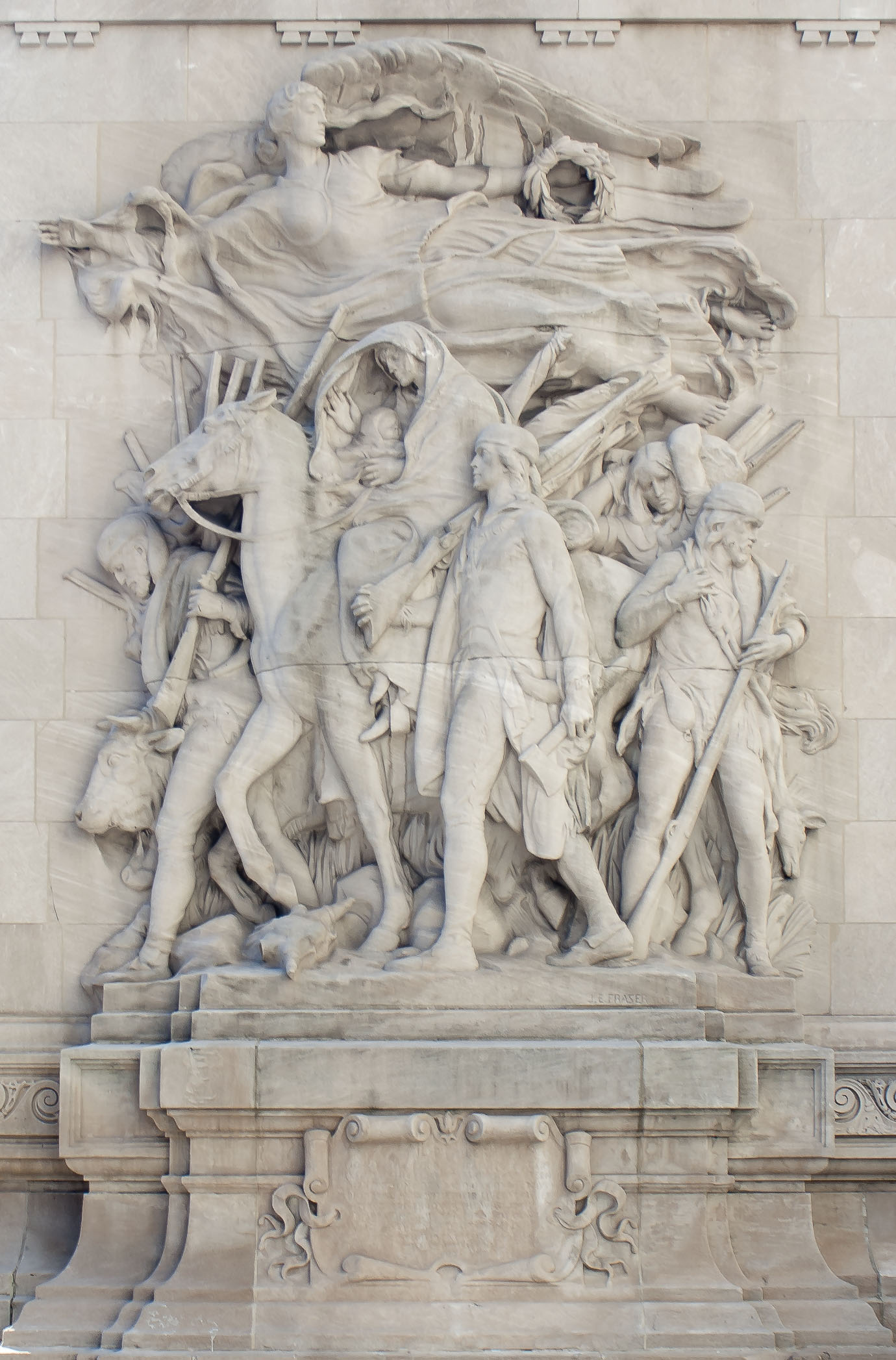
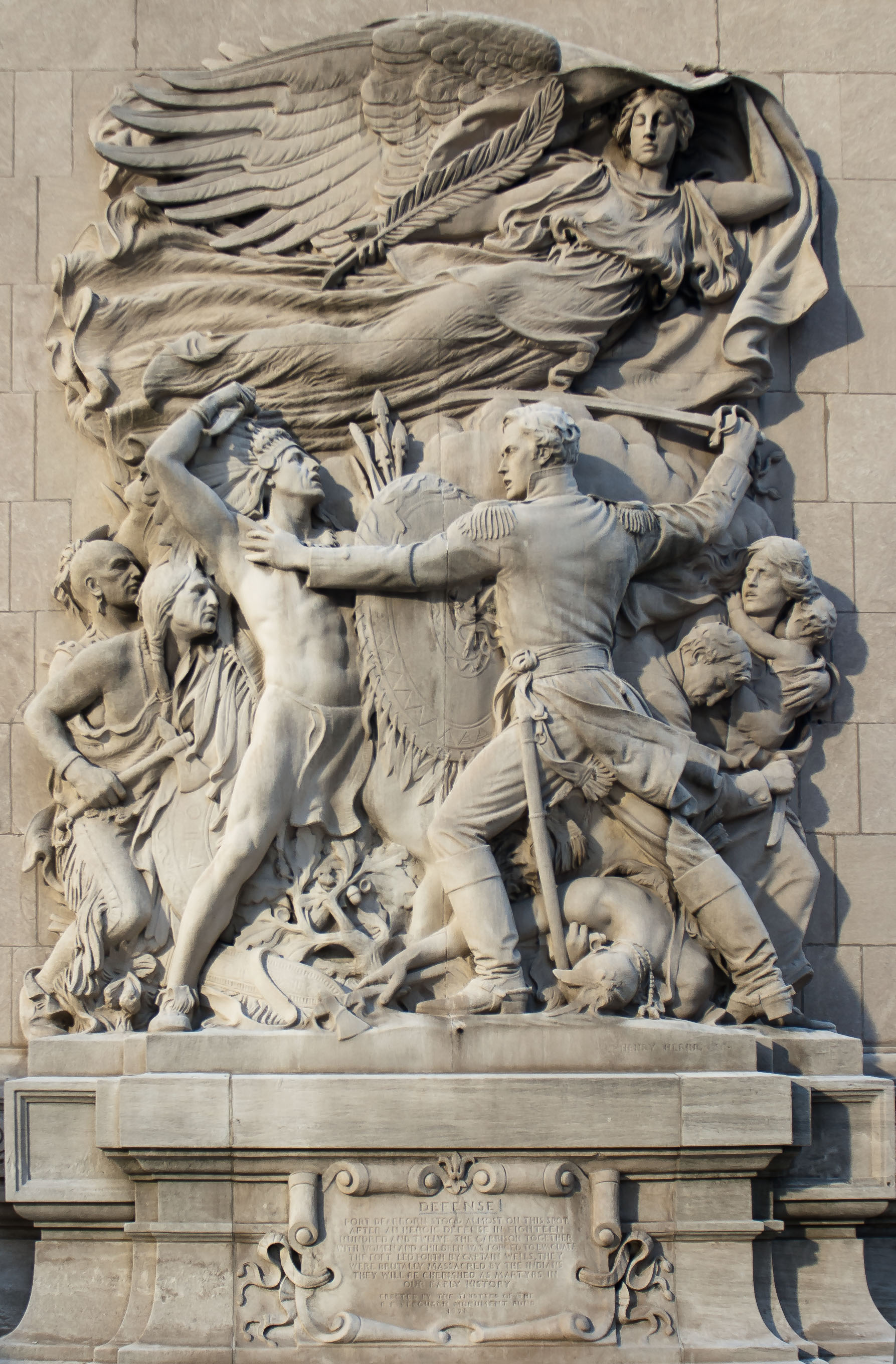
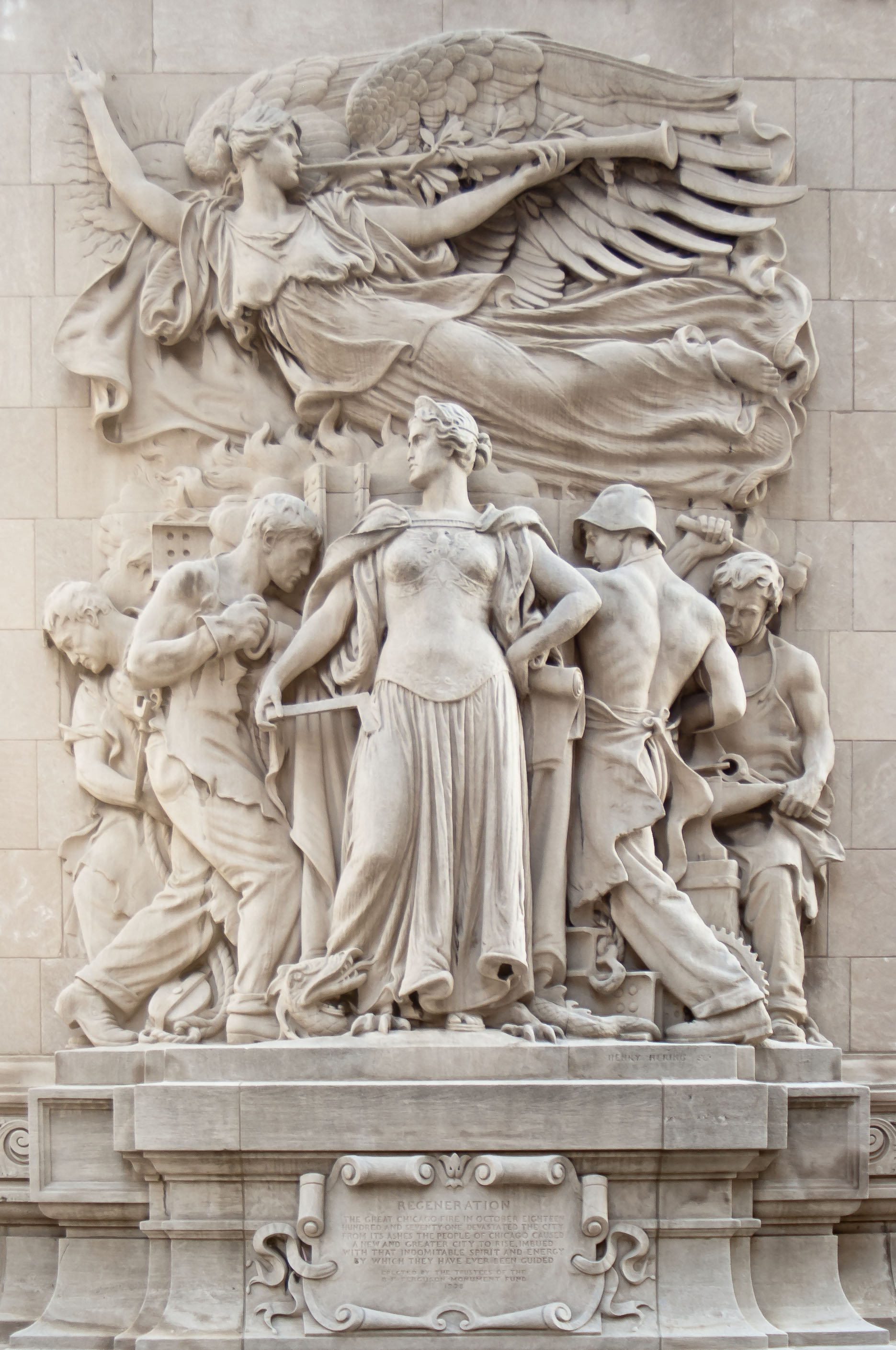
Sculptures on the bridge tender houses. Left to right: The Discoverers, The Pioneers, Defense, Regeneration.

In 1928, sculptures depicting scenes from Chicago's history were added to the outward-facing walls of the four bridgehouses. The sculptures on the northern bridgehouses were commissioned by William Wrigley Jr. and made by James Earle Fraser: The Discoverers depicts Louis Joliet, Jacques Marquette, René-Robert Cavelier, Sieur de La Salle and Henri de Tonti; The Pioneers depicts John Kinzie leading a group through the wilderness. The sculptures on the southern bridgehouses were commissioned by the Benjamin F. Ferguson Monument Fund, and are by Henry Hering: Defense depicts Ensign George Ronan in a scene from the 1812 Battle of Fort Dearborn; Regeneration depicts workers rebuilding Chicago after the Great Chicago Fire of 1871.

The bridge is also bedecked with 28 flagpoles, usually flying the flags of the United States, Illinois and Chicago. On special occasions other banners may be displayed.

== McCormick Bridgehouse & Chicago River Museum ==
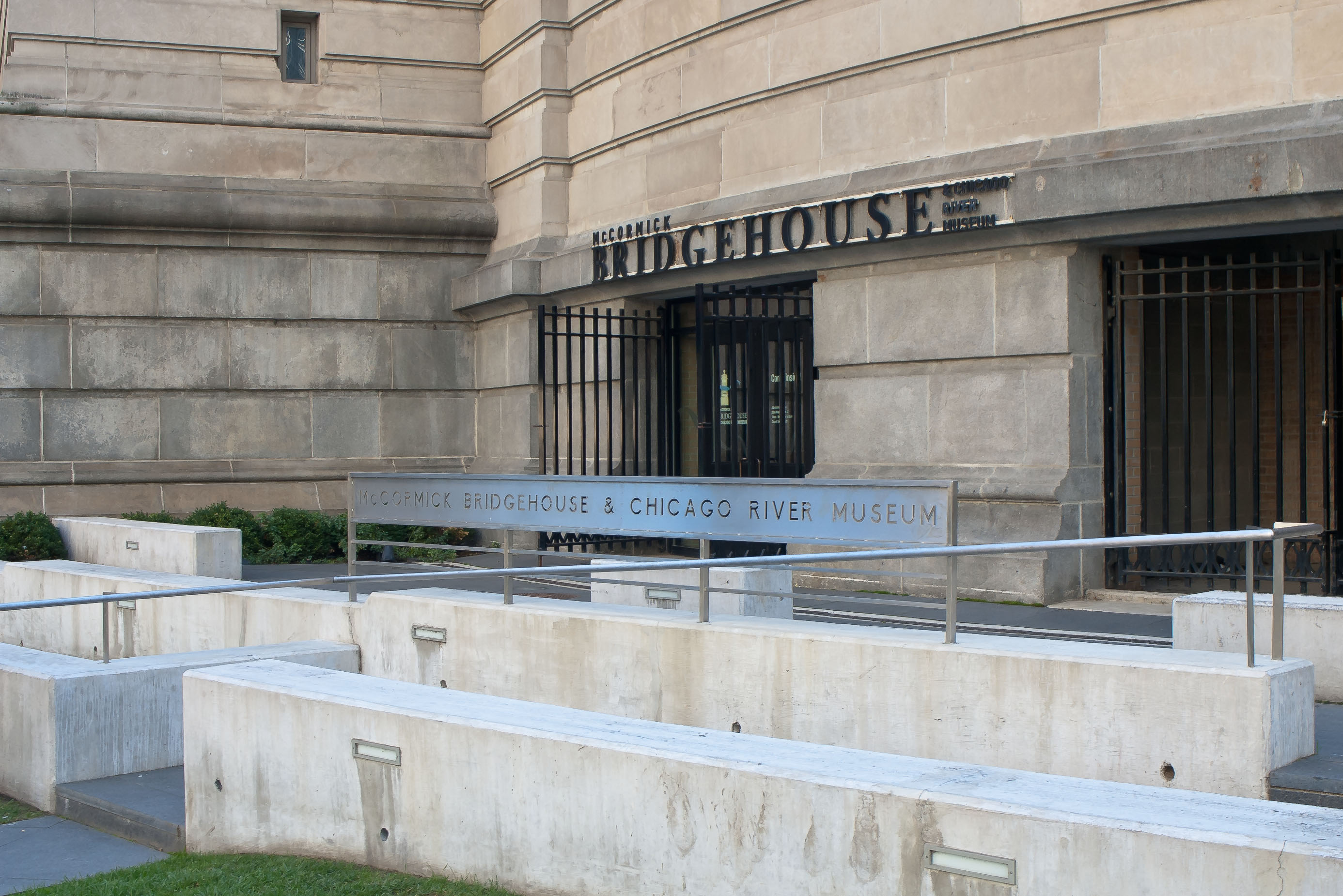
Entrance to the Bridgehouse Museum

The southwest bridgehouse has been converted into a museum, with its entrance off the Chicago Riverwalk. The McCormick Bridgehouse & Chicago River Museum is a 5-floor, 1,613-square-foot (149.9 m^{2}) museum that opened on June 10, 2006; it is named for Robert R. McCormick, formerly owner of the Chicago Tribune and president of the Chicago Sanitary District. The Robert R. McCormick Foundation was the major donor that helped to provide the $950,000 cost of the formation of the museum. It is run by the Friends of the Chicago River, and includes exhibits on the history of the Chicago River and the bridge. Visitors are also allowed to access the bridge's gear room; during the spring and fall bridge lifting, visitors can see the bridge gears in operation as the leaves are raised and lowered. Due to its small size and tight access stairway, only 79 people are allowed inside the museum at any one time.

In July 2019, the museum welcomed its 250,000th guest. Chicago Tribune cultural arts writer Steve Johnson called the museum's gear room, where the DuSable Bridge mechanics can be viewed working, "a little chamber of heaven for infrastructure nerds."

== See also ==
- Historic Michigan Boulevard District
- List of bridges documented by the Historic American Engineering Record in Illinois
- Multilevel streets in Chicago
