= Michigan–Wacker Historic District =

Historic district in Illinois, United States

- U.S. National Register of Historic Places
- U.S. Historic district
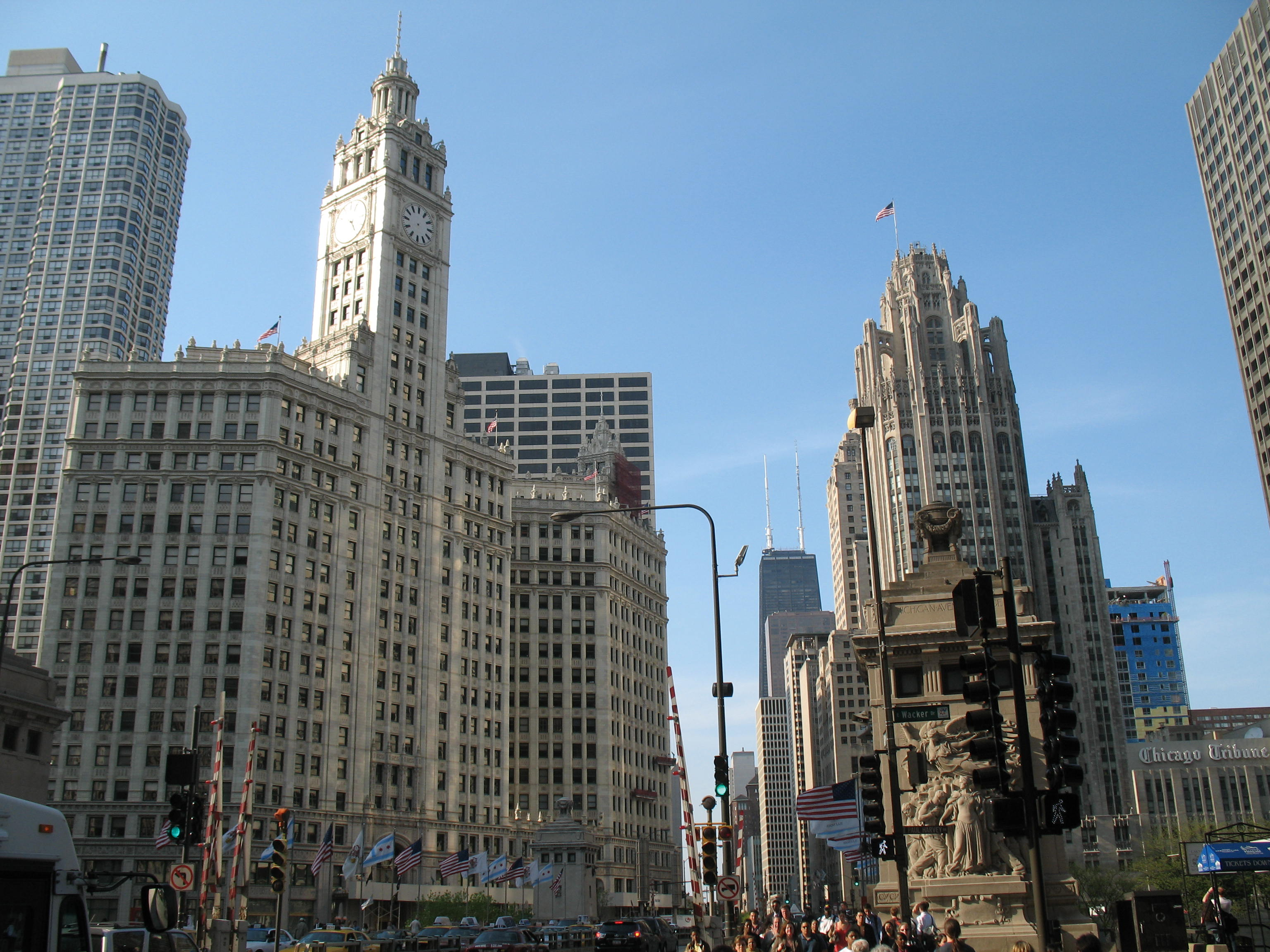
- Toward the north of DuSable Bridge on Michigan Avenue

- Location within Chicago metropolitan area Location within Illinois Location within the United States
- Location: Chicago, Illinois
- Coordinates: 41°53′19″N 87°37′29″W
- Area: 29.5 acres (119,000 m^{2})
- Architect: Holabird & Roche
- Architectural style: Gothic, Skyscraper
- NRHP reference No.: 78001124
- Added to NRHP: November 15, 1978

The Michigan–Wacker Historic District is a National Register of Historic Places District that includes parts of the Chicago Loop and Near North Side community areas in Chicago, Illinois, United States. The district is known for the Chicago River, two bridges that cross it, and eleven high rise and skyscraper buildings erected in the 1920s. Among the contributing properties are the following Chicago Landmark structures:

333 North Michigan
London Guarantee Building (360 North Michigan)
Carbide & Carbon Building (230 North Michigan)
Michigan Avenue Bridge
35 East Wacker
Mather Tower (75 East Wacker)
Tribune Tower (435 North Michigan)

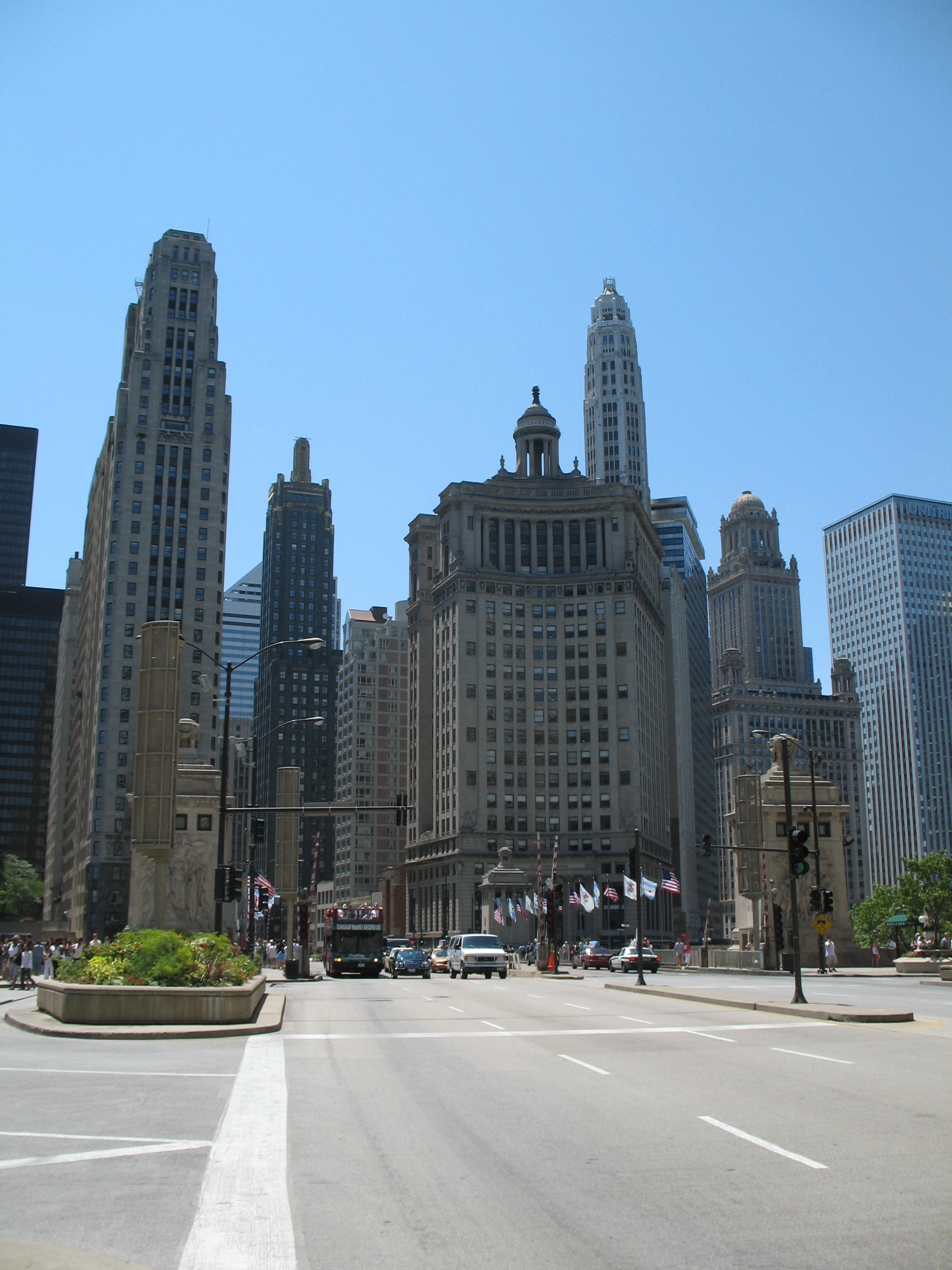
DuSable Bridge and southern part of district

Other notable sites include Pioneer Court the Jean Baptiste Point Du Sable Homesite (401 North Michigan), which as the site of Chicago's first permanent residence is a National Historic Landmark, and the Wrigley Building (410 North Michigan). Across the Michigan Avenue Bridge is the former site of Fort Dearborn, the US Army post established in 1803. To the west is the Heald Square Monument, a statue of George Washington and the financiers of the American Revolution.

The district includes contributing properties with addresses on North Michigan Avenue, East Wacker Drive, North Wabash Avenue and East South Water Street. Other streets in the district are Rush Street, Hubbard, Illinois, and Kinzie. The majority of these properties are on Michigan, with addresses ranging from 230 North Michigan to 505 North Michigan. The district also includes parts of Michigan, Wacker and East South Water, which are all among the many multilevel streets in Chicago. Most of its contributing high-rise buildings and skyscrapers are of either Gothic or Baroque architecture, in addition to Art Deco. The district is north of the Historic Michigan Boulevard District.

It was listed as on the National Register of Historic Places on November 15, 1978.

== See also ==
- Architecture of Chicago
- List of tallest buildings in Chicago
- National Register of Historic Places listings in Central Chicago
