= Apple Michigan Avenue =

Apple retail store in Chicago, Illinois

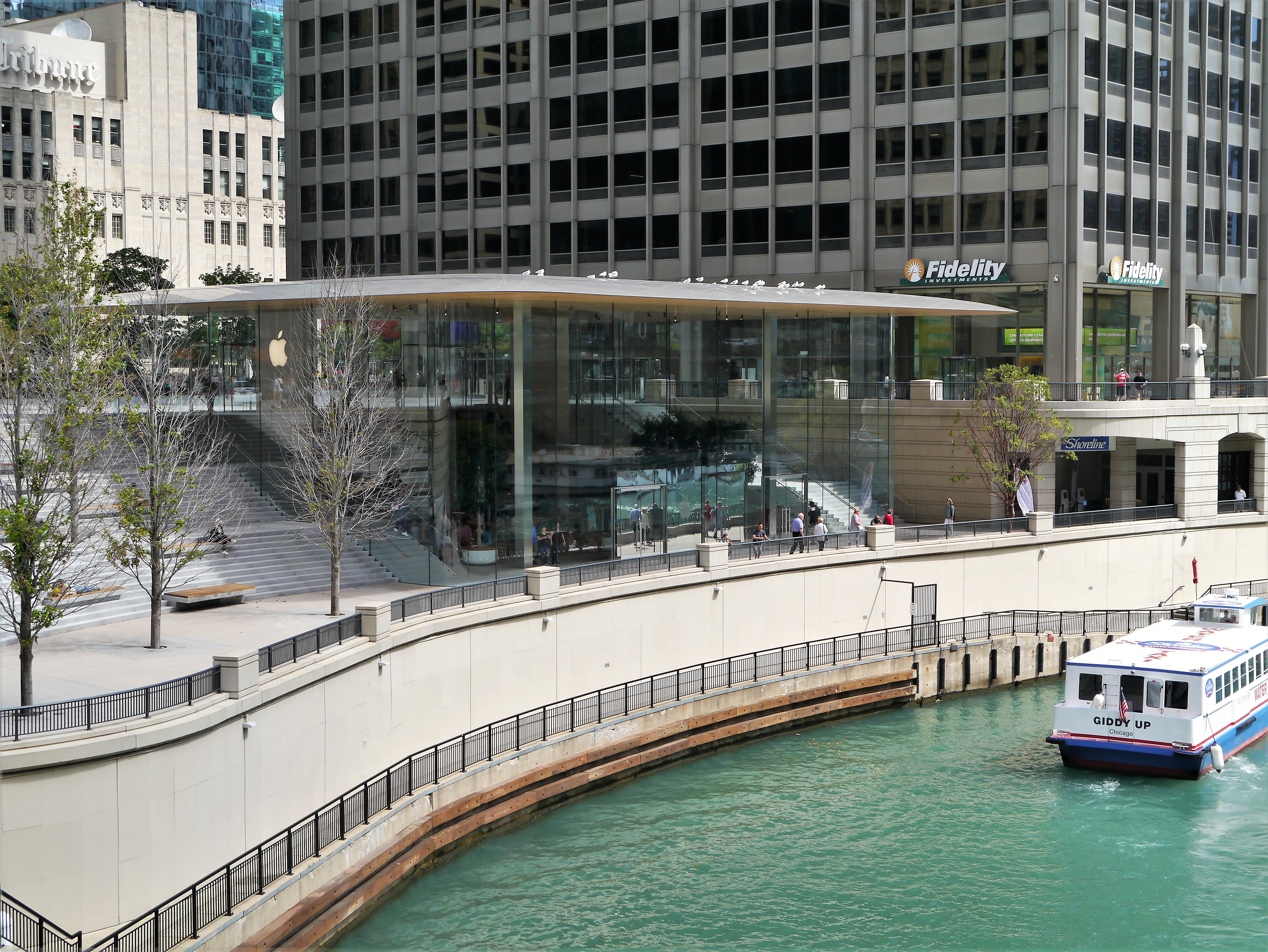
- Interactive map of the Apple Michigan Avenue area
- Former names: Apple North Michigan Avenue
- Alternative names: Apple Pioneer Court

General information
- Architectural style: Neomodern
- Location: 401 North Michigan Avenue, Chicago, Illinois, United States
- Coordinates: 41.88943°N 87.62351°W
- Opened: June 27, 2003; 23 years ago
- Relocated: October 20, 2017; 8 years ago

Technical details
- Floor area: 20,000 square feet (1,900 m^{2})

Design and construction
- Architecture firm: Foster + Partners

Website
- apple.com/retail/michiganavenue

Apple Michigan Avenue is an Apple Store, in the Near North Side, Chicago, United States. It is in the luxury shopping district of Magnificent Mile, adjacent to Pioneer Court. The store is considered one of several Apple flagship locations and the preeminent store for Apple in Chicago and the Midwest.

The store's first location was originally at 679 North Michigan Avenue. In 2017, it moved to its current location at 401 North Michigan Avenue.

== History ==
=== Original location ===
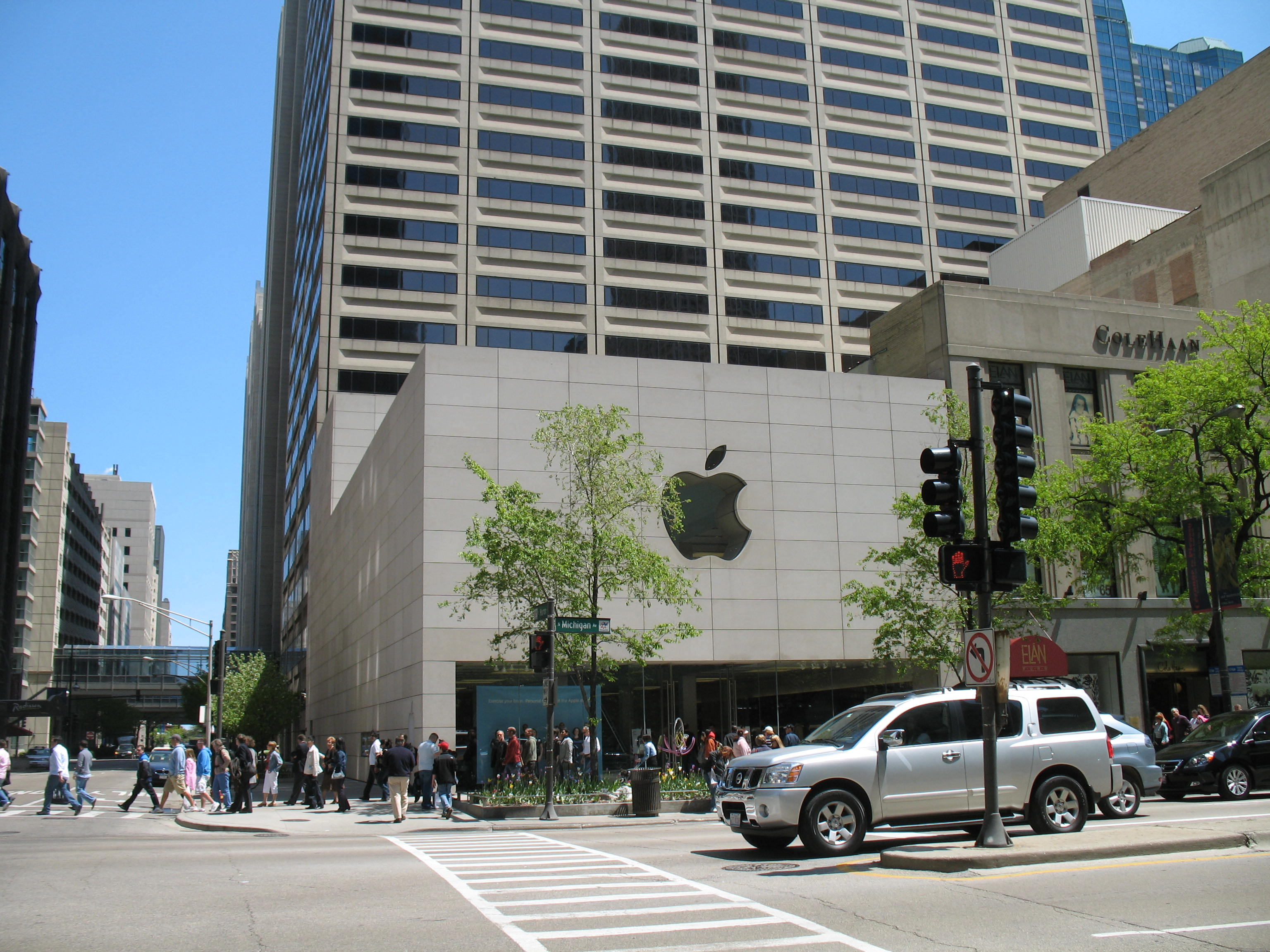
The stone facade of the original location

The first incarnation of the store, known as Apple North Michigan Avenue, was located at 679 North Michigan Avenue. The store opened on June 27, 2003; it was Apple's first flagship store and the first Apple Store in Chicago. Its serial number was R035. The original 30,000 square feet (2,800 m^{2}), three-floor store featured a stone facade with an apple logo shaped window, green roof, skylight, and signature glass staircase. The store's final day of operation was October 19, 2017. The former location remained empty until 2024, when an H&M store was opened in the space.

=== Construction ===
The Chicago Tribune discovered plans for the store's new location when it obtained a draft for the store from the Chicago Department of Planning and Development.

=== Opening ===
The store's new location opened on October 20, 2017. The opening was attended by Tim Cook and Illinois Governor Bruce Rauner.

=== Modifications ===
The store faced several problems upon opening. Several challenges were related to the climate of Chicago.

The store's glass exterior was frequently subject to condensation and frost. The HVAC system was modified to heat and cool the glass, matching the outdoor temperature and preventing the buildup of moisture.

The store's sloped roof was also subject to ice formation which, due to temperature fluctuations, made falling ice likely. The outdoor area beneath the roof was closed until the problem was addressed by a software update to the roof's heating system.

== Design ==
The building was designed by London-based architecture firm Foster + Partners.

=== Lighting ===
As part of Apple's goal for the store's interior to blend in with its surroundings, architects were tasked with matching the Apple Store's indoor lighting with the natural lighting coming from outside. As a result, the store uses a proprietary lighting system that predicts outdoor lighting conditions and dynamically adjusts the brightness and hue of the store's lighting to match it.

=== Reception ===
The roof was likened to a MacBook Air, but this is not an intentional effect. Chicago Tribune architecture critic Blair Kamin praised the store's openness, noting how little space is dedicated to actual product, and stated that the store kept with the local tradition of private riverfront buildings providing public space, which dated back to the Chicago Daily News Building.

== See also ==
- Architecture of Chicago
