= London Guarantee Building =

- London Guaranty & Accident Building
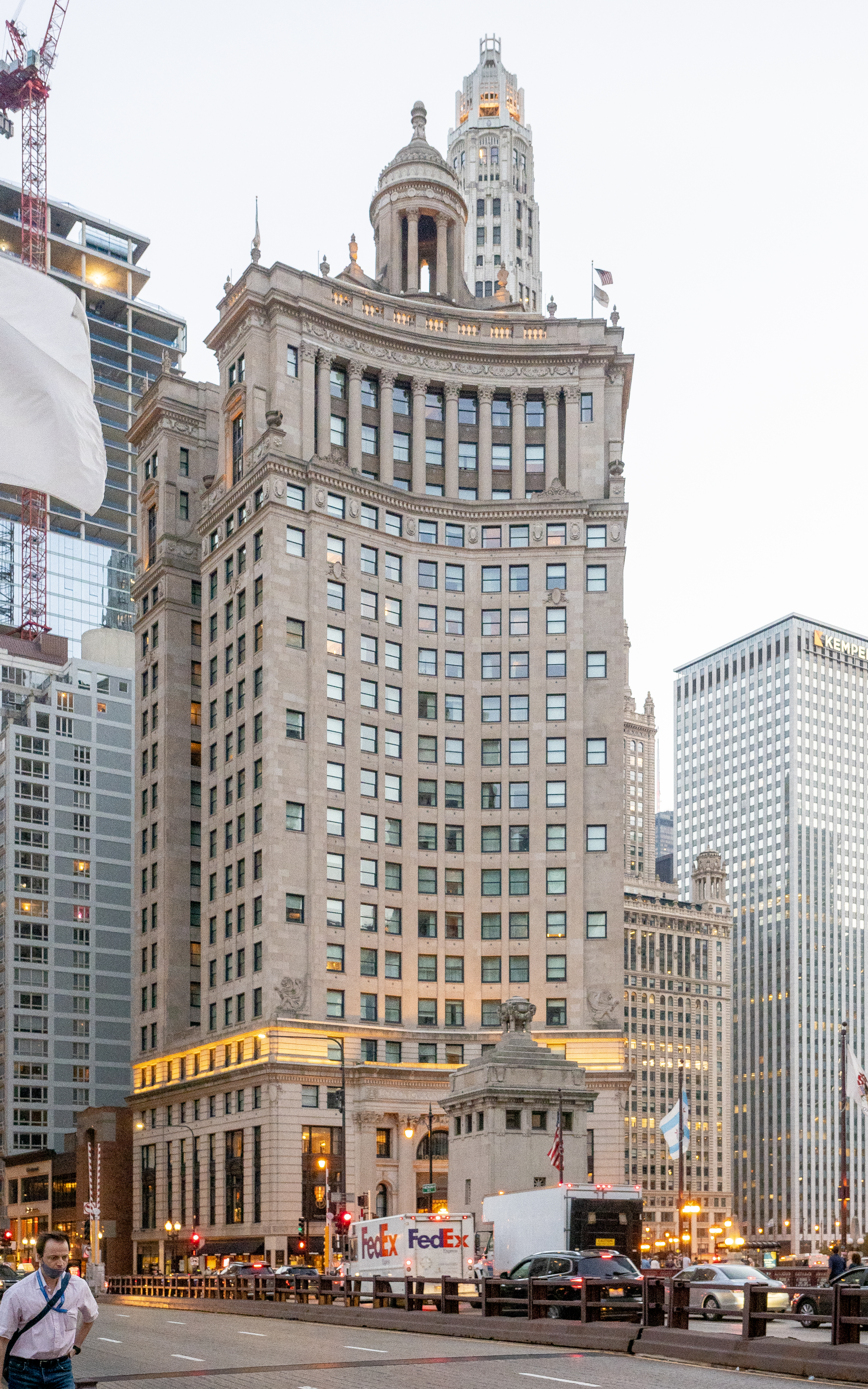

- Location within Chicago metropolitan area
- 41.888°N 87.625°W
- Location: 85 E. Wacker Drive at North Michigan Avenue; Chicago, Illinois

History
- Built: 1923

Site notes
- Architect: Alfred S. Alschuler
- Website: londonhousechicago.com

Chicago Landmark
- Designated: April 16, 1996

The London Guarantee Building or London Guaranty & Accident Building is a historic 1923 commercial skyscraper whose primary occupant since 2016 is the LondonHouse Chicago Hotel. This neoclassical building, which has also been known as the Stone Container Building for a past tenant, is located near the Loop in Chicago. It is one of four historic 1920s skyscrapers that surround the Michigan Avenue Bridge over the Chicago River (the others are the Wrigley Building, Tribune Tower and 333 North Michigan Avenue) and is a contributing property to the Michigan–Wacker Historic District. The building stands on part of the former site of Fort Dearborn and was designated a Chicago Landmark on April 16, 1996.

== History ==
The London Guarantee Building was designed by Chicago architect Alfred S. Alschuler and completed in 1923 for the London Guarantee & Accident Company, an insurance firm that was then its principal occupant. The top of the building is noted to resemble the Choragic Monument of Lysicrates in Athens, but it was modeled after the Stockholm Stadshus. It is located in the Michigan–Wacker Historic District. The building stands on the property formerly occupied by the Hoyt Building from 1872 until 1921. The LondonHouse Hotel name is an homage to the first owner of the 1923 Beaux Arts tower.

In the 1930s through the 1950s, the Haywood Publishing Company, founded by George P. Haywood, was housed in the building. The Haywood Publishing company, based in Lafayette, IN, published many periodicals and monthlys for the manufacturing industry.

From the 1960s through the 1980s, the studios of Chicago's WLS (AM) radio were located on the fifth floor of the building. For several decades, Paul Harvey performed his daily syndicated radio show from studios on the fourth floor. The building was also famous from the 1950s through the early 1970s for The London House, a Chicago jazz nightclub and steakhouse on the west side of the building's first floor; it had its own entrance on Wacker Drive. It was one of the foremost jazz clubs in the country, once home to performers including Oscar Peterson, Ramsey Lewis, Bill Evans, Dave Brubeck, Marian McPartland, Cannonball Adderley, Erroll Garner, Ahmad Jamal, Nancy Wilson, Barbara Carroll, Bobby Short and many others.

In the 1980s and 1990s TV show Perfect Strangers, the building's exterior was used as the home of the fictional newspaper Chicago Chronicle.

In 2001, the building was acquired by Crain Communications Inc. and was referred to as the Crain Communications Building. Crain Communications and other office tenants occupied the tower until Oxford Capital paid $53 million for the property. Crain sold the building during the summer of 2013 to a Chicago hotel developer, Oxford Capital Group, which remodeled the structure into a 452-room hotel, with the addition of a modern glass addition on an adjacent plot. Goettsch Partners designed the new 22-story addition on a parcel immediately west of the structure. On April 15, 2016, Oxford Capital Group sold the 452-room hotel, but also agreed to a 25-year contract to lease back and manage the hotel. Oxford, however, retained ownership of first and second floor retail space.

After an extensive renovation project, the building reopened as the LondonHouse hotel on May 26, 2016.

The Hello Kitty Cafe opened on June 30, 2026 in the base of the LondonHouse hotel.

== Gallery ==
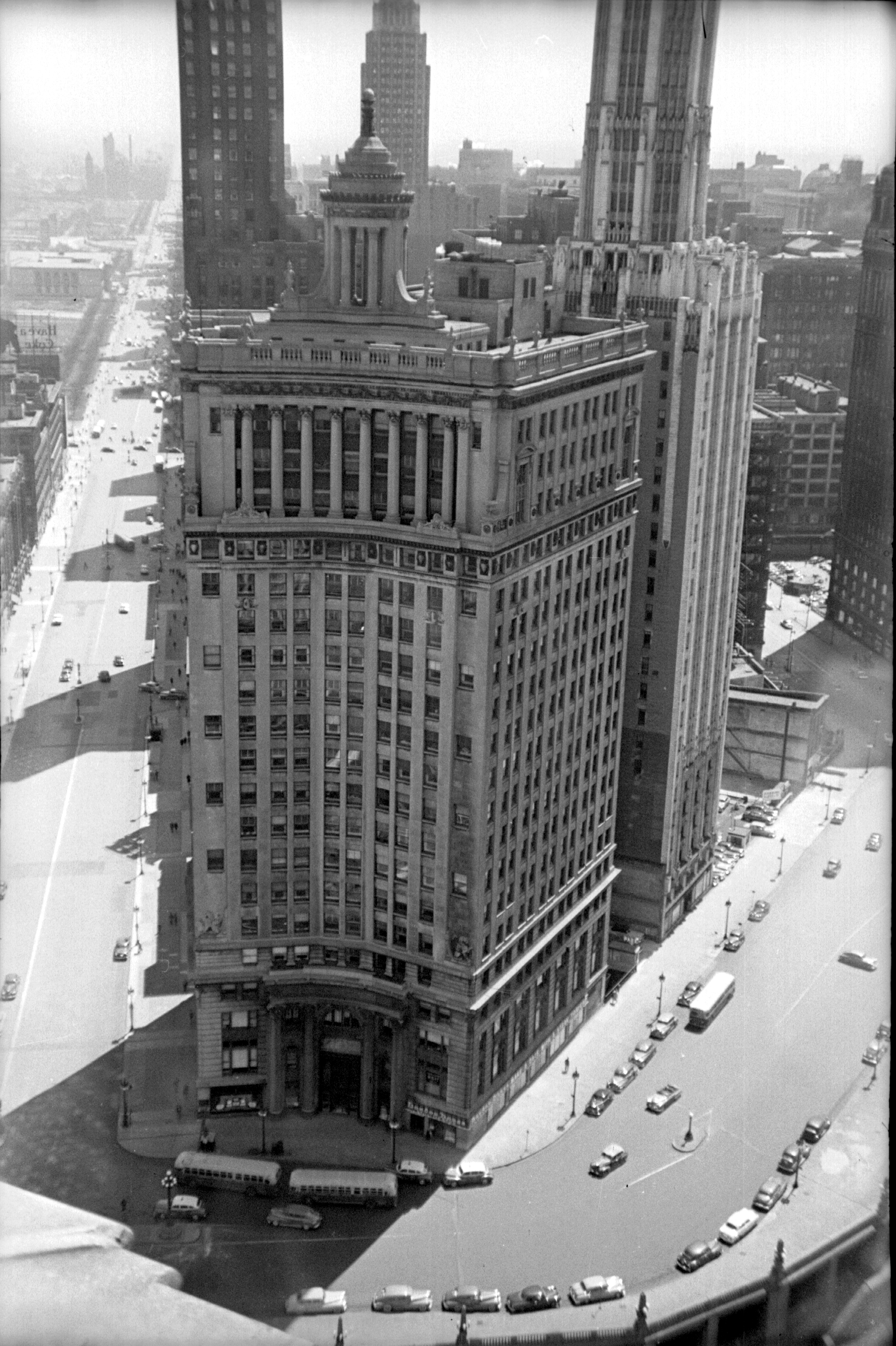
c. 1950

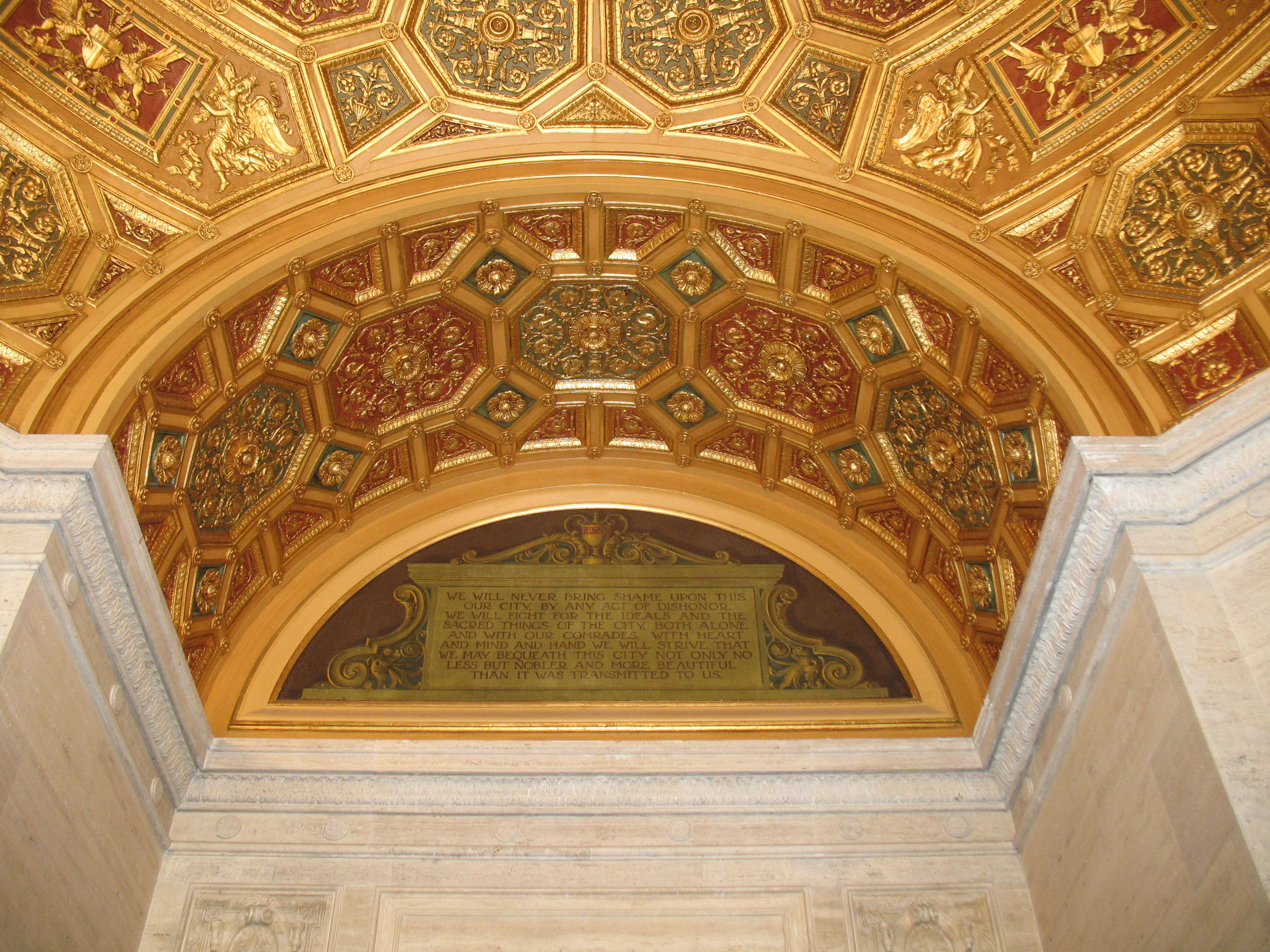
Rotunda ceiling

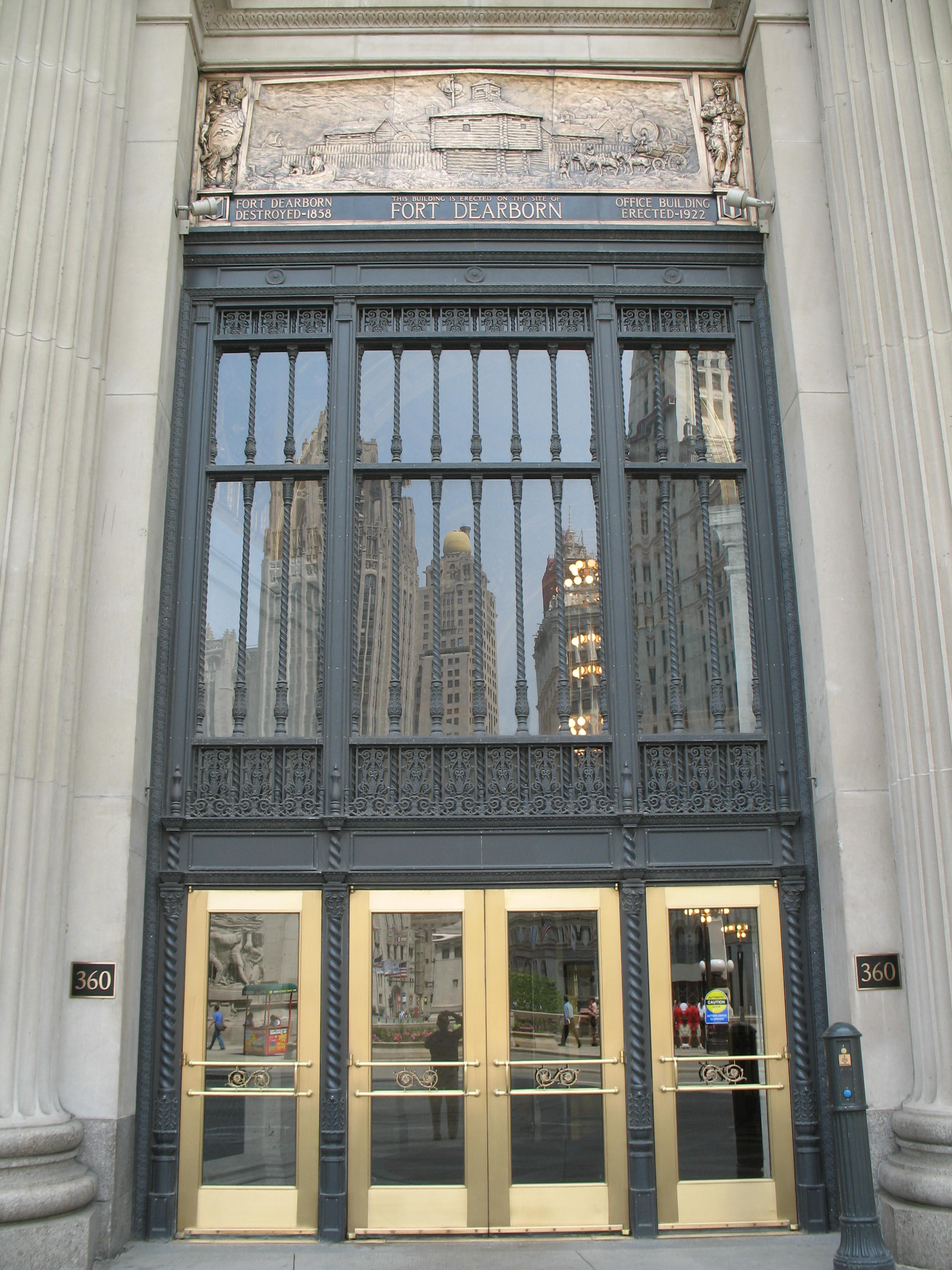
London Guarantee Building entrance commemorates Fort Dearborn in a brass and bronze relief panel above the lintel.

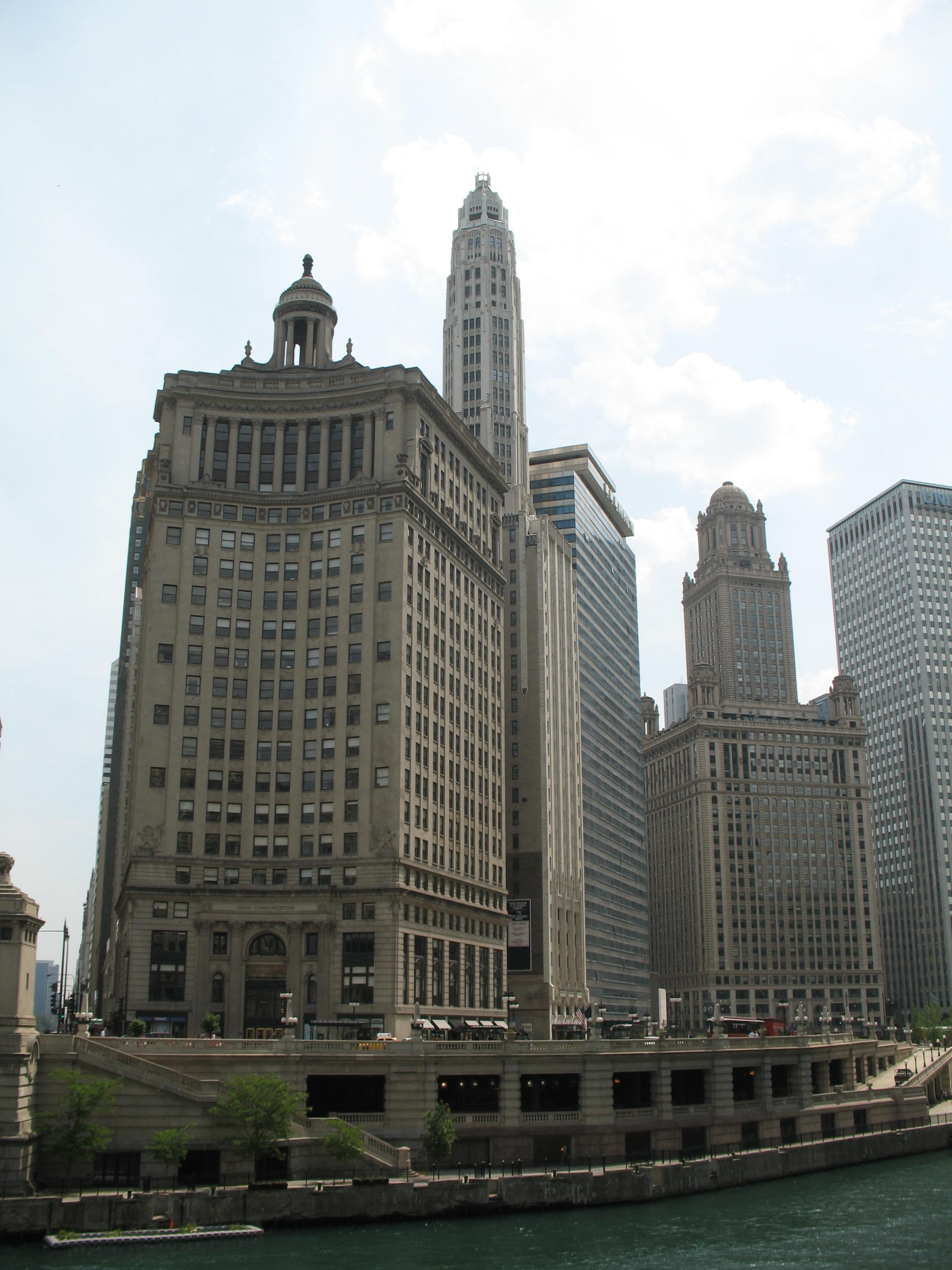
London Guarantee Building, Mather Tower and 35 East Wacker

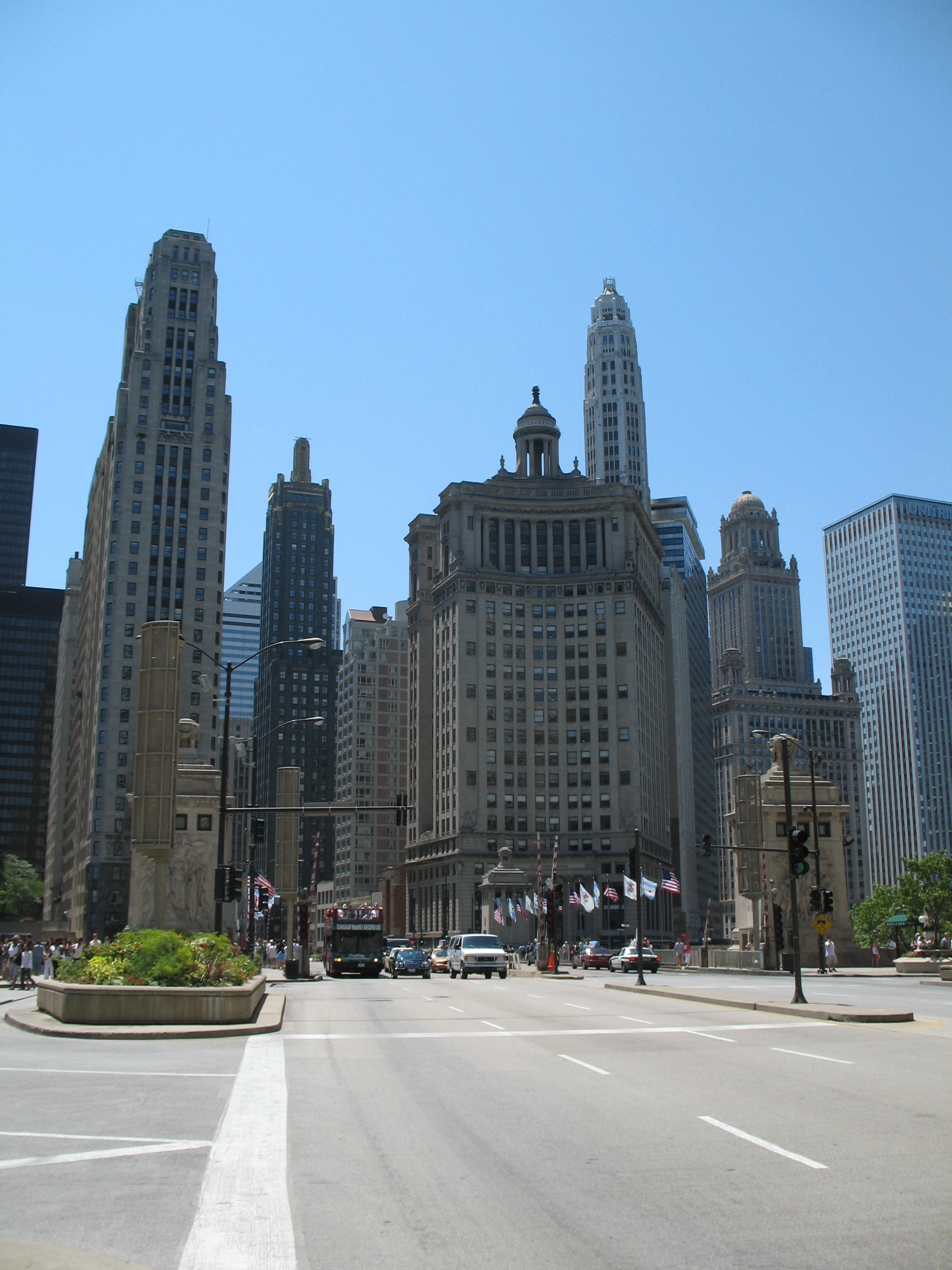
Michigan Avenue Bridge traffic (Background includes 333 North Michigan, Carbide & Carbon Building, London Guarantee Building, Mather Tower & 35 East Wacker

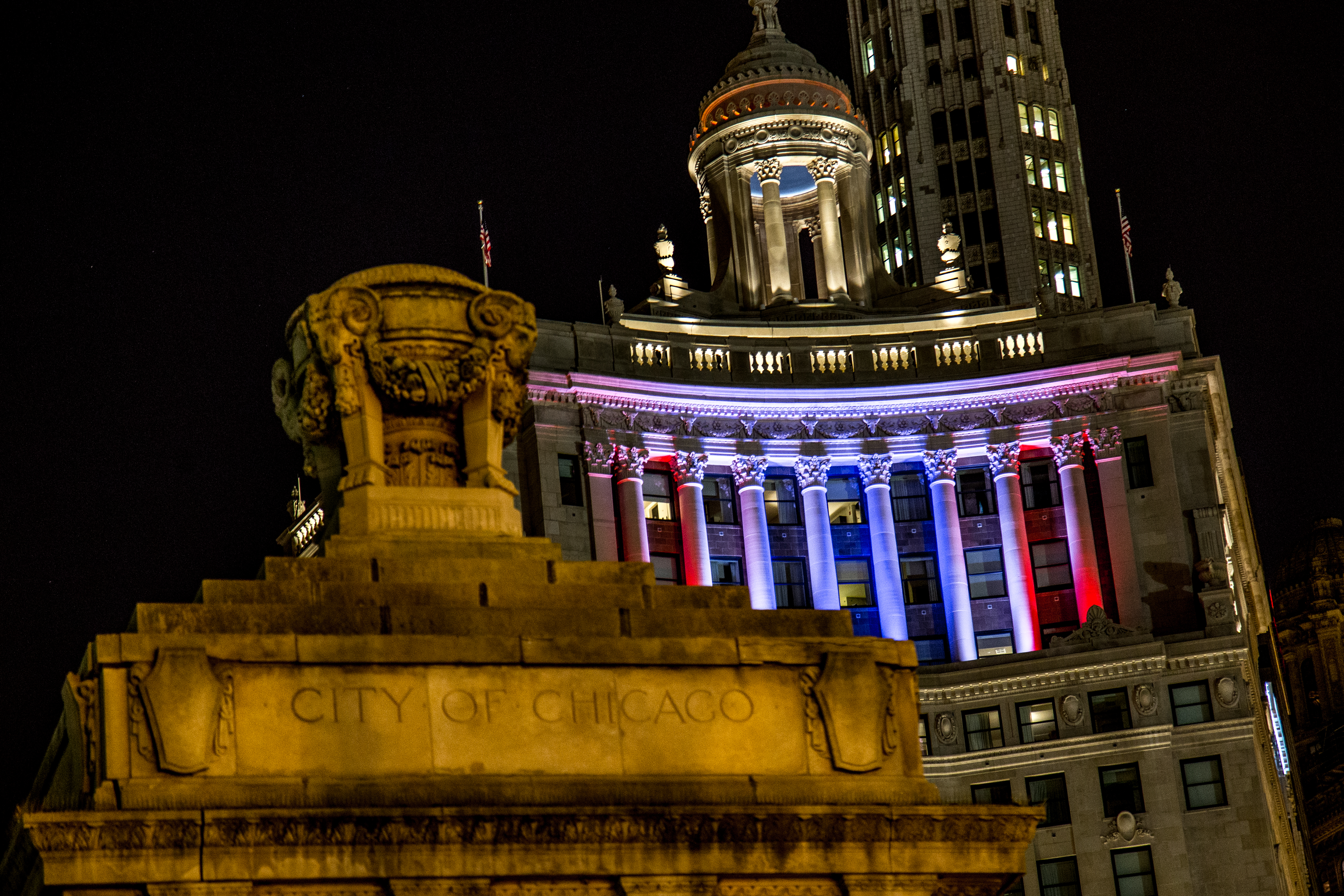
London Guarantee Building lit in the colors of the French flag, after the 2016 Nice truck attack
