= Bust of Jean Baptiste Point du Sable =

Sculpture in Chicago, Illinois, U.S.

- The bust in 2023
- Medium: Bronze sculpture
- Subject: Jean Baptiste Point du Sable
- Location: Chicago, Illinois, U.S.; 41°53′21.6″N 87°37′26.5″W

A bronze bust of Jean Baptiste Point du Sable by Erik Blome is installed in Chicago, in the U.S. state of Illinois.

== History ==
The work was installed in 2009.

The sculpture was vandalized in 2015. In 2023, members of the Black Heroes Matter Coalition placed a crown on the bust to commemorate Black History Month.
