= Pioneer Court =

Plaza in Chicago

Coordinates: 41.8898°N 87.6235°W

- Plaza
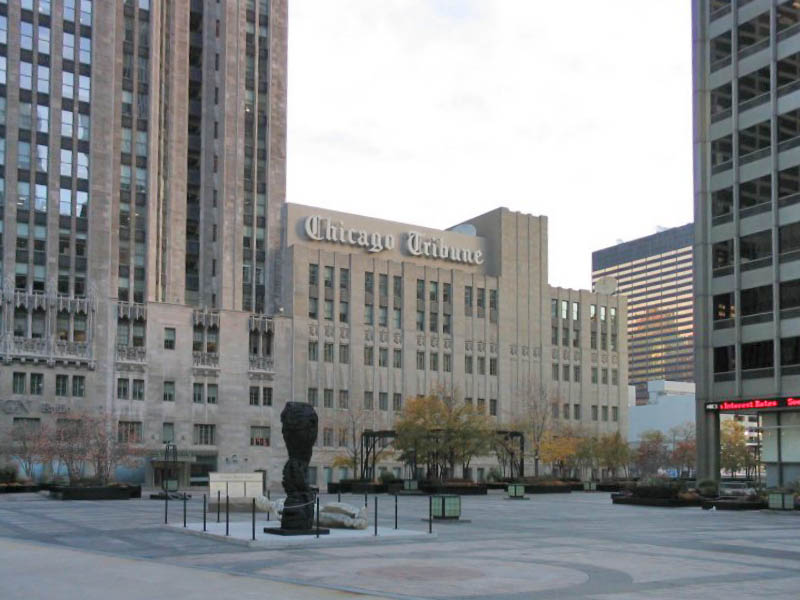
- North end of Pioneer Court
- Completed: 1965
- Area: 46,000 square feet (4,300 m^{2})
- Dedicated to: Jean Baptiste Point du Sable
- Owner: 401 North Michigan
- Manager: Zeller
- Location: Chicago, Illinois, United States
- Interactive map of Pioneer Court

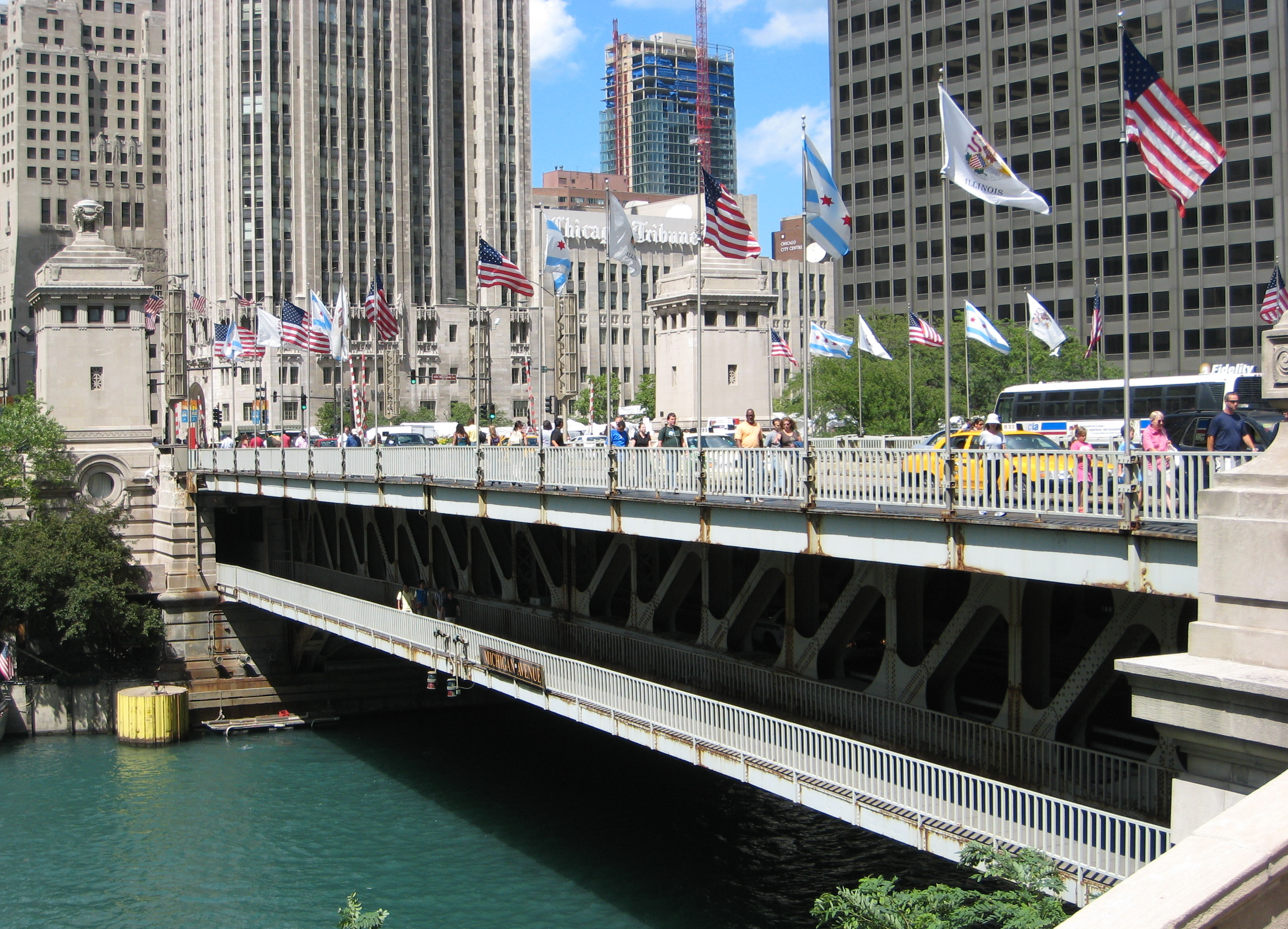
The trees in the area beyond the DuSable (Michigan Avenue) Bridge mark the location of Pioneer Court

Pioneer Court is a plaza located near the junction of the Chicago River and Upper Michigan Avenue in Chicago's Magnificent Mile. It is believed to be the site of Jean Baptiste Point du Sable's original residence and trading post. In 1965, the plaza was built on the former site of his homestead as part of the construction of the Equitable Life Assurance Society of America building. The Jean Baptiste Point Du Sable Homesite was designated as a National Historic Landmark on May 11, 1976. John Kinzie, a prominent early settler, bought and expanded Point du Sable's post in 1800. The Plaza is bounded on the north by the Tribune Tower, on the east by Cityfront Plaza Drive, on the south by the Chicago River, and on the west by Michigan Avenue, adjacent to the DuSable Bridge. In 2017, a newly designed Apple Store was opened on the south side of the court, which created new levels linking down to the river.

From 2011–2012 the plaza was the display site for the Seward Johnson statue Forever Marilyn. The statue was later moved to Palm Springs, California. The plaza was used as a location in the film Divergent in 2013. A new temporary statue was installed on November 1, 2016 in Pioneer Court. Also created by Seward Johnson, the statue, titled Return Visit, is 25 feet tall and depicts Abraham Lincoln standing next to a modern common man dressed in beige corduroy pants, sneakers and a cream color cable-knit sweater. The modern man is holding a copy of the Gettysburg Address.
