= Andrew Low =

Scottish-American cotton merchant

- Born: 20 July 1812; Kincardineshire, Scotland
- Died: 27 June 1886 (aged 73); Leamington Spa, Warwickshire, England
- Resting place: Laurel Grove Cemetery; Savannah, Georgia, U.S.
- Occupation: Cotton merchant
- Spouses: Sarah Cecil Hunter (m. 1844; died 1849) Mary Cowper Stiles (m. 1854; died 1863)
- Children: 7
- Relatives: Alastair Hugh Graham (grandson)

Andrew Low II (20 July 1812 – 27 June 1886) was a Scottish-American cotton merchant.

== Early life ==
Low was born in Kincardineshire, Scotland, on 20 July 1812. He was a son of William Low and Katherine (née Reid) Low.

== Career ==
In 1829, aged 17, Low emigrated from Scotland to Savannah, Georgia, to work for his uncle, also named Andrew. In 1839, his uncle retired back to England, and the young Low was in charge of the cotton firm, eventually becoming "the premier cotton merchant in pre-Civil War Savannah" and the city's richest man. After his uncle died in 1849, he inherited all of his property (including his home at 329 Abercorn Street) and businesses in Savannah and in Liverpool, England. The firm, known as Andrew Low & Co. in Savannah and Isaac Low & Co. in Liverpool, had a fleet of cargo ships which carried cotton from their warehouse, the Scott and Balfour Stores, on the river in Savannah to England, where he maintained an office in Liverpool.

He was also a director of the Merchants National Bank and the Central Railroad.

== Personal life ==
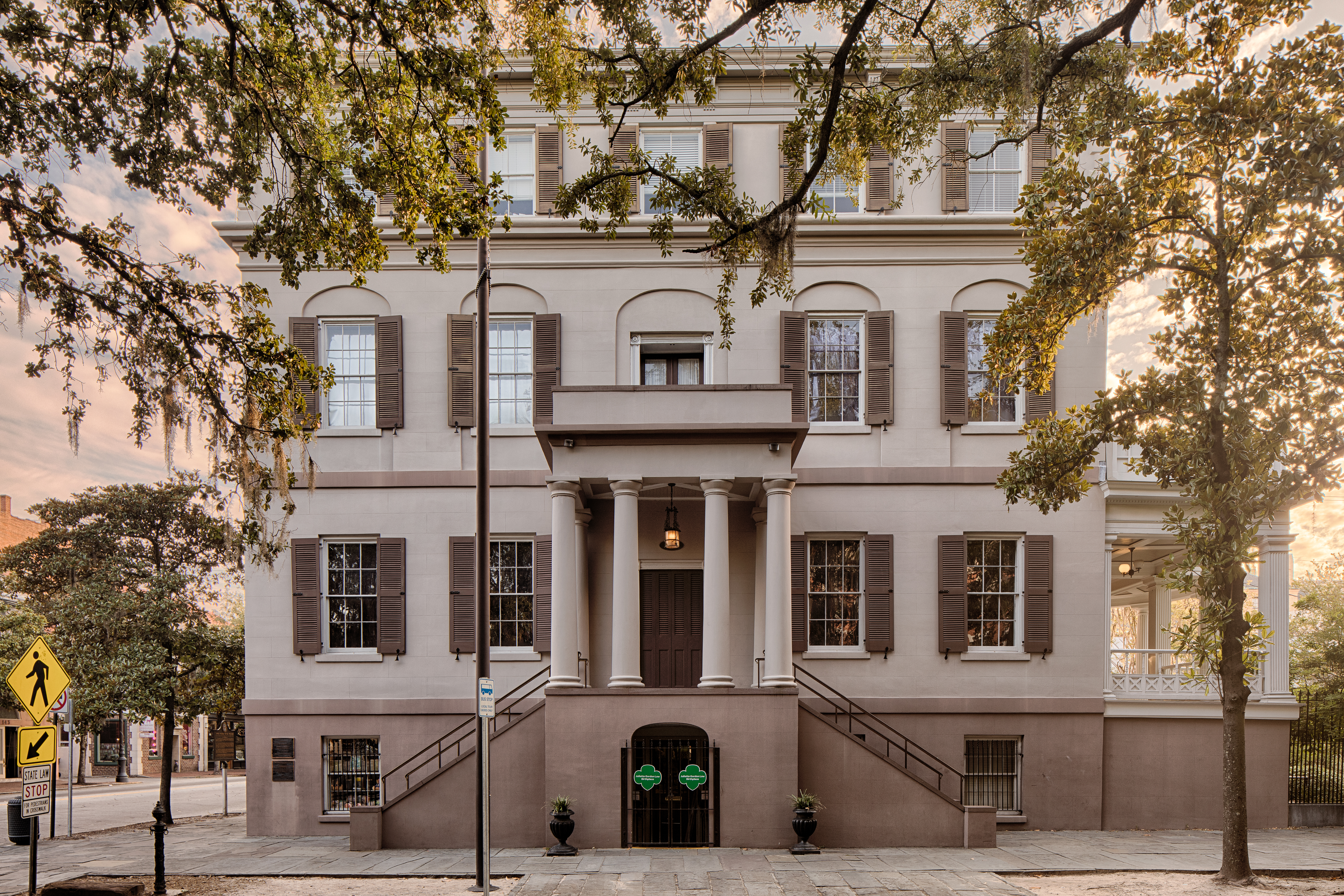
The Wayne–Gordon House in Savannah, Georgia.

In 1844, Low was married to Sarah Cecil Hunter (1817–1849), a daughter of Alexander Hunter and Harriet (née Bellinger) Hunter. Together, they were the parents of three children: Andrew (who died young), Amy and Harriet.

In 1854, five years after Sarah's death, Low remarried, to Mary Cowper Stiles (1832–1863), a daughter of U.S. Representative William Henry Stiles and Elizabeth Ann (née Mackay) Stiles. Her father also served as U.S. Chargé to the Austrian Empire. Together, they were the parents of:

- Katie Mackay Low (1855–1923), who died unmarried.
- Mary Cowper Low (1859–1932), who married David Charles Guthrie V of East Haddon Hall in 1891.
- William MacKay Low (1860–1905), who married Juliette Magill Gordon in 1886; she later founded the Girl Scouts of the USA; he lived at Wellesbourne House in England.
- Jessie Low (1862–1934), (Note: At her baptism at Christ Episcopal Church in Savannah on 29 July 1862, her sponsors were Miss Mary Glenn and Gen. Robert E. Lee.) who married Hugh Graham, a son of Sir Frederick Graham, 3rd Baronet, and Lady Jane Seymour (a daughter of Edward Seymour, 12th Duke of Somerset, and wife Jane Georgiana Sheridan), in 1888.

The Andrew Low Carriage House, part of the Juliette Gordon Low Historic District, is at 330 Drayton Street in Savannah. Low hosted William Makepeace Thackeray at his mansion, located in front of the carriage house.

Low died on 27 June 1886 at his home, Beauchamp Hall, Leamington Spa, in Warwickshire, England. His body was returned to America and he was buried alongside his wives at Savannah's Laurel Grove Cemetery.

=== Descendants ===
Through his daughter Jessie, he was posthumously a grandfather of four: Ronald Andrew Hugh Graham, Sybil Hattie Hermione Graham, Murial Mary Graham and Alastair Hugh Graham (1904–1982), an Oxford friend of Evelyn Waugh who was considered an inspiration for Sebastian Flyte in Brideshead Revisited.
