= Lafayette Square (Savannah, Georgia) =

Public square in Savannah, Georgia

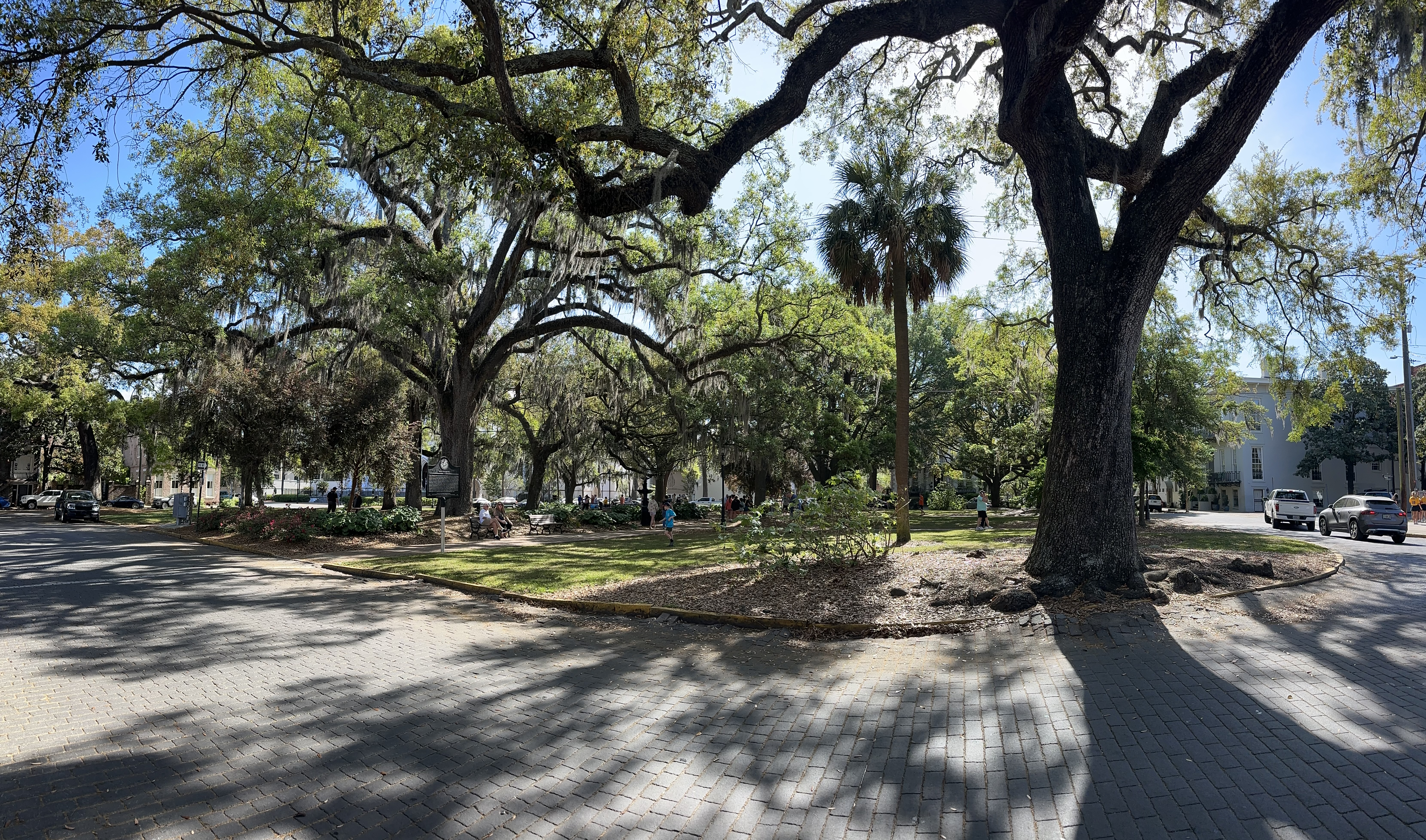
- Interactive map of Lafayette Square
- Namesake: Gilbert du Motier, Marquis de Lafayette
- Maintained by: City of Savannah
- Location: Savannah, Georgia, U.S.
- Coordinates: 32.0730°N 81.0917°W
- North: Abercorn Street
- East: East Macon Street
- South: Abercorn Street
- West: East Macon Street

Construction
- Completion: 1837 (189 years ago)

Lafayette Square is one of the 22 squares of Savannah, Georgia, United States. It is located in the fourth row of the city's five rows of squares, on Abercorn Street and East Macon Street, and was laid out in 1837. It is south of Colonial Park Cemetery, west of Troup Square, north of Taylor Square and east of Madison Square. The square is named for Gilbert du Motier, Marquis de Lafayette, the French hero of the American Revolution who visited Savannah in 1825. The oldest building on the square is the Andrew Low House, at 329 Abercorn Street, which dates to 1849.

The square contains a fountain commemorating the 250th anniversary of the founding of the Georgia colony, donated by the Colonial Dames of Georgia in 1984, as well as cobblestone sidewalks.

Adjacent to the square is the Roman Catholic Cathedral Basilica of St. John the Baptist. Given this proximity, Lafayette Square features prominently in Savannah's Saint Patrick's Day celebrations. Water in the fountain is dyed green for the occasion.

In this area is the museum known as the Flannery O'Connor Childhood Home, which is open to the public.

== Dedication ==
Namesake	Image	Note
Gilbert du Motier, Marquis de Lafayette		The square is named for Gilbert du Motier, Marquis de Lafayette (1757–1834), French aristocrat and military officer who fought in the American Revolutionary War.

== Markers and structures ==
Object	Image	Note
Fountain		The square's fountain, looking south to the former site of the Marist School at today's 123 East Charlton Street
Fountain		A video of the fountain.

== Constituent buildings ==
Each building below is in one of the eight blocks around the square composed of four residential "tything" blocks and four civic ("trust") blocks, now known as the Oglethorpe Plan. They are listed with construction years where known.

Northwestern residential/tything lot

- 104 East Harris Street (1875)
- Centurian House, 106 East Harris Street (1903)
- 118 and 124 East Harris Street (1852)
- 319 Abercorn Street (1888)
- Henrietta Cohen Property, 312–314 Drayton Street (1882)

Southwestern civic/trust lot

- Andrew Low House, 329 Abercorn Street (1849) – part of the Juliette Gordon Low Historic District; oldest building on the square
- Andrew Low Carriage House, 330 Drayton Street (1849) – part of the Juliette Gordon Low Historic District

Southwestern residential/tything lot

- Marist Place, 123 East Charlton Street – former site of the Marist School
- Battersby–Hartridge–Anderson House, 119 East Charlton Street (1852)

Northeastern residential/tything lot

- Cathedral Basilica of St. John the Baptist, 222 East Harris Street (1876) – spires added in 1896

Southeastern civic/trust lot

- Hamilton–Turner Inn, 330 Abercorn Street (1873)

Southeastern residential/tything lot

- Fitzgerald Pelot Duplex, 221–223 East Charlton Street (1854–1855)
- Catherine McMahon House, 211 East Charlton Street (1853)
- Flannery O'Connor Childhood Home, 207 East Charlton Street (1856)
- John B. Gallie House, 201–203 East Charlton Street (1858)
- 340 Abercorn Street (1903)

The Octavius Cohen House, built in 1848, formerly stood at 327 Abercorn Street. It was demolished to make way for today's Lafayette Condominiums, once owned by Joe Odom.

== Gallery ==
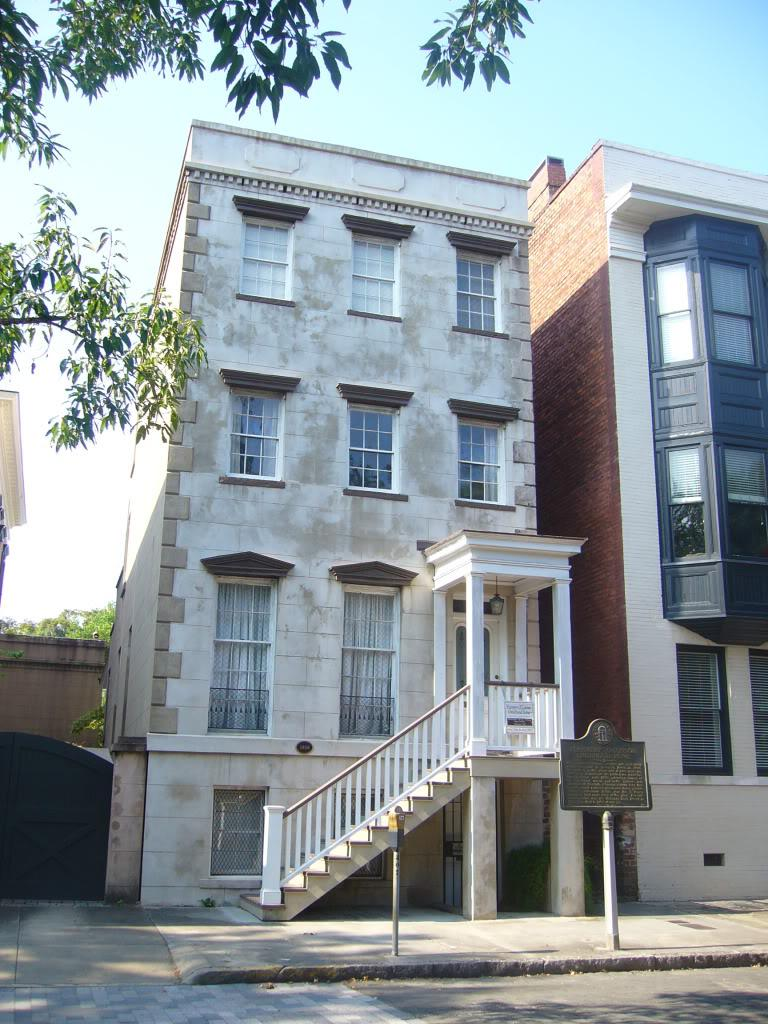
Flannery O'Connor's childhood home stands in the southeastern tything lot of the square

Cathedral Basilica of St. John the Baptist, 222 East Harris Street

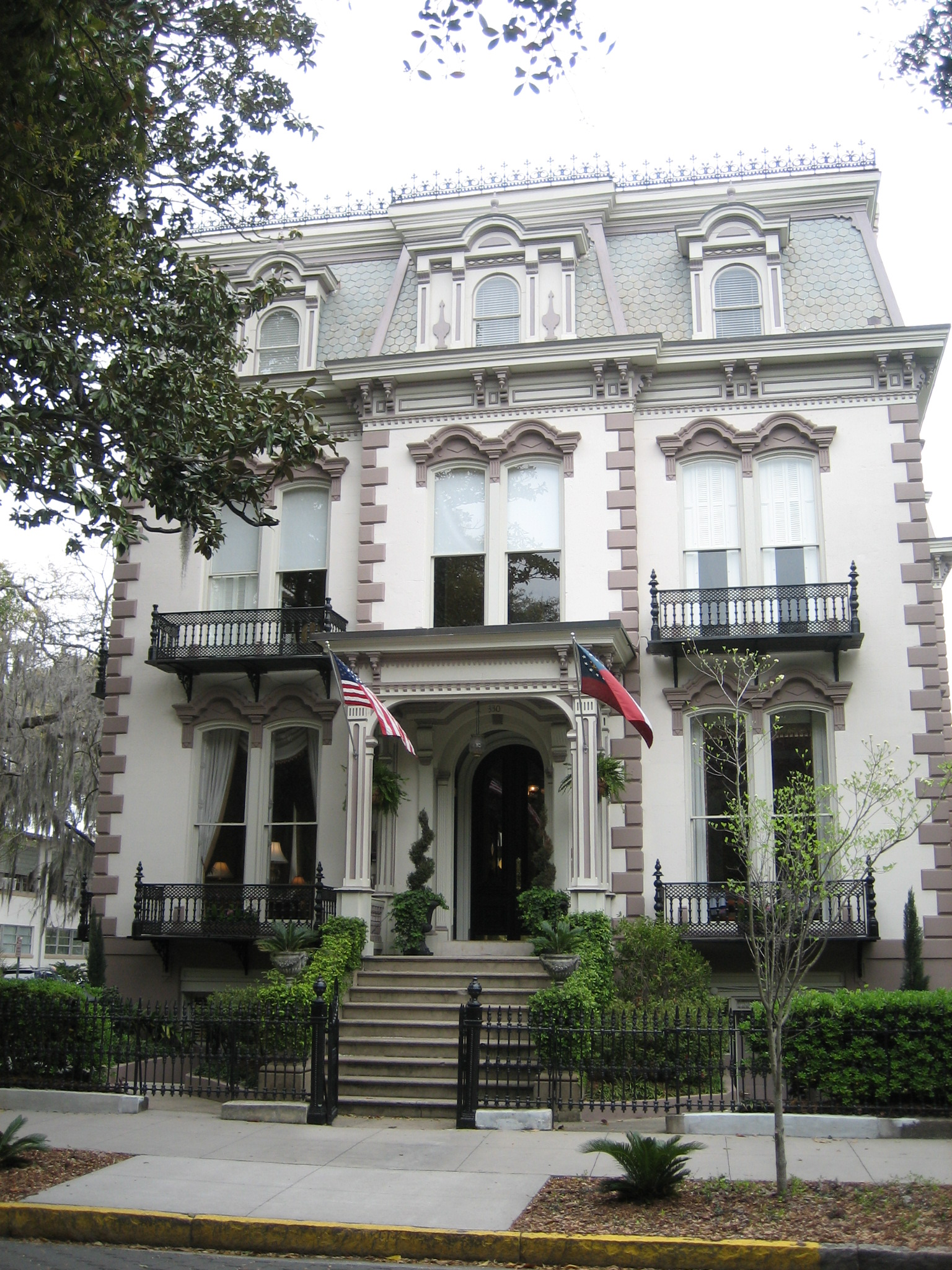
Hamilton-Turner Inn, 330 Abercorn Street

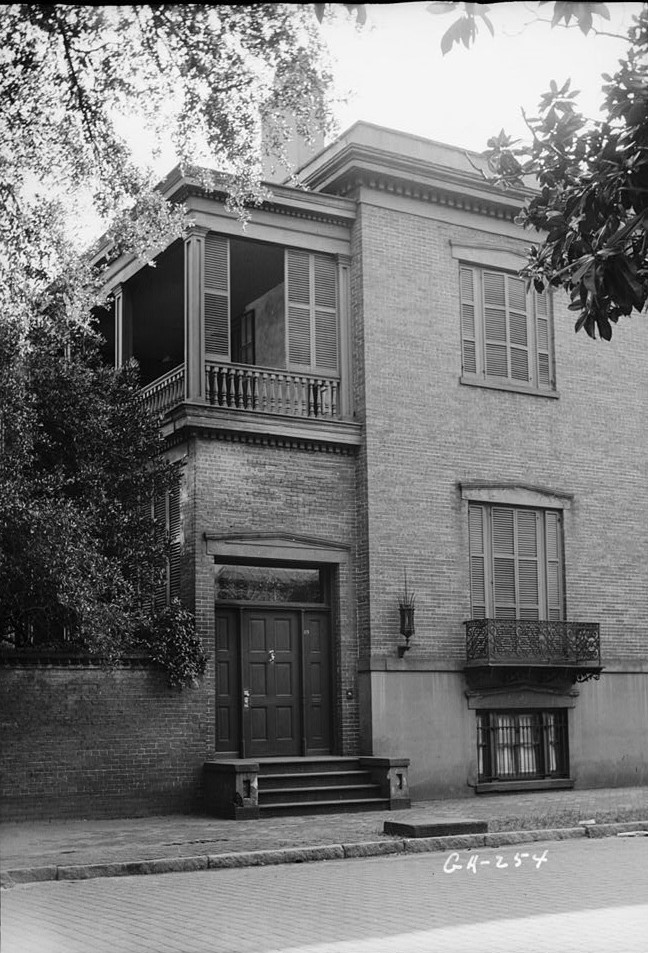
Battersby–Hartridge–Anderson House, 119 East Charlton Street

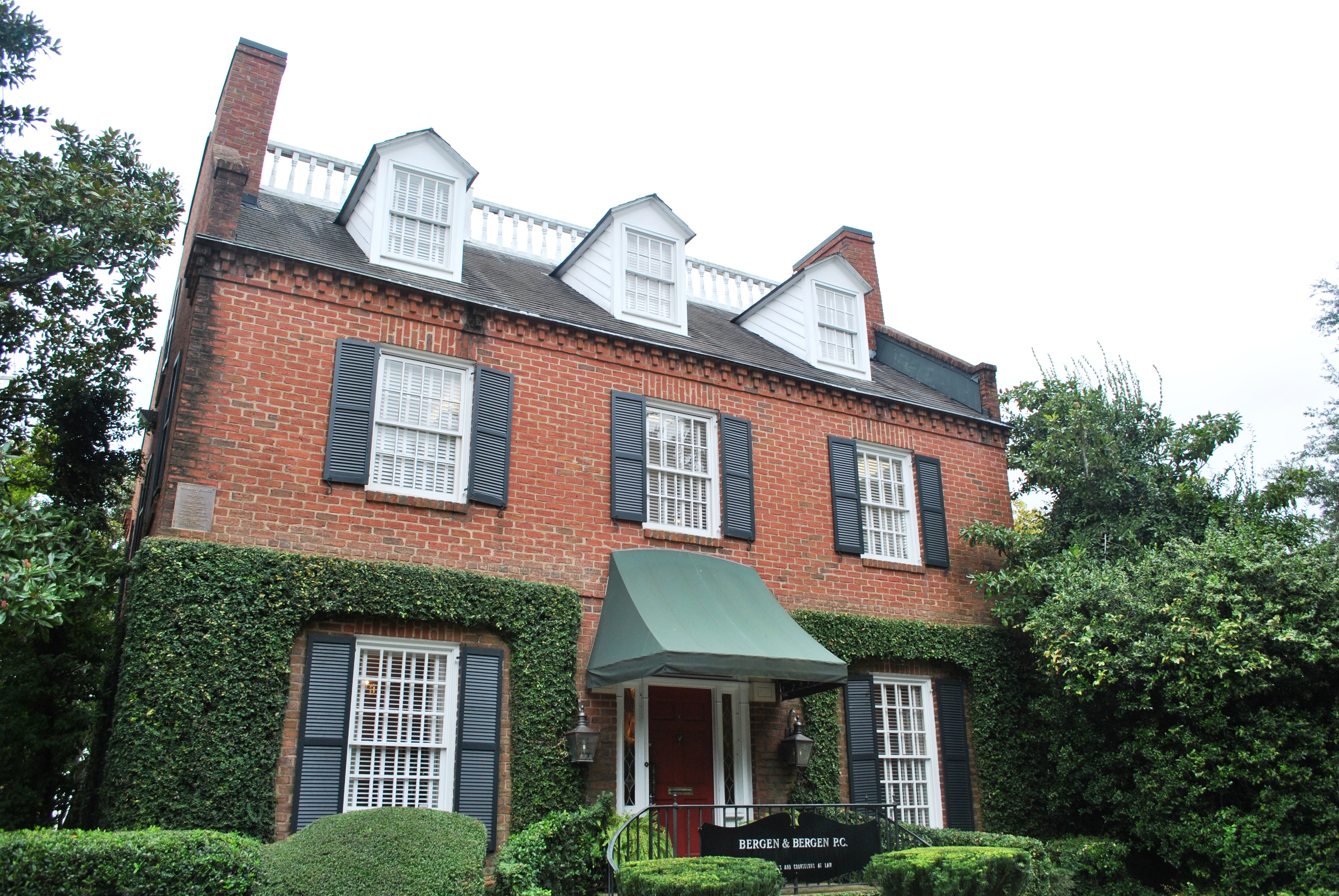
Marist Place, 123 East Charlton Street

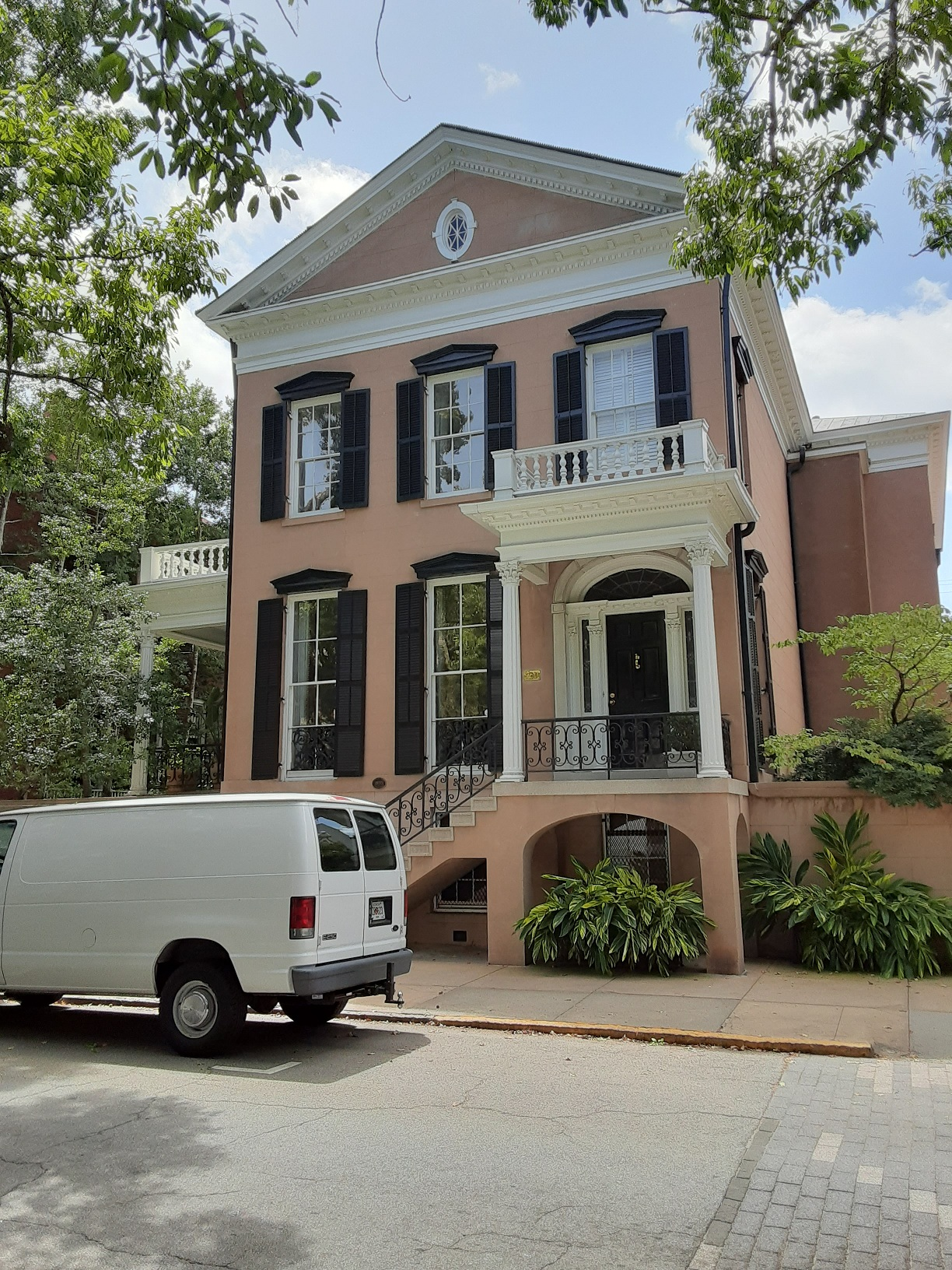
Catherine McMahon House, 211 East Charlton Street

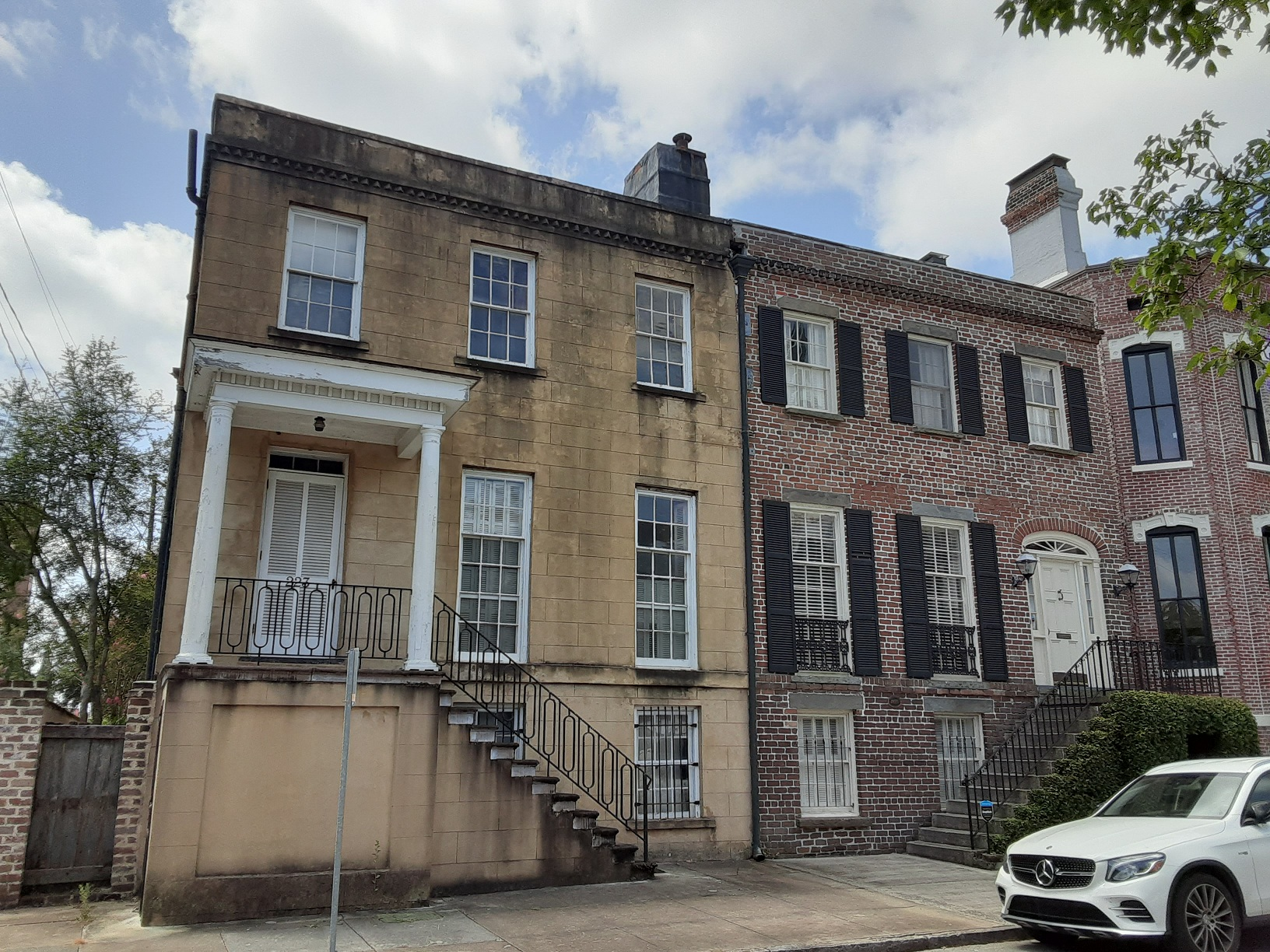
Fitzgerald Pelot Duplex, 221–223 East Charlton Street

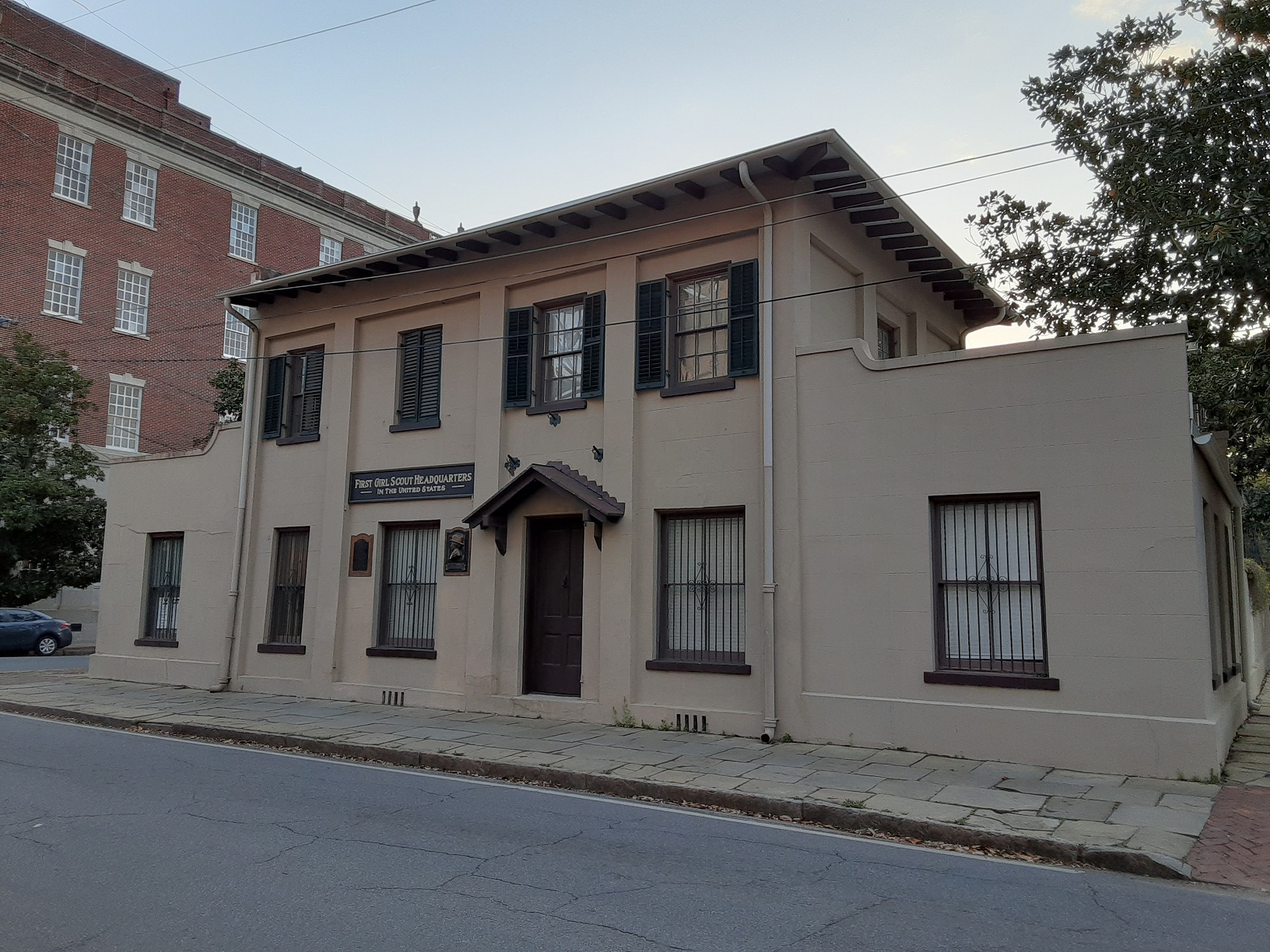
Andrew Low Carriage House, 330 Drayton Street

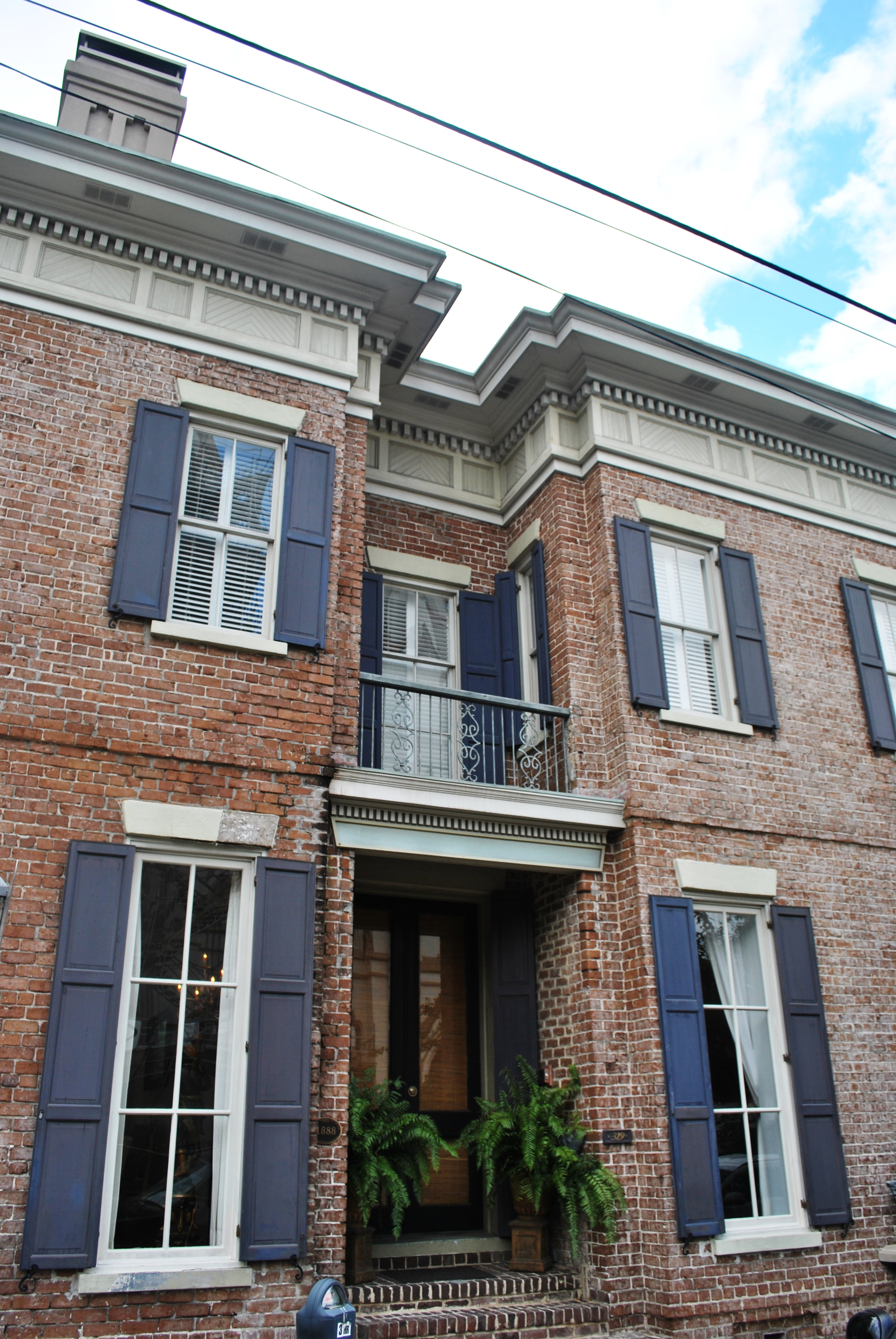
319 Abercorn Street

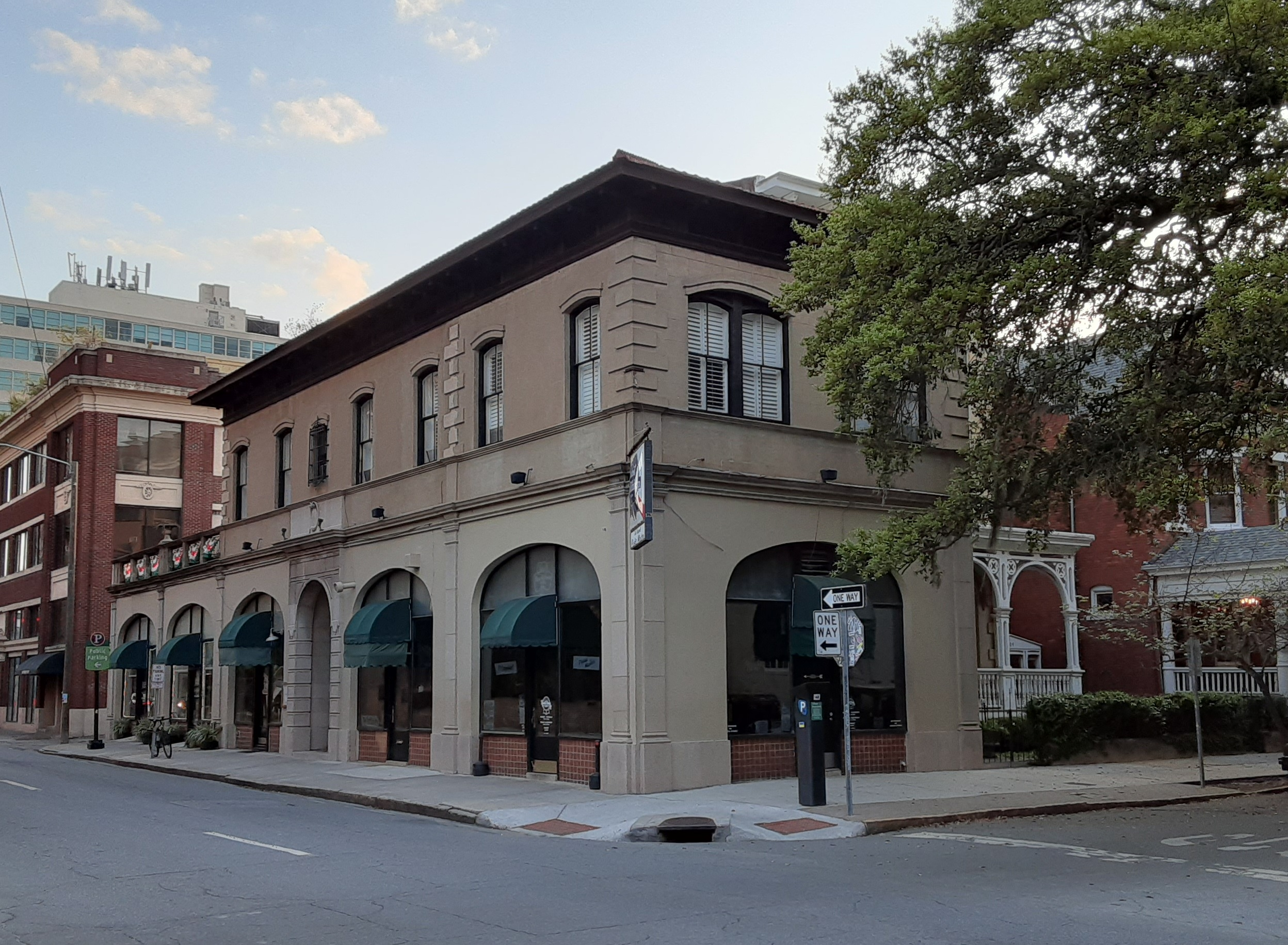
Henrietta Cohen Property, 312–314 Drayton Street

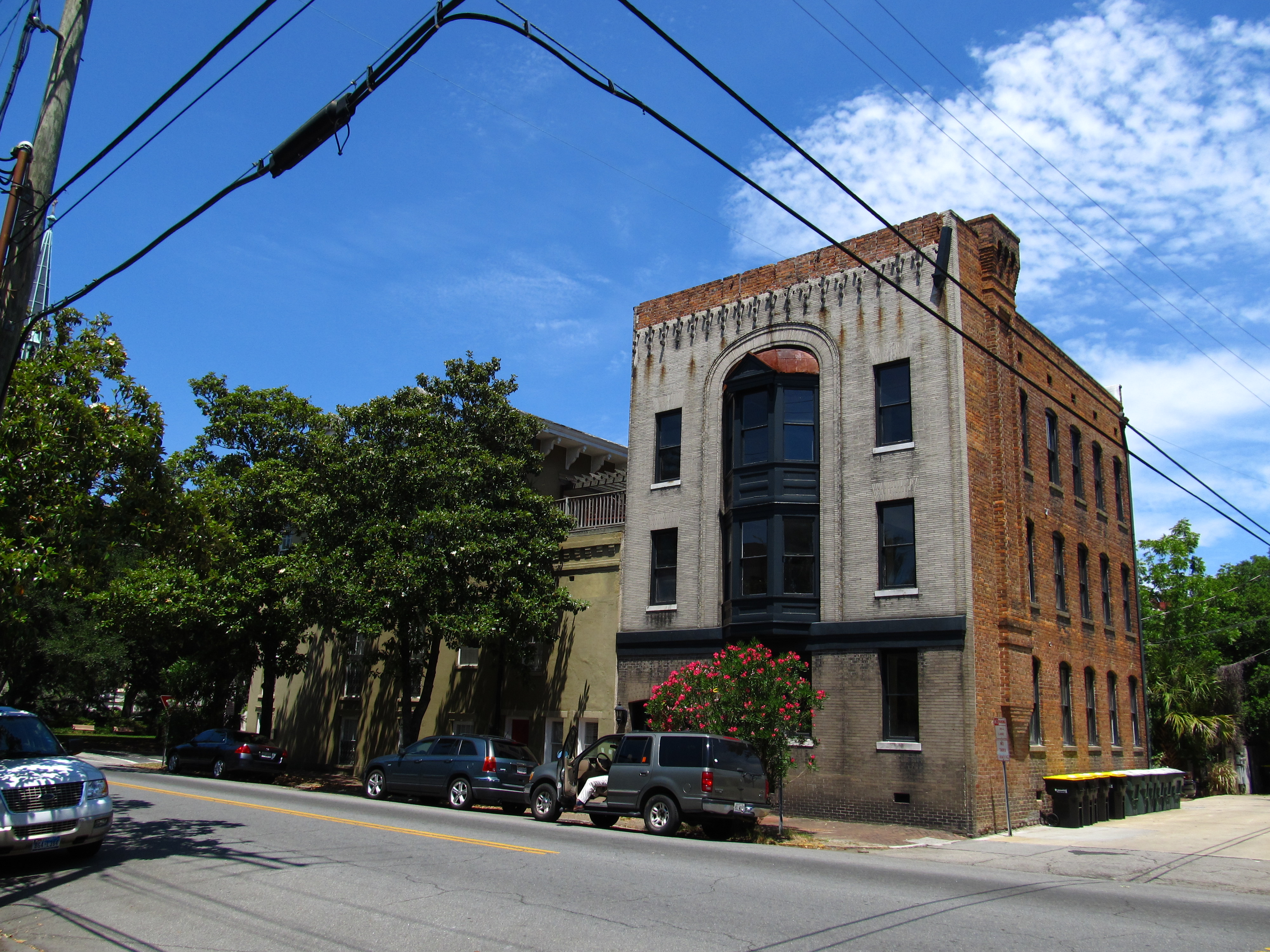
340 Abercorn Street

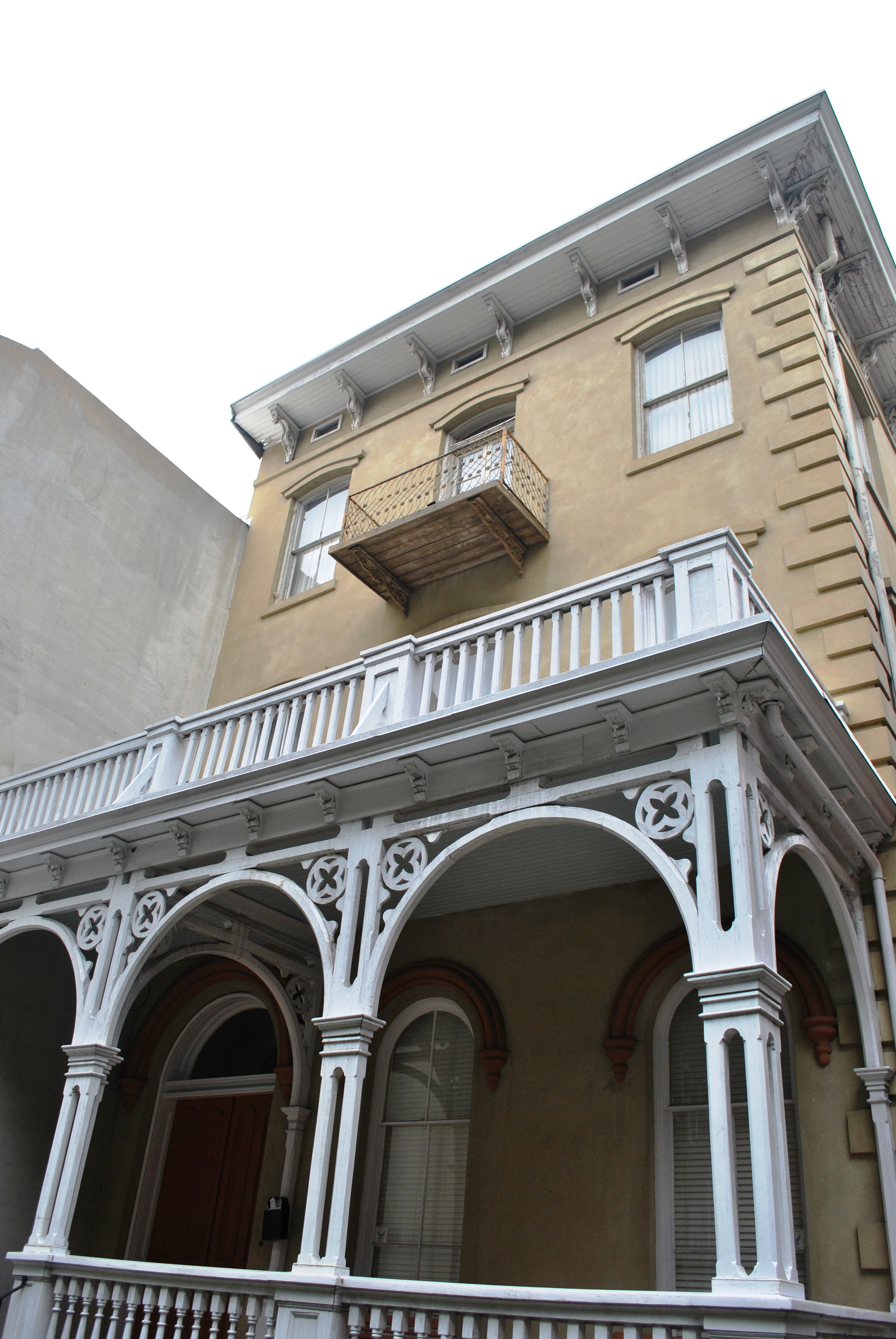
104 East Harris Street

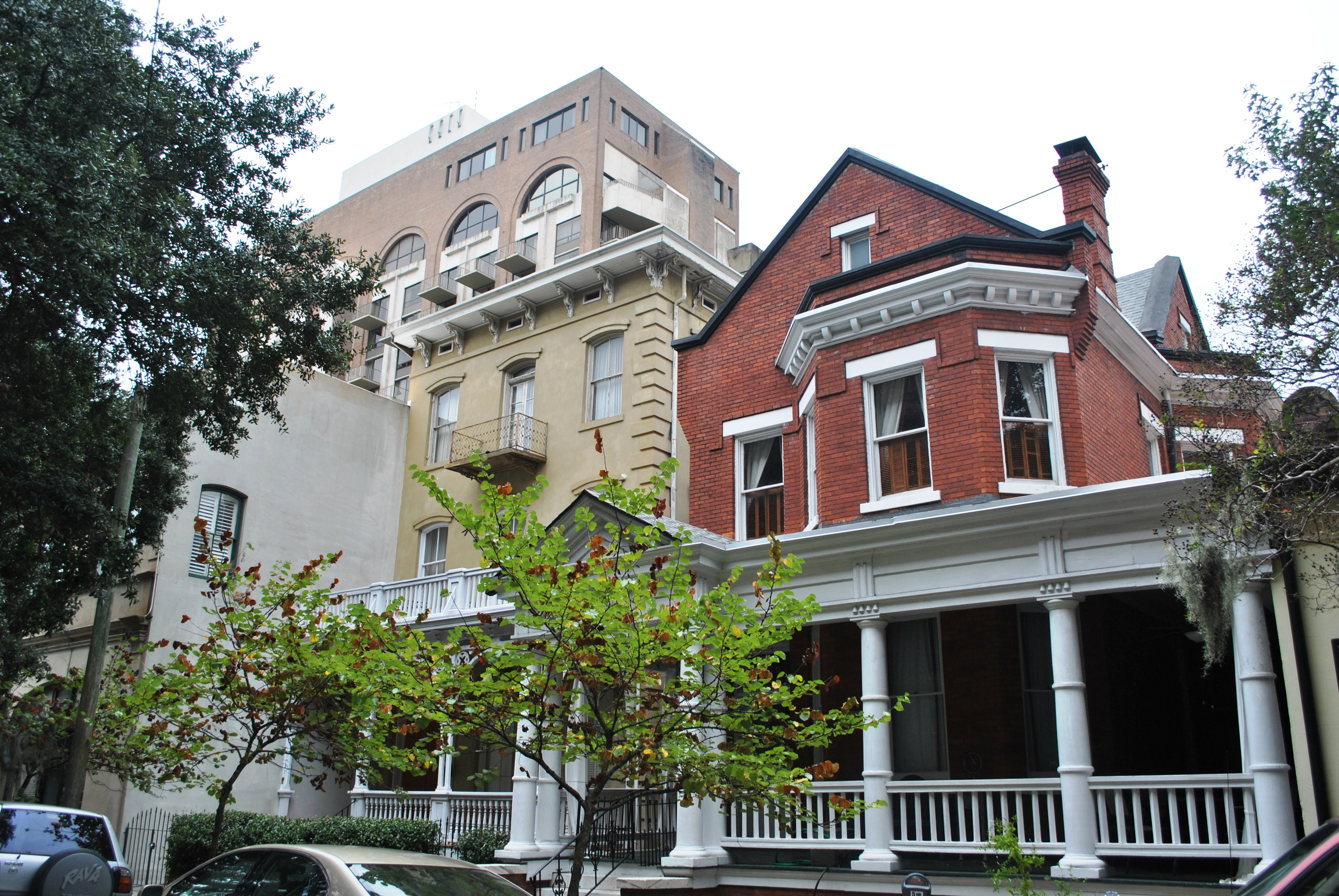
Centurian House, 106 East Harris Street

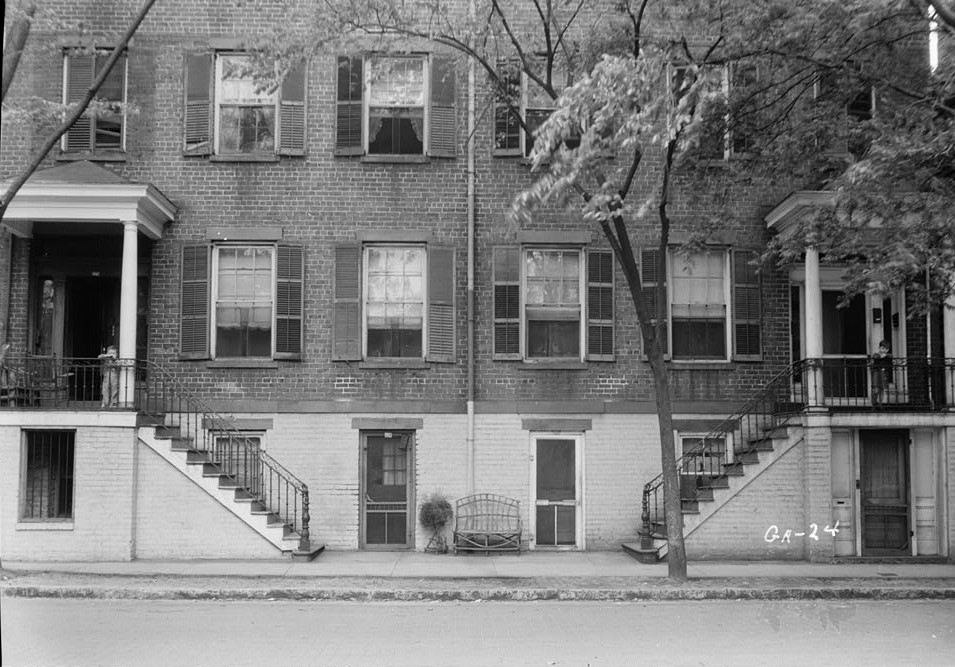
118 and 124 East Harris Street

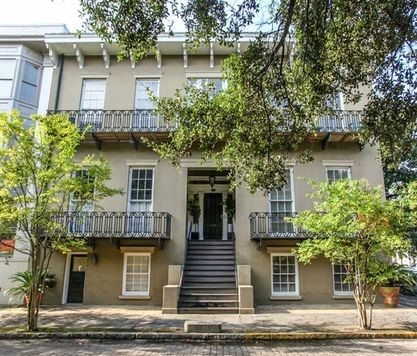
John B. Gallie House, 201–203 East Charlton Street
