= Marist Place =

Historic building in Savannah, Georgia, US

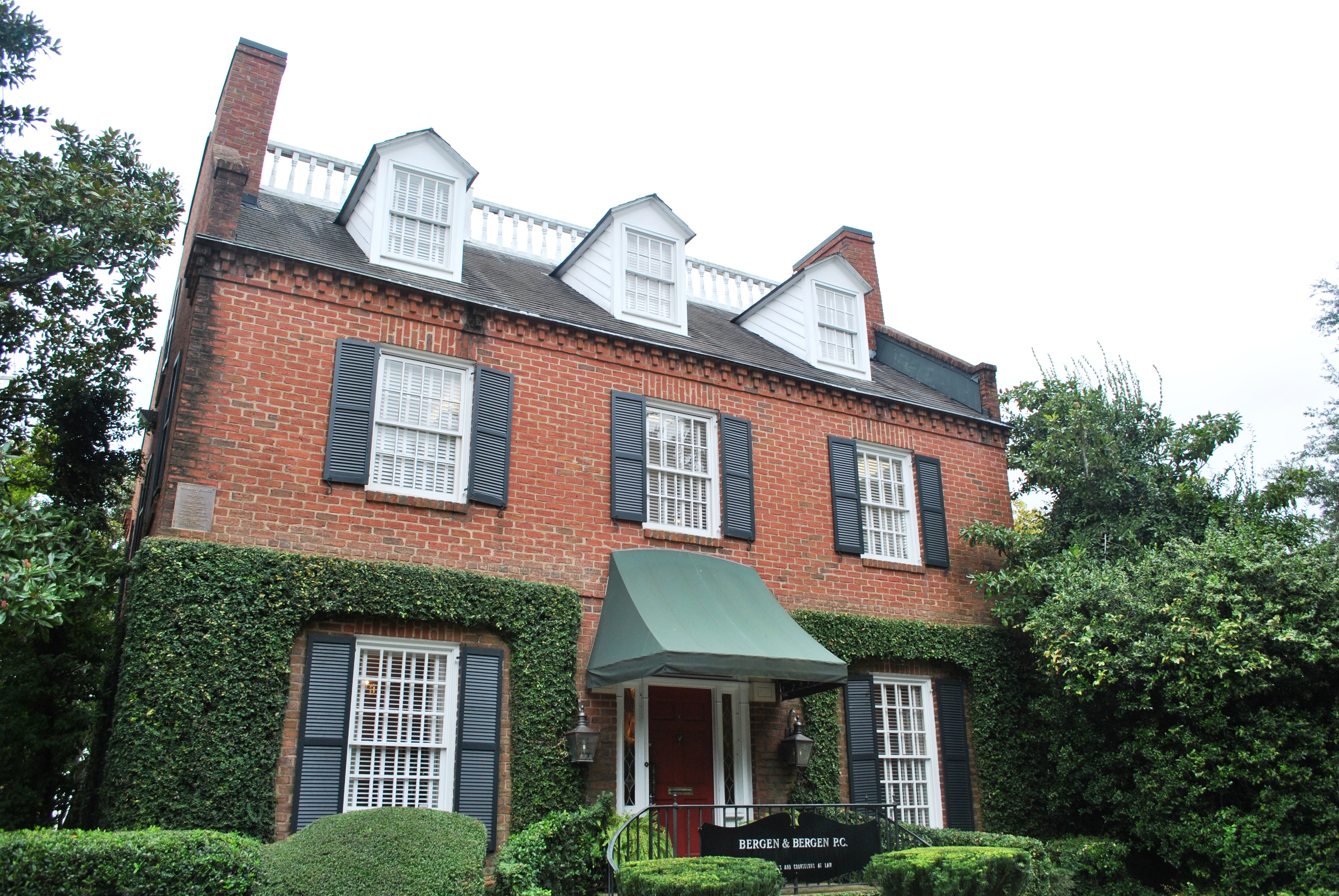
- The former site of the Marist School is now occupied by this building, pictured in 2013
- Interactive map of the Marist Place area

General information
- Location: Savannah, Georgia, United States, 123 East Charlton Street, Lafayette Square
- Coordinates: 32°04′21″N 81°05′32″W

Marist Place is the former location of a school building at today's 123 East Charlton Street in Savannah, Georgia, United States, in the southwest tything block of Lafayette Square. It was located in what became Savannah's Historic District.

The building was home to the Marist School for Boys between 1919 and 1939.

A plaque on the building, erected June 9, 1989, by Colonel Joseph B. Bergen, Class of 1939, reads:

The site of Marist School for Boys, 1919–1939, Grammar School Operated by Marist Brothers of the Schools: Last graduating class, June 9, 1939, Rev. Brother Eugene Bergeron, F.M.S., teacher; Reverend Brother Nicholas Whiteside, F.M.S., principal; Rev. Monsignor T. James McNamara, pastor, and Most Reverend Archbishop Gerald P. O’Hara, D.D., J.U.D., Bishop of Savannah-Atlanta.

== Gallery ==
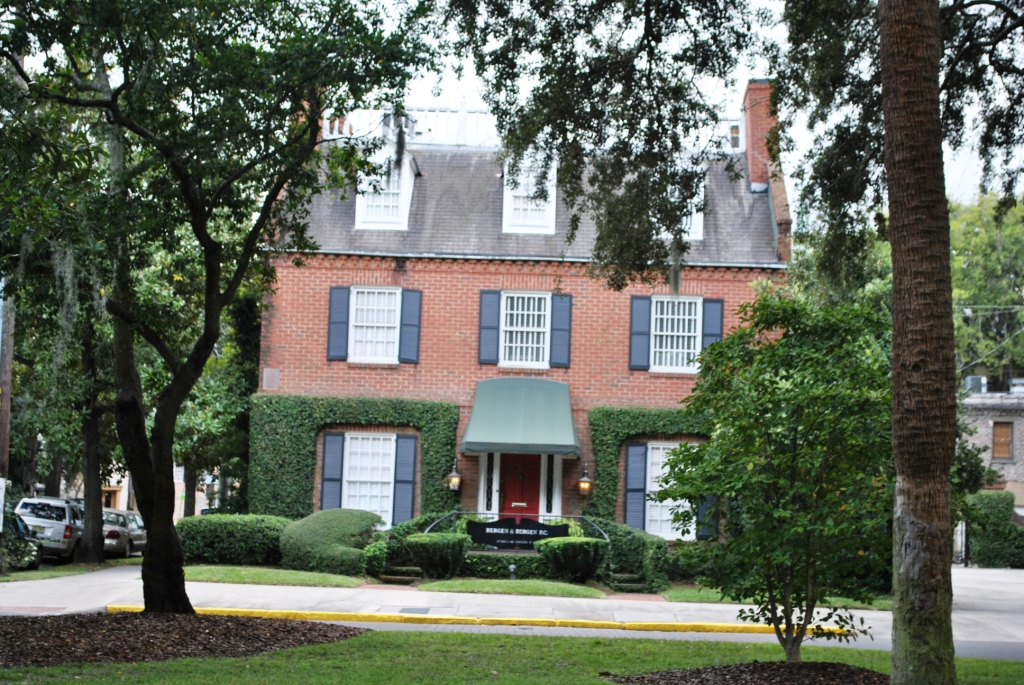
The building on the site today

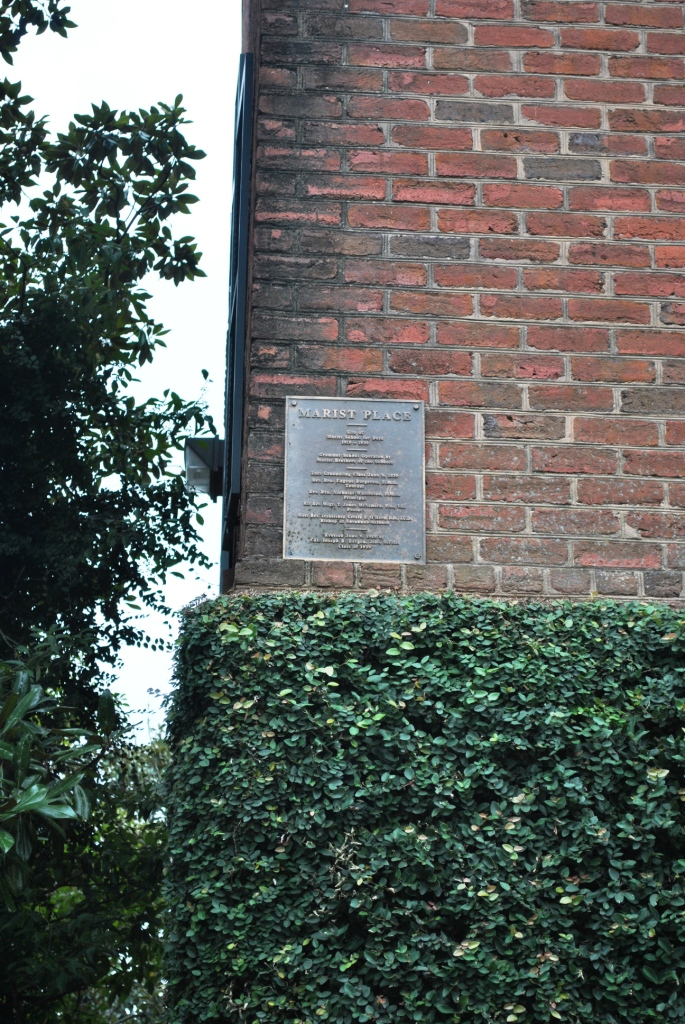
Plaque
