= Andrew Low House =

Historic house in Savannah, Georgia

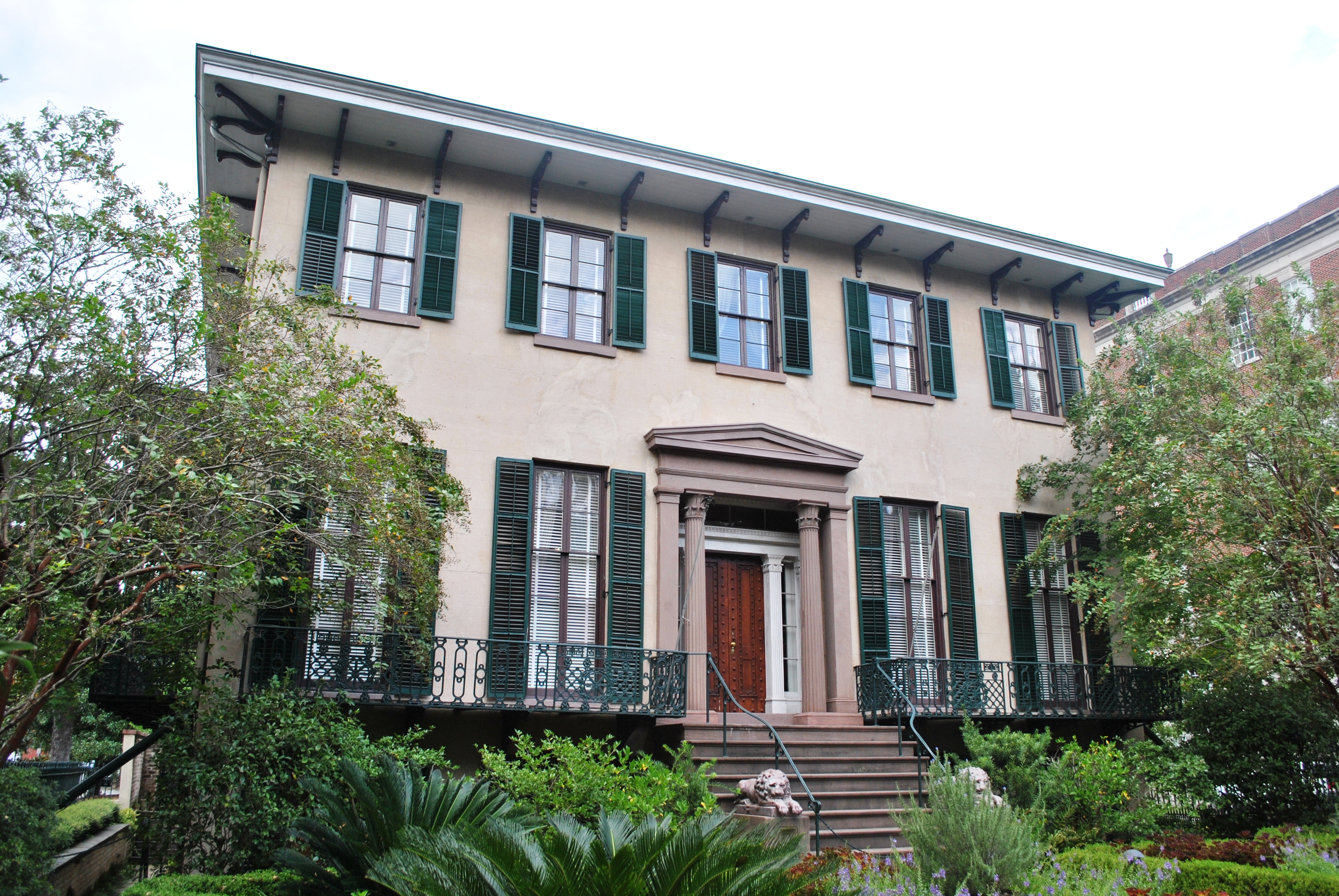
- The building in 2013
- Interactive map of the Andrew Low House area

General information
- Location: Savannah, Georgia, U.S., 329 Abercorn Street
- Coordinates: 32.07302°N 81.09246°W
- Completed: 1849 (177 years ago)

Technical details
- Floor count: 2

The Andrew Low House is a home in Savannah, Georgia, United States. Located at 329 Abercorn Street, in Lafayette Square, it was built by John S. Norris in 1849 and is part of the Savannah Historic District and of the Juliette Gordon Low Historic District. It is the oldest building on Lafayette Square.

Andrew Low was the father-in-law of Juliette Gordon Low, the founder of the Girl Scouts of the USA, and he inherited the house when his uncle died. He and his wife, Mary Cowper Stiles, maintained it as their American residence.

Its adjacent (to the west) carriage house, at 330 Drayton Street, served as the headquarters for the Girl Scouts until 1913.

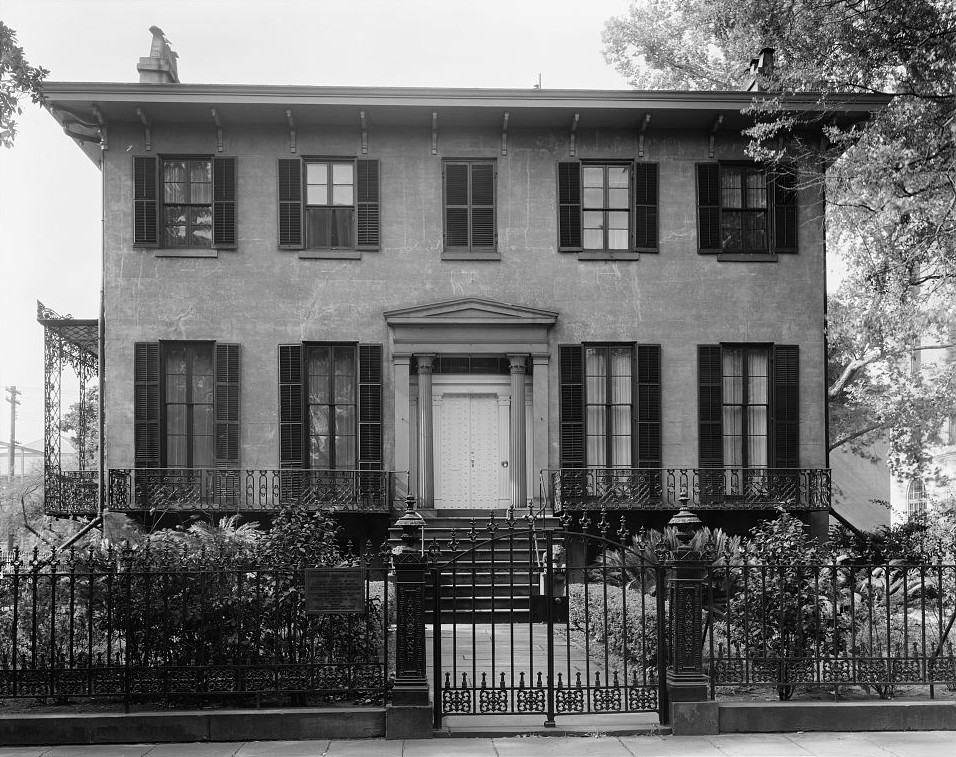
Pictured around 1939

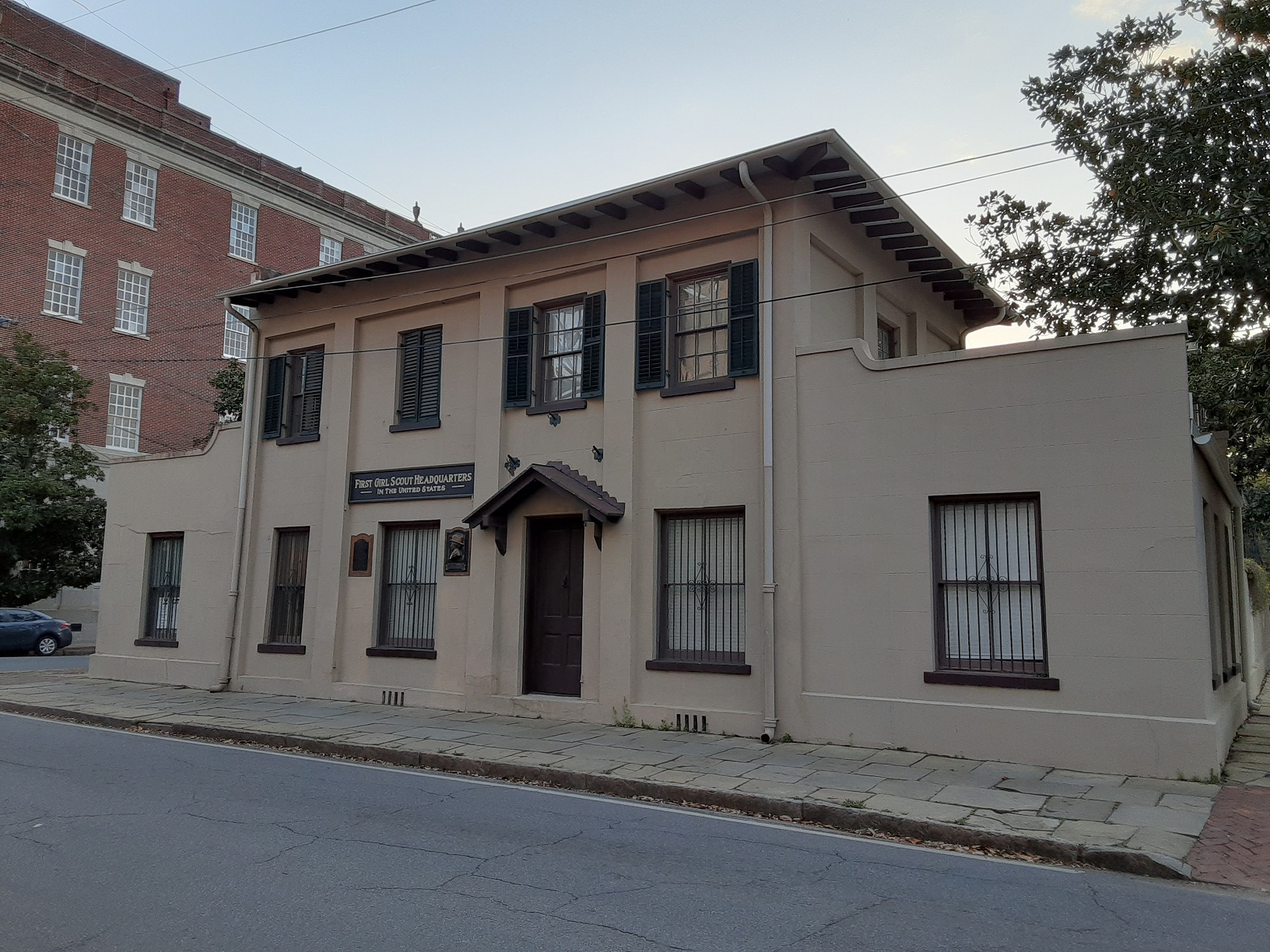
Carriage house (2022)

== See also ==
- Buildings in Savannah Historic District
