= Caroline Couper Stiles Lovell =

American artist and writer (1862–1947)

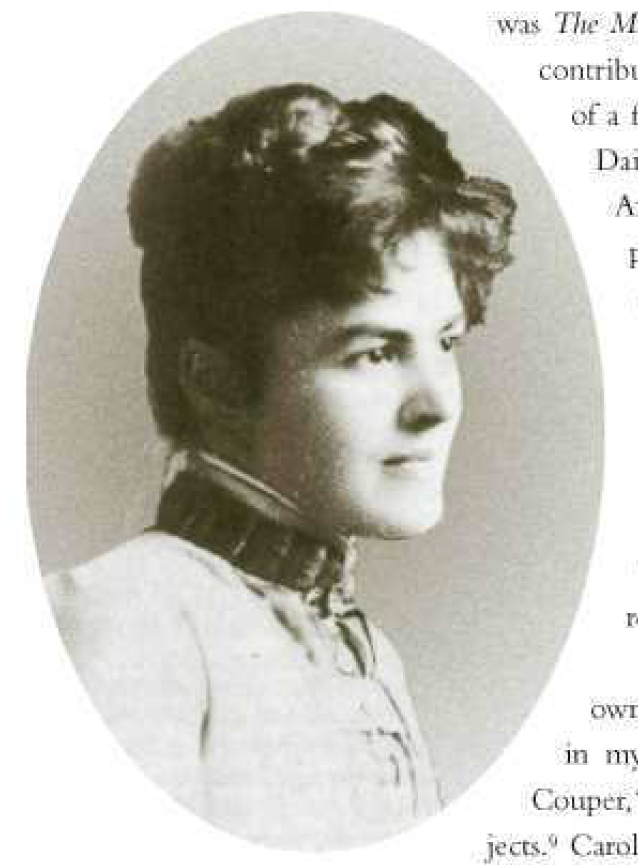
- Born: May 7, 1862; Bartow County
- Died: February 12, 1947 (aged 84); Savannah
- Occupation: Artist

Caroline Couper Stiles Lovell (May 7, 1862 – February 12, 1947) was an American artist and writer. She was a central figure in the cultural life of Birmingham, Alabama in the late 19th and early 20th century.

== Early life and education ==
Caroline Couper Stiles Lovell was born on May 7, 1862 at Etowah Cliffs, the Bartow County, Georgia plantation of her grandfather, William Henry Stiles. She was one of eight children of Robert Mackay Stiles, a merchant in Savannah, Georgia, and Margaret Wylly Couper, daughter of planter and slave owner James Hamilton Couper. Due to the American Civil War, Robert Stiles had sent his pregnant wife from coastal Savannah to inland Bartow County in northern Georgia.

Following the Civil War, Robert Stiles built a home near Etowah Cliffs he called Malbone, after his cousin, the painter Edward Greene Malbone. When Caroline was 12, her father died in a carriage accident, leaving her mother to raise the children. Her childhood was divided between Malbone and her aunts in Savannah, and her early schooling was at the Massie School and Oglethorpe Academy. She was an avid writer and artist as a child, even starting a family magazine called The Malbone Bouquet, largely created by her and her cousin Daisy Gordon.

At 15, she was sent to boarding school at Madame Lefebvre’s School in Baltimore, Maryland. There she received her first formal art lessons from a Mrs. Cuyler.

She returned to Georgia in 1882 and in 1884 married William Storrow Lowell, nicknamed "Tod", a grandson of John A. Quitman. Initially they lived on William Lowell's father's plantation near Natchez, Mississippi, but in 1888 they relocated to Birmingham, Alabama.

== Birmingham ==
That first year in Birmingham, Tod Lowell focused on building a successful business while she studied at the Art Students League of New York. Lovell's goal was to become a portrait painter, and she pursued miniature painting until eyestrain forced her to give in up in the early 1900s. Several of her miniatures are in the collection of the Birmingham Museum of Art. A series of full size paintings of young women by Lowell were published as a calendar by the Frederick Stokes Co. and used to illustrate the book Fair Women of Today by Samuel Minturn Peck.

In 1889, Lowell wrote and produced an operetta at O'Brien's Opera House called Prince Charming's Fate with a cast of children. The play was later reproduced in St. Nicholas Magazine. As her eyesight faded, she shifted her interest from painting to the stage in the form of tableau vivants, including Great Religions of the World (1909). She wrote a number of works for the stage: an adaptation of Wuthering Heights (1914), Swayam-Vara (1916), a one act comedy, The Dust of Death (1929), and Mirage (1929).

Lovell's civic activities included the Birmingham Art Club and the Birmingham Art League. She supported the art education of children and young artists, including forming two art schools: the Birmingham Art School and the Birmingham School of Art. She took 18 year old painter Lutie Sharpe to Paris for a year to study at the Académie Colarossi, and Lowell herself studied miniature painting there.

Lovell's time at the center of Birmingham culture came to an abrupt end in 1923, when her husband's business went bankrupt and they were forced to move back to Malbone. They returned to Birmingham in 1925 after her husband secured a position as a court clerk.

Lovell encouraged her uncle Charles Spalding Wylly to write his memoirs. After he died in 1923, Lovell edited them and included material from the letters and journals of other families, publishing the result as The Golden Isles of Georgia in 1932. It was acclaimed and won a prize from the Atlantic Monthly. She wrote her own memoirs, The Light of Other Days and The Bend of the River, but they remained unpublished until her brother's children published them as The Light of Other Days in 1995.

== Death ==
After her husband died in 1942, Caroline Couper Stiles Lovell moved to Savannah to live with her sisters, where she died on 12 February 1947.
