= 330 Drayton Street =

Historic house in Savannah, Georgia

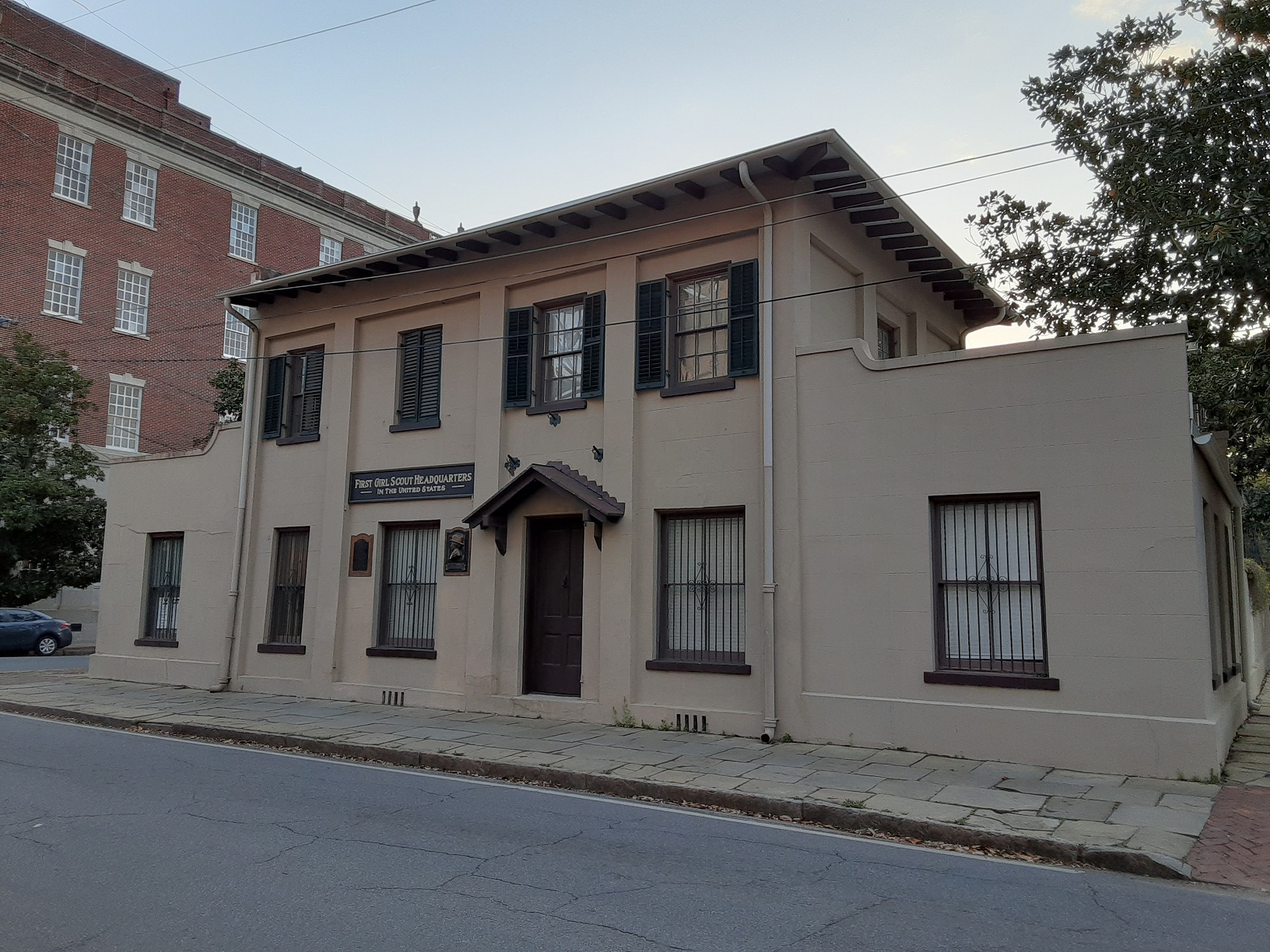
- The building in 2022
- Interactive map of the 330 Drayton Street area
- Alternative names: Andrew Low Carriage House

General information
- Location: Savannah, Georgia, U.S., 330 Drayton Street
- Coordinates: 32.07309°N 81.09278°W
- Completed: c. 1849 (177 years ago)

Technical details
- Floor count: 2

330 Drayton Street (also known as the Andrew Low Carriage House) is a building in Savannah, Georgia, United States. Located on Drayton Street, in Lafayette Square, it was built around 1849 and is part of the Savannah Historic District and of the Juliette Gordon Low Historic District.

Andrew Low was the father-in-law of Juliette Gordon Low, the founder of the Girls Scouts of the USA, and he inherited the adjacent house at 329 Abercorn Street when his uncle died.

The house served as the headquarters for the Girl Scouts until 1913. Low left the carriage house to the Savannah Area Girl Scout Council when she died in 1927; the Girl Scouts used the building until 1986.

The building was purchased by the National Society of the Colonial Dames of America in Georgia in 1928, after Low died. The society uses it as its state headquarters.

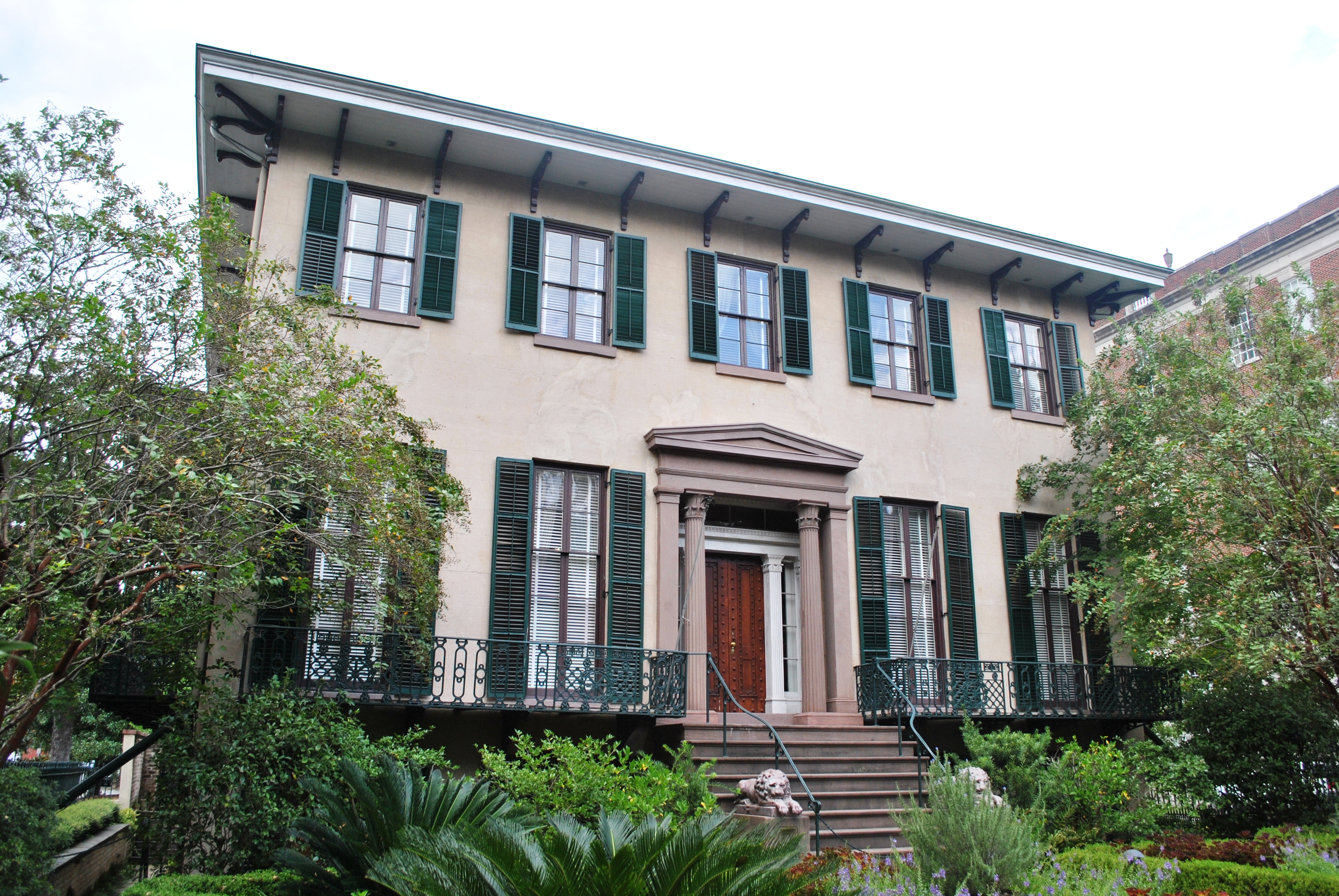
The Andrew Low House, at 329 Abercorn Street (2013)

== See also ==
- Buildings in Savannah Historic District
