= Juliette Gordon Low =

Founder of the Girl Scouts (1860–1927)

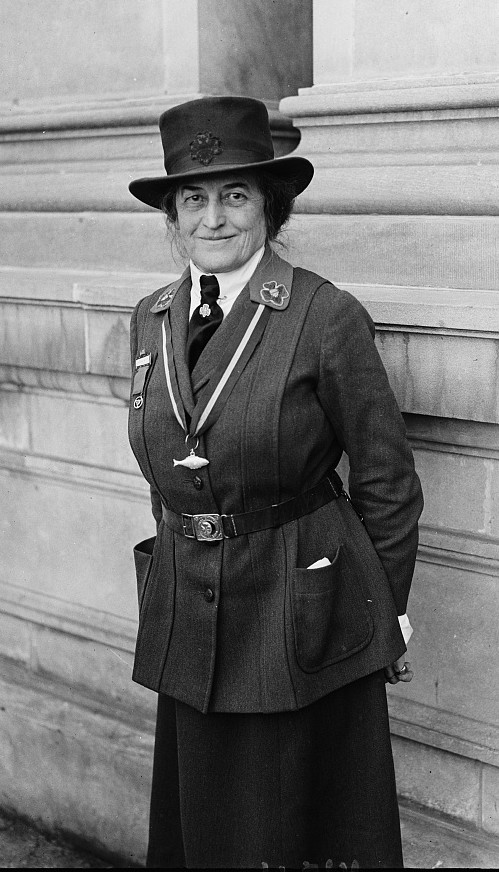
- Low in 1923
- Born: Juliette Magill Kinzie Gordon; October 31, 1860; Savannah, Georgia, U.S.
- Died: January 17, 1927 (aged 66); Savannah, Georgia, U.S.
- Resting place: Laurel Grove Cemetery
- Other name: Daisy Low
- Known for: Founder of the Girl Scouts of the USA
- Spouse: William Mackay Low (m. 1886; died 1905)
- Parent(s): William Washington Gordon II and Eleanor Lytle Kinzie
- Relatives: Juliette Augusta Magill Kinzie (grandmother); William Washington Gordon III (brother)

Juliette Gordon Low (née Gordon; October 31, 1860 – January 17, 1927) was the founder of Girl Scouts of the USA. Inspired by the work of Robert Baden-Powell, founder of the Scout Movement, she joined the Girl Guide movement in England, forming her own group of Girl Guides there in 1911.

In 1912, she returned to her native United States and established the country's first Girl Guide troop in Savannah, Georgia. In 1915, the United States' Girl Guides became known as the Girl Scouts, and Juliette Gordon Low was its first leader. She remained active until the time of her death.

Her birthday, October 31, is celebrated annually by the Girl Scouts as "Founder's Day".

== Early life ==
Juliette Magill Kinzie Gordon was born October 31, 1860, at 10 East Oglethorpe Avenue in Savannah, Georgia. She was named after her grandmother, Juliette Augusta Magill Kinzie, and nicknamed Daisy, a common sobriquet at the time, by her uncle. She was the second of six children born to William Washington Gordon II, a cotton broker with the firm Tison & Gordon, which was later renamed W. W. Gordon & Company, and Eleanor "Nellie" Lytle Kinzie, a writer whose family played a role in the founding of Chicago. Her brother, William Washington Gordon III, was also major in the United States Army.

When she was six months old, Gordon's father joined the Confederate States Army to fight in the American Civil War. In 1864, due to the proximity of Union troops to Savannah, she moved with her mother and two sisters to nearby Thunderbolt. After the Union victory in Savannah the same year, her family received many visits from General William T. Sherman, who was a friend of her uncle. Sherman arranged an escort to take her family to Chicago in March 1865. Upon arriving in Chicago, Gordon became sick with brain fever, although she recovered without severe complications. A few months later, after President Andrew Johnson issued the amnesty proclamation, her father reunited with the family to move back to Savannah.

As a young child, she was accident-prone and had numerous injuries and illnesses. In 1866, her mother mentioned in a letter that "Daisy fell out of bed – on her head, as usual...." That same year, she broke two of her fingers so severely that her parents considered having them amputated. She also had frequent earaches and recurring bouts of malaria.

Gordon developed partial hearing loss as a child. At her wedding, a grain of rice thrown in celebration landed in her left ear and led to an infection. Its removal punctured her ear drum, leading to permanent deafness in that ear.

=== Hobbies ===
As a child, Gordon spent more time on art and poetry than on school work. In addition to writing and performing plays, she started a newspaper, the Malbone Bouquet, with her cousins which featured some of her early poetry. She also formed The Helpful Hands Club with her cousins, with the goal of helping others. The members learned to sew and tried to make clothes for the children of Italian immigrants. She was dubbed "Crazy Daisy" by her family and friends, due to her eccentricities. As her cousin Caroline described her: "While you never knew what she would do next, she always did what she made up her mind to do."

=== Education ===
Gordon's parents raised her with traditional Southern values, emphasizing the importance of duty, obedience, loyalty, and respect. By the age of 12, she had begun boarding school, attending several different ones during her teen years, including Miss Emmett's School in New Jersey, the Virginia Female Institute, the Edgehill School, and Mesdemoiselles Charbonniers, a French finishing school in New York. While studying at Edgehill, she joined the secret group Theta Tau (based on the sorority of the same name), whose members held meetings and earned badges. In 1880, after finishing boarding school, she took painting lessons in New York, with teachers including Robert Walter Weir, a prominent landscape painter.

== Personal life ==
=== Marriage ===
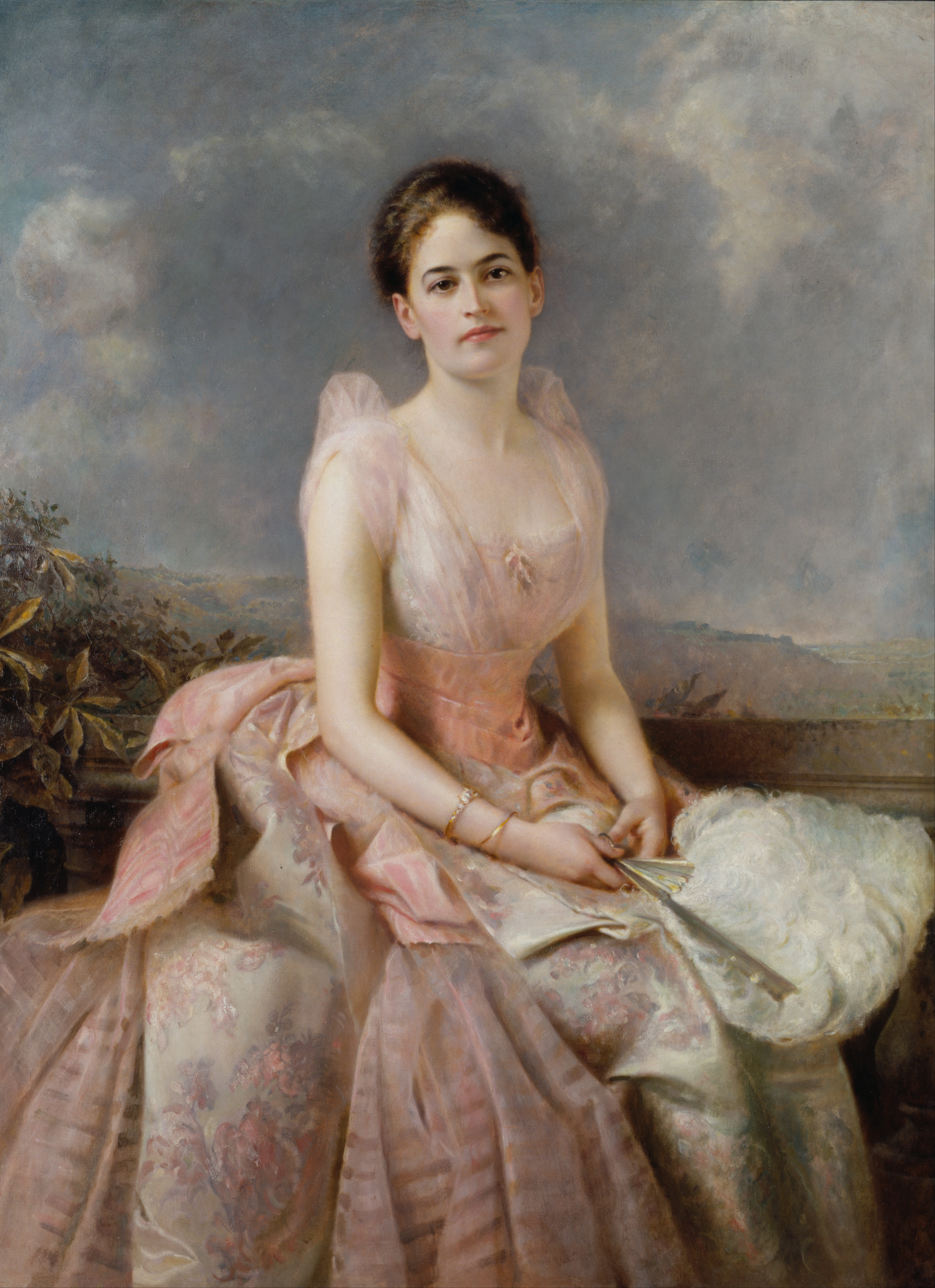
Low in 1887 by Edward Hughes

After the death of her 17-year-old sister Alice, in 1880, Gordon relocated to Savannah to take over household duties while her mother grieved. During this period, she met William Mackay Low, the son of a family friend, and they began courting in secret. Low left Savannah to study at the University of Oxford, and they did not meet again until almost three years later, in 1884. Gordon had traveled to Europe in the interim and learned several new skills, including shorthand, bareback riding, and hunting partridge. In late 1885, Low proposed marriage.

The Lows' wedding in Savannah on December 21, 1886, coincided with her parents' wedding anniversary. The couple honeymooned at St. Catherines Island near Savannah. Then they leased property in London and Scotland, spending the social season in London and the hunting season in Scotland. They spent much of their first two years of marriage apart, due to Juliette's medical problems and William's long hunting trips and gambling. The long separations, combined with her inability to bear children strained their relationship.

Low often painted, but also learned woodworking and metalworking. She even designed and built iron gates for her home in Warwickshire. As a hostess, she held parties and events at the house and also received visits from such illustrious guests as her husband's friend Albert Edward, the Prince of Wales, and the writer Rudyard Kipling, whose wife was related to her mother. Despite her husband's opposition, she devoted time to charity work, including regular visits to a woman with leprosy; she also fed and cared for the poor in a nearby village, and joined the local nursing association.

=== Separation ===
By 1895, Low was growing increasingly unhappy in her marriage. She rarely spent time alone with her husband, who had grown distant and began having affairs and drinking heavily.

In 1901, Anna Bridges Bateman, the widow of Sir Hugh Alleyne Sacheverell-Bateman, stayed as a guest at the Lows' home in Scotland. Upon discovering her husband's affair with Bateman, Low left to stay with friends and family. She worried that he planned to divorce her, so she sent him a telegram asking for a year before making any final decisions. Although he did not initially favor divorce or separation, a year later he wrote to her to ask that they live apart permanently, and she agreed.

William soon began withholding money from Juliette unless she agreed to a divorce. After consulting a lawyer, she learned that for a divorce to be granted, she would need to prove adultery and desertion, or adultery and cruelty. In the case of adultery, Bateman would need to be named, which would have social repercussions for all parties involved. This slowed the divorce proceedings.

In late 1902, Low received money from her husband for the first time in two years. She used it and her savings to rent a house in London. William committed to a support agreement in 1903, which was to award her £2,500 a year, the Low home in Savannah, and stocks and securities. Later that year, she purchased her own home in London, along with the house next door, which she rented out for income.

After her husband had what may have been a stroke, Low temporarily called off the dissolution of their marriage. She considered it wrong to divorce him when he could not defend himself. The proceedings resumed in January 1905 once his condition improved. William died from a seizure in Wales on June 8, 1905, before the divorce was finalized. After the funeral, it was revealed that he had left almost everything to Bateman, and that he had revoked his 1903 support deal with his widow. William's sisters contested the will, with the support of Low, who ultimately received a sum of money, the Low house in Savannah with its surrounding land, and stocks and securities.

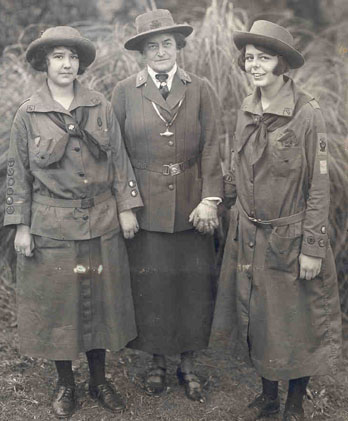
Low (center) standing with two Girl Scouts, Robertine McClendon (left) and Helen Ross (right)

== Girl Guides ==
After her husband's death, Low traveled, took sculpting classes, and did charity work while looking for a project on which to focus her time and skills. In May 1911, she met Sir Robert Baden-Powell at a party, and was inspired by the Boy Scouts, a program that he had organized. With 40,000 members throughout Europe and the United States, at the time, it stressed the importance of both military preparedness and having fun, two values she appreciated. Low met Baden-Powell a dozen times during the rest of 1911.

Following that introduction, Low was inspired to become involved with the Girl Guides, headed by Agnes Baden-Powell, Robert's sister. In August 1911, she formed a Girl Guides patrol near her home in Scotland, where she encouraged the members to become self-sufficient by learning how to spin wool and care for livestock. She also taught them knot tying, map reading, knitting, cooking, and first aid, while her friends in the military instructed them in drilling, signaling, and camping. She organized two new Girl Guides patrols in London when she visited for the winter of 1911.

=== Start of the American Girl Guides ===
In 1912, Low returned to the United States, and just happened to be on the same ship as Robert Baden-Powell, who was on the first leg of a round-the-world tour to encourage the Scout Movement. Low hoped to bring Girl Guiding to her hometown, Savannah, to help girls learn practical skills and build character. When she arrived, she called her cousin Nina Pape, a local educator, saying, "I've got something for the girls of Savannah, and all America, and all the world, and we're going to start it tonight." Soon after, in March 1912, Low formed the first two American Girl Guides patrols, registering 18 girls.

The early growth of the movement in the United States was due to Low's extensive social connections and early work to recruit new members and leaders, among them her family and friends. She also advertised in newspapers and magazines. Baden-Powell put her in touch with people interested in Girl Guiding, including Louise Carnegie. After forming the first American troops, Low described herself as "deep in Girl Guides", and, by the next year, she had released the first American Girl Guides manual, entitled How Girls Can Help Their Country, a slightly amended version of Agnes B-P's book, How Girls Can Help to Build Up the Empire, itself based on Scouting for Boys by Robert Baden-Powell.

Low established the first headquarters in a remodeled carriage house at 330 Drayton Street in Savannah, behind the home she had inherited from her husband. The headquarters contained meeting rooms for the local Girl Guide patrols, while the lot outside provided space for marching or signaling drills and sports, including basketball. Edmund Strudwick Nash, who rented the main house from Low, offered to pay rent on the carriage house as his contribution to the organization, becoming one of the American Girl Guide's first benefactors. Nash's son, Ogden Nash, immortalized "Mrs Low's House" in one of his poems.

Low traveled along the East Coast, spreading Girl Guiding to other communities, before returning to Savannah to speak with President William Taft, who would be visiting her home. She hoped to convince him that his daughter, Helen, should become a patron for the Girl Guides, but was unsuccessful.

== American Girl Scouts ==
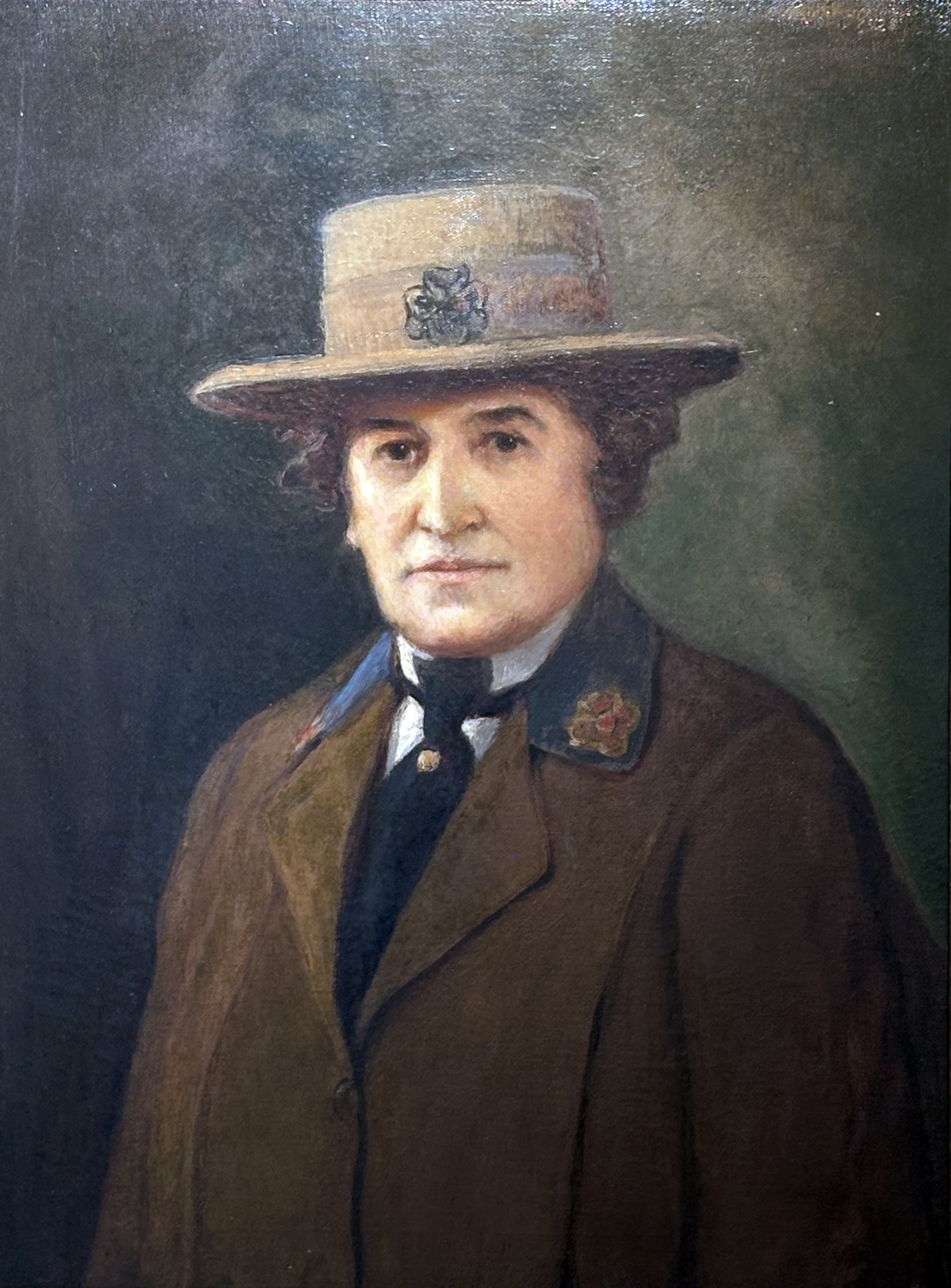
Portrait of Low located at the Girl Scout First Headquarters historic site and museum

Many competing organizations for girls that claimed to be the closest model to Boy Scouting were forming, and Low believed that gaining support from prominent people would help legitimize her organization as the official sister organization to the Boy Scouts. Her biggest competition was the Camp Fire Girls, which was formed in part by James E. West, the chief executive of the Boy Scouts of America and a strong proponent of strict gender roles. In March 1912, Low wrote to the Camp Fire Girls, inviting them to merge into the Girl Guides, but they declined even after Baden-Powell suggested that they reconsider. West considered many of the Girl Guides activities to be gender-inappropriate, and he was concerned that the public would question the masculinity of the Boy Scouts if the girls participated in similar activities.

=== Renaming the organization ===
Although the Girl Guides were growing, the Camp Fire Girls were doing so at a faster rate, so Low traveled to England to seek counsel from the British Girl Guides. By the time she returned to America, in 1913, she had a plan to spread Girl Guiding nationwide by changing the name from Girl Guides to Girl Scouts, establishing a national headquarters, and recruiting patrons outside Georgia. Upon returning to Savannah, she learned that the Savannah Girl Guides had already renamed themselves to Girl Scouts because "Scout" reminded them of America's pioneer ancestry. West objected to the name change, saying that it trivialized the name of scout and would cause older Boy Scouts to quit. Baden-Powell supported Low's use of the term "scout", although he preferred the term "guide" for the British Girl Guides.

In 1913, Low set up the Girl Scouts national headquarters in Washington, D.C., and hired her friend Edith Johnston as National Executive Secretary. The national headquarters served as the "central information dispenser" for Girl Scouting, as well as the place where girls could purchase their badges and the newly published handbook, How Girls Can Help Their Country.

Low recruited leaders and members in various states and spoke with every group that she could. Around the same time, she designed and patented the trefoil badge, although West claimed that the trefoil belonged to the Boy Scouts and the Girl Scouts had no right using it. She traveled back to London in the summer, where she met King George V and Queen Mary, and received the Girl Guide Thanks Badge from Princess Louise for promoting Guiding.

Low also formed the Honorary Committee of Girl Scouts and elected her family and friends to the committee. By using her connections, she was able to convince Susan Ludlow Parish, Mina Miller Edison (Eleanor Roosevelt's godmother), the wife of Thomas Edison, and Bertha Woodward (the wife of the House of Representatives majority leader), to become patrons. Although she had received support from many patrons, Low still funded most Girl Scout expenses herself.

=== World War I ===
At the start of World War I, Low rented Castle Menzies, in Perthshire, Scotland, and let a family of Belgian refugees move in temporarily.

On February 13, 1915, she sailed back to the United States on the RMS Lusitania. When she arrived, she continued her work for the Girl Scouts. At the time, the organization had 73 patrons and 2,400 registered members. Low decided to build a stronger central organization for the Girl Scouts by writing a new constitution that formed an executive committee and a National Council. She held the first National Council meeting under the new name, Girl Scouts, Inc. on June 10, 1915, and was elected the organization's founding president.

The Girl Scouts expanded after the United States entered World War I. Gordon Low publicized the Girl Scouts through newspapers, magazines, events, and film. In 1916, she relocated Girl Scout headquarters from Washington, D.C., to New York City. The same year, she returned to England to fundraise and open a home for relatives of wounded soldiers, where she volunteered three nights per week. By November, she was back in the United States, continuing her work with the Girl Scouts.

In response to the thrift program, enacted by the United States Food Administration with the goal of teaching women how to conserve food, Girl Scouts in Washington, D.C., began growing and harvesting their own food and canning perishable goods. Herbert Hoover wrote to Low, thanking her for the contributions of the Girl Scouts and expressing hope that others would follow suit. She responded by organizing Girl Scouts to help the Red Cross by making surgical dressings and knitting clothing for soldiers. They also picked oakum, swept workrooms, created scrapbooks for wounded soldiers, and made smokeless trench candles for soldiers to heat their food.

By the end of 1917, Low convinced Lou Henry Hoover to become the Girl Scouts' National Vice President and Edith Bolling Galt Wilson, President Woodrow Wilson's second wife, to become its Honorary President.

=== Expanding internationally ===
Following World War I, interest in the Girl Guides began to increase in many different countries. In response, Olave Baden-Powell, the Chief Guide, created the International Council of Girl Guides and Girl Scouts as a way to bring together the different communities of Guides and Scouts across the world. The first meeting took place at the Girl Guide headquarters in London, which Low attended as the United States representative.

Low stepped down as the National President of the Girl Scouts in 1920 to devote more of her time to promoting Guiding and Scouting internationally. She attended as many meetings of the International Council as she could, and underwrote the travel of foreign delegates, so that they could also attend. And she assisted Olave Baden-Powell in converting 65 acres (26 ha) of land into a campsite for the Girl Guides. Low furnished a bungalow near the main house and named it "The Link" to signify the bond between the British Girl Guides and the American Girl Scouts.

While no longer the president, Low remained an active presence in the organization. She worked on and appeared in The Golden Eaglet, the first Girl Scout movie. At a fundraising campaign in New York during Girl Scout Week, she dropped pamphlets onto a crowd of people from an airplane. On October 31, that same week, the Girl Scouts celebrated the first Founder's Day, a day to honor Low and her accomplishments. In 1922, the Girl Scout convention took place in Savannah. She helped plan and organize the convention by renting an auditorium, arranging for appearances by professional athletes, the mayor, and the school superintendent, and hiring a film company. After the 1922 convention, she began planning Cloudlands, a camping facility in Cloudland, Georgia, designed to train leaders and girls together. Cloudlands was later renamed Camp Juliette Low.

== Death ==
Low developed breast cancer in 1923 but kept it a secret. She caught the flu after an operation to remove the malignant lumps, leaving her bed-ridden until February 1924. When she recovered, she resumed her work with the American Girl Scouts and the International Council. She secretly had two more operations to try to cure her cancer, but was informed in 1925 that she had about six months to live. She continued to do work for the Girl Scouts, and even sneaked away during her recovery from surgery to make a speech at the organization's regional conference in Richmond, Virginia.

Low traveled to Liverpool, England, where Dr. William Blair-Bell was developing a treatment for cancer. She tried it, an IV containing a solution of colloidal lead. The treatment was unsuccessful, and she spent her 66th birthday fighting off lead poisoning. She traveled back to the United States to meet with her doctor, who informed her that she did not have much longer to live. She went to the Low home in Savannah, where she spent her last few months. Low died in Savannah in 1927, at the age of 66. An honor guard of Girl Scouts escorted her casket to her funeral at Christ Church the next day. 250 Girl Scouts left school early that day to attend her funeral and burial at Laurel Grove Cemetery. Low was buried in her Girl Scout uniform with a note in her pocket stating: "You are not only the first Girl Scout, but the best Girl Scout of them all." Her tombstone read, "Now abideth faith, hope, and love, but the greatest of these is love."

== Legacy ==
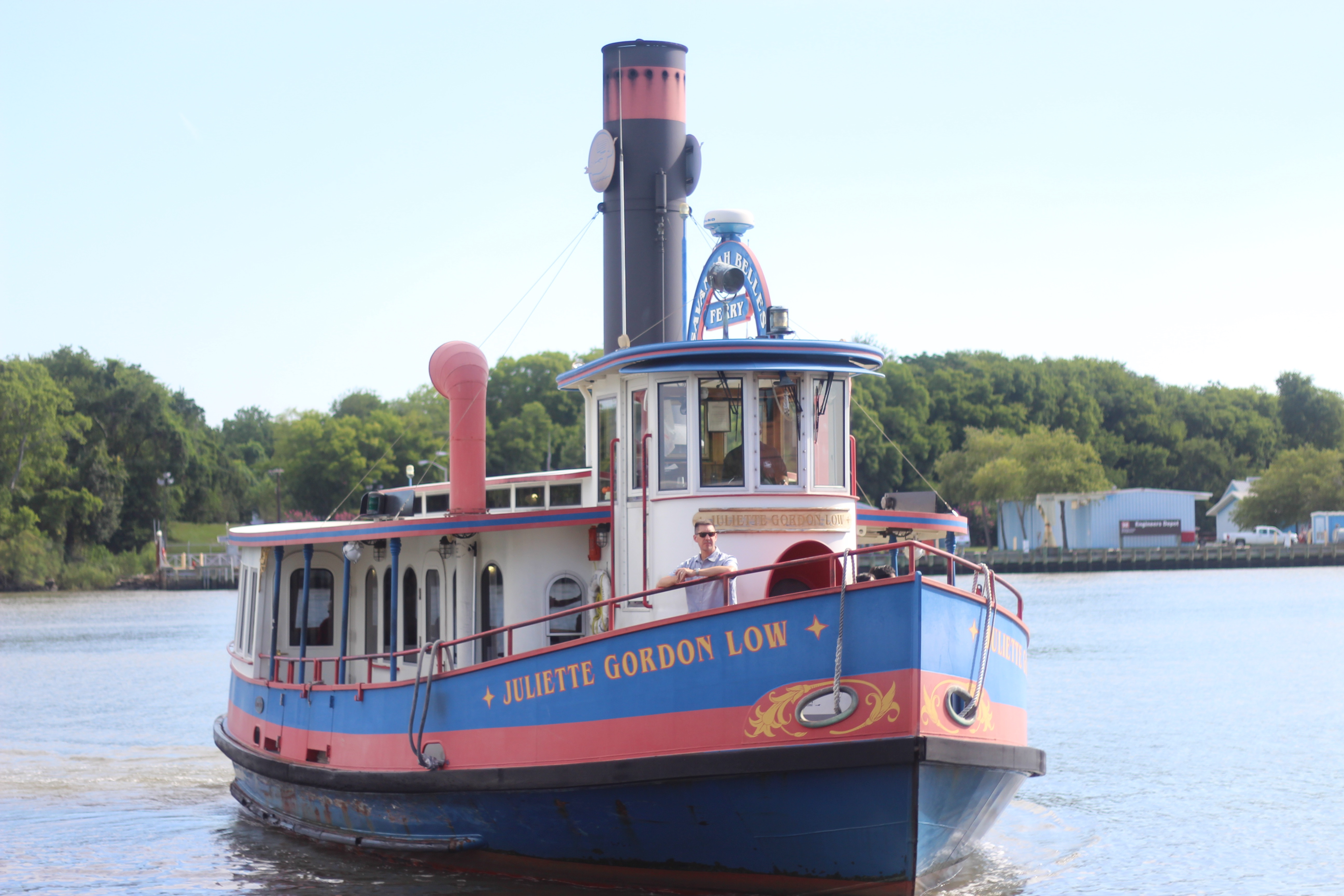
Savannah Belles Ferry in Savannah, Georgia.

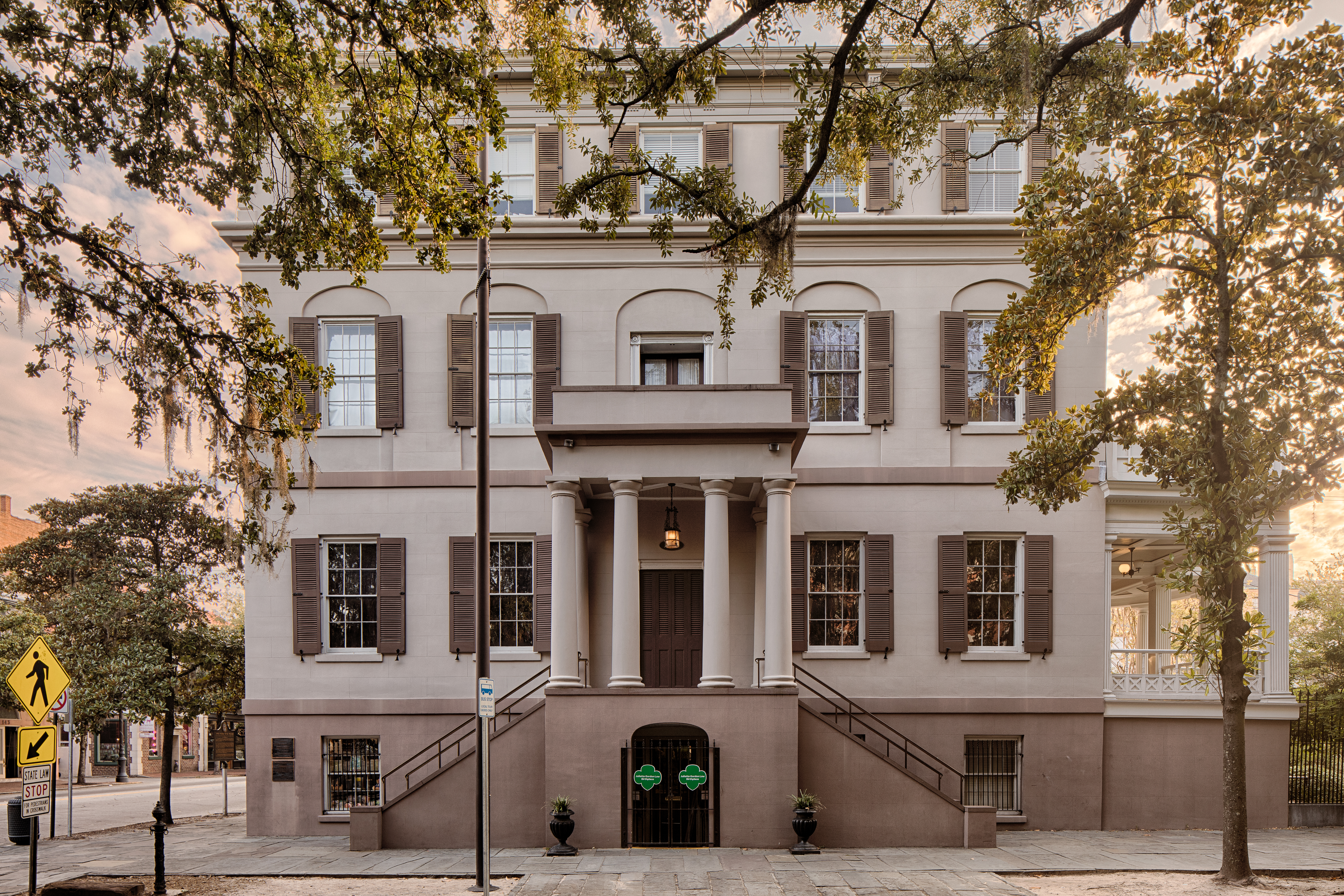
The Juliette Gordon Low Birthplace in Savannah, Georgia, is open for tours to the public.

In 1948, a postage stamp (Scott catalogue number 974) honoring Low was issued by the United States Postal Service. Over 63 million were printed, making it a common issue. At the time, the Post Office had a policy of not honoring civic organizations. It took a joint resolution of Congress, with the approval of President Harry S. Truman, to produce the stamp for her. (The National Postal Museum suggests that it may have helped that Bess Truman was honorary president of the Girl Scouts.)

Low's home in Savannah is visited by Girl Scouts from all over the world. In 1965, her birthplace was listed as a National Historic Landmark.

Low also donated a 7 acres (2.8 ha) park in Savannah which bears her name. The park (originally part of her family homestead, the remainder of which was developed into the Gordonston neighborhood, which includes a road named Kinzie Avenue, after Low's family) has been the center of long-running disputes between Gordonston residents and non-residents as to whether the park was donated to the residents of Gordonston, or to the residents of Savannah at large, even to the point of disagreement over the park's name. The park figures prominently in Karen Kingsbury's 2013 novel The Chance.

In 1979, Low was inducted into the National Women's Hall of Fame.

On May 29, 2012, the Girl Scouts' centennial anniversary was commemorated, with Low receiving the Presidential Medal of Freedom.

She was inducted into the Savannah Women of Vision investiture in 2016.

Camp Juliette Low in Cloudland, Georgia, bears the name of its founder.

Her birthday, October 31, is commemorated by the Girl Scouts each year as Founder's Day.

She was also awarded two patents, a utility patent for a "Liquid Container for Use with Garbage Cans or the Like", Patent 1,124,925, and a design patent, D45234, for the trefoil Girl Scout Badge.

In 1999, the City of Savannah named its ferry service the Savannah Belles Ferry after four of Savannah's notable women, including Low.

In 2016, the first official Girl Scout trail honoring Low was created by a Girl Scout for her Gold Award project. The trail is located in Westwinds Metropark in Holland, Ohio.

Low was honored on a U.S. quarter in 2025 as part of the final year of the American Women quarters program.

== See also ==
- Juliette Gordon Low Historic District
