= Juliette Gordon Low Historic District =

Historic district in Savannah, Georgia, US

- Juliette Gordon Low District
- U.S. National Register of Historic Places
- U.S. National Historic Landmark District
- U.S. National Historic Landmark District – Contributing property
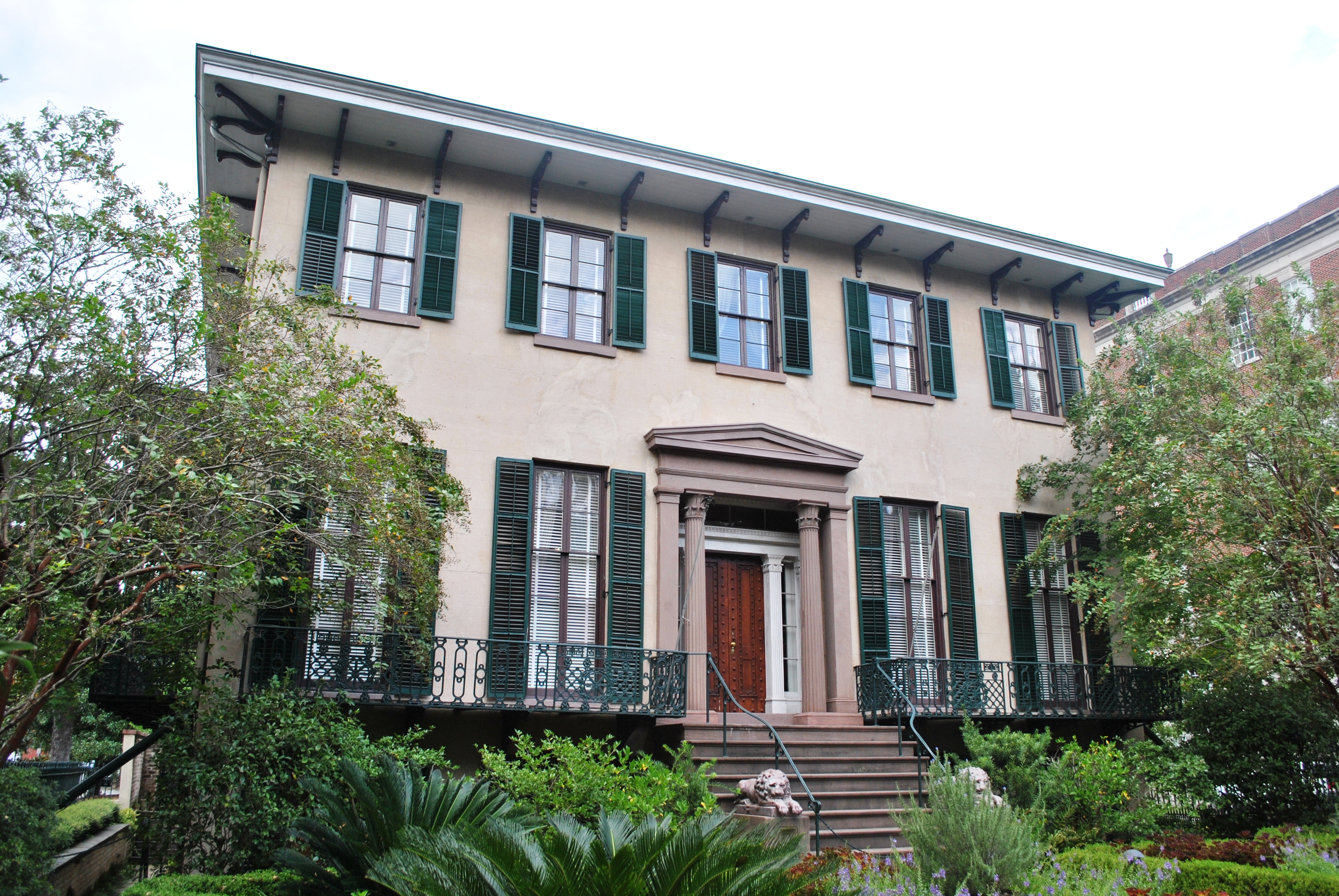
- Andrew Low House

- Location within Georgia Location within the United States
- Location: 10 East Oglethorpe Avenue, 330 Drayton Street, 329 Abercorn Street, Savannah, Georgia, US
- Coordinates: 32°4′37″N 81°5′33″W
- Built: 1818
- Architect: John S. Norris
- Architectural style: Early Republic, Italianate
- Part of: Savannah Historic District (ID66000277)
- NRHP reference No.: 66000276

Significant dates
- Added to NRHP: October 15, 1966
- Designated NHLD: June 23, 1965

The Juliette Gordon Low Historic District consists of three buildings in Savannah, Georgia, United States, which are associated with the origins of the Girl Scouts of the USA. They are the birthplace of Juliette Gordon Low, at 10 East Oglethorpe Avenue; the Andrew Low House, at 329 Abercorn Street; and the Andrew Low Carriage House (also known as the First Girl Scout Headquarters), at 330 Drayton Street.

The birthplace and headquarters was designated a National Historic Landmark in 1965. The Andrew Low house, where Juliette lived with her husband, was a later addition to the National Register application, creating the Juliette Gordon Low Landmark District in 1966. These properties are also contributing properties to the Savannah Historic District.

== History ==
The Juliette Gordon Low Birthplace, also known as the Wayne–Gordon House, was built in 1820 for James Moore Wayne, then-mayor of Savannah. Wayne moved to Washington, D.C., when he was appointed to fill an unexpired term in the United States House of Representatives and, then, to serve on the Supreme Court of the United States.

Low was born in the house on October 31, 1860, and spent her childhood there.

The Andrew Low House was owned by Low's father-in-law, Andrew Low. William Low inherited the house when his father died and the couple maintained it as their American residence.

Still living in England after her husband died in 1905, Low met Robert Baden Powell, founder of the Boy Scouts, and his sister, Agnes, who oversaw the Girl Guides. Baden Powell recruited Low to become involved in the Girl Guides in 1911, and she returned to Savannah to start the movement in the United States in 1912. In March 1912, Low talked to her cousin, teacher Nina Anderson Pape, about forming Girl Guide troops in Savannah. Low and some girls met informally at the Wayne-Gordan House in March 1912. Low organized the first Girl Guides troop on March 12, 1912, at the Andrew Low House; the group became the Girl Scouts in 1913.

The Andrew Low Carriage House, at the rear (to the west) of the main house, at 330 Drayton Street, served as the headquarters for the Girl Scouts until 1913. Low left the carriage house to the Savannah Area Girl Scout Council when she died in 1927; the Girl Scouts used the building until 1986.

The Andrew Low House was purchased by the National Society of the Colonial Dames of America in Georgia in 1928, after Low died. The society uses it as its state headquarters.

The Girl Scouts of the USA purchased the Birthplace from the Low family in 1953 and began an extensive renovation of the dilapidated building. In 1956, Savannah landscape architect Clermont Huger Lee created a courtyard and garden design for the site in the style of a Victorian parterre garden. Opened in 1956 as a historic house museum, the Birthplace features many original Gordon family furnishings, including art by Low. The museum interprets Low's life and the history of the Girl Scouts.

== Architecture ==
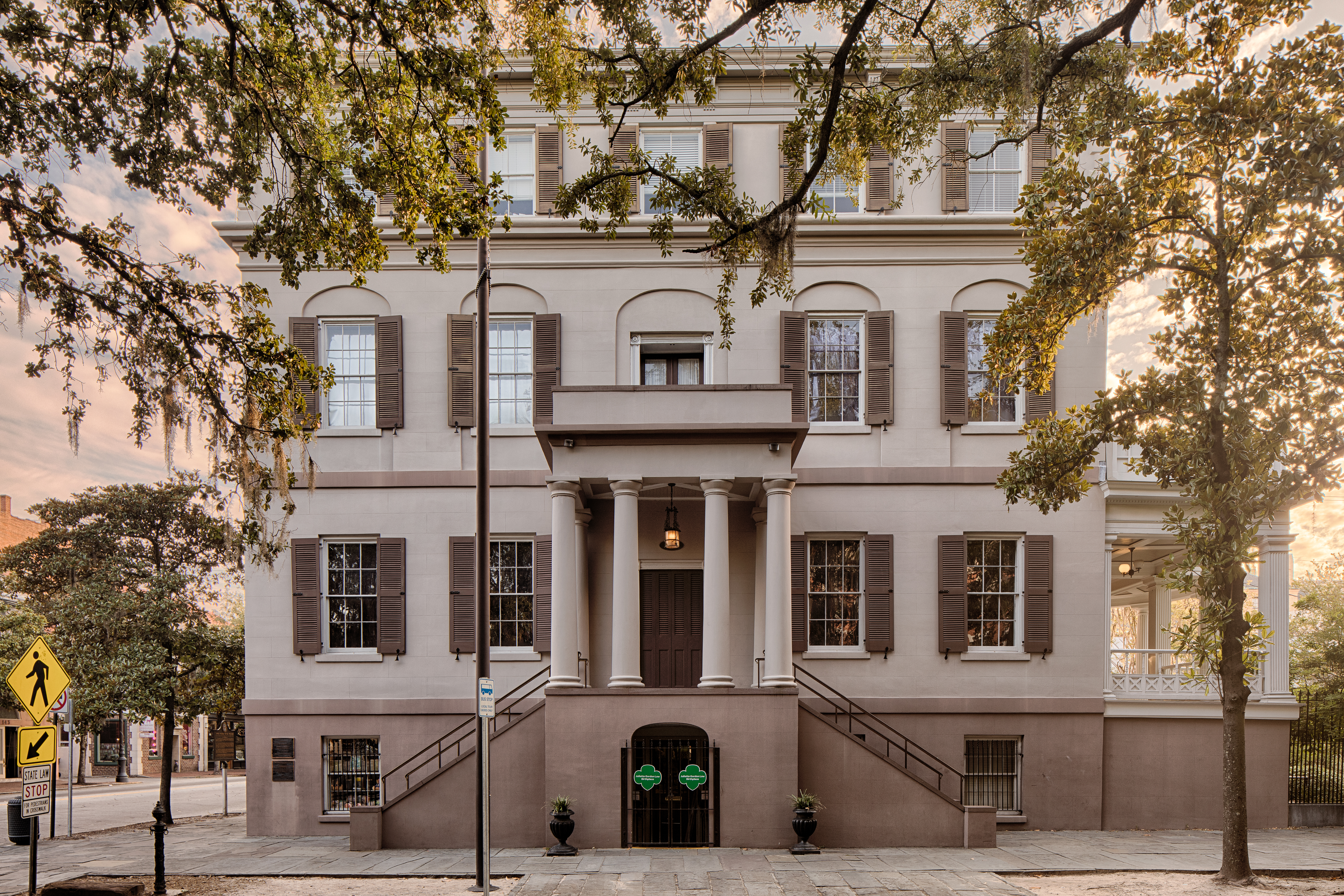
Wayne–Gordon House, 2019

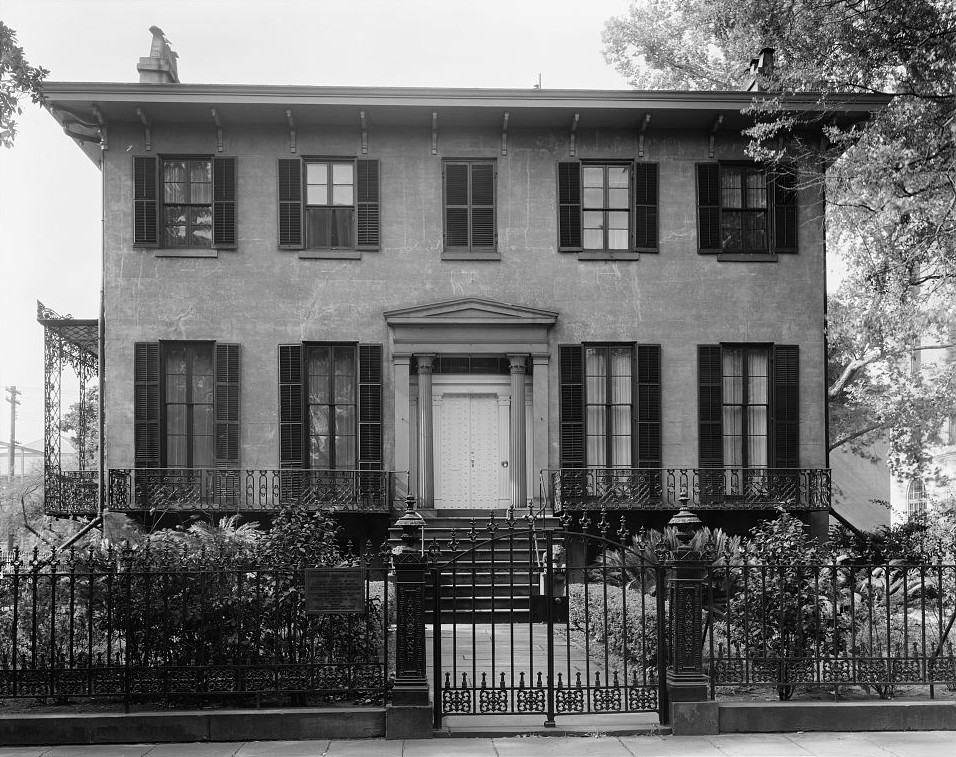
Andrew Low House, circa 1939

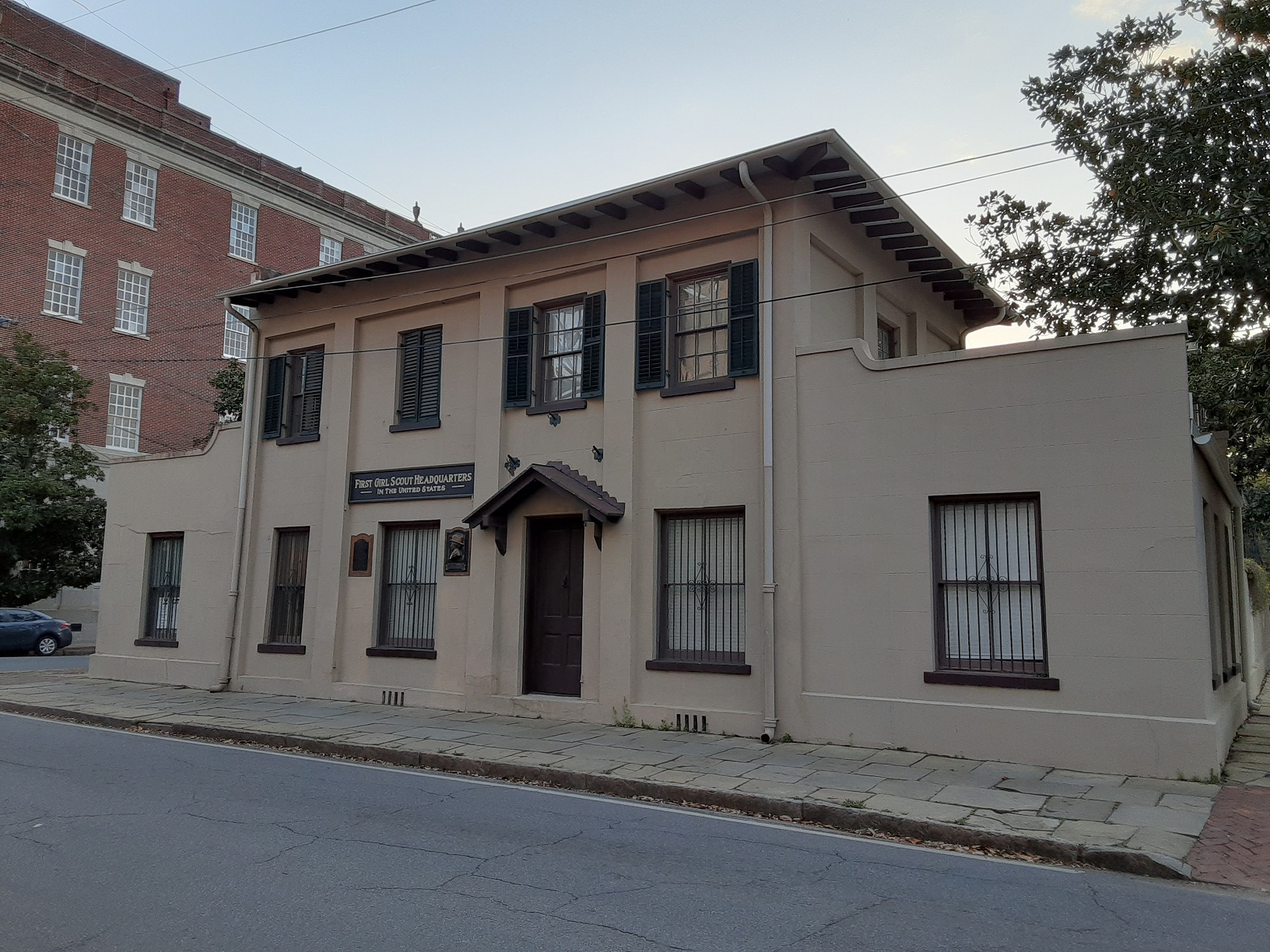
Girl Scout Headquarters

The Wayne-Low House or Birthplace is attributed to the English architect William Jay, who worked in Savannah. The Federal style Birthplace was constructed in 1821 of brick that was covered in stucco that is scored to look like stone. The two-story house with a raised basement has a floorplan that typical of other houses of its era in Savannah; locally, this style is called the "Savannah house". The Birthplace was an expanded version of the Savannah house style with Regency features such as two curved bay windows in the back, plaster cornices and ceiling medallions, marble fireplaces, and shallow recessed elliptical blind arches around the windows of the second story. Both its scored stucco and the arches create illusions that resemble more expensive construction materials and techniques. Its entrance is a one-story portico that projects from the house with brownstone steps on both sides. It has recessed double doors that are framed by modified Tuscan colums. Its main floor includes double parlors, a dining room, a drawing room, and a central hall with curved stairs. The second story has four bedrooms, dressing rooms, and a trunk room.

Low's parents renovated the Birthplace and added a third floor and side portico in 1886. This work was designed by Detlef, Lienau, a New York architect. The new third floor includes five bedrooms and two bathrooms. On the exterior, it had a hipped roof, a bracketed cornice, and windows that featured quoins at their corners. The renovation also added a kitchen to the first floor, adjacent to the new side porch. During the World War II, the Birthplace was divided into apartments. As part of its conversion into apartments, the house's side porch was enclosed, and a kitchen extension was added to the upper floor. The apartments were removed as part of the 1950s renovation.

The Birthplace includes its original stable, privy, and three one-room slave houses. During the 1930s, the stable was converted into a commercial building in the 1930s with the addition of a large window that faced Bull Street.

The Andrew Low House was built in 1847 and is located several blocks from the Birthplace. Its design is attributed to New York architect John Norris. It is a two-story house with a raised basement, built in the Greek Revival style from brick covered with stucco that is scored to resemble stone blocks. The house has an entry portico that is based on the Tower of the Winds in Athens, Greece. It has an entry staircase made of brown sandstone and is flanked by two cast iron lions at the bottom of the stairs. The entrance door is surrounded by pilasters with capitals decorated with acanthus leaves and lotus leaves. It also has a cast iron balcony on its south side that runs along the six windows of the parlor and features guilloche patterns, ornamental railings, and a pagoda-style roof. Smaller cast iron balconies are located on its east side and are supported by cast iron brackets. At its back, the Andrew Low House has a three-story porch, supported by stuccoed posts. Inside, the house has a central hall with a passion flower ceiling medallion, sterling silver doorknobs, and doors surrounded by pediments and pilasters that repeat the exterior's Tower of the Winds motif. The parlors, dining room, and library have fireplace mantles made of black Egyptian marble. The second floor has five bedrooms and an original bathing room which featured running water from a 500 U.S. gallons (1,900 L) tank in the attic that also supplied water to the butler's pantry and kitchen. The tank filled from a rainwater cistern via a hand pump.

The Andrew Low House carriage house and servants quarters is also known as the First Girl Scouts Headquarters. It is believed to have been constructed around 1849. The structure features a two-story central block with one-story wings on either side that connects to the garden walls. It is constructed from bricks covered in stucco with simple plaster pilasters that support a decorative stucco band at the cornice. It has a shallow pyramidal roof with wide eaves with decorative brackets. In 1912, Low remodeled the structure into a meeting place for the Girl Scouts. Changes included closing in the carriage doors that face Drayton Street and converting two doors of the main section into windows. Low also made significant changes to the carriage house's interior, removing or covering most of its original features.

== See also ==
- List of National Historic Landmarks in Georgia (U.S. state)
- National Register of Historic Places listings in Chatham County, Georgia
