= Kinzie =

Kinzie is a surname. Notable people with the surname include:

- George Kinzie Fitzsimons (born 1928), American Catholic prelate
- John H. Kinzie (1803–1865), son of John Kinzie
- John Kinzie (1763–1828), one of Chicago's first permanent European settlers
- John Kinzie Clark (1792–1865), trader and trapper, prominent early settler in the Chicago area
- Juliette Augusta Magill Kinzie (1806–1870), American historian, writer and pioneer of the American midwest
- Mary Kinzie (born 1944), American poet
- Nellie Kinzie Gordon (1835–1917), American writer, granddaughter of John Kinzie
- Walt Kinzie (1858–1909), American baseball player, grandson of John Kinzie

== See also ==
- Kinzie (Northwestern Elevated station), station on the Chicago Transit Authority's Brown Line
- Kinzie Street railroad bridge, single leaf bascule bridge across the Chicago River in downtown Chicago, Illinois
