= Juliette Magill Kinzie =

American historian, novelist, pioneer (1806–1870)

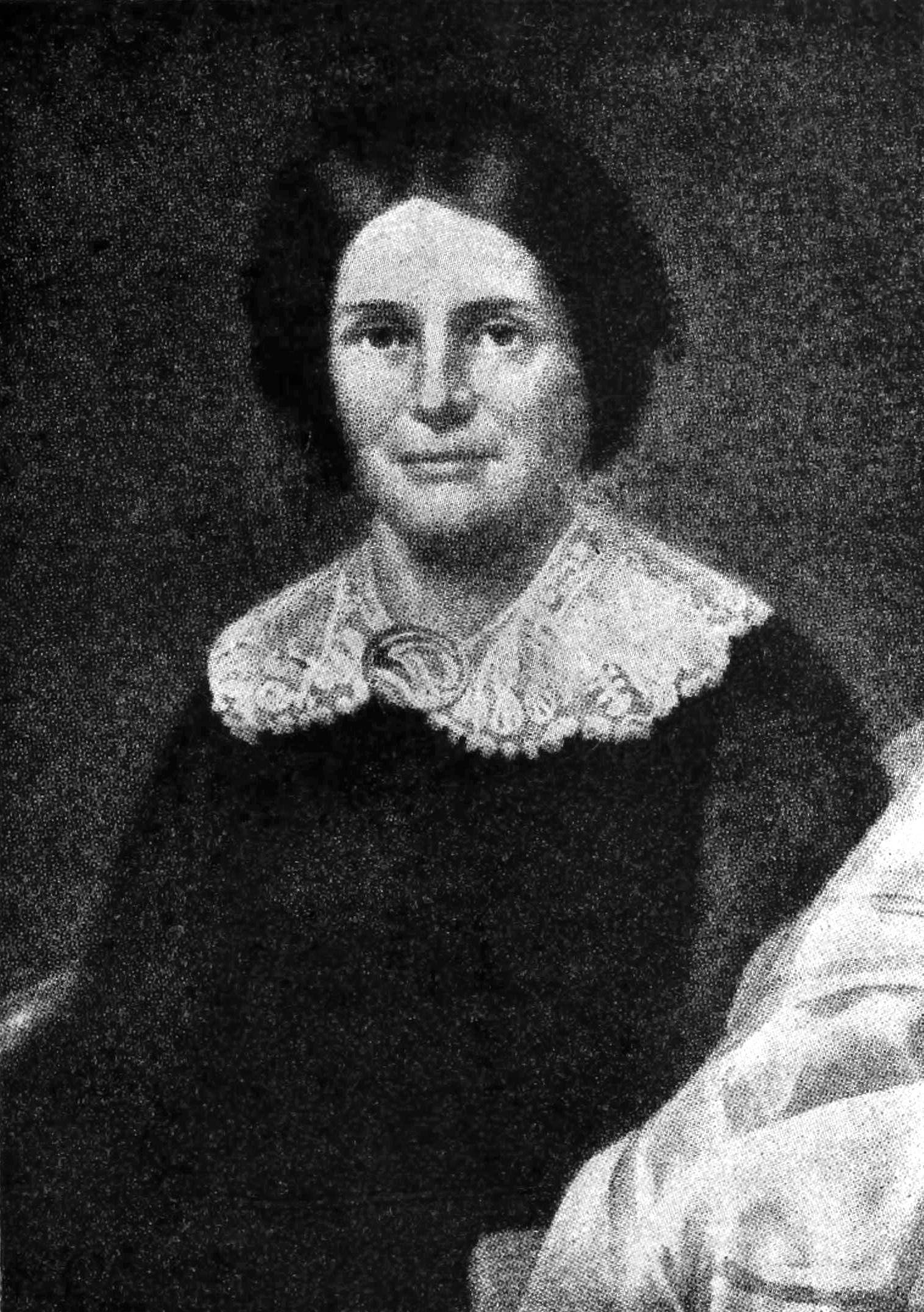
- Born: Juliette Augusta Magill; September 11, 1806; Middletown, Connecticut, U.S.
- Died: September 15, 1870 (aged 64); Amagansett, New York, U.S.
- Spouse: John H. Kinzie
- Children: 7, including Nellie Kinzie Gordon
- Relatives: Walt Kinzie (nephew)

Juliette Augusta Magill Kinzie (September 11, 1806 – September 15, 1870) was an American historian, writer and pioneer of the American Midwest.

== Biography ==
Juliette Magill was born in Middletown, Connecticut, to Frances Wolcott Magill and her second husband, Arthur William Magill. Her mother's ancestors, some of whom helped found Windsor, Connecticut, in 1636, included Roger Wolcott, a colonial governor and judge, and Alexander Wolcott, leader of Connecticut's Republican party. Well educated, Juliette was tutored in Latin and other languages by her mother and young uncle, Alexander Wolcott, and briefly attended a boarding school in New Haven, Connecticut, and Emma Willard's school in Troy, New York.

Wolcott, who had moved to Chicago in 1810, probably introduced Juliette to John H. Kinzie, son of fur trader John Kinzie. They married in 1830 and moved to Detroit and then Fort Winnebago, a new trading post at the crucial portage between the Fox and Wisconsin rivers. Her husband was an Indian sub-agent to the Ho-Chunk nation (Winnebago people), assigned to this area that connected the Great Lakes/St. Lawrence and Mississippi watersheds.

After the treaty ending the Sauk War of 1832 forced the Winnebago to move west of the Mississippi River, the Kinzies left the area that would later become Wisconsin and in July 1833 moved to Chicago in the relatively new state of Illinois to join Kinzie's widowed mother and siblings.

The Kinzie family was involved in Chicago's civic and social development throughout the 19th century. Active in the Episcopal church, Juliette Kinzie helped found St. James Church, now the oldest Episcopal congregation in the city, and since 1955 the cathedral for the Diocese of Chicago. The Kinzies also helped found St. Luke's Hospital and the Chicago Historical Society (now the Chicago History Museum).

Kinzie died while vacationing in Amagansett, New York, Long Island, in 1870, after a druggist accidentally substituted morphine for the quinine she ordered.

== Literary works ==
Members of the Kinzie family, particularly her mother-in-law (Eleanor Lytle Kinzie) and sister-in-law, told Juliette about the Battle of Fort Dearborn at Chicago. Being Canadians, they were not attacked (it was during the War of 1812), and evacuated to Detroit. In 1844 Kinzie published Narrative of the Massacre at Chicago, August 15, 1812, and of Some Preceding Events, anonymously, but acknowledged authorship soon after publication.

Her second book Wau-Bun: The "Early Day" in the North West, extended her first book. It recounted her experiences at Fort Winnebago in the early 1830s, as well as those of her mother-in-law and other relatives during the Black Hawk War. The title reflects the local word for daybreak. Kinzie described her journeys back and forth to the early settlement of Chicago, and complex cultural encounters with a diverse frontier society. Unusual for its day, the book also described sympathetically and in detail the lives of Native Americans, who were being displaced by her extended family and other white settlers. An appendix included excerpts from the journals of relative Thomas Forsyth, who blamed the United States (rather than the Sauk) for starting the war. Published by Derby and Jackson in 1856, it was reprinted 19 times by the end of that century, and four more times in the 20th century. At least one 20th-century historian found it unduly romantic, and criticized it for exaggerating the importance of her relatives, particularly her father-in-law.

In 1869 her novel Walter Ogilby was published. Her Narrative... was reworked and released as Mark Logan, the Bourgeois in 1871 following her death.

== Family and legacy ==
Juliette and John Kinzie had seven children, six of whom survived to adulthood. John Kinzie served as U.S. Army paymaster for Michigan, Wisconsin and Illinois troops in the Civil War and died of a heart attack on his way to a vacation shortly after President Lincoln's assassination. One son died fighting for the Union in the Civil War, two others were taken prisoner by Confederate forces but survived.

Their daughter Eleanor (Nellie) married William Washington Gordon II, son of William Washington Gordon of Savannah, Georgia. In 1860, they named their second child after grandmother Juliette, and Juliette Gordon Low later founded Girl Scouting in America in 1912. Nellie also followed her mother's example by expressing outrage over the treatment of Native American heritage sites and monuments, and caused the National Society of the Colonial Dames of America in the State of Wisconsin to erect a new monument to Tomochichi (who had donated the land on which Savannah began) after the Central of Georgia Railway erected a monument to her father-in-law, displacing a previous Tomochichi monument.

The house in which the Kinzie family lived in what is now Portage, Wisconsin, as discussed in Wau-bun, is now known as the Old Indian Agency House. The National Society of the Colonial Dames of America in the State of Wisconsin, who own the house, restored and refurbished it in 1932 as their centennial project. It has been listed on the National Register of Historic Places since 1972.
