= William Washington Gordon III =

- Born: April 16, 1866; Savannah, Georgia, U.S.
- Died: March 1, 1932 (aged 65); Savannah, Georgia, U.S.
- Burial place: Laurel Grove Cemetery, Savannah, Georgia, U.S.
- Spouse: Ellen Buchan Screven (m. 1892–1932; his death)
- Children: 4
- Relatives: William Washington Gordon II and Eleanor "Nellie" Kinzie Lytle (parents); William Washington Gordon (grandfather)
- Military career
- Allegiance: United States of America
- Rank: Major
- Conflicts: Spanish–American War

William Washington Gordon III (April 16, 1866 – March 1, 1932) was a major in the United States Army during the Spanish–American War. He also served nine years as president of the Georgia Historical Society.

== Early life ==
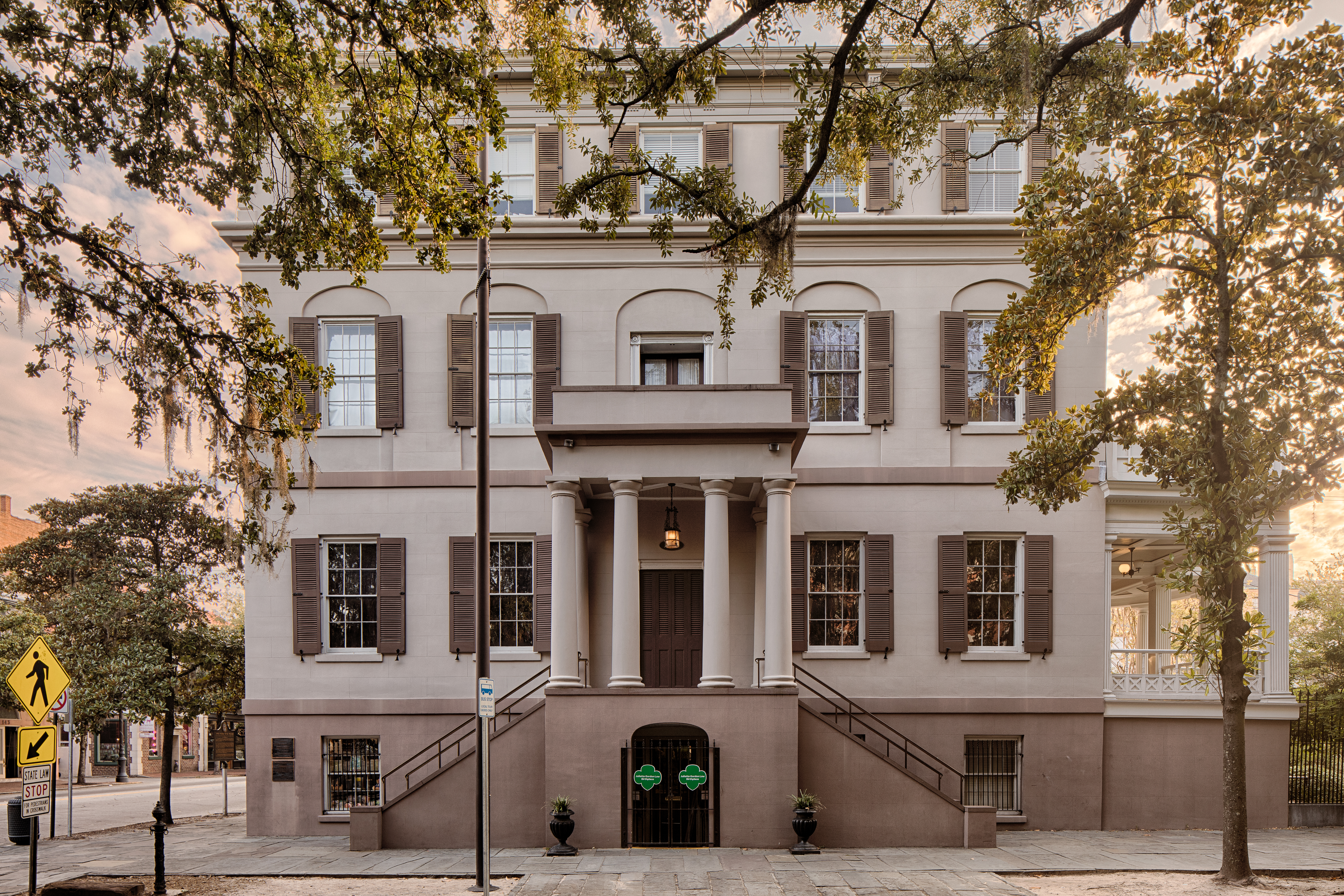
The Gordons' former home, 10 East Oglethorpe Avenue in Savannah, Georgia

Gordon was born in 1866 in Savannah, Georgia, to William Washington Gordon II and Eleanor "Nellie" Kinzie Lytle. He was one of their six children, alongside Juliette Gordon Low, who founded the Girls Scouts of the USA in 1912.

== Career ==
Gordon served a 20-year career as major in the Georgia State Cavalry. He served during the Spanish–American War of 1898.

Between 1922 and 1931, he was president of the Georgia Historical Society.

== Personal life ==
In 1892, Gordon married Ellen Buchan Screven, with whom he had four children: William IV, Ellen, Margaret and Franklin. Franklin died at the age of one.

In 1917, after the death of their mother, Gordon's five remaining siblings inherited an 80-acre (32 ha) tract of land east of Savannah. William bought out the shares of the other four and laid out a subdivision called Gordonston.

== Death ==
Gordon died in 1932, aged 65. He was interred in Savannah's Laurel Grove Cemetery. His widow survived him by fourteen years and was buried beside him upon her death, aged 75.
