= John H. Kinzie =

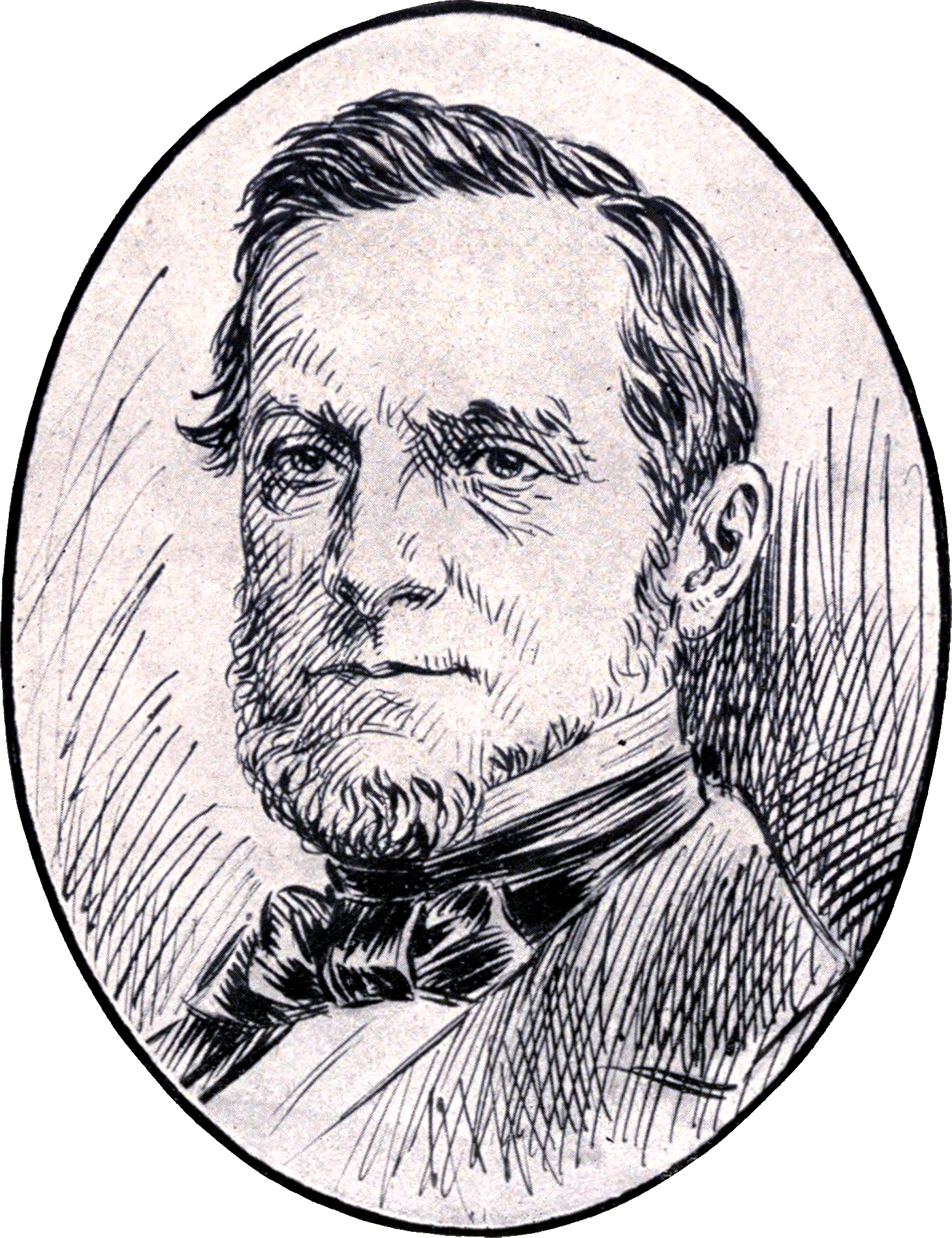

2nd President of the Board of Trustees of the Town of Chicago
- In office August 11, 1834 – May 1837
- Preceded by: Thomas Jefferson Vance Owen
- Succeeded by: William B. Ogden

Member of the Chicago City Council
- In office 1852–1854
- Preceded by: F.C. Hageman
- Succeeded by: Morgan L. Keith
- Constituency: 9th ward
- In office 1839–1840 Serving with Buckner Stith Morris
- Preceded by: George W. Dole
- Succeeded by: R.J. Hamilton
- Constituency: 6th ward

Cook County Sheriff
- In office 1831–1832
- Appointed by: John Reynolds
- Preceded by: Office established
- Succeeded by: Stephen Forbes

Personal details
- Born: John Harris Kinzie; July 7, 1803 Sandwich, Ontario, Upper Canada
- Died: June 19, 1865 (aged 61) near Pittsburgh, PA
- Spouse: Juliette Augusta Magill Kinzie
- Children: 7, including Nellie Kinzie Gordon
- Parent(s): John Kinzie and Eleanor Lytle McKillip Kinzie
- Relatives: Walt Kinzie (nephew)
- Occupation: Trader

John Harris Kinzie (July 7, 1803 – June 19, 1865) was a prominent figure in Chicago politics during the 19th century. He served as the president of the Board of Trustees of Chicago when it was still a town and thrice unsuccessfully ran for Chicago's mayoralty once it was incorporated as a city. He also served as Cook County sheriff. After the Chicago's incorporation as a city, he served as a member of the Chicago Common Council (city council).

== Early life ==
Kinzie was born in Sandwich, Ontario, the eldest son of John Kinzie, one of Chicago's first permanent settlers. His parents were both of Scots-Irish descent having immigrated to Canada in 1763. Kinzie arrived in Chicago with his parents when he was one year old.

The Kinzie family moved to Detroit, Michigan, following the Battle of Fort Dearborn, living there for several years. However, the family returned to Chicago in 1816.

== Life and career ==
From 1818 until 1823, Kinzie worked for the American Fur Company. He spent some time working for the governor of the Michigan Territory in the 1820s and became an Indian subagent at Fort Winnebago until he returned to Chicago in 1833.

In 1831, Kinzie was appointed by governor as the inaugural Cook County Sheriff.

In 1833, Kinzie signed the 1833 Treaty of Chicago as a witness. It became a controversy how much the Kinzie family financially benefited from the terms treaty, given their connection to George Bryan Porter, who had been one of the treaty's government-appointed negotiators.

On August 11, 1834, Kinzie became the second president of the Board of Trustees of the Town of Chicago.

On May 2, 1837, Kinzie ran against William Butler Ogden for mayor when Chicago became a city and lost. He subsequently made two more unsuccessful runs for mayor in 1845 and 1847.

In partnership with George W. Dole, Kinzie built the city's first steamboat.

In 1857 Kinzie was voted president of the Chicago Board of Underwriters.

Kinzie served as U.S. Army paymaster for Michigan, Wisconsin and Illinois troops in the Civil War

== Death and legacy ==
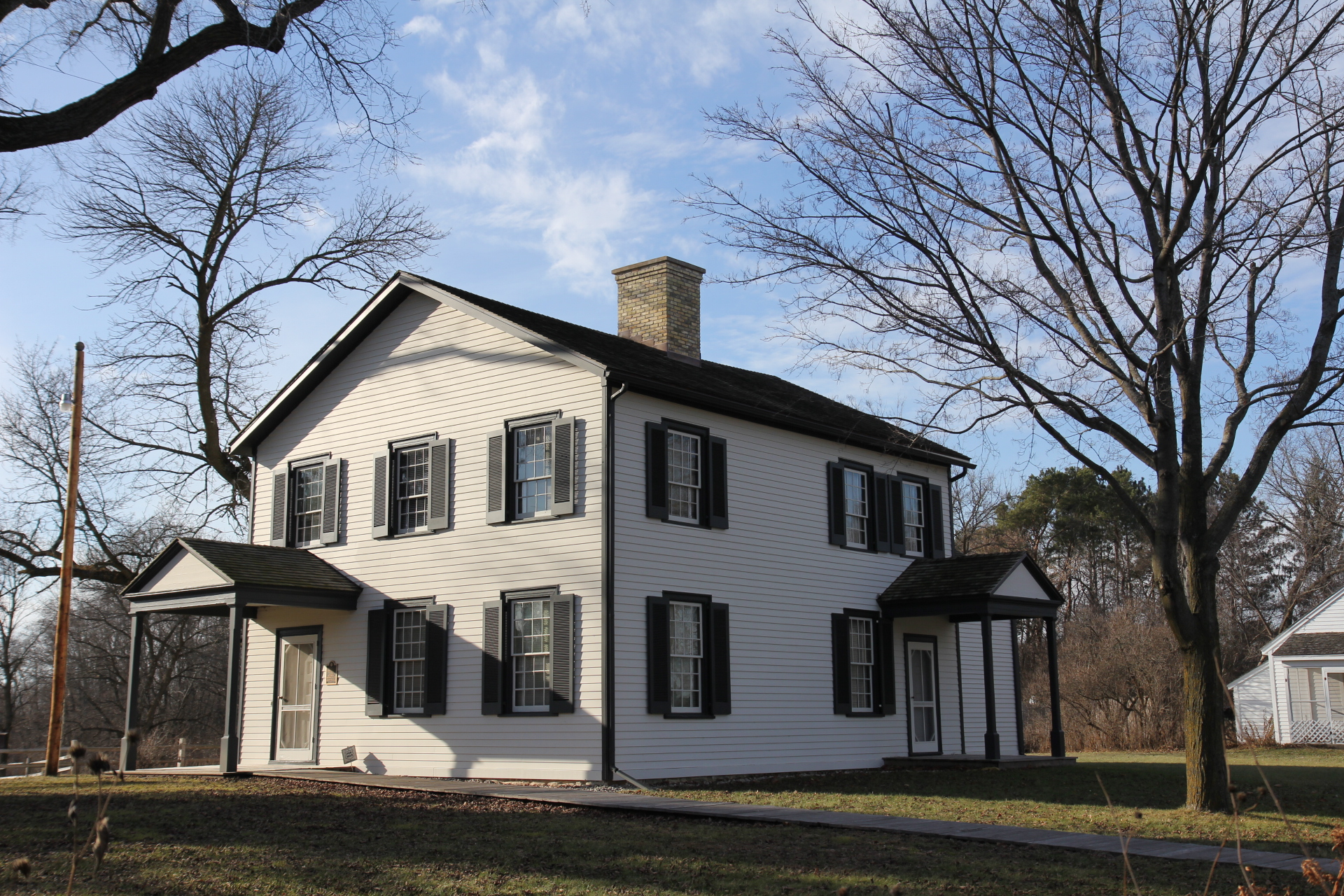
Old Indian Agency House at Portage, Wisconsin

Kinzie died suddenly while on a railroad train on June 21, 1865. A blind fiddler had come into their car asking for alms. Kinzie, having reached into his pocket to retrieve his wallet, fell forward and hit his head.

At the time of his death, Kinzie was deeply in debt. Writing May 23 1861 to Hercules L. Dousman of Prairie du Chien, who had loaned him money for decades, Kinzie said "since the hard times commenced [1858 Panic] business has decreased so that it is literally almost nothing, not sufficient to meet my ordinary and family expense, I have not this far been successful in obtaining any office. All I have to offer to my creditors until times change, is the security on property which they hold and which covers all that I own except an undivided 30 acres adjoining the Town of Lasalle at the terminus of our Canal, which I am willing to mortgage to you if you desire it." Despite his finding a government job under Lincoln, he apparently did not climb out of debt and after his death, his wife wrote Dousman in an attempt to deal with debts to him. Dousman also suddenly died in 1868 leaving his financial records and myriad business connections to his wife and son Louis to figure out; resolution is not clear from the correspondence as of fall 1868. The Dousman papers reflect Kinzie's speculations and debts over time and his unwillingness to complete a loan as long as the loaner was willing to extend the loan. Modern researchers will be aghast by Kinzie's presumption and his seeming addiction to speculating on Chicago properties, which he enthusiastically described.

John H. Kinzie Elementary School in Chicago, Illinois, is named after him.

The house he and his wife resided in for a short period at the end of his time as an Indian sub-agent, now known as the Old Indian Agency House, in Portage, Wisconsin, has been listed on the National Register of Historic Places.

== Family ==
Kinzie's father was John Kinzie and his mother was Eleanor Lytle McKillip Kinzie.

Kinzie himself was married to historian and author Juliette Augusta Magill Kinzie. Together they had seven children. Three of their children died in either their infancy or youth, these being Alexander Wolcott (1833–1839), Julian Magill (born 1843, died at age six weeks), and Francis William (1844–1850, died of cholera). Four of their children survived into adulthood, these being Eleanor "Nellie" Lytle (1835–1917), John Harris Jr. (1838–1862), Capt. Arthur Magill (1841–1902), and George Herbert (1846–1890). Nellie married William Washington Gordon II (the son of politician William Washington Gordon), with whom she had six children (including Juliette Gordon Low, founder of the Girl Scouts of the USA).

One of Kinzie's sons died fighting for the Union in the Civil War, two others were taken prisoner by Confederate forces but survived. His son-in-law William Washington Gordon II was an officer in the Confederate Army, fighting first under J.E.B. Stuart's cavalry before becoming a captain in Mercer's Brigade and eventually falling wounded during the Battle of Lovejoy's Station.
