= La Lime =

La Lime is a surname. Notable people with the surname include:

- Helen La Lime (born 1951), American diplomat
- Jean La Lime (died 1812), trader from Quebec and was called the "first murder in Chicago"
