= Jean La Lime =

American trader and murder victim

Jean La Lime or Lalime (died June 17, 1812) was a trader from Quebec, Canada who worked in what became the Northwest Territory of the United States. He worked as an agent for William Burnett, also of Canada, to sell to the Native Americans and take furs in exchange. He was among the first European permanent settlers in Chicago. He was killed there in 1812, in what was called the "first murder in Chicago", by John Kinzie, a trading partner of Burnett who was another early settler from Canada.

== Chicago ==
During the time of the American Revolutionary War, France joined the cause of the Americans against the British. Because of this, in their Canadian territories, the British treated those of French heritage more harshly. Several families, the first two being the families of Jean La Lime and Antoinne Ouillemette, fled to the Eschikagou (Chicago) area to escape the harsh treatment. After trading along the frontier and likely in Detroit, La Lime arrived in the Chicago area on August 17, 1792 as an agent for William Burnett of Canada. In 1800, he purchased the homestead of Jean Baptiste Point du Sable for Burnett for 6,000 livres. The bill of sale was filed in Detroit, Michigan on September 18, 1800, although dated in Chicago on May 7 of that year. After the Americans established Fort Dearborn in 1804, La Lime worked there as an interpreter, aiding communication between the Americans and Indians. He broke his leg in 1809 and, as it was improperly set, was left lame.

== Murder ==
By 1804, Burnett's partner, John Kinzie, who also settled in Chicago, had bought the former du Sable house. He lived there with his wife and first child. They had three other children born in Chicago. On June 17, 1812 in Chicago, La Lime and Kinzie quarreled, and Kinzie killed him. Kinzie fled to Milwaukee, then in Indian territory. He claimed La Lime had shot at him and he had stabbed the interpreter in self-defense.

In letters to U.S. Secretary of War William Eustis, fort Factor Matthew Irwin and Surgeon's Mate Isaac Van Voorhis wrote that Kinzie murdered La Lime in an argument over Irwin informing the War Department about Kinzie corruptly obtaining the fort sutler's contract.

== Burial ==
La Lime was originally buried within sight of Kinzie's house, as the European settlement was thinly strung along Lake Michigan.

Recounting stories told her by John Kinzie’s wife Eleanor Lytle Kinzie, John Kinzie’s daughter-in-law Juliette Magill Kinzie later wrote that La Lime’s friends buried him directly in front of John Kinzie’s home as “suitable punishment,” but that the Kinzie family maintained the gravesite “in most beautiful order” and planted flowers on it.

However, former Kinzie family servant Victoire Porthier, who grew up in the Kinzie house, told historian A.T. Andreas in 1883, “I don’t think his grave was very near Mr. Kinzie’s house. I don’t remember that Mr. Kinzie ever took care of the grave.”

In 1891, a coffin was discovered at Wabash Avenue and Illinois Street near the Rush Street Bridge. Based on the research of Joseph Kirkland, the bones inside were believed to be La Lime's. The remains are held by the Chicago History Museum.
