= Nellie Kinzie Gordon =

American writer (1835–1917)

- Gordon around 1892
- Born: Eleanor Lytle Kinzie; June 18, 1835; Fort Dearborn, Illinois, U.S.
- Died: February 22, 1917 (aged 81); Amagansett, New York, U.S.
- Burial place: Laurel Grove Cemetery, Savannah, Georgia, U.S.
- Occupation: Author
- Spouse: William Washington Gordon II (m. 1857–1912; his death)
- Children: 6, including Juliette Gordon Low and William Washington Gordon III
- Parent(s): John Harris Kinzie and Juliette Augusta Magill

Nellie Kinzie Gordon (born Eleanor Lytle Kinzie; June 18, 1835 – February 22, 1917) was an American writer. She wrote a book about her grandfather, titled John Kinzie, the Father of Chicago: A Sketch, but was mostly known for her humanitarian work during the1876 yellow fever epidemic and the Spanish–American War of 1898.

Her husband was politician William Washington Gordon II; their daughter, Juliette Gordon Low, founded the Girls Scouts of the USA; and their son, William Washington Gordon III, was a major in the United States Army.

== Early life ==
Eleanor Lytle Kinzie was born in 1835 at Fort Dearborn, Illinois, to Major John Harris Kinzie and Juliette Augusta Magill. She was one of their seven children, the others being Julian (who died at six weeks), Frank (who died, aged six, from cholera), Alexander (who also died aged six, having drunk a bottle of corrosive sublimate), John Jr., Arthur and George. Her paternal grandparents were John Kinzie, a noted fur trader, and Eleanor Lytle McKillip Kinzie.

She grew up in a home on Chicago's North Side, at the corner of Cass Street and Michigan Street, past which the city's first board sidewalk was built. She attended the school of a Mrs. Elmore at the corner of Michigan Avenue and Lake Street, crossing the Chicago River at Rush Street on a scow. She later studied at Madame Canda's School in New York City, where she became an expert pianist. She also learned art and became fluent in speaking French and Italian.

== Career ==
During the 1876 yellow fever epidemic which struck Savannah, Georgia, her husband remained in the city to nurse the sick while Gordon went to Guyton, 30 miles (48 km) northwest of Savannah, where many people had fallen ill, including Colonel Edward Clifford Anderson Jr. He died there in late September.

William was appointed brigadier-general of the United States Army in May 1898. Shortly thereafter, during the Spanish–American War, Gordon accompanied her husband to Camp Miami, a training center in Miami, Florida. There, she assessed the camp's location as having no depth in the soil, tents blowing down in high wind and the water being full of lime, which "disagrees with the men and gives them dysentry." She noted in her diary that the drinking water was not from the water tower but from the railroad tank, "which got its water from two 24 feet wells, located between two brigades, and into which surface drainage flowed from both brigades." Gordon organized a convalescent tent and operated a makeshift hospital. A more permanent facility was set up near the Royal Palm Hotel.

In 1907, Gordon wrote Rosemary and Rue, a collection of verses in memory of her daughter, Sara. She followed this, in 1910, with a book about her grandfather, titled John Kinzie, the Father of Chicago: A Sketch. Five years later, she edited a book written by her mother, titled Wau-Bun.

On March 3, 1916, Gordon received the following letter from an anonymous resident of Savannah:

Dear Madam:
I know that you will be greatly surprised when you have read this letter. On March 3, 1884, you did a great good in your charity work. There was a family living in Savannah. They did not have any money. The mother had to do washing to support her 18 months old baby, and through your help they were kept from starving. The father died March 4, 1884, and was buried the next day. The city was going to bury him, but you, with your noble heart, did not let the city bury him. You arranged matters so that his funeral was a decent and respectable one. It has just been today 32 years, and I know that you have forgotten all about it, but there is still one living that will never forget your kindness. The writer of this letter is that 18 months old baby, who wants to thank you for your kindness. If there is any way that I can show my gratitude to you, it will be a pleasure to serve you.

Late in her life, Gordon found a narrative of Lieutenant Linai Taliaferro Helm's order regarding the Battle of Fort Dearborn, which had been lost for nearly a century. She published it under the title The Fort Dearborn Massacre, by Lieutenant Helm.

== Personal life ==
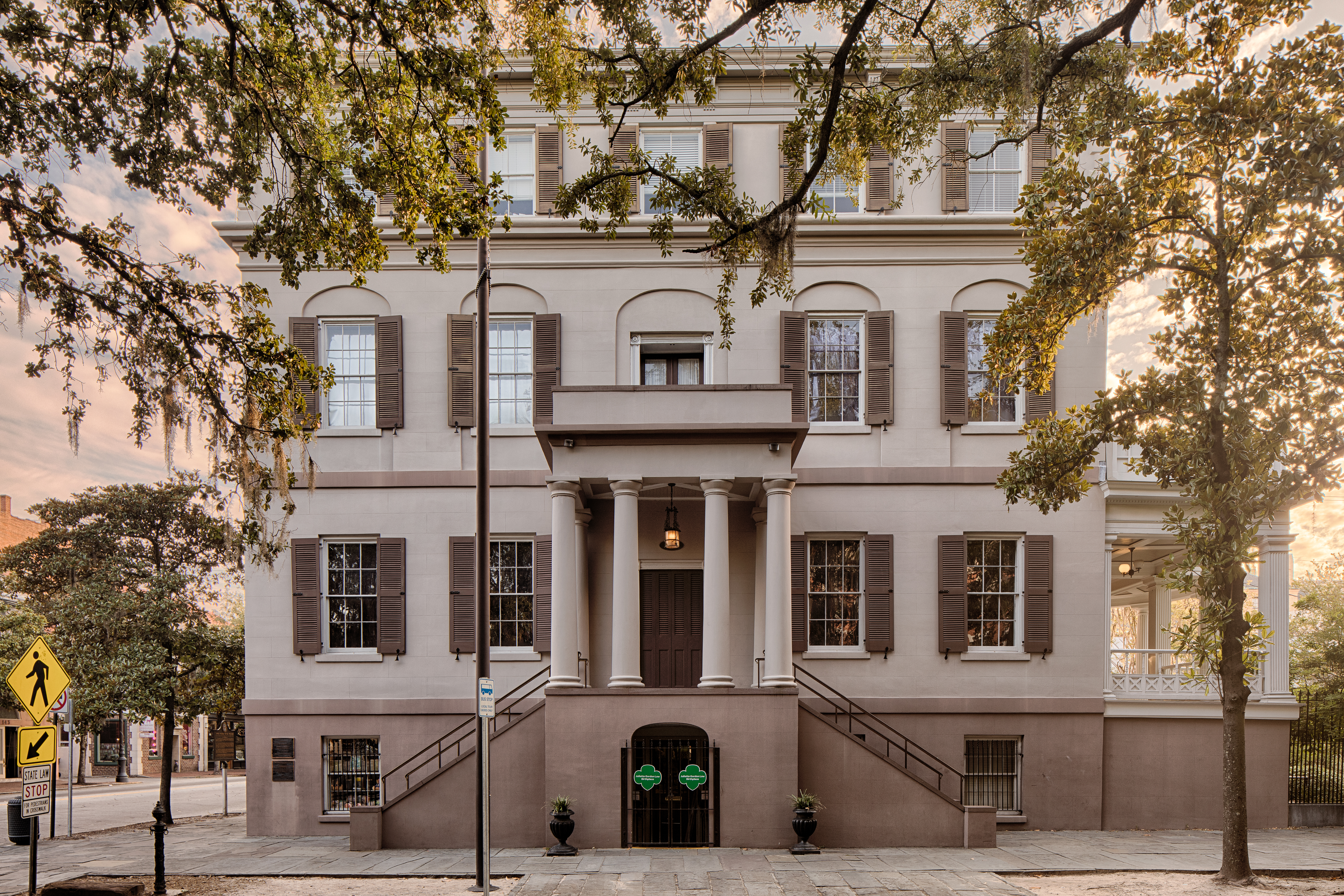
The Gordons' former home, 10 East Oglethorpe Avenue in Savannah, Georgia

After completing her education, Gordon had her portrait painted by George Peter Alexander Healy. It hung in the family's home in Savannah, at 10 East Oglethorpe Avenue (today known as the birthplace of Juliette Gordon Low, one of Gordon's daughters, who founded the Girl Scouts of the USA in 1912). The family spent summers at Etowah Cliffs, an estate in northern Georgia, which was formerly the home of William H. Stiles. It burned down in 1971.

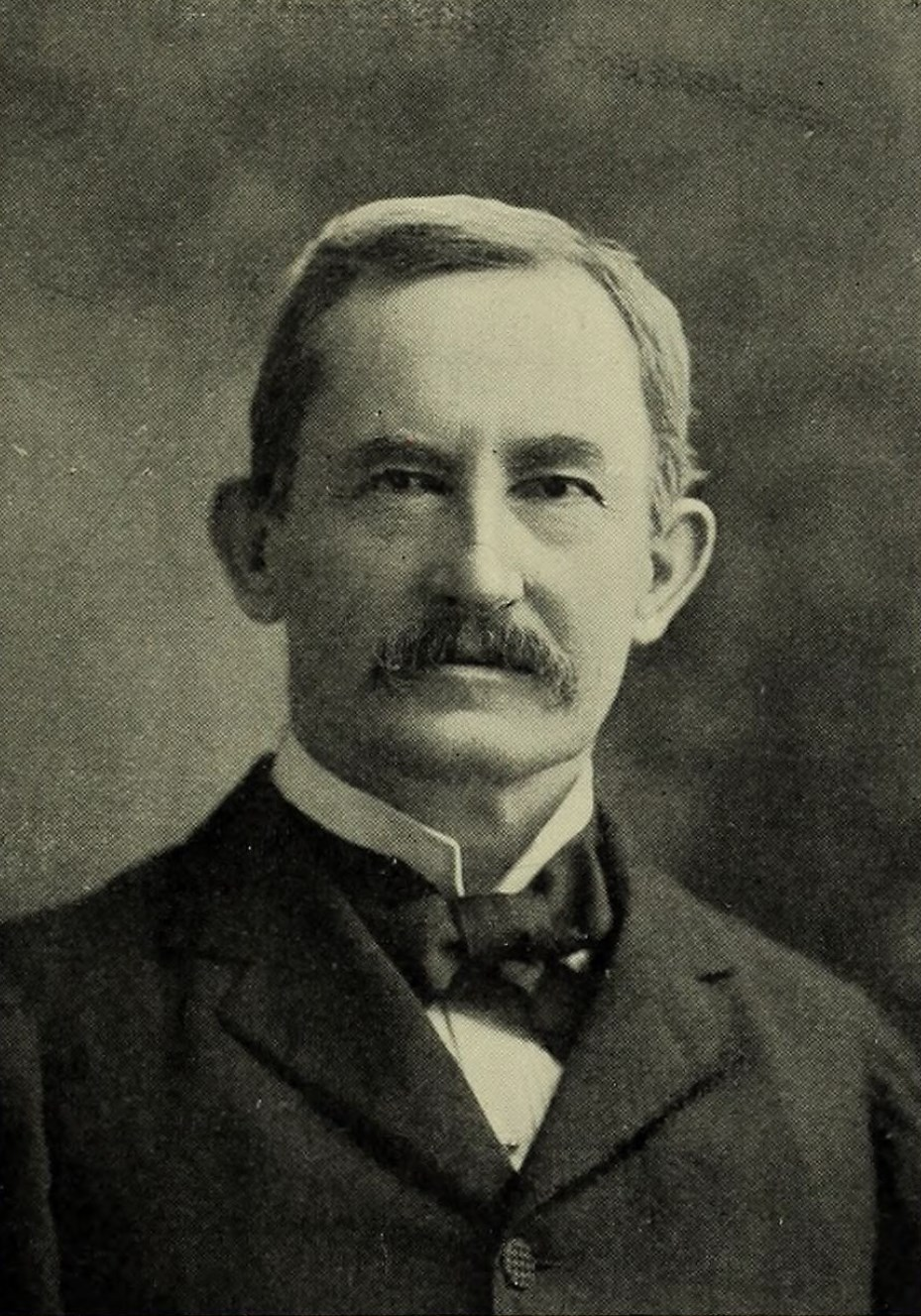
Gordon's husband, William Washington Gordon II, around 1900

In 1857, Kinzie married William Washington Gordon II, son of politician William Washington Gordon, at Chicago's St. James Church, of which her mother was a founder. They met at Yale University Library in 1853, when William was a senior and Nellie slid down a library banister toward him. (Another source says they met at the residence of Joseph Earl Sheffield, and that Gordon was in the drawing room when she slid down a banister.) Gordon moved to Savannah, where she lived for the rest of her life. The couple had six children: Eleanor Kinzie Parker, Juliette Gordon Low, Sara Alice Gordon, William Washington III, Mabel McLane Leigh and George Arthur Gordon. Eleanor married politician Richard W. Parker. Sara died, aged 17, while at school in New York.

In 1883, to prepare for the construction of a monument to Gordon's father-in-law in Savannah's Wright Square, the body of Creek chieftan Tomochichi was relocated from the center of the square to its southeastern corner. Gordon later advocated for a new monument to be erected in honor of Tomochichi. It was completed in 1899.

In 1916, Gordon wrote a letter to the Chicago Daily News, stating that her name was omitted in their September 7 list of the oldest and earliest citizens of Chicago:

I notice that my name is conspicuously absent. This is more surprising, as I am the oldest person now living who was born in Chicago—on June 18, 1835. I am, therefore, older than Chicago itself, which was not incorporated as a city until several years after my birth.

— Nellie Kenzie Gordon, Chicago Daily News, October 27, 1916

Gordon was first president of the Georgia branch of the National Society of the Colonial Dames of America. She remained in the role for six years and declined reelection.

== Death ==
Gordon died in 1917, aged 81, while in Amgansett, New York, likely at the home of her widowed mother, who died in 1870. She was interred in Laurel Grove Cemetery in Savannah. She had survived her husband for five years, and was buried beside him.

=== Legacy ===
Her wax figurine was added to the Chicago Historical Society's original collection of the city's notable women. She had gifted the society the Genealogy of John McKenzie in 1909.

== Publications ==
- Rosemary and Rue (1907)
- John Kinzie, the Father of Chicago: A Sketch (1910)
