= 10 East Oglethorpe Avenue =

Historic house in Savannah, Georgia

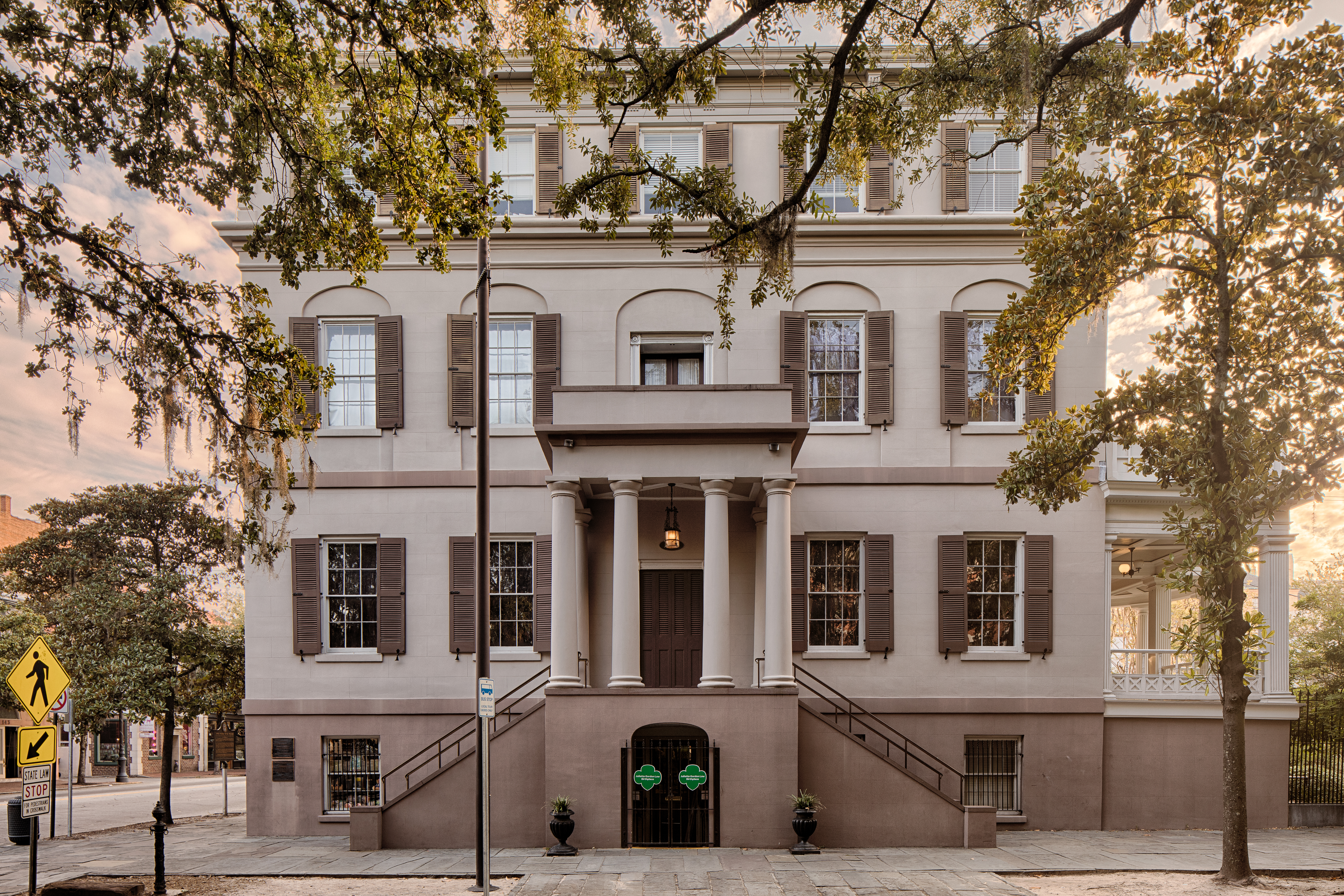
- Pictured in 2019
- Interactive map of the 10 East Oglethorpe Avenue area
- Alternative names: Wayne–Gordon House

General information
- Location: Savannah, Georgia, U.S., 10 East Oglethorpe Avenue
- Coordinates: 32.0771°N 81.0924°W
- Completed: 1820 (206 years ago)

Technical details
- Floor count: 3

10 East Oglethorpe Avenue (also known as the Juliette Gordon Low Birthplace and the Wayne–Gordon House) is a home in Savannah, Georgia, United States. Located on East Oglethorpe Avenue, it was built in 1820 and is part of the Savannah Historic District and of the Juliette Gordon Low Historic District. Juliette Gordon Low, the founder of the Girl Scouts of the USA, was born in the home in 1860. The house was Savannah's first registered National Historic Landmark.

== History ==
The home was built for James Moore Wayne, then-mayor of Savannah. In 1831, Wayne sold the house to his niece, Sarah Stites Gordon, and her husband William Washington Gordon, Low's paternal grandparents and the first of four generations of Gordons to live in the house.

Low's parents, Eleanor Kinzie and William Washington Gordon II, purchased the house after the death of her grandparents and made significant changes to the house in 1886, including adding a third storey. Low lived there until she married William Mackay Low in 1886 and moved to the United Kingdom in 1887, although she visited her parents in Savannah every year.

The Girl Scouts of the USA purchased the Wayne–Gordon House from the Low family in 1953 and began an extensive renovation of the dilapidated building. In 1956, Savannah landscape architect Clermont Huger Lee created a courtyard and garden design for the site in the style of a Victorian parterre garden. Opened in 1956 as a historic house museum, the home features many original Gordon family furnishings, including art by Low. The museum interprets Low's life and the history of the Girl Scouts.

== See also ==
- Buildings in Savannah Historic District
