= Fort Winnebago =

19th Century U.S. Army Fortification

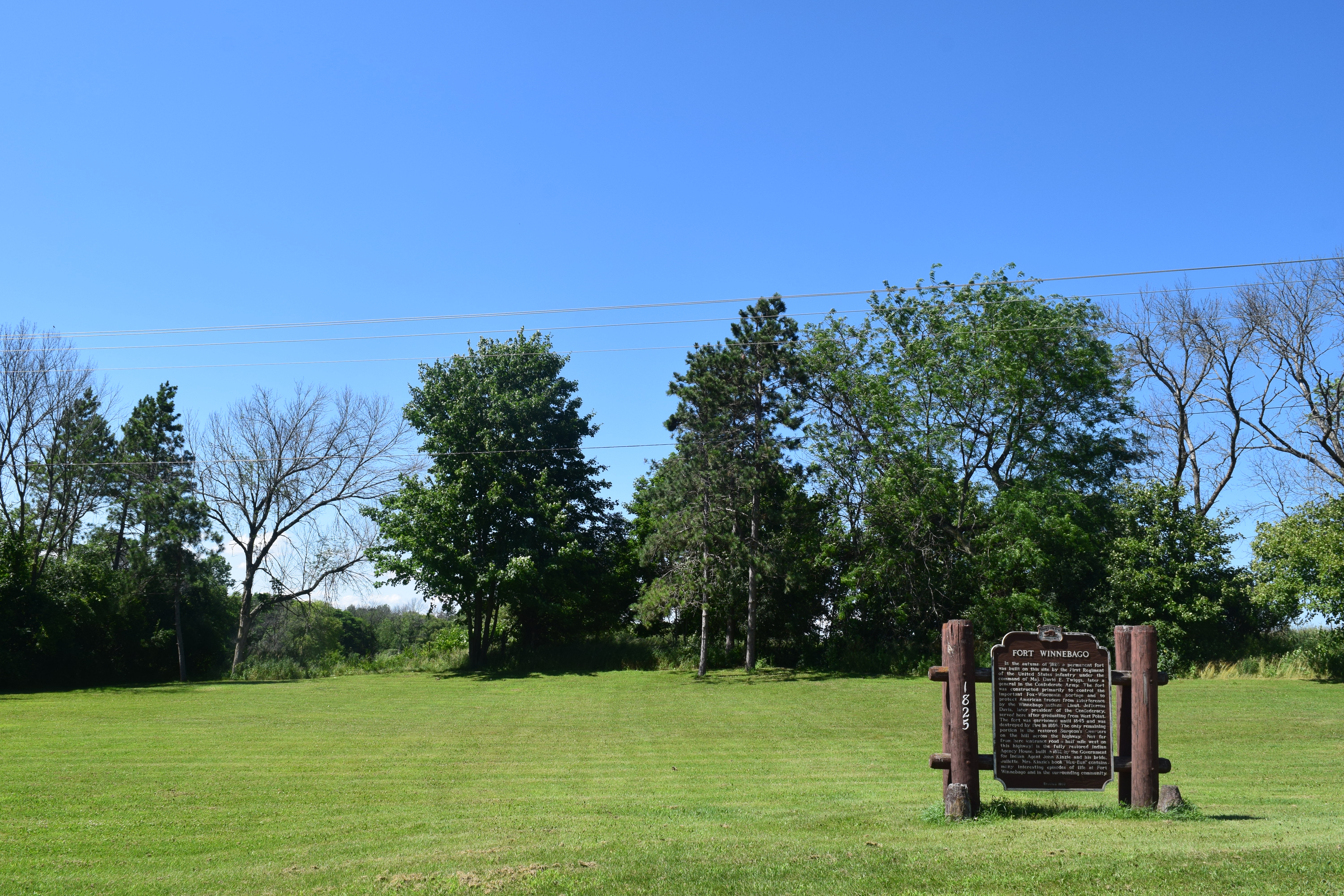
Historical marker at the site of Fort Winnebago

Fort Winnebago was a 19th-century fortification of the United States Army located on a hill overlooking the eastern end of the portage between the Fox and Wisconsin Rivers east of present-day Portage, Wisconsin. It was the middle one of three fortifications along the Fox-Wisconsin Waterway that also included Fort Howard in Green Bay, Wisconsin and Fort Crawford in Prairie du Chien, Wisconsin. Fort Winnebago was constructed in 1828 as part of an effort to maintain peace between white settlers and the region's Native American tribes following the Winnebago War of 1827. The fort's location was chosen not only because of its proximity to the site of Red Bird's surrender in the Winnebago War, but also because of the strategic importance of the portage on the Fox-Wisconsin Waterway, a heavily traveled connection between the Great Lakes and the Mississippi River. Fort Winnebago's location near the portage allowed it to regulate transportation between the lakes and the Mississippi.

With the exception of the participation of troops from the fort in the 1832 Black Hawk War, Fort Winnebago was not involved in any combat operations during its occupation by the U.S. Army. Instead, the garrison, which from 1829 to 1831 included Lt. Jefferson Davis (later President of the Confederate States of America), was put to work in building a military road between Portage and Fond du Lac, Wisconsin, and assisting with the relocation of the Ho-Chunk Nation from Wisconsin to Minnesota during the 1840s. In 1845, the absence of any real threat to peace in the region prompted the abandonment of the fort. Nine years later the site was sold into private hands, and in 1856 a fire destroyed much of the fort.

== History ==
"The Portage" was a land bridge just 1 1/4 miles wide separating waterways that flow into the Atlantic Ocean to the east and the Gulf of Mexico to the south. The Fox River flows north toward Green Bay, providing access to the Great Lakes, the St. Lawrence River, and the Atlantic Ocean. The Wisconsin River flows southwest to the Mississippi River, which empties into the Gulf of Mexico. The area around Portage was an early travel route for Native Americans. Centuries before Europeans arrived, they traversed the 2700-pace footpath between the rivers and recognized it as an important travel route.

In the early 1800s, the U.S. government recognized the geographical importance of "le Portage", which became known as "Portage". Fort Winnebago was one of three forts built to subjugate the Native Americans and to protect Euro-American commerce along the Fox-Wisconsin water system in the territory that later became the state of Wisconsin. The other two were Fort Howard in Green Bay and Fort Crawford, in Prairie du Chien.

"By Command of Maj.-Gen. Macomb"

"R. Jones, Adjt.-Gen."

"here was necessity for some means of protection to the fur trade from Winnebago (Ho-Chunk) exactions; ... the general government at the solicitation of John Jacob Astor, who was then at the head of the American Fur Company, and upon whose goods the Indians levied tariffs and tolls, authorized the erection of a post at portage."

== Fort Winnebago Surgeons Quarters ==
- Fort Winnebago Surgeons Quarters
- U.S. National Register of Historic Places
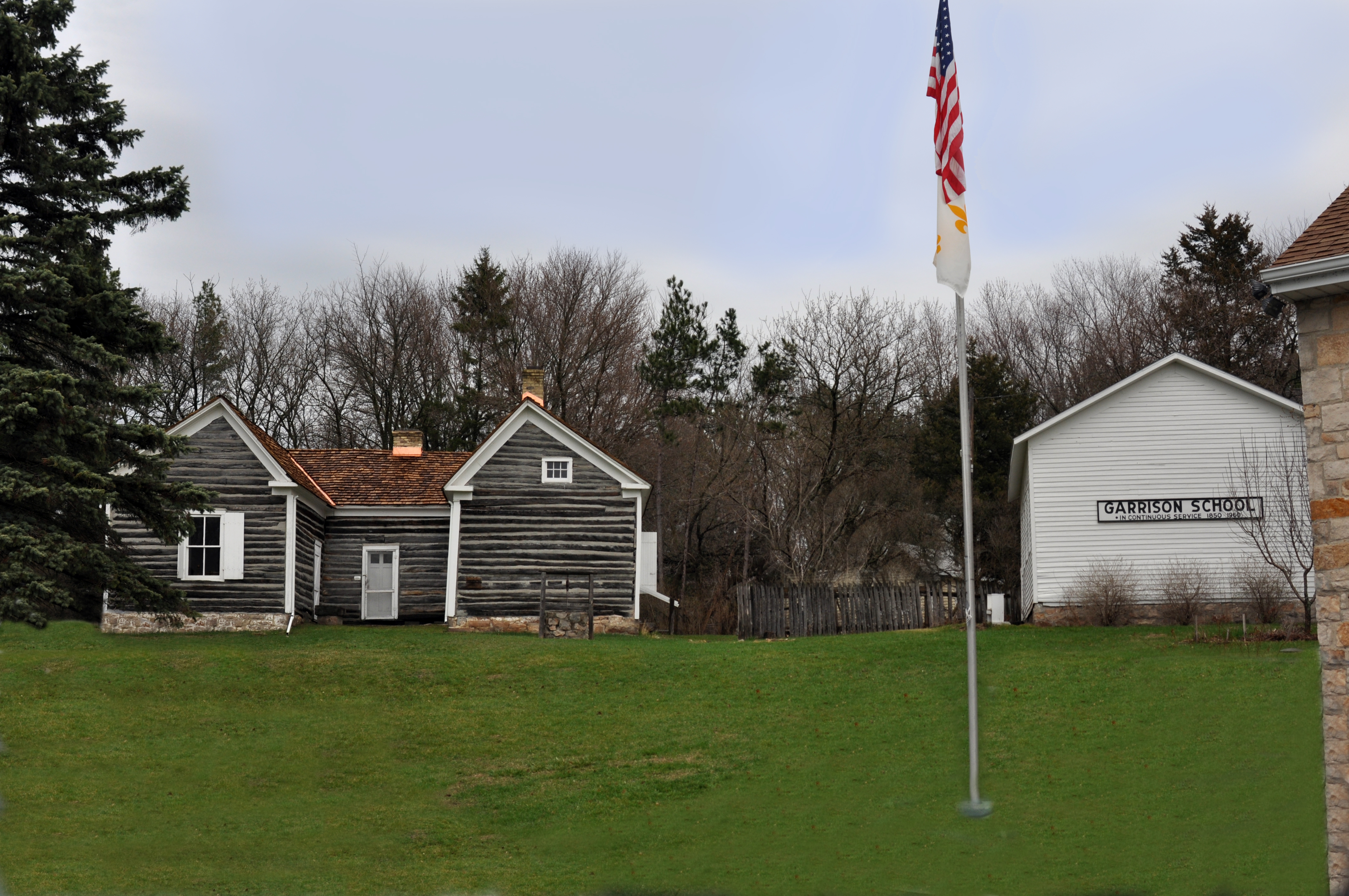
- Fort Winnebago Surgeons Quarters Historic Site

- Location within Wisconsin Location within the United States
- Nearest city: Portage, Wisconsin
- Coordinates: 43°33′16″N 89°25′58″W
- Area: 3 acres (1.2 ha)
- Built: circa 1820-1824
- Built by: Francis Le Roi
- Architectural style: French colonial log home
- NRHP reference No.: 70000029
- Added to NRHP: October 28, 1970

Today, all that remain intact are the fort's surgeon's and officers' quarters. This structure now operates as the Fort Winnebago Surgeon's Quarters, a historic house museum operated by the Wisconsin Society Daughters of the American Revolution, and is listed on the National Register of Historic Places. The surgeon's quarters, built circa 1824 at the portage by Francois LeRoi and used as a sutler store, then sold to the US Army as a home for the Fort's surgeon. The building now known as "the Surgeons Quarters" was built in 1824 by Francois Le Roi and Therese L'Ecuyer, a Métis. In it, they operated a fur trading and sutler's post and a portaging business. It is one of the oldest French colonial log homes in Wisconsin still standing on its original foundation and is the only remaining building of the historic Fort Winnebago, which was active from 1828 through 1845.

Garrison School was built circa 1850 near the former Fort property. Both properties are owned, operated, and maintained by the Wisconsin Society Daughters of the American Revolution, which operates it as a historic house museum with 19th century period furnishings and fort artifacts. Garrison School, a 19th-century one room schoolhouse that was in use until 1960, was moved from its former location on Garrison Road to its current site next to the surgeon's quarters.

=== Notable residents ===
- John Joseph Abercrombie Lt.
- Jefferson Davis – Lt. 1829-1831
- William S. Harney Cap., Col., Gen.
- John H. Kinzie and Juliette Augusta Magill Kinzie, Indian Sub-Agent
- Randolph B. Marcy – Bvt. Second Lieut., 5th Infantry, 1832-1835
- Edwin Vose Sumner
- David E. Twiggs - Maj.
- Charlotte Ouisconsin Clark Van Cleve
- Horatio P. Van Cleve – Bvt. Second Lieut., 5th Infantry, 1831-1835, 1835-1836

== Indian Agency House ==
- Historic Indian Agency House
- U.S. National Register of Historic Places
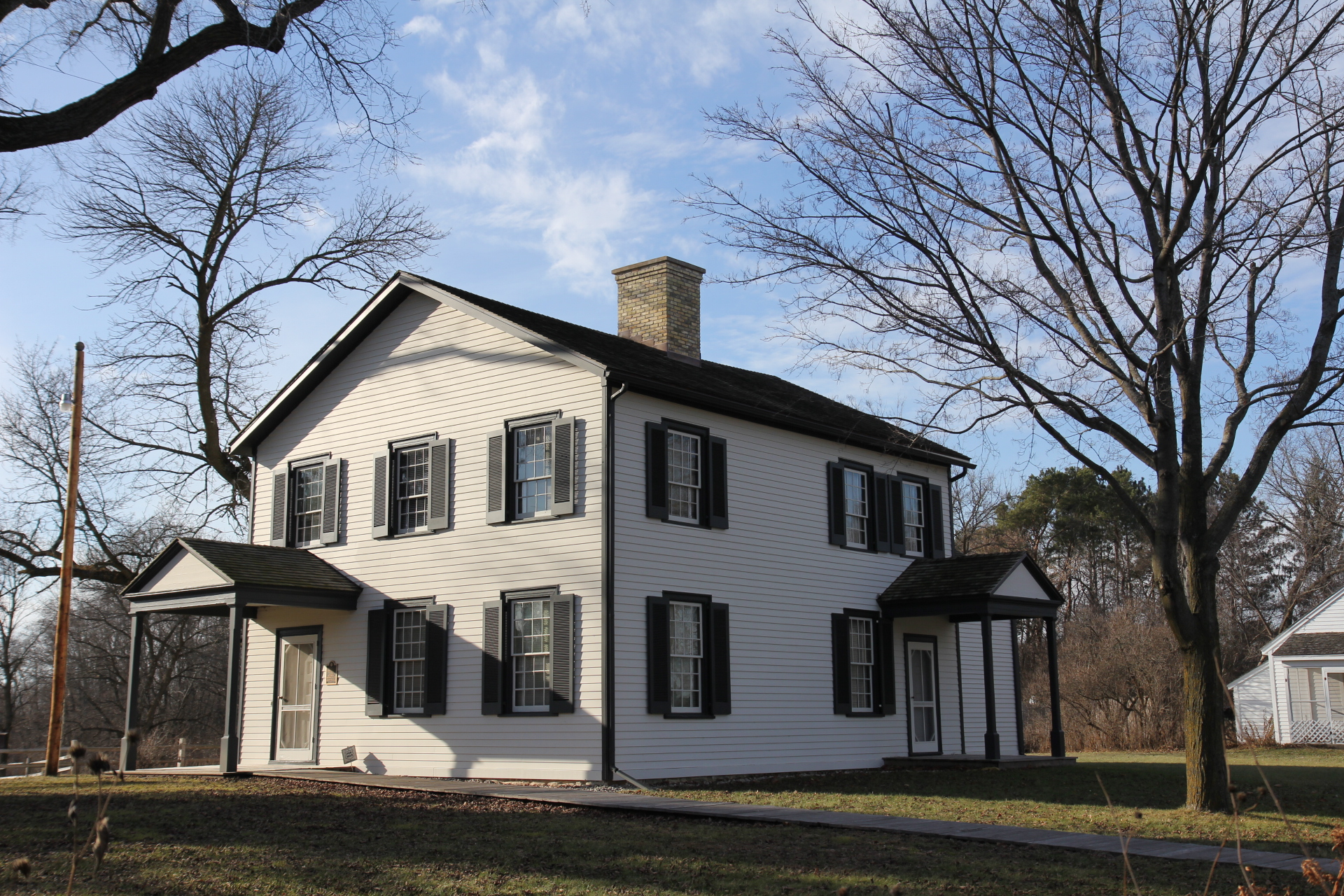
- Historic Indian Agency House in December 2014
- Location: NE end of old Agency House Rd. (Rte.1) near NE city limits, Portage, Wisconsin
- Area: 1.4 acres (0.57 ha)
- Built: 1832
- Architectural style: Federal, New England Colonial
- NRHP reference No.: 72000045
- Added to NRHP: February 1, 1972

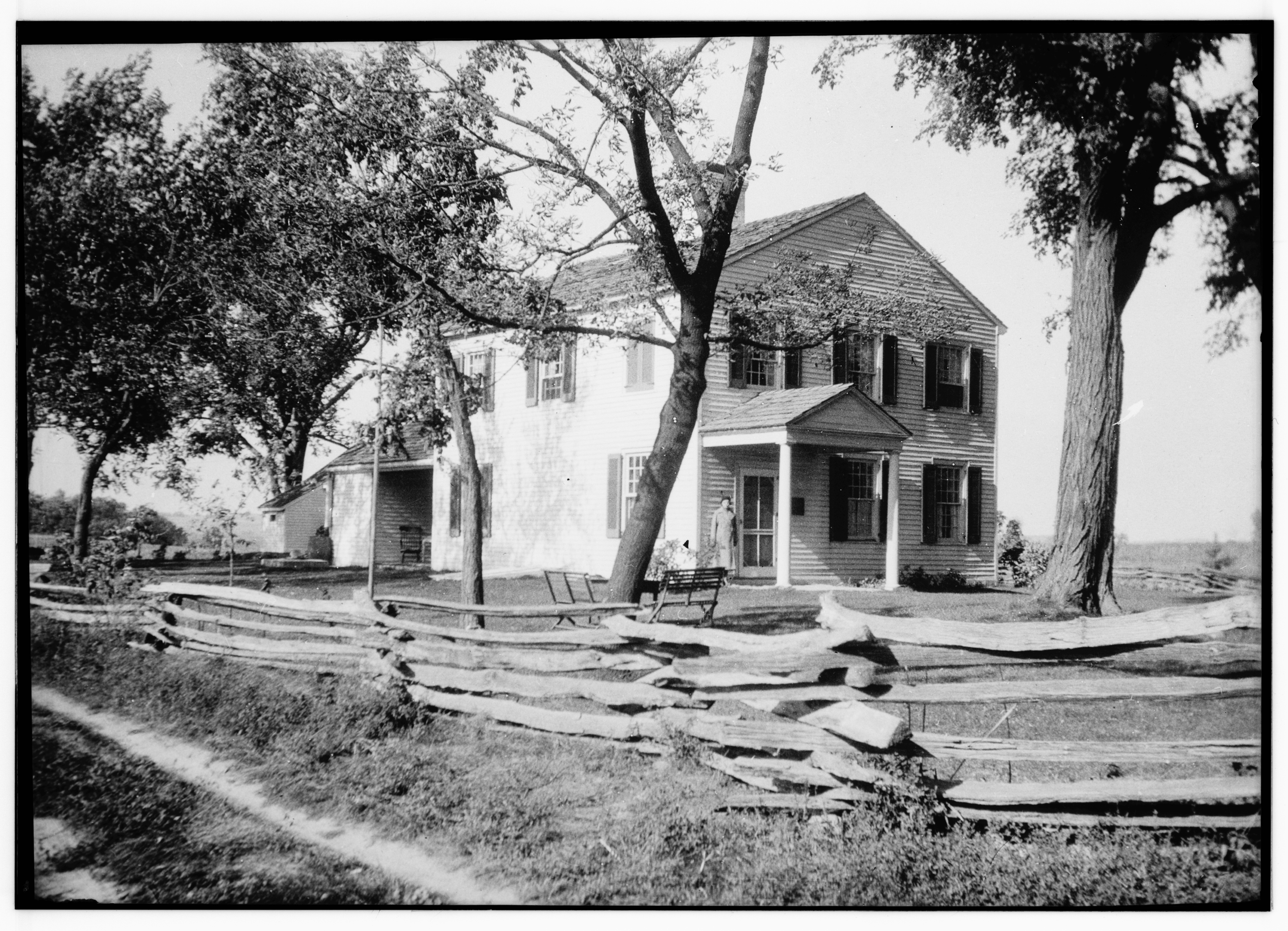
House in early 20th century

The Fort Winnebago Old Indian Agency House is the only known Indian Agency still located on its original location. Known as the Historic Indian Agency House, it is also an original structure associated with the fort. It was erected in 1832 by the U.S. Government as a residence and office for Indian sub-Agent John H. Kinzie, who served as a liaison between the local Ho Chunk (also known as Winnebago) Nation and the U.S. Government, and his wife, Juliette Augusta Magill Kinzie. Juliette later wrote a book about the couple's experiences during this time entitled 'Wau-Bun, the "Early Day" in the Northwest'. It has been operated as a museum since 1932 by The National Society of the Colonial Dames of America in the State of Wisconsin. Artifacts and displays include items about Native American culture. It is open to the public for visitation May 15 through October 15 each year. It was added to the National Register of Historic Places in 1972.
