= George Ronan =

- Born: c. 1783 or 1784; New York
- Died: 15 August 1812; Illinois Territory (now Chicago, Illinois)
- Military career
- Allegiance: United States of America
- Branch: United States Army
- Service years: 1811 – 1812
- Rank: Ensign
- Unit: 1st Infantry Regiment
- Conflicts: War of 1812; *Fort Dearborn Massacre

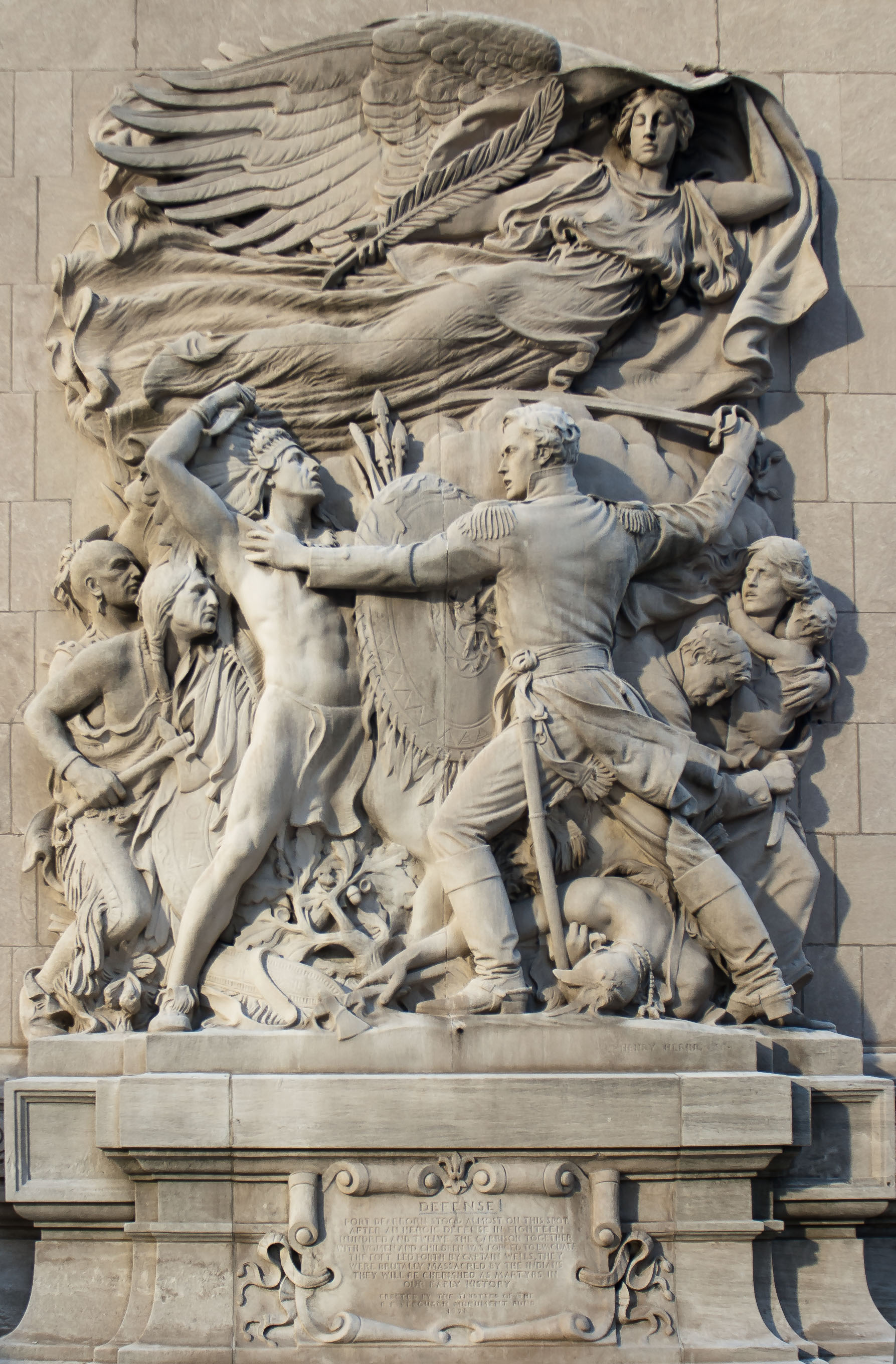
Bas-relief (1928) of sword-waving junior officer attempting to defend civilians at Battle of Fort Dearborn

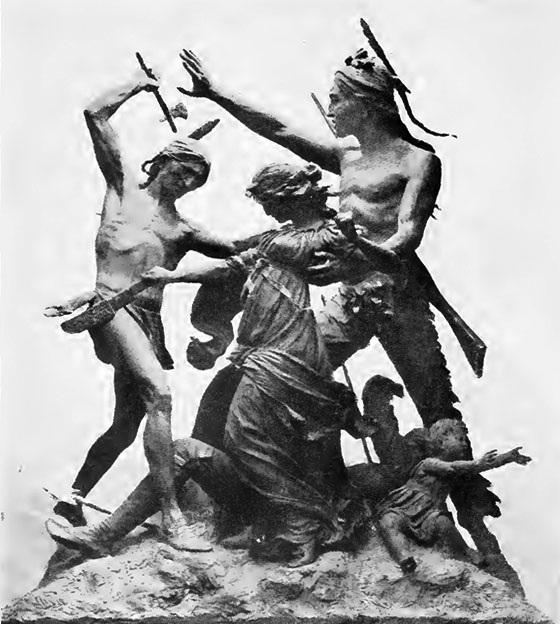
Stylized massacre scene (1893), with Ronan's body at foot of sculptural group

Ensign George Ronan was a commissioned officer of the United States Army. Educated at West Point and commissioned as an officer in the 1st Infantry Regiment in 1811, he was assigned to duty at Fort Dearborn, a frontier post at the mouth of the Chicago River. Just over one year later Ronan was killed in combat in the Battle of Fort Dearborn. He was the first member of the West Point Corps of Cadets to perish in battle.

== Military service ==
George Ronan attended the United States Military Academy for almost three years, from June 1808 to March 1811. At the time Ronan matriculated, the fledgling institute of military education was six years old, and he accepted his commission in the academy's ninth year. A trickle of shako-clad cadets graduated from the then-tiny institution of higher military training to take up duty stations in sensitive security points up and down the young United States. One of the most threatened positions was a small stockaded fort and associated fur trading post near the southern tip of Lake Michigan. Although the Chicago River and its hinterland was officially part of the United States, the Fort Dearborn soldiers and fur traders were sharply outnumbered by adjacent bands of Native Americans. The predominant Chicago River tribe was the Potawatomi nation, a group of clans who retained their loyalty to the British even though their land had been nominally ceded to the US by the 1783 Treaty of Paris.

On the North American Great Lakes, the years immediately prior to the breakout of the War of 1812 were characterized by increasingly embittered competition between British-Canadian fur traders and American merchants, including traders aligned with the interest of the powerful John Jacob Astor of the American Fur Company. Native Americans who were embedded in British-aligned fur trading and kinship networks were aware of the advance of the American frontiersmen into southern Indiana and Illinois Territory. Although Ronan did not know it, his 1811-1812 assignment to Fort Dearborn was a duty posting to a spark point.

Ronan is described by survivors as a high-spirited young ensign who did not get along well with his commanding officer, fort commander Captain Nathan Heald. Heald, possibly in retaliation, ordered Ronan to undertake a series of increasingly dangerous operations outside the fort walls in ultimately futile efforts to knit together the tiny band of French-speaking, English-speaking, and Native American-speaking farmers and traders who lived in cabins scattered up and down the Chicago River. When war broke out, Heald received orders to evacuate his post and remove his garrison to Fort Wayne, Indiana. The news of the fort's evacuation, scheduled for August 15, 1812, emboldened the Chicago "British band" of Potawatomi, who took a position two miles south of the doomed stockade along the shore of Lake Michigan. On the morning of August 15, Ronan's attempt to help lead a knot of civilian refugees — part of the overall 93-person column of evacuees — ran into an ambush. Witnesses saw Ronan continuing to struggle even after suffering a mortal wound, and he allegedly accounted for two hostile warriors before his death.

== Legacy ==
Survivors believed that the spot where Ensign George Ronan was struck down was at or close to what later became the intersection of 21st Street and Indiana Avenue, located in the Prairie Avenue neighborhood of Chicago's Near South Side.

Ronan was the first West Point graduate to be killed in action. As an "ensign", the lowest rank of commissioned officer in 1811–1812, Ronan held a rank equivalent to that of the subsequent rank of second lieutenant, and is sometimes referred to as such.

Sculptor Henry Hering, in his 1928 "Defense" mounted on the Michigan Avenue Bridge adjacent to the site of Fort Dearborn, centered the bas-relief on an unnamed junior officer who was depicted performing the role — protection of civilians — that Ronan tried to carry out in reality. Ronan Park, a 3-acre (0.01 km^{2}) unit of the Chicago Park District located at 3000 West Argyle Street on the Chicago River, is named in Ronan's honor.

== Sources ==
- Fredriksen, John C. (2009). The United States Army in the War of 1812: concise biographies of commanders and operational histories of regiments, with bibliographies of published and primary resources. Jefferson, N.C: McFarland & Co. ISBN 978-0786441433.
