= William Washington Gordon Monument =

Public monument in Georgia, USA

Coordinates: 32°04′41″N 81°05′32″W

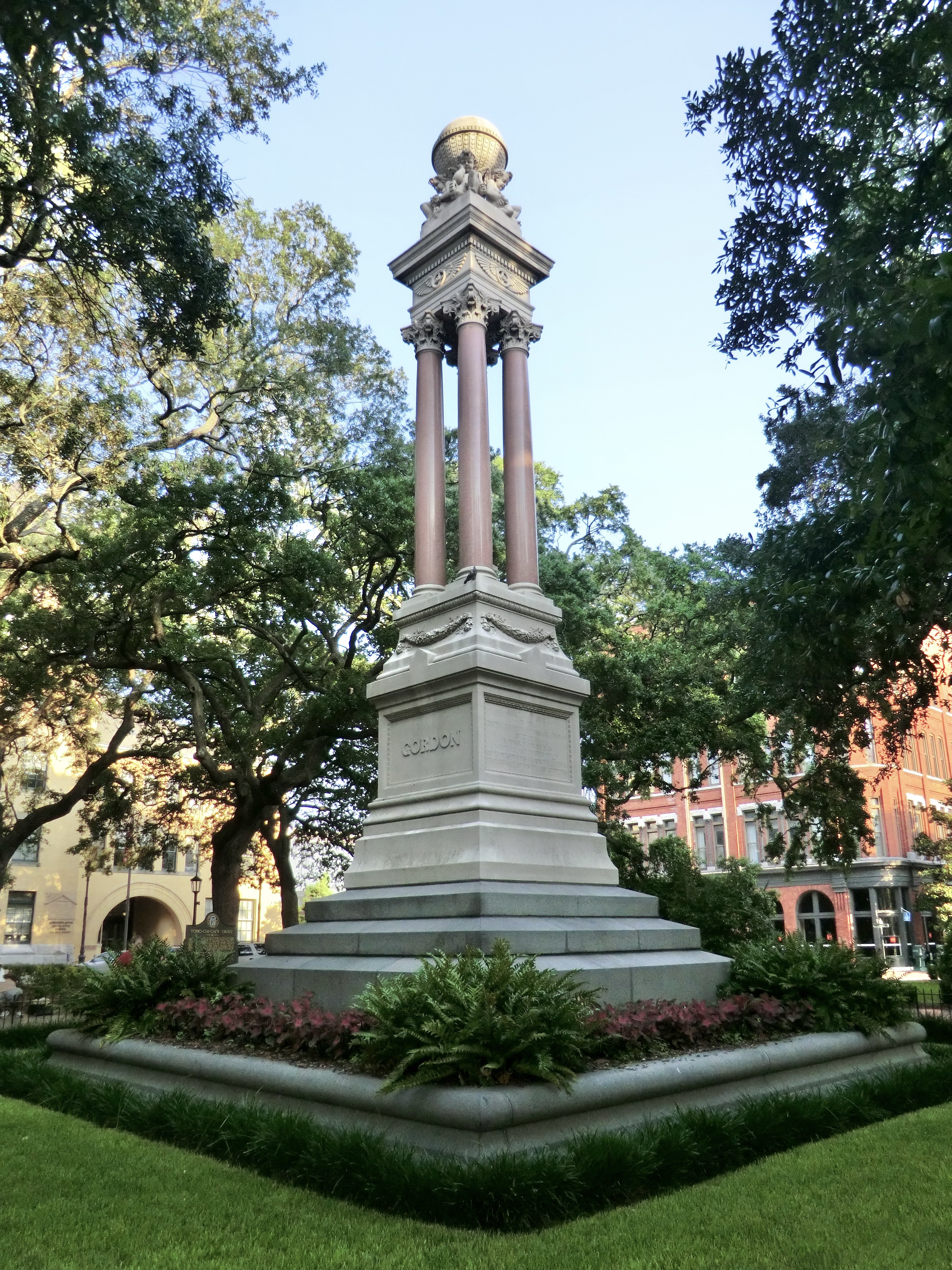
- William Washington Gordon Monument (2013)
- Location: Wright Square, Savannah, Georgia, United States
- Designer: Henry Van Brunt; Frank M. Howe
- Material: Granite; Marble
- Height: 47 feet (14 m)
- Dedicated date: 1883
- Dedicated to: William Washington Gordon

The William Washington Gordon Monument is a public monument in Savannah, Georgia, United States. Located in Wright Square, the monument honors politician and businessman William Washington Gordon and was designed by Henry Van Brunt and Frank M. Howe. It was completed in 1883.

== History ==
William Washington Gordon was a railroad baron during the mid-1800s who served as the founder and first president of the Central of Georgia Railway. He was also the grandfather of Juliette Gordon Low, the founder of the Girl Scouts of the USA. In 1842, Gordon died at the age of 46. Several years later, in 1883, efforts were underway to erect a monument in honor of Gordon in Savannah. At Wright Square, a pyramid of rocks that marked the burial place of Tomochichi was removed to make way for the monument. Tomochichi was a Yamacraw chief who aided the early settlers of Savannah, and after his death in 1739, he was buried at Wright Square, with General James Oglethorpe serving as one of his pallbearers. Tomochichi's body was relocated from the center of the square to the southeast corner to make way for the new monument. Nellie Kinzie Gordon, Gordon's daughter-in-law and the first president of the Georgia branch of the National Society of the Colonial Dames of America, later advocated for a new monument to be erected in honor of Tomochichi, which occurred several years later in 1899. The monument to Gordon, completed with funds from the Central of Georgia Railway, was completed in 1883. It was designed by the architects Henry Van Brunt and Frank M. Howe.

In 1958, a Georgia historical marker was erected in the square that detailed the history of the monument and surrounding area.

== Design ==
The monument consists of a granite pedestal supporting four marble columns. An urn is located between these columns, and at the top of the monument is a globe. One side of the monument features a carving of a train on a trestle bridge, while another two sides feature the following inscriptions:

William Washington Gordon Born June 17, 1796 Died March 20 1842 The Pioneer Of Works Of Internal Improvement In His Native State And First President Of The Central Rail Road And Banking Company Of Georgia To Which He Gave His Time His Talents And Finally His Life

Erected A.D. 1882 By The Central Railroad And Banking Company Of Georgia In Honor Of A Brave Man + A Faithful And Devoted Officer And To Preserve His Name In The Grateful Remembrance Of His Fellow Citizens

== See also ==
- 1883 in art
