= Battle of Fort Dearborn =

War of 1812 battle in Illinois, US

- Part of the War of 1812
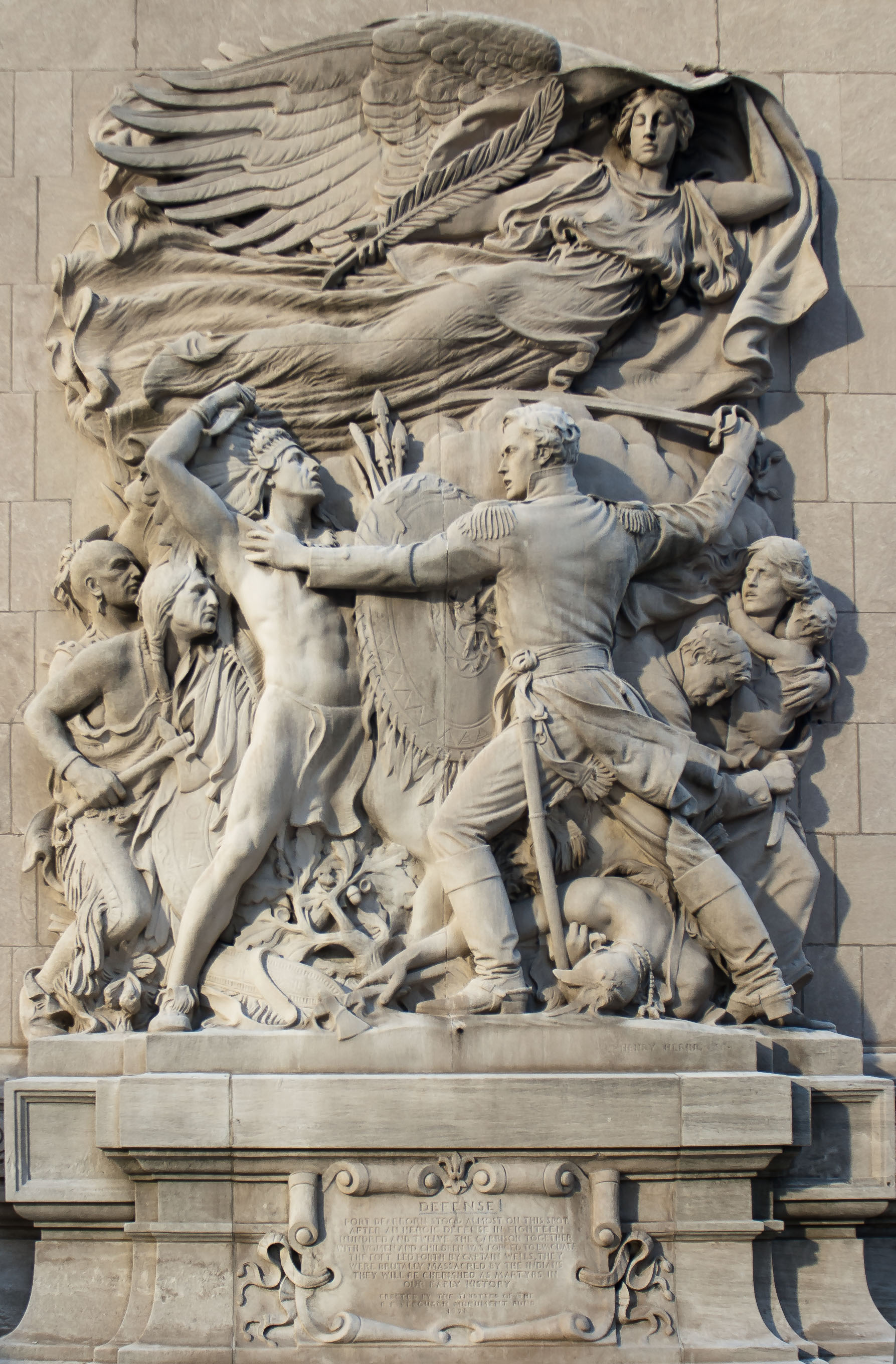
- The Battle of Fort Dearborn is commemorated on the site of Fort Dearborn with Defense a 1928 sculpture by Henry Hering that adorns the southeastern tender's house of the DuSable Bridge
Date	August 15, 1812
Location	Present-day Chicago, Illinois 41°51′28″N 87°37′9″W
Result	Potawatomi victory

Belligerents
Potawatomi	United States

Commanders and leaders
Chief Blackbird	Capt. Nathan Heald (WIA); Capt. William Wells †

Strength
400–500	66 military + 27 dependents

Casualties and losses
15	Military; 38 killed; 28 captured; Civilian; 14 killed; 13 captured

The Battle of Fort Dearborn (sometimes called the Fort Dearborn Massacre) was an engagement between United States troops, militia and Miami native auxiliaries, against Potawatomi Native Americans that took place on August 15, 1812, near Fort Dearborn, then part of Illinois Territory in the Chicago area. The battle, part of the War of 1812, followed the evacuation of the fort ordered by the commander of the United States Army of the Northwest, William Hull. The battle lasted about 15 minutes and resulted in a complete victory for the Potawatomi. After the battle, Fort Dearborn was burned down. Some of the soldiers and settlers who had been taken captive were later ransomed.

Following the battle, the federal government became convinced that all Indians had to be removed from the territory and the vicinity of any settlements, as settlers continued to migrate to the area. The fort was later rebuilt in 1816.

== Background ==
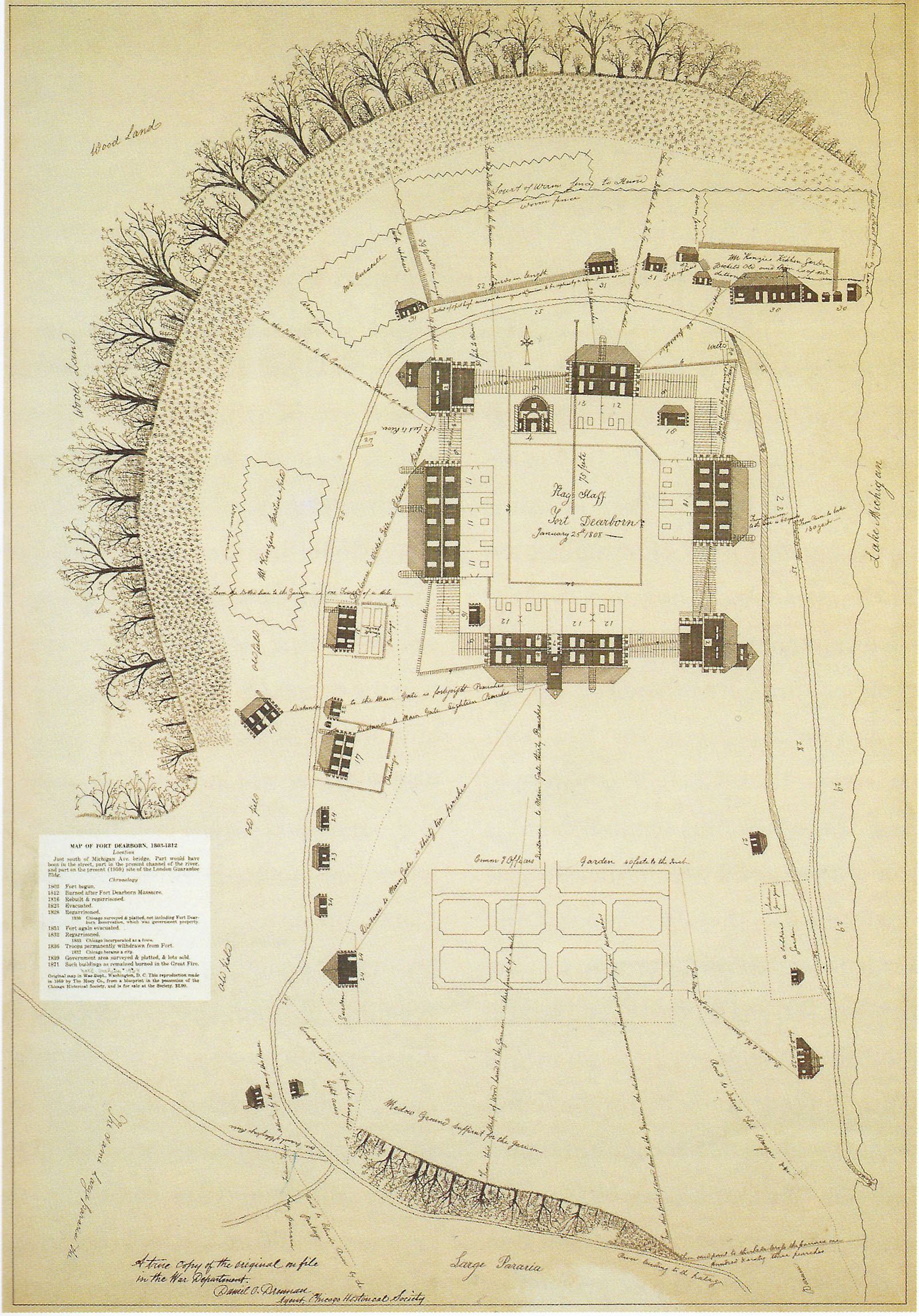
Plan of Fort Dearborn drawn by John Whistler in 1808

Fort Dearborn was constructed by United States troops under the command of Captain John Whistler in 1803. It was located on the south bank of the main stem of the Chicago River in what is now the Loop community area of downtown Chicago. At the time, the area was seen as wilderness. In the view of a later commander, Heald, it was "so remote from the civilized part of the world." The fort was named in honor of Henry Dearborn, then United States Secretary of War. It had been commissioned after the Northwest Indian War of 1785–1795 and the signing of the Treaty of Greenville at Fort Greenville (now Greenville, Ohio) on August 3, 1795. As part of the terms of the treaty, a coalition of Native Americans and frontiersmen, known as the Western Confederacy, turned over to the United States large parts of modern-day Ohio and various other parcels of land, including 6 square miles (16 km^{2}) centered on the mouth of the Chicago River.

The British Empire had ceded the Northwest Territory, comprising what is now Ohio, Indiana, Illinois, Michigan, Wisconsin, and parts of Minnesota, to the United States at the Treaty of Paris in 1783. However, the area had been the subject of dispute between the Native American nations and the United States since the passage of the Northwest Ordinance in 1787. The Indian Nations followed Tenskwatawa, the Shawnee prophet and the brother of Tecumseh. Tenskwatawa had a vision of purifying his society by expelling the "children of the Evil Spirit," the American settlers. Tenskwatawa and Tecumseh formed a confederation of numerous tribes to block American expansion. The British saw the Native American nations as valuable allies and a buffer to their Canadian colonies and provided them arms. Resistance to American expansion in the Northwest further worsened Anglo-American relations. The confederation's raids hindered American access to potentially-valuable farmlands, mineral deposits, and fur trade areas.

In 1810, as a result of a long running feud, Captain Whistler and other senior officers at Fort Dearborn were removed. Whistler was replaced by Captain Nathan Heald, who had been stationed at Fort Wayne, Indiana. Heald was dissatisfied with his new posting and immediately applied for and received a leave of absence to spend the winter in Massachusetts. On his return journey to Fort Dearborn, he visited Kentucky, where he married Rebekah Wells, the daughter of Samuel Wells, and they traveled together to the fort in June 1811.

As the United States and Britain moved towards war, antipathy between the settlers and Native Americans in the Fort Dearborn area increased. In the summer of 1811, British emissaries tried to enlist the support of Native Americans in the region by telling them that the British would help them to resist the encroaching American settlement. On April 6, 1812, a band of Winnebago Indians murdered Liberty White, an American, and John B. Cardin, a French Canadian, at a farm called Hardscrabble, which was located on the south branch of the Chicago River, in the area now called Bridgeport. News of the murder was carried to Fort Dearborn by a soldier of the garrison, named John Kelso, and a small boy, who had managed to escape from the farm. Following the murder, some nearby settlers moved into the fort, and the rest fortified themselves in a house that had belonged to Charles Jouett, a Native American agent. Fifteen men from the civilian population were organized into a militia by Captain Heald and were armed with guns and ammunition from the fort.

== Battle ==
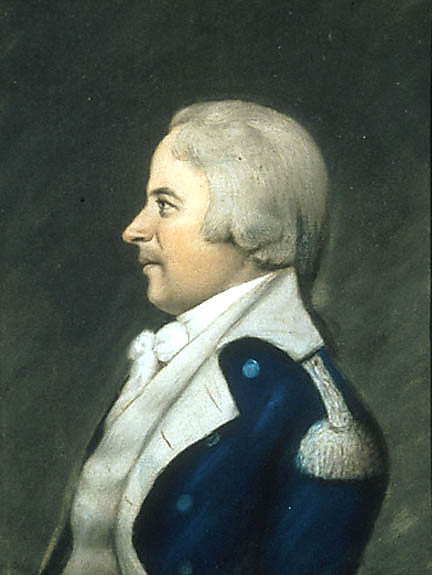
William Hull

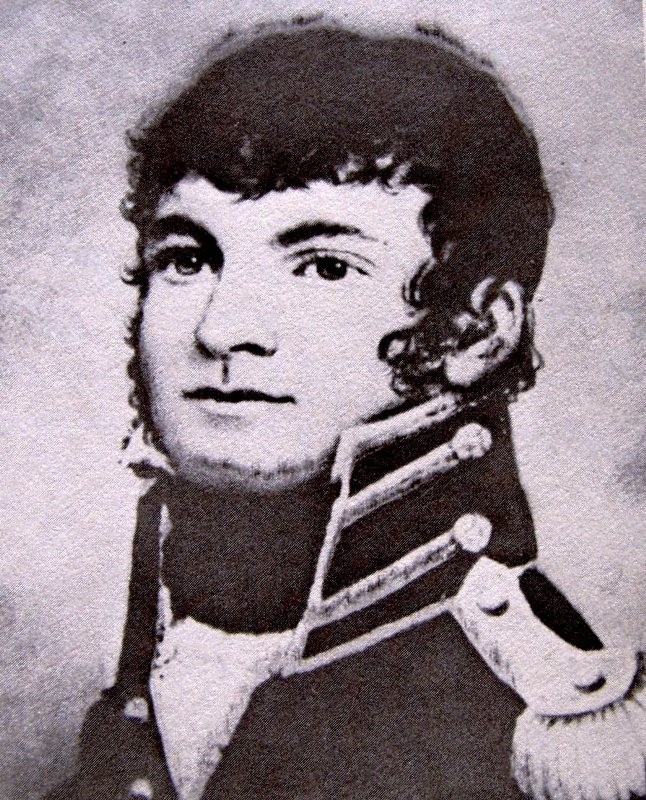
William Wells

On June 18, 1812, the United States declared war on the British Empire, and on July 17, British forces had captured Fort Mackinac near the north coast of Lake Michigan. On July 29, General William Hull received news of the fall of Fort Mackinac and immediately sent orders to Heald to evacuate Fort Dearborn near the south coast of Lake Michigan, for fear that it could no longer be adequately supplied with provisions. In his letter to Heald, which arrived at Fort Dearborn on August 9, Hull ordered Heald to destroy all the arms and ammunition and to give the remaining goods to friendly Indians in the hope of attaining an escort to Fort Wayne. (Note: A facsimile copy of Hull's letter to Heald appears in Quaife 1913, p. 217) Hull also sent a copy of these orders to Fort Wayne to the southeast of Lake Michigan, with additional instructions to provide Heald with all the information, advice and assistance within their power. In the following days, the sub-Native American agent at Fort Wayne, Captain William Wells, who was the uncle of Heald's wife, Rebekah, assembled a group of about 30 Miami Native Americans. Wells, Corporal Walter K. Jordan, and the Miamis traveled to Fort Dearborn to provide an escort for the evacuees. (Note: Wells had been brought up by the Miami, and was married to Wanagapeth, the daughter of Miami Chief, Little Turtle.)

Wells arrived at Fort Dearborn on August 12 or 13 (sources differ), and on August 14, Heald held a council with the Potawatomi leaders to inform them of his intention to evacuate the fort. The Native Americans believed that Heald told them that he would distribute the firearms, ammunition, provisions, and whiskey among them and that if they would send a band of Potawatomis to escort them safely to Fort Wayne, he would pay them a large sum of money. However, Heald ordered all the surplus arms, ammunition, and liquor destroyed "fearing that [the Native Americans] would make bad use of it if put in their possession." On August 14, a Potawatomi chief called Black Partridge warned Heald that the young men of the tribe intended to attack and that he could no longer restrain them.

At 9:00 am on August 15, the garrison, comprising, according to Heald's report, 54 US regulars, 12 militiamen, (Note: Three of the 15 militiamen had deserted shortly after the militia had been formed.) nine women and 18 children, left Fort Dearborn with the intention of marching to Fort Wayne. Wells led the group with some of the Miami escorts, while the rest of the Miamis were positioned at the rear. About 1 1/2 miles (2.4 km) south of Fort Dearborn, a band of Potawatomi warriors ambushed the garrison. Heald reported that, upon discovering that the Indians were preparing to ambush from behind a dune, the company marched to the top of the dune, fired off a round and charged at the Native Americans.

The maneuver separated the cavalry from the wagons, which allowed the overwhelming Native American force to charge into the gap, divide, and surround both groups. During the ensuing battle, some of the Native Americans charged at the wagon train that contained the women and children and the provisions. The wagons were defended by the militia, as well as Ensign George Ronan and the fort physician Van Voorhis. The officers and militia were killed, along with two of the women and most of the children. Wells disengaged from the main battle and attempted to ride to the aid of those at the wagons. In doing so, he was brought down. According to eyewitness accounts, he fought off many Native Americans before being killed, and a group of Indians immediately cut out his heart and ate it to absorb his courage.

The battle lasted about 15 minutes, when Heald and the surviving soldiers withdrew to an area of elevated ground on the prairie. They surrendered to the Native Americans, who took them as prisoners to their camp near Fort Dearborn. In his report, Heald detailed the American loss at 26 regulars, all 12 of the militia, two women and twelve children killed, with the other 28 regulars, seven women, and six children taken prisoner. Survivors of the massacre filed different accounts regarding the Miami warriors. Some said that they fought for the Americans, and others said they did not fight at all.

== Accounts ==
The recollections of a number of the survivors of the battle have been published. Heald's story was recorded on September 22, 1812, by Charles Askin in his diary, Heald also wrote brief accounts of events in his journal and in an official report of the battle. Walter Jordan recorded his version of events in a letter to his wife dated October 12, 1812. Helm wrote a detailed narrative of events, but his fear of being court-martialed for his criticism of Heald made him delay publication until 1814. The narrative was lost for nearly a century. It was found by Nellie Kinzie Gordon, wife of William Washington Gordon II, late in her life, and she published it under the title The Fort Dearborn Massacre, by Lieutenant Helm. John Kinzie's recollections of the battle were recorded by Henry Schoolcraft in August 1820.

The accounts of details of the conflict are discrepant, particularly in their attribution of blame for the battle. Juliette Augusta Magill Kinzie's Wau-Bun: The Early Day in the Northwest, which was first published in 1856, provides the traditional account of the conflict. However, it is based on family stories and is regarded as historically inaccurate. Nonetheless, its popular acceptance was surprisingly strong.

The Battle of Fort Dearborn has also been referred to as the "Fort Dearborn Massacre" by the defending Americans. The battle has been claimed a massacre due to the large number of Americans killed including women and children, as opposed to the relatively-smaller Potawatomi losses incurred. The conflict has also been argued to have been a measure of self-defense on the part of the Potawatomi.

== Aftermath ==
After the battle, the Native Americans took their prisoners to their camp near Fort Dearborn and the fort was burned to the ground. The region remained empty of U.S. citizens until after the war ended. Some of the prisoners died in captivity, and others were later ransomed. The fort, however, was rebuilt in 1816.

General William Henry Harrison, who was not present at the battle, later claimed the Miami had fought against the Americans, and he used the Battle of Fort Dearborn as a pretext to attack Miami villages. Miami Chief, Pacanne, and his nephew, Jean Baptiste Richardville, accordingly ended their neutrality in the War of 1812 and allied with the British.

== Historical perspective ==
Seen from the perspective of the War of 1812, and the larger conflict between Britain and France which precipitated it, this was a very small and brief battle, but it ultimately had larger consequences in the territory. Arguably, for the Native Americans, it was an example of "winning the battle but losing the war" since the US later pursued a policy of removing the tribes from the region, resulting in the 1833 Treaty of Chicago, which was marked at its culmination in 1835 by the last great Native American war dance in the nascent city. Thereafter, the Potawatomi and other tribes were moved further west.

== Location and Park ==
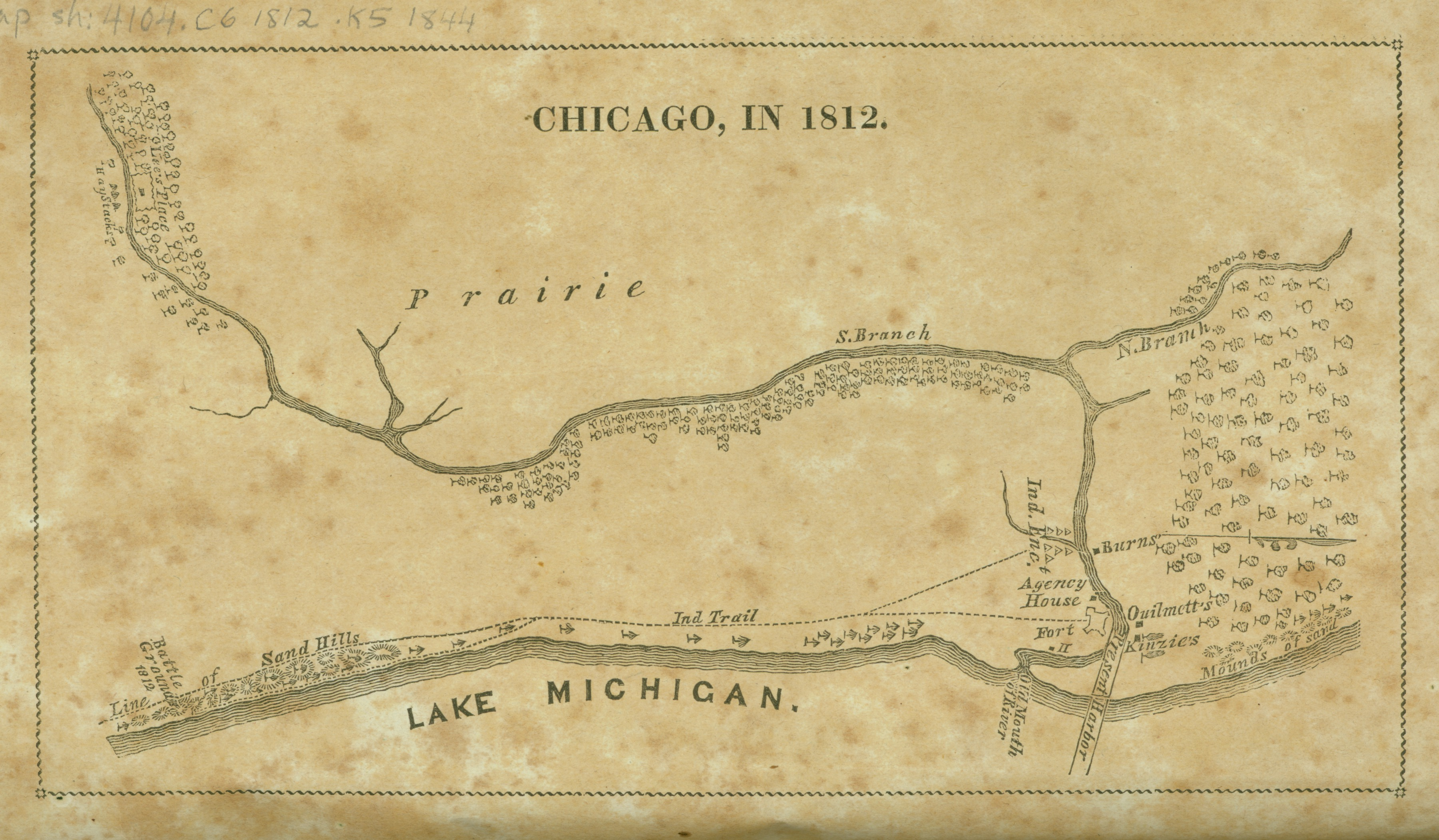
Map, reproduced from Andreas 1884, p. 81, showing Chicago in 1812 with the sites of Fort Dearborn by the river and the battle marked at left (west is up)

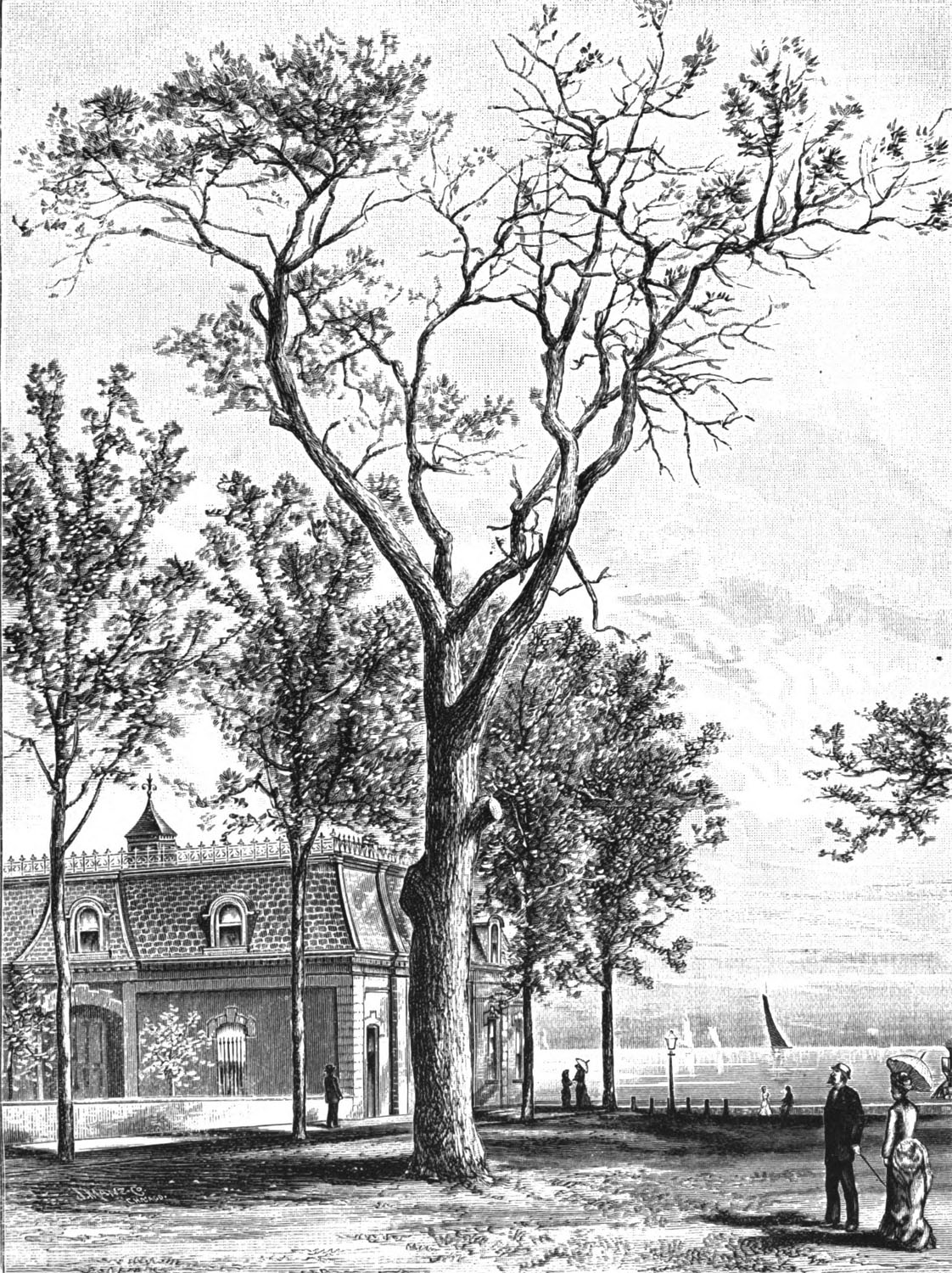
1884 drawing of the tree said to have marked the site of the start of the battle

Eyewitness accounts place the battle on the lake shore somewhere between 1 and 2 miles (1.6 and 3.2 km) south of Fort Dearborn. Heald's official report said the battle occurred 1 1/2 miles (2.4 km) south of the fort, placing the battle at what is now the intersection of Roosevelt Road (12th Street) and Michigan Avenue. Juliette Kinzie, shortly before her death in 1870, stated that the battle had started by a large cottonwood tree, which still stood on 18th Street between Prairie Avenue and the lake. The tree was supposed to have been the last remaining of a grove of trees that had been saplings at the time of the battle.

The tree was blown down in a storm on May 16, 1894, and a portion of its trunk was preserved at the Chicago Historical Society. The historian Harry A. Musham points out that the testimony relating to the tree is all second hand and came from people who had settled in Chicago more than 20 years after the battle. Moreover, based on the diameter of the preserved section of trunk (about 3 feet (0.91 m)) he estimated the age of the tree at the time that it was blown over at no more than 80 years and, therefore, he asserted that it could not have been growing at the time of the battle. Nevertheless, the site at 18th Street and Prairie Avenue has become the location traditionally associated with the battle, and on the battle's 197th anniversary in 2009, the Chicago Park District, the Prairie District Neighborhood Alliance and other community partners dedicated "Battle of Fort Dearborn Park" near the site at 18th Street and Calumet Avenue.

== Monuments ==
In 1893, George Pullman had a sculpture he had commissioned from Carl Rohl-Smith erected near his house. It portrays the rescue of Margaret Helm, the stepdaughter of Chicago resident John Kinzie and wife of Lieutenant Linai Taliaferro Helm, by Potawatomi chief Black Partridge, who led her and some others to Lake Michigan and helped her escape by boat. The monument was moved to the lobby of the Chicago Historical Society in 1931. In the 1970s, however, Native American groups protested the display of the monument, and it was removed.

In the 1990s, the statue was reinstalled near 18th Street and Prairie Avenue, close to its original site, at the time of the revival of the Prairie Avenue Historic District. It was later removed for conservation reasons by the Office of Public Art of the Chicago Department of Cultural Affairs. There are some efforts to reinstall the monument, but it is meeting resistance from the Chicago American Indian Center.

The battle is also memorialized with a sculpture by Henry Hering, called Defense, which is located on the south western tender's house of the Michigan Avenue Bridge, which partially covers the site of Fort Dearborn. There are also memorials in Chicago to individuals who fought in the battle. William Wells is commemorated in the naming of Wells Street, a north–south street and part of the original 1830 58-block plat of Chicago, while Nathan Heald is commemorated in the naming of Heald Square. Ronan Park on the city's Far North Side honors Ensign Ronan, who was the first West Point graduate to die in battle.

== See also ==
- List of battles fought in Illinois

== Sources ==
- Andreas, Alfred Theodore (1884). History of Chicago: From the Earliest Period to the Present Time. Vol. 1. Chicago: A. T. Andreas.
- Currey, J. Seymour (1912). The Story of Old Fort Dearborn. Chicago: A. C. McClurg & Co.
- Helm, Linai Taliaferro (1912). Gordon, Nelly Kinzie (ed.). The Fort Dearborn Massacre. Rand, McNally & Company.
- Heidler, David S.; Heidler, Jeanne T., eds. (1997). Encyclopedia of the War of 1812. Annapolis, Md.: Naval Institute Press. ISBN 1-59114-362-4.
- Keating, Ann Durkin (2012). Rising up from Indian country: the battle of Fort Dearborn and the birth of Chicago. Chicago and London: University of Chicago Press. ISBN 9780226428963.
- Kinzie, Juliette Augusta Magill (1844). Narrative of the Massacre at Chicago, August 15, 1812, and of some preceding events. Chicago: Ellis & Fergus.
- Kinzie, Juliette (1856). Wau-Bun, the "Early Day" in the North-West. Derby and Jackson.
- Kirkland, Joseph (August 1892). "The Chicago Massacre in 1812". Magazine of American History. 28 (2): 111–122.
- Quaife, Milo Milton (1913). Chicago and the Old Northwest, 1673–1835. The University of Chicago Press.
- Quaife, Milo M. (March 1915). "The Fort Dearborn Masscre". The Mississippi Valley Historical Review. 1 (4): 566–570. doi:10.2307/1886956. JSTOR 1886956.
- Quaife, Milo Milton (1933). Checagou: From Indian Wigwam to Modern City 1673–1835. The University of Chicago Press.
