= John Kinzie =

American fur trader

- Born: December 23, 1763; Quebec City, Province of Quebec, British America
- Died: June 6, 1828 (aged 64); Chicago, Illinois, U.S.
- Resting place: Graceland Cemetery
- Known for: First permanent European settler in Chicago
- Spouses: Margaret McKinzie; Eleanor Lytle McKillip Kinzie
- Children: John H. Kinzie, Ellen Marion Kinzie, Maria Kinzie, Robert Allen Kinzie

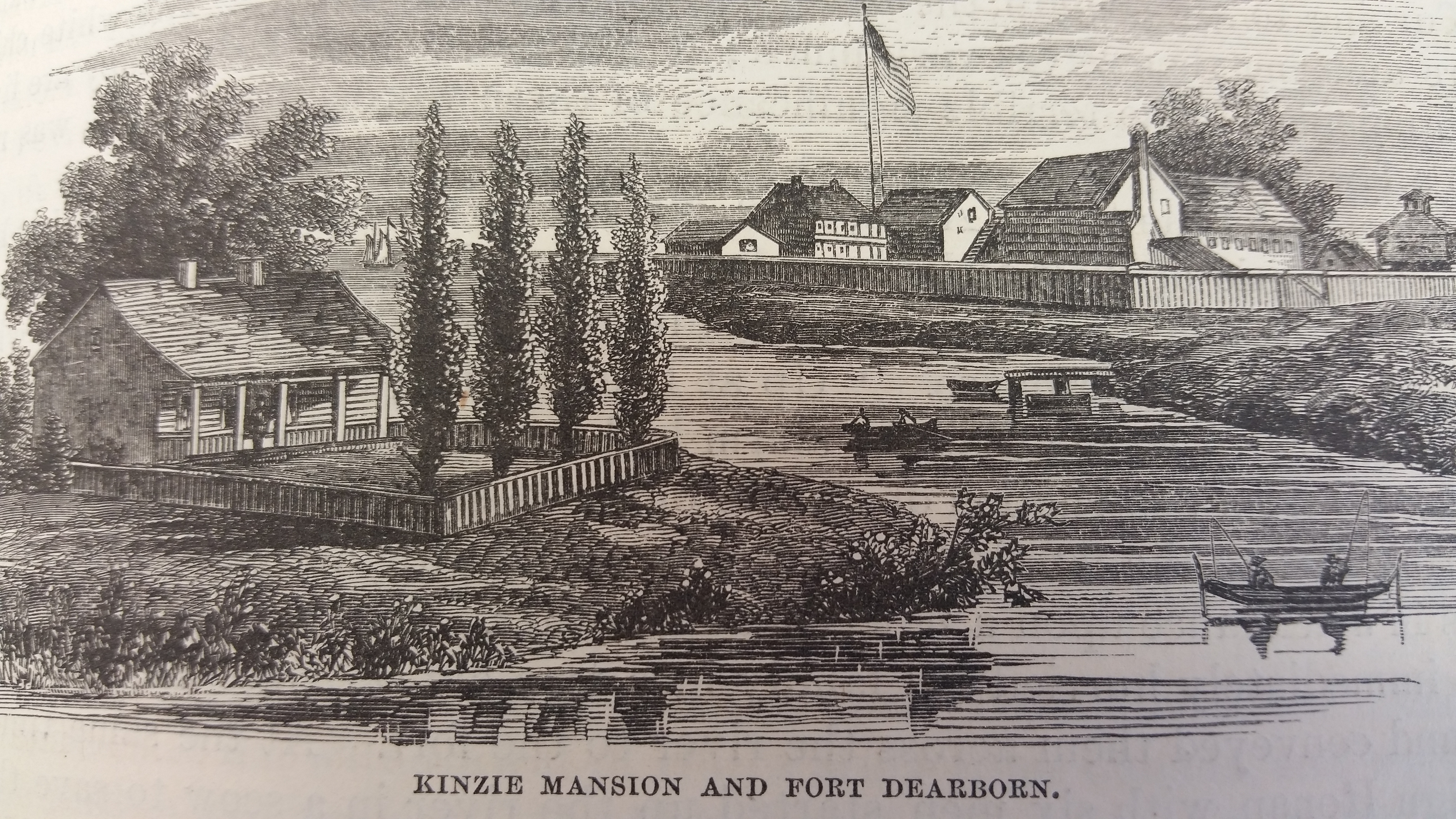
Kinzie Mansion and Fort Dearborn from the west

John Kinzie (December 23, 1763 – June 6, 1828) was an American fur trader from Quebec who first operated in Detroit and what became the Northwest Territory of the United States. A partner of William Burnett from Canada, about 1802-1803 Kinzie moved with his wife and child to the Chicago area, where they were among the first permanent Anglo-American settlers. Kinzie Street (400N) in Chicago is named for him. Their daughter Ellen Marion Kinzie, born in 1805, was not the first child of European descent born in the settlement. That title goes to Eulalia Pelletier, the granddaughter of Chicago's first permanent non-indigenous settler, Jean Baptiste Pointe DuSable.

In 1812 Kinzie murdered Jean La Lime, who worked as an interpreter at Fort Dearborn in Chicago. This was known as "the first murder in Chicago".

During the War of 1812, when living in Detroit, Kinzie was accused of treason by the British and imprisoned on a ship for transport to Great Britain. After escaping, he returned to American territory, settling again in Chicago by 1816. He lived there the rest of his years.

== Early life and first family ==
Kinzie was born in Quebec City, Canada (then in the Colonial Province of Quebec) to John and Anne McKenzie, Scots-Irish immigrants. His father died before Kinzie was a year old, and his mother remarried. In 1773, the boy was apprenticed to George Farnham, a silversmith. Some of the jewelry created by Kinzie has been found in archaeological digs in Ohio.

By 1777, Kinzie had become a trader in Detroit, where he worked for William Burnett. As a trader, he became familiar with local Native American peoples and likely learned the dominant language. He developed trading at the Kekionga, a center of the Miami people.

In 1785, Kinzie helped rescue two American citizens, sisters, who had been kidnapped in 1775 from Virginia by the Shawnee and adopted into the tribe. One of the girls, Margaret McKinzie, married him; her sister Elizabeth married his companion Clark. Margaret lived with Kinzie in Detroit and had three children with him. After several years, she left Kinzie and Detroit and returned to Virginia with their children. All three of the Kinzie children eventually moved as adults to Chicago.

In 1789, Kinzie lost his business in the Kekionga (modern Fort Wayne, Indiana) and had to move further from the western U.S. frontier. The US was excluding Canadians from trade with the Native Americans in their territory. As the United States settlers continued to populate its western territory, Kinzie moved further west.

== Marriage and move to Chicago ==
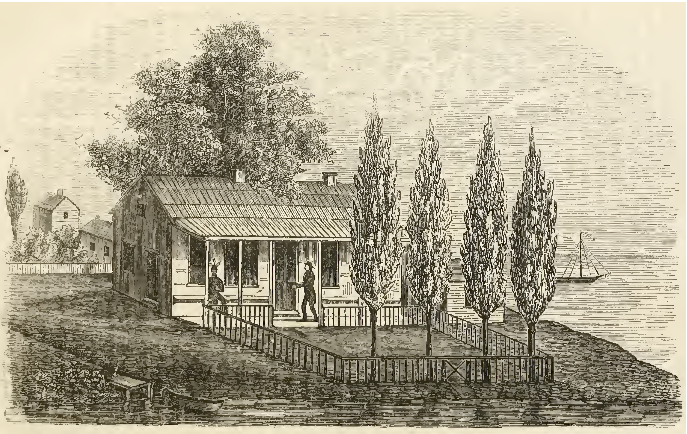
1857 drawing of John Kinzie house c. 1804, near the mouth of the Chicago River. The house was built by Jean Baptiste Point du Sable.

On March 10, 1798, Kinzie married again, to Eleanor Lytle McKillip. By the time they moved to Chicago, about 1802–1804, they had a year-old son, John. Eleanor bore him three more children in Chicago: Ellen Marion (born in 1805), Maria Indiana (1807), and Robert Allen (1810).

In 1804 Kinzie purchased the former house and lands of Jean Baptiste Point du Sable, located near the mouth of the Chicago River. That same year, Governor William Henry Harrison of the Indiana Territory appointed Kinzie as a justice of the peace.

== War of 1812 ==
After American citizens built Fort Dearborn, Kinzie's influence and reputation rose in the area; he was useful because of his relationship with the Native Americans. The War of 1812 began between Great Britain and the United States, and tensions rose on the northern frontier.

In June 1812, Kinzie killed Jean La Lime, who worked as an interpreter at Fort Dearborn. He fled to Milwaukee, then in Indian territory. While in Milwaukee, he met with pro-British Indians who were planning attacks on American settlements, including Chicago. Historians speculate that La Lime may have been informed on corruption related to purchasing supplies within the fort and thus been silenced. The case has been called "Chicago's first murder." It has also been proposed that Kinzie attempted to cover up his family's early real estate transactions, substituting Francis May as the original owner (who died after eating at the son's [James] home).

Although worried that Chicago would be on heightened alert, a force of as many as 500 Indians attacked the small garrison of soldiers, their support, and their families near the current intersection of 18th and Calumet, as they fled south along the lakeshore after evacuated the Fort. The Fort Dearborn attack took place on August 15, 1812, and left 53 dead, including women and children. Kinzie and his family, aided by Potawatomi Indians led by Billy Caldwell, escaped unharmed and returned to Detroit. Identifying as a British subject, Kinzie had a strong anti-American streak.

In 1813, the British arrested Kinzie and Jean Baptiste Chardonnay, also then living in Detroit, charging them with treason. They were accused of having corresponded with the enemy (the American General Harrison's army) while supplying gunpowder to chief Tecumseh's Indian forces, who were fighting alongside the British. Chardonnay escaped, but Kinzie was imprisoned on a ship for transport to England. When the ship was put into port in Nova Scotia to weather a storm, Kinzie escaped. He returned to American-held Detroit by 1814.

Although he had previously been a British subject, Kinzie switched to the United States. He returned to Chicago with his family in 1816 and lived there until his death in 1828.

During the 1820s, Kinzie served as a justice of the peace for the newly created Pike County, which at the time extended from the Mississippi River to Lake Michigan.

== Death and legacy ==
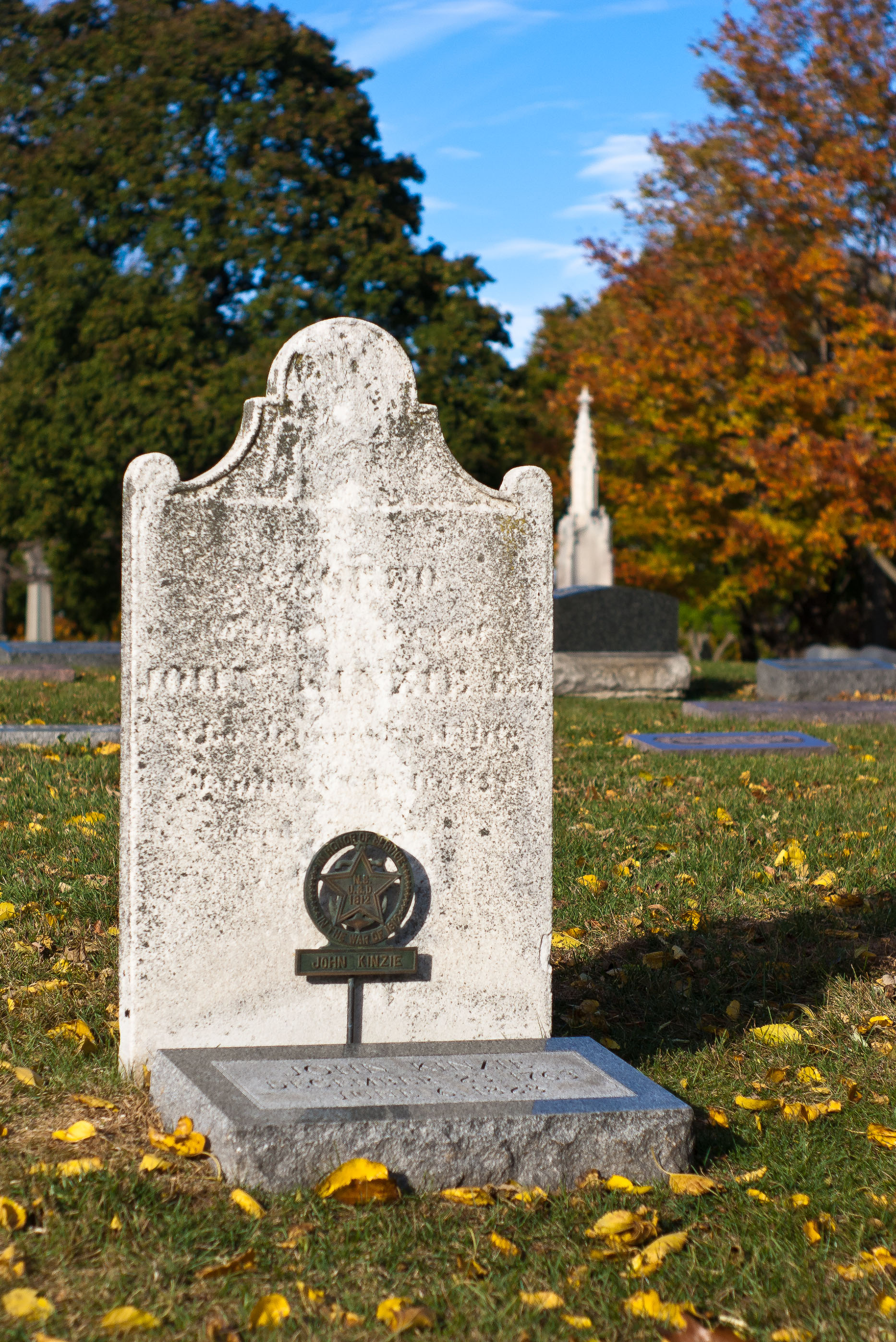
John Kinzie's grave in Graceland Cemetery

Kinzie suffered a stroke on June 6, 1828, and died a few hours later. Originally buried at the Fort Dearborn Cemetery, Kinzie's remains were moved to City Cemetery in 1835. When the cemetery was closed due to concerns it could contaminate the city's water supply, Kinzie's remains were moved to Graceland Cemetery.

- In 1837, Kinzie's son John H. Kinzie ran for the position of the first mayor of Chicago, losing to William Butler Ogden. He subsequently unsuccessfully ran twice more, in 1845 and in 1847.
- Walt Kinzie, Kinzie's grandson by his youngest son, Robert, played professional baseball.
- Maria Kinzie, a granddaughter, married George H. Steuart, a captain in the US cavalry from Maryland. He later served as a general in the Confederate Army.
- His great-granddaughter, Juliette Gordon Low, was the founder of the Girl Scouts of the USA.
