= William Washington Gordon II =

American politician

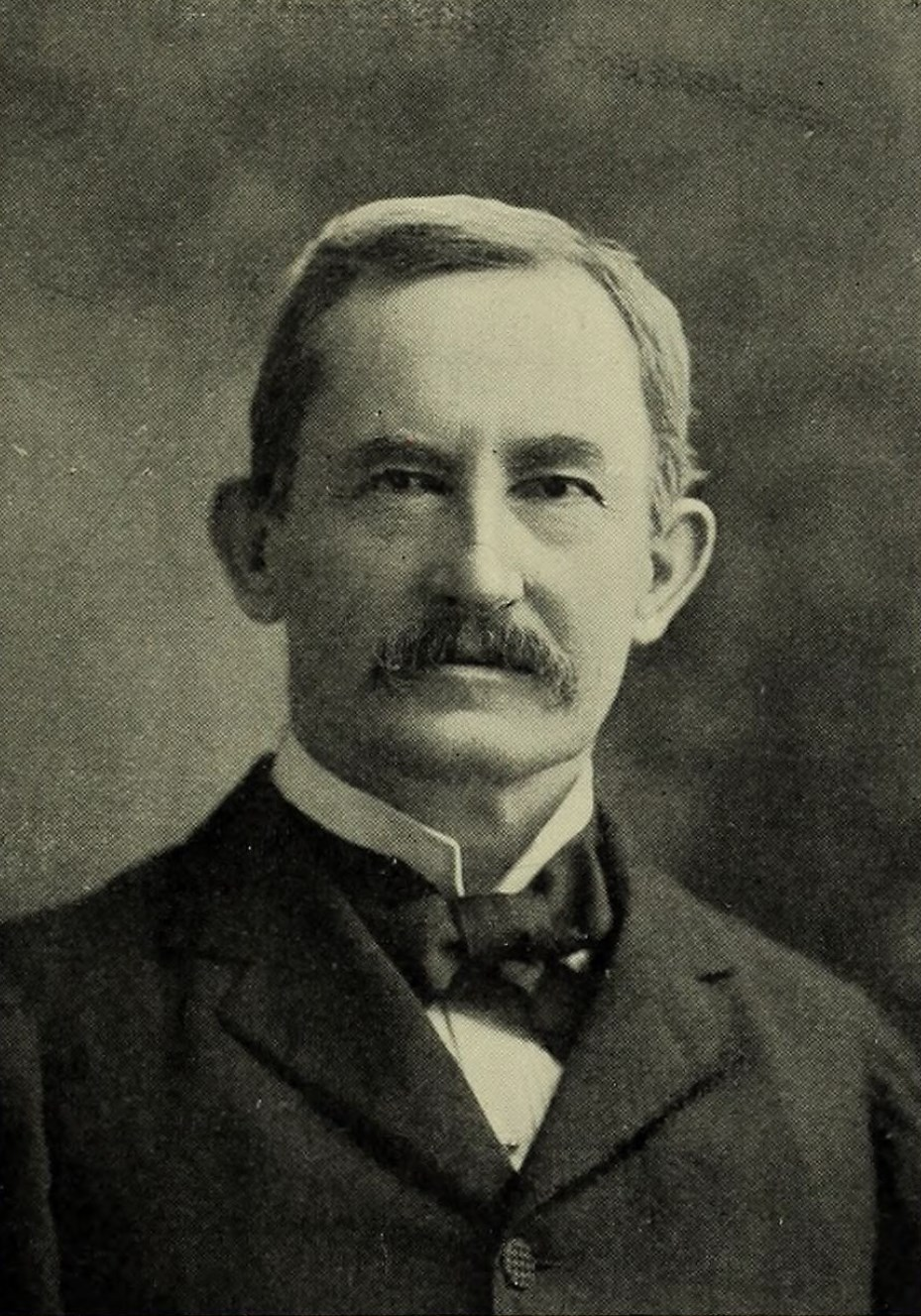

Member of the Georgia House of Representatives
- In office 1884–1889

Personal details
- Born: October 14, 1834 Savannah, Georgia, U.S.
- Died: September 11, 1912 (aged 77) White Sulphur Springs, West Virginia, U.S.
- Resting place: Laurel Grove Cemetery
- Spouse: Nellie Kinzie Gordon (m. 1857–1912)
- Children: 6, including Juliette Gordon Low and William Washington Gordon III
- Parent: William Washington Gordon (father)
- Education: Yale University
- Occupation: Military officer, politician

William Washington Gordon II (also known as William Washington Gordon Jr.; October 14, 1834 – September 11, 1912) was a Confederate captain in the American Civil War, later serving as a brigadier general in the United States Army during the Spanish–American War.

== Early life ==
William Washington Gordon II, later nicknamed Willie, was born in Savannah, Georgia, in 1834 as the eldest son of Senator William Washington Gordon of Georgia. He graduated B.A. from Yale University in 1854, before returning to Savannah to become a cotton and rice broker, forming the firm of Tison & Gordon in 1856.

== Career ==
Commissioned into the Georgia Hussars as a lieutenant at the outset of the American Civil War in 1861, Gordon fought with distinction being promoted captain and then adjutant, receiving his only wound at Lovejoy's Station after the Battle of Jonesboro (1864).

Gordon then returned to his family's cotton plantation, becoming chairman of the Savannah Cotton Exchange and vice-president of the Merchants' National Bank, as well as a founding director of the Georgia Railroad and Banking Company. He was elected to the Georgia Assembly 1884–89 and served as commanding officer of the State Militia, being appointed in 1891 a brigadier general of the US Army.

== Personal life ==
In 1857, Gordon married Eleanor Lytle Kinzie, younger daughter of Colonel John Harris Kinzie. They had six children: William Washington Gordon III (1866–1932), George Arthur Gordon (1872–1947), Eleanor Kinzie Gordon (1858–1933), Juliette Magill Kinzie Gordon (1860–1927), Sarah Alice Gordon (1863–1880) and Mabel McLane Gordon (1870–1951).

Eleanor married Congressman Richard Wayne Parker; Juliette founded the Girl Scouts of the USA; and Mabel married Hon Rowland Leigh (1859–1943), having two children: author Jane Gordon and screenwriter Rowland Leigh.

== Death ==
Gordon died in White Sulphur Springs, West Virginia, in 1912, aged 77. He was interred at Laurel Grove Cemetery in Savannah. His widow survived him by five years, and was buried beside him upon her death, aged 81.
