= Eleanor Lytle McKillip Kinzie =

Eleanor Kinzie (née Lytle, later McKillip; fl. 1800) was the wife of John Kinzie, mother of John H. Kinzie, and great-grandmother of Juliette Gordon Low. At the age of nine, Eleanor Lytle was captured by Native Americans in a raid on her father's house near Pittsburgh. She was a captive of a Seneca tribe for four years and was adopted into the family of Chief Cornplanter. He released her and her family moved to Detroit. At the age of 14, she was married to Captain McKillip, a British officer. They had a daughter named Margaret. He was later killed in 1794 by friendly fire at the future location of Fort Defiance at the Miami Rapids.

A play called The Captivity of Eleanor Lytle was presented in the children's theater of the 1933 Chicago World's Fair.
