= William Washington Gordon =

American politician

- Born: June 17, 1796; Screven County, Georgia, U.S.
- Died: March 22, 1842 (aged 45); Savannah, Georgia, U.S.
- Burial place: Laurel Grove Cemetery, Savannah, Georgia, U.S.
- Occupations: politician and busienssman
- Children: 3, including William Washington Gordon II

William Washington Gordon (June 17, 1796 – March 22, 1842) was an American politician and businessman. In 1815, he became the first person from Georgia to graduate from the United States Military Academy. He also served as mayor of Savannah, Georgia, and was later elected to the Georgia Senate.

== Early life ==
Gordon was born in 1796 in Screven County, Georgia, to Captain Ambrose Gordon and Elizabeth Mead. He was named for American Revolutionary War General William Washington under whom Gordon's father had served under as a cavalry lieutenant. Gordon was his parents' third child of four: following Margaret and Elizabeth and before Mississippi. His father died, on his 53rd birthday, not long after Gordon turned eight.

Upon the death of his father, in 1804, Gordon was sent to school in Rhode Island and then attended the United States Military Academy. He graduated from that institution in 1815 and was the first person from Georgia to do so. He remained in the army for half a year, serving as an aide-de-camp to Edmund P. Gaines. He then returned to Savannah, Georgia, to study law under James Moore Wayne.

== Career ==
Gordon became a member of the state bar in 1820 and served in several local public positions. In 1834, Gordon was elected as the mayor of Savannah and served in that position until 1836. During his mayoral service, he was elected to the Georgia General Assembly as a member of the House of Representatives in 1835. In 1838, the year his mother died, Gordon was elected to the Georgia Senate.

He founded and served as the first president of the Central Railroad and Banking Company of Georgia, which would later be reorganized as the Central of Georgia Railway. Today, the Central of Georgia lines are a component of the Norfolk Southern Railway.

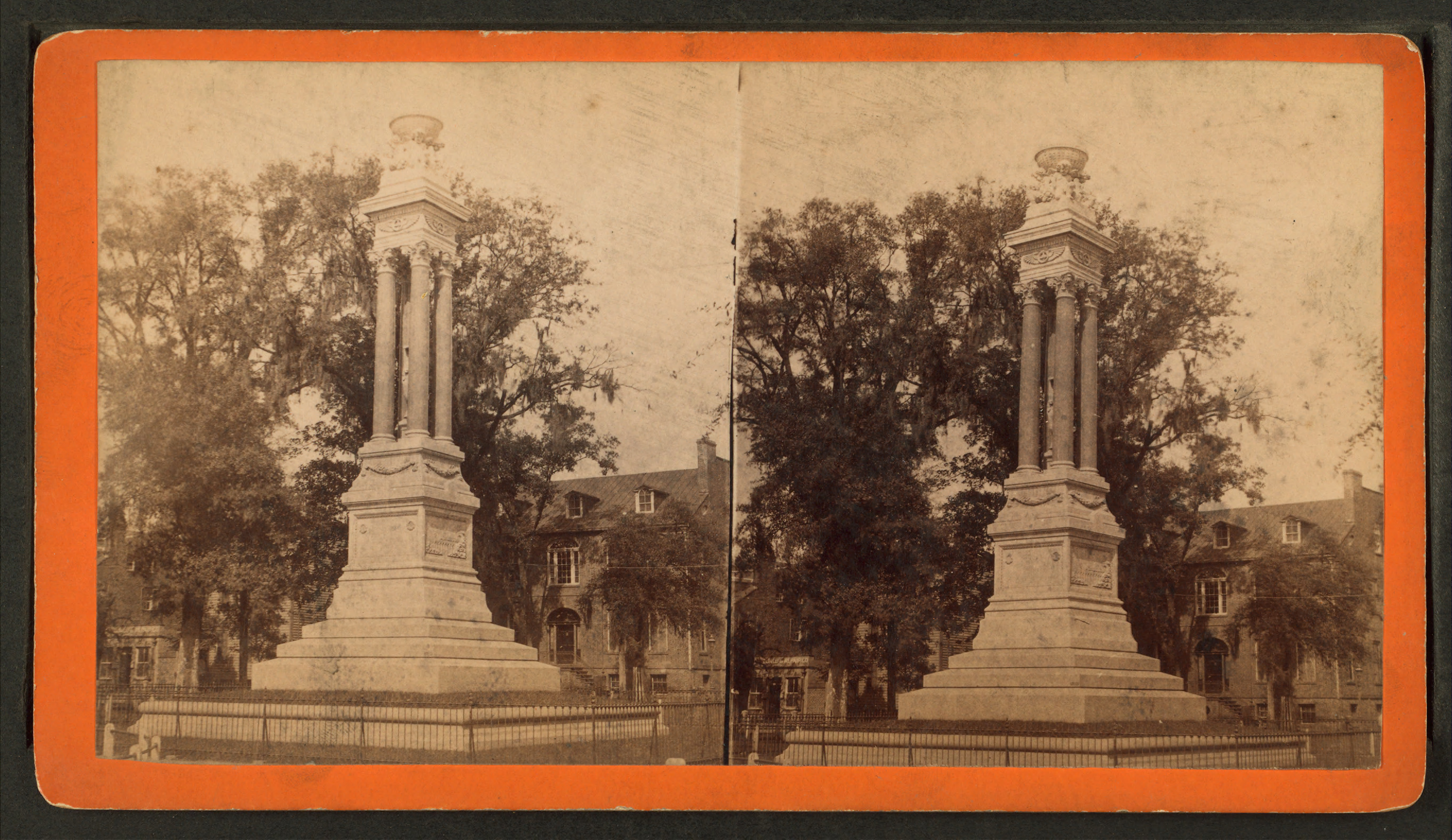
William Washington Gordon Monument

On June 25, 1882, the Central of Georgia Railroad and Banking Company constructed the William Washington Gordon Monument in Savannah's Wright Square. To do so they destroyed the grave of Indian Chief Tomochichi who had given General Oglethorpe the land on which to found the city of Savannah. Gordon's daughter-in-law, Nellie Kinzie Gordon, was outraged at this perceived insult to Tomochichi thus she and other members of the Colonial Dames of the State of Georgia erected a new monument to Tomochichi, made of granite from Stone Mountain, and located in the southwest corner of the square. Gordon, Georgia, and Gordon County, Georgia, are both named after Gordon.

== Personal life ==
Gordon married Wayne's niece, Sarah Anderson "Addy" Stites, in 1826 and purchased Wayne's Savannah home, at 10 East Oglethorpe Avenue, in 1830. The couple had three children: George, William Jr. and Eliza. Washington's granddaughter, Juliette Gordon Low—founder of the Girl Scouts of the USA—was born and raised in the house.

== Death ==
Gordon died in Savannah in 1842, aged 45, from bilious pleurisy and was originally buried in the city's Colonial Park Cemetery but his remains were later moved to Laurel Grove Cemetery. His widow survived him by forty years and was interred alongside him.

Political offices
Preceded by William Thorne Williams	Mayor of Savannah; 1834–1836	Succeeded by William Cuyler
