= Walt Kinzie =

American baseball player (1858–1909)

- Shortstop
- Born: March 16, 1857; Burlington, Kansas
- Died: November 5, 1909 (aged 52); Chicago, Illinois, U.S.
- Batted: Right Threw: Right

MLB debut
- July 17, 1882, for the Detroit Wolverines

Last MLB appearance
- September 9, 1884, for the St. Louis Browns

MLB statistics
- Batting average: .132
- Home runs: 2
- Runs batted in: 10
- Stats at Baseball Reference

Teams
- Detroit Wolverines (1882); Chicago White Stockings (1884); St. Louis Browns (1884)

Walter Harris Kinzie (March 16, 1858 – November 5, 1909) was an American professional baseball player who played shortstop in 1882 for the Detroit Wolverines and in 1884 for the Chicago White Stockings and St. Louis Browns.

Kinzie was the grandson of Chicago pioneer John Kinzie and United States Army officer William Whistler. He worked as a weighmaster in the Union Stock Yards for twenty years until his death in 1909.
