= Antoine Ouilmette =

Early resident of present-day Chicago, Illinois

Antoine Ouilmette (c. 1760–1841) was a fur trader and early resident of what is now Chicago, Illinois. He was of French Canadian and possibly Native American ancestry. He also married into a Métis family. The village of Wilmette, Illinois (phonetic spelling of Ouilmette) is named in his honor.

== Early and family life ==
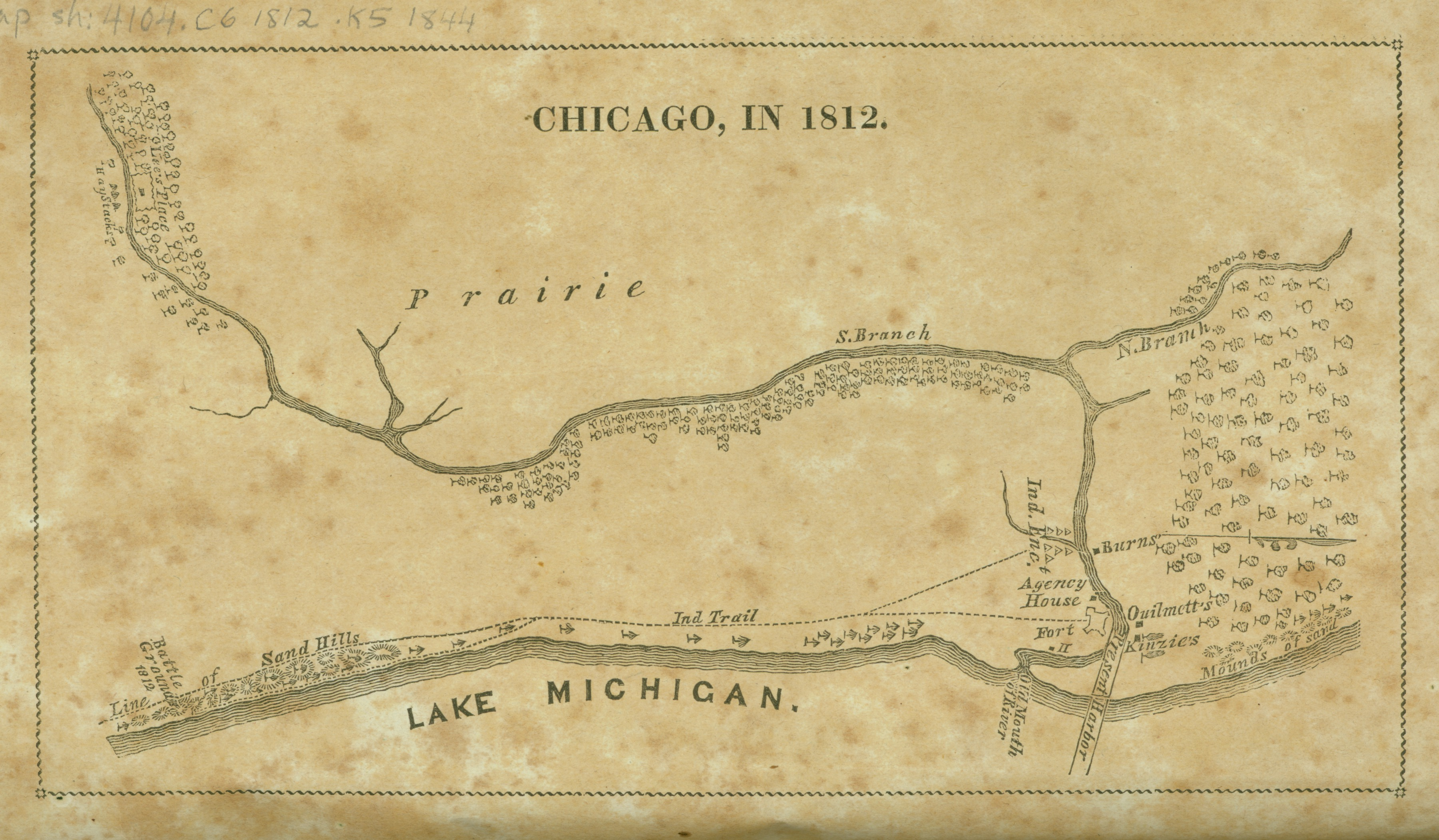
Retrospective map showing how Chicago may have appeared in 1812. Ouilmette's home is shown close to the mouth of the Chicago River (right is north)

Little is known about Ouilmette's background and early life. In 1908, amateur historian Frank Grover wrote that previous claims that Ouilmette was an "Indian chief" were false, and that he was instead a white voyageur of French Canadian ancestry. However, "Ouilamette" was a name associated with the Potawatomi tribe decades before Antoine Ouilmette's birth, and so in 1977 anthropologist James A. Clifton speculated that Antoine Ouilmette was "probably a Métis descendant" of Ouilamette, a Native American who was prominent in the Lake Michigan region beginning in the 1680s. Grover wrote that Ouilmette was born in Lahndrayh, near Montréal, in 1760. Another source says that he was baptized as "Antoine Louis Ouimet", on December 26, 1758, in the parish of Sainte-Rose northwest of Montréal, in what is now the city of Laval, Québec. He was the second son of Louis Ouimet dit Albert and Louise Desjardins dit Charbonnier. It is not known why and when Antoine's family name changed to Ouilmette; also referred to as Ouilmet, Houillamette, Willamette, Wilmette, Wilmot, Wemet.

In 1796 or 1797 he married Archange Marie Chevalier, a French-Potawatomi woman, at Gross Pointe, a site along the southwestern shore of Lake Michigan. Her grandfather, Naunongee, was a Potowatomi chief of the Three Fires Confederacy. Her sisters likewise married traders—Sheshi Chevalier married Louis Buisson who traded and farmed near what became Peoria, Illinois, Josette Chevalier married Jean Baptiste Beaubien and Catherine Chevalier married Alexander Robinson who learned the fur trade from Joseph Bailly at St. Joseph, Michigan, alongside Beaubien and would later settle on the south branch of the Chicago River.

Antoine and Archange had eight children, four boys and four girls: Joseph, Louis, François, Michael (aka Michell), Elizabeth, Archange, Josette, and Sophia, as well as an adopted daughter, Archange Trombola.

== Career ==
Ouilmette moved to Chicago in July 1790 where he built a log cabin on the north side of the main branch of the Chicago River, just to the west of the property of Jean Baptiste Point du Sable and across the river from the future site of Fort Dearborn. After John Kinzie settled in Chicago in 1804, Ouilmette became Kinzie's employee, and later established his own trading post at Gross Pointe. He later worked for the American Fur Company.

Because Archange was Potawatomi, Ouilmette's family did not flee their home during the Battle of Fort Dearborn in 1812, although her father died in the battle. After the battle, the Ouilmettes hid Margaret Helm, the wife of a lieutenant (and daughter of former Indian Agent William Wells, and Sergeant William Griffith at their house, protecting them from the Potowatomi that attacked Fort Dearborn.

Ouilmette and his Métis family were friendly with most of the local Native American population, so they remained in Chicago in the four years that followed the Battle of Fort Dearborn. During this time, Antoine was the area's only white resident .

In addition to fur trading Ouilmette also worked as a farmer (supplying Fort Dearborn with livestock and cordwood). However, his income predominantly came from his work as a guide transporting people and goods across the Chicago Portage.

Ouilmette was a "progressive, energetic man of good business ability for those times, he accumulated considerable property. He had a store in Chicago, and also a fine lot of horses, cattle, sheep and hogs. He also had a farm at Racine, Wisconsin, which he frequently visited while living in Chicago. He also made occasional business trips to Milwaukee and Canada." Ouilmette was "known as a kind, whole souled, generous man of remarkable energy and perseverance, who made friends with everybody, both Indians and whites, and he in turn was universally liked and respected."

In 1829 Antoine Ouilmette was instrumental in persuading local Native Americans to sign the second Treaty of Prairie du Chien. On July 29, 1829, as a condition of that treaty with the U.S., the government awarded 1,280 acres (5.2 km^{2}) of land in present-day Wilmette and Evanston to Ouilmette's wife Archange, fulfilling a condition of a treaty with the Ojibwe, Odawa and Pottawatomie tribes. Elijah M. Haines claimed that the land was given to Ouilmette's wife and children as a reward for Ouilmette's influence in securing the execution of the treaty.

Shortly after this Ouilmette and his family moved to a cabin on this reservation. Ouilmette was also involved with the 1833 Treaty of Chicago negotiations. This treaty not only provided provisions for Chief Robinson and Billy Caldwell, Ouilmette's children, and others but it secured $800 for Ouilmette. Like Alexander Robinson, Billy Caldwell, and several of the Beaubiens, Ouilmette was Roman Catholic. In April 1833, he and they (and others), petitioned the Bishop of the diocese of Missouri, located in St. Louis, asking for permission to establish the first Catholic church in Chicago. Received on 16 April, the petition was granted the next day.

In the late 1830s Ouilmette accused Joseph Fountain of Evanston and others of trespassing and illegally harvesting timber from the Ouilmette family's reservation. Ouilmette lost the suit and paid a large bill in court costs. Fountain's lawyer sent the sheriff to confiscate and sell two "fine Indian ponies" belonging to Ouilmette, "which were his special pride." Shortly after this, the Ouilmette family decided to leave. In 1838, the Ouilmette family moved to Council Bluffs, where many Potawatomi had previously relocated. He died at Council Bluffs, Iowa, on 1 December 1841.
