= Shabonee (YTB-833) =

Tugboat of the United States Navy

History

United States
- Awarded: 5 June 1973
- Builder: Marinette Marine, Marinette, Wisconsin
- Laid down: 12 June 1974
- Launched: 29 October 1974
- In service: 16 December 1974
- Stricken: 16 February 2002
- Identification: IMO number: 8980907; MMSI number: 367690450; Callsign: WDI3646
- Fate: Sold into commercial service

General characteristics
- Class & type: Natick-class large harbor tug
- Displacement: 286 long tons (291 t) (light); 346 long tons (352 t) (full)
- Length: 108 ft (33 m)
- Beam: 31 ft (9.4 m)
- Draft: 14 ft (4.3 m)
- Speed: 12 knots (14 mph; 22 km/h)
- Complement: 12
- Armament: None

Shabonee (YTB-833), sometimes spelled Shabonne, was a United States Navy Natick-class large harbor tug named for Pottawatomie Chief Shabonna, grand nephew of Chief Pontiac. Shabonee was the second US Navy ship to bear the name.

== Construction ==
The contract for Shabonee was awarded 5 June 1973. She was laid down on 12 June 1974 at Marinette, Wisconsin, by Marinette Marine and launched 29 October 1974.

== Operational history ==
Shabonee served at Naval Station Mayport, Florida. Stricken from the Navy List 16 February 2002, ex-Shabonee was sold to McAllister Towing and renamed Daniel McAllister. Blew an engine icebreaking in the Port of Duluth. Scrapped in the summer of 2019.
