= Sauganash Hotel =

First hotel in Chicago

Coordinates: 41°53′7.3″N 87°38′11.2″W

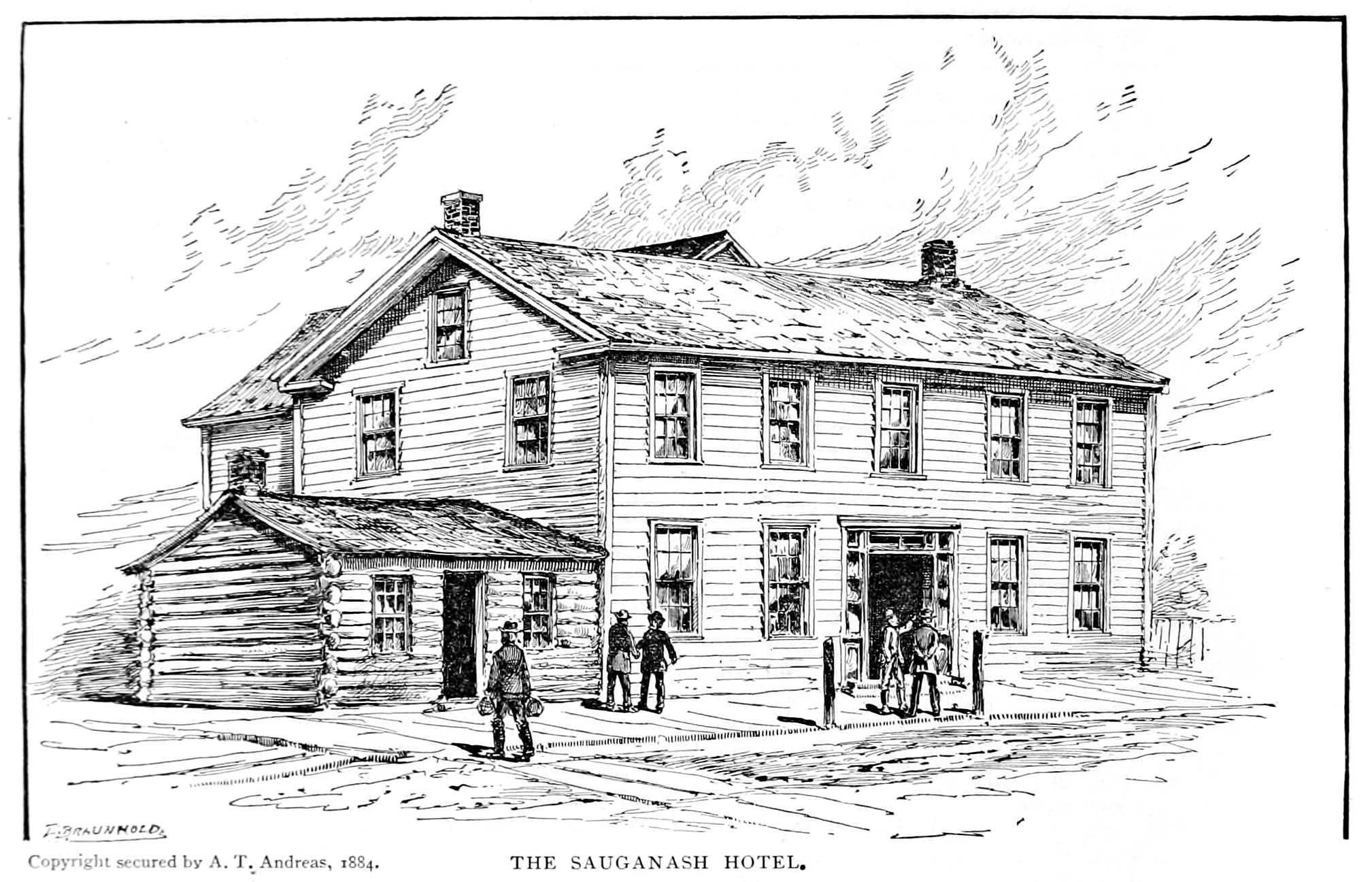
- Sauganash Hotel, c. 1830–33 (the smaller building on the left was Chicago's first drug store)
- Interactive map of the Sauganash Hotel area

General information
- Completed: 1831; 195 years ago
- Closed: 1851; 175 years ago

Technical details
- Floor count: 2

Sauganash Hotel (originally Eagle Exchange Tavern) was a hotel regarded as the first hotel in Chicago, Illinois. Built in 1831, the hotel was located at Wolf Point in the present-day Loop community area at the intersection of the north, south and main branches of the Chicago River. The location at West Lake Street and North Wacker Drive (formerly Market Street) was designated a Chicago Landmark on November 6, 2002. The hotel changed proprietors often in its twenty-year existence and its dining hall area briefly served as Chicago's first commercial theater. It was named after Billy Caldwell, called Sauganash meaning Englishman, a captain in the British Indian Department and son of William Caldwell.

== History ==
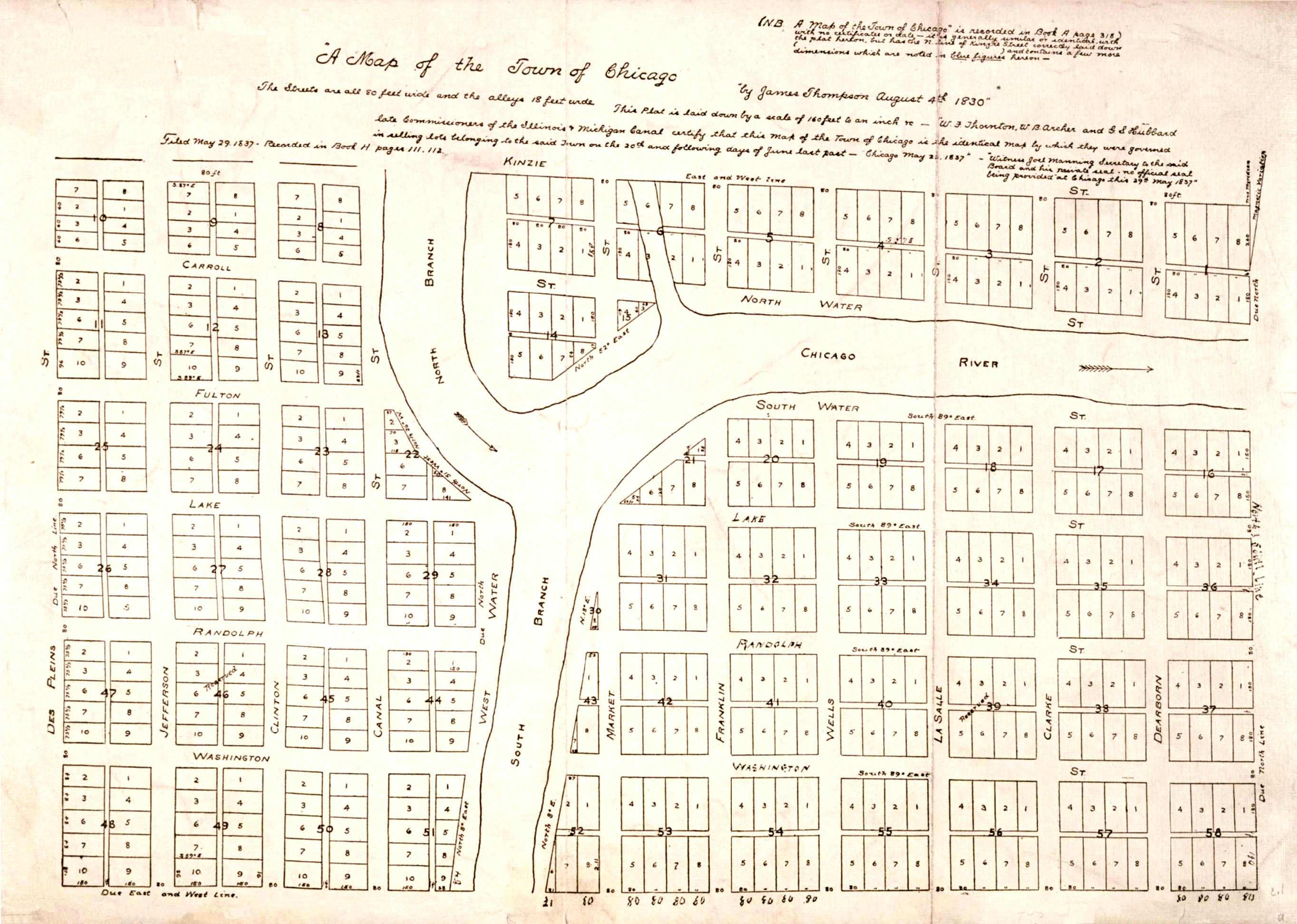
Thompson's original 1830 58-block plat of Chicago showing the intersection of the branches of the Chicago River

Mark and Monique Beaubien, the owners and builders of the hotel, were French Indian traders. In 1826 they moved to Chicago on the advice of Mark's elder brother Jean, an established trader who lived next to Fort Dearborn. The Beaubiens settled in a small cabin on Wolf's Point and also traded with the Native Americans and other travelers to the growing settlement. They built a tavern on the east bank of the south branch of the Chicago River at the point where the north and south branches meet.

The tavern initially was named the Eagle Exchange Tavern. In 1831, they added a frame to the log structure to create Chicago's first hotel, the Sauganash Hotel. When completed, it was one of only two residential structures on the south side of the main branch of the Chicago River, the other being that of his brother, Col. Jean B. Beaubien. The settlement had only twelve houses at the time. The hostelry immediately became famous, and when reconstructed later became the city's largest and finest hotel. Immediately adjacent to the hotel's public bar was Chicago's first drug store. The Greek Revival trim of the new hotel contrasted with the other eleven buildings of Chicago. The symmetry of its facade was typical to contemporary Greek Revival practiced on the East Coast. Juliette Kinzie, who came to Chicago from Connecticut in 1831, described it as "a pretentious white two-story building, with bright blue wood shutters, the admiration of all the little circle at Wolf Point". The hostelry's clientele transcended race, with natives and settlers enjoying each other's company.

The flow of travelers and settlers intensified with the end of the Black Hawk War in 1832. In 1833 the hotel housed the election of the first town trustees of the newly formed Town of Chicago. Beaubien kept the hotel until 1834 and during his ownership he regularly entertained guests with his violin. On August 18, 1835, two years after the Potawatomi natives signed the treaty agreeing to be moved to a reservation beyond the Mississippi River in northwestern Missouri, they selected 800 braves to perform their last war dance parade on a path that passed in front of the hotel.

In 1835, a Mr. Davis assumed control of the hotel, which subsequently had a series of proprietors. The building briefly served as Chicago's first theater, and hosted the first Chicago Theatre Company in November 1837 in an abandoned dining room. By 1839, it returned to service as a hotel, but was destroyed by fire in 1851, and subsequently torn down. The Wigwam was built in its place nine years later.

== Honoree ==
Billy Caldwell "Sauganash", who served as a captain in the British Indian Department, was the honoree of the hotel. Born in 1782, Billy's father was Colonel Caldwell, an Irish officer in the British Army stationed at Niagara; his mother was a Mohawk, daughter of a chief named Rising Sun. He was brought to Detroit as a youth and raised by his father and step-mother. Caldwell was called naturally smart and by consequence of his education became fluent in French, English, and Mohawk. He later forgot Mohawk through disuse and it was replaced with Potawatomi. As a captain in the British Indian Department, Billy fought alongside Tecumseh until he died at the Battle of the Thames.

== Theater ==
In 1834 (three years before Chicago was incorporated as a city), the hotel hosted the first professional public performance in Chicago for $.50 (equivalent to $16.13 in 2025) for adults and $.25 (equivalent to $8.06 in 2025) for children. The show promised a wide variety of talents including ventriloquism. In the following two years, several traveling showmen performed at the hotel. In 1837, the Chicago Theater, which was the first local theater company, set up shop in the hotel's abandoned dining room. Co-managers Harry Isherwood and Alexander McKinzie procured an amusement license for the company from the city council, and it began performing a different billed show every night starting in late October or early November for approximately six weeks. The plays included titles The Idiot Witness, The Stranger, and The Carpenter of Rouen. Production of The Stranger took place in the dining room of the hotel. Following a six-week engagement, the company went on tour until the following spring, when it returned to a different local venue.
