= Wigwam (Chicago) =

Convention center in Chicago (demolished)

Coordinates: 41°53′7.3″N 87°38′11.2″W

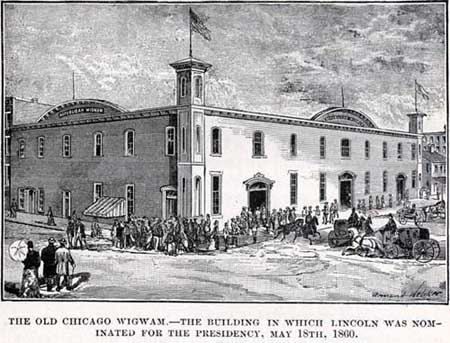
The Wigwam - 1860 Republican National Convention, where Abraham Lincoln was nominated

The Wigwam was a convention center and meeting hall built to hold the 1860 Republican National Convention. It was located in Chicago, Illinois, at Lake Street and Market (later Wacker Drive) near where the Chicago River divides into its north and south branches, on property owned by Garrett Theological Seminary. This site had previously been the site of the Sauganash Hotel, Chicago's first hotel. This is where Abraham Lincoln won the party's nomination, which led to the U.S. Presidency. The name "Wigwam" was later associated with host locations for both the 1864 Democratic National Convention and the 1892 Democratic National Convention in Chicago.

The location at Lake and Wacker was designated a Chicago Landmark on November 6, 2002.

== The building ==
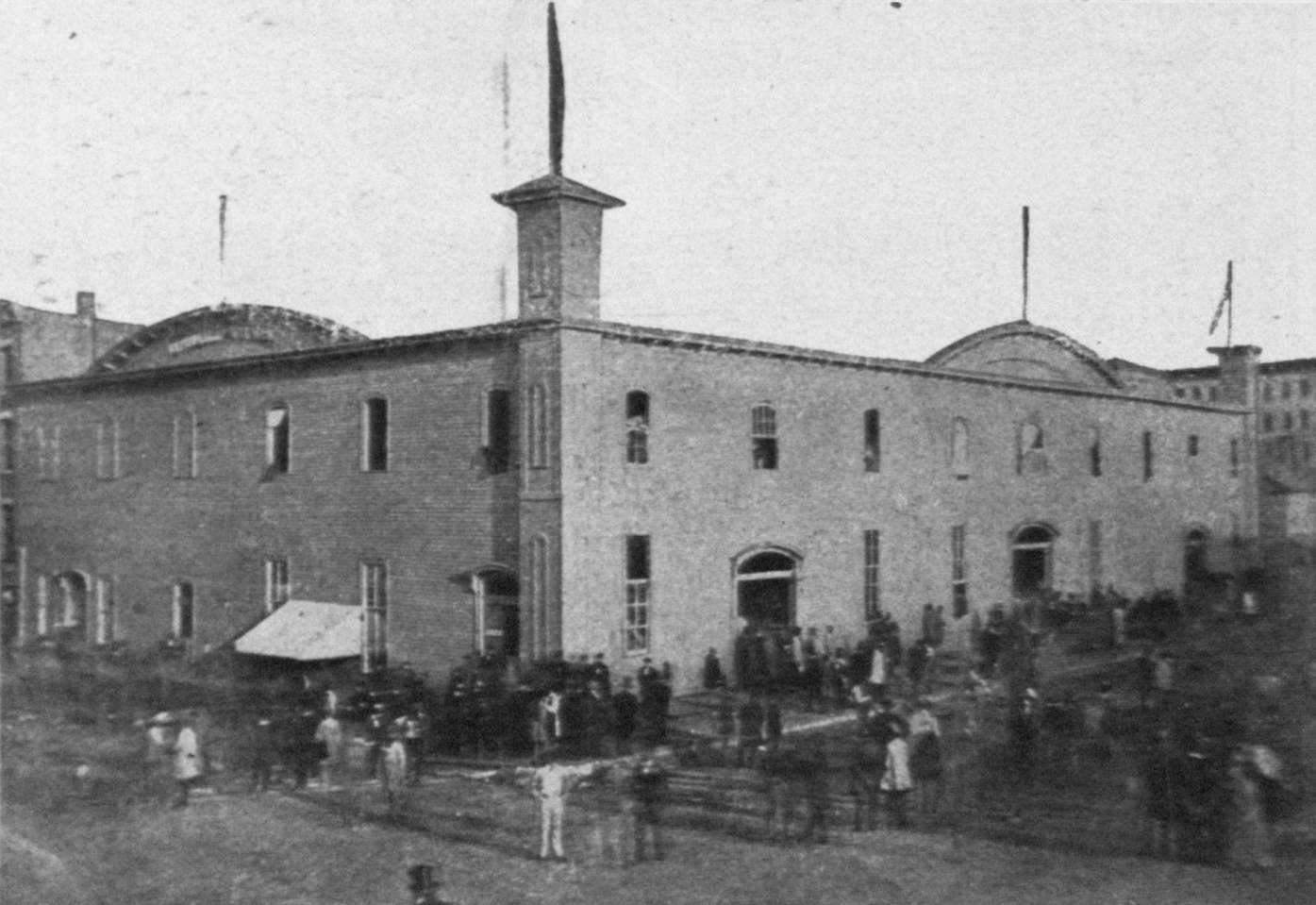
Photograph of the building by Alexander Hessler, date unknown

The two-story Wigwam was built by Chicago business leaders to attract the 1860 Convention. It was a temporary structure, built entirely of wood in little more than a month, and could accommodate 10–12,000 people. The building was used for political and patriotic meetings during the Convention and the American Civil War. It also served as a retail space until its demolition. The Wigwam was destroyed by fire on November 13, 1869.

Following the Great Chicago Fire of 1871, another "Wigwam" building at Washington (one city block south of Lake) and Market served as the temporary home of the Chicago Board of Trade.

It was an antebellum custom to call a political campaign headquarters a "Wigwam", derived from wigwam, a Native American word – specifically in the Eastern Abenaki language – for "temporary shelter".

== History ==
=== Sauganash Hotel ===
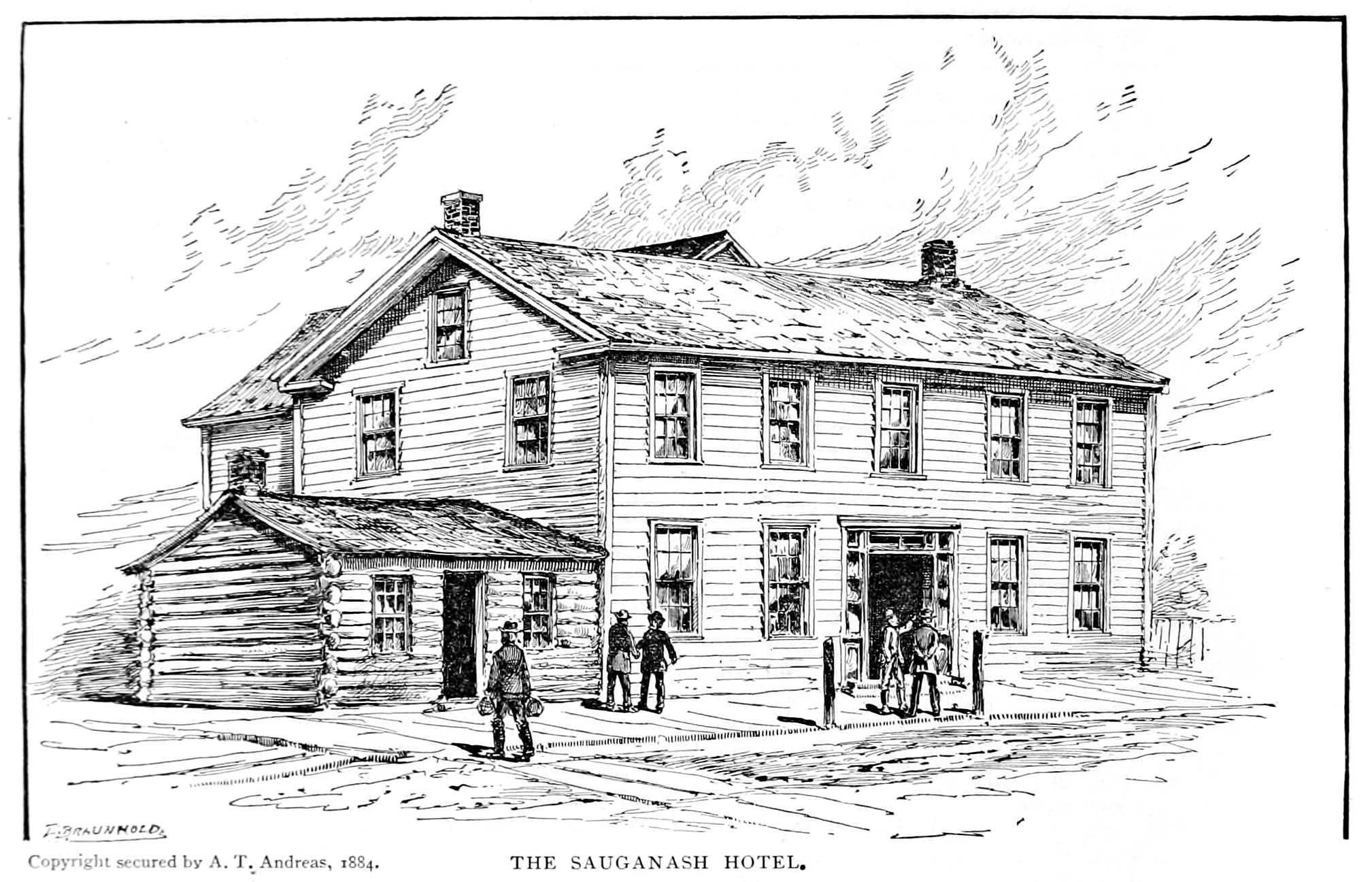
The Sauganash Hotel

Mark Beaubien built a tavern on the site of the later Wigwam in 1829–30. In 1831, he added a frame to the log structure to create Chicago's first hotel, the Sauganash Hotel, on the east bank of the south branch of the Chicago River at the point where the north and south branches meet. The newly formed Town of Chicago elected its first town trustees in 1833 in the hotel. The building briefly served as Chicago's first theater, and it hosted the first Chicago Theatre company in 1837 in an abandoned dining room. The hotel was destroyed by fire in 1851, and the Wigwam was built in its place nine years later.

=== Conventions and later "Wigwams" ===
Chicago has hosted the most United States presidential nominating conventions (14 Republican National Conventions and 11 Democratic National Conventions, in addition to one notable Progressive Party assembly). The 1860 Republican National Convention (the second Republican National Convention) was held at the Wigwam. The 1864 Democratic National Convention was hosted in a different "Wigwam" built for the convention as a semicircular roofed amphitheater. These were the first Chicago visits for each party's national convention. Baltimore has hosted 10 and Philadelphia has hosted 9. The 1868 Republican National Convention returned to Chicago, but it was located at the Crosby Opera House. The 1892 Democratic National Convention convened in a temporary "Wigwam" in Lake Park for Grover Cleveland's third nomination.

==== 1860 Republican National Convention ====
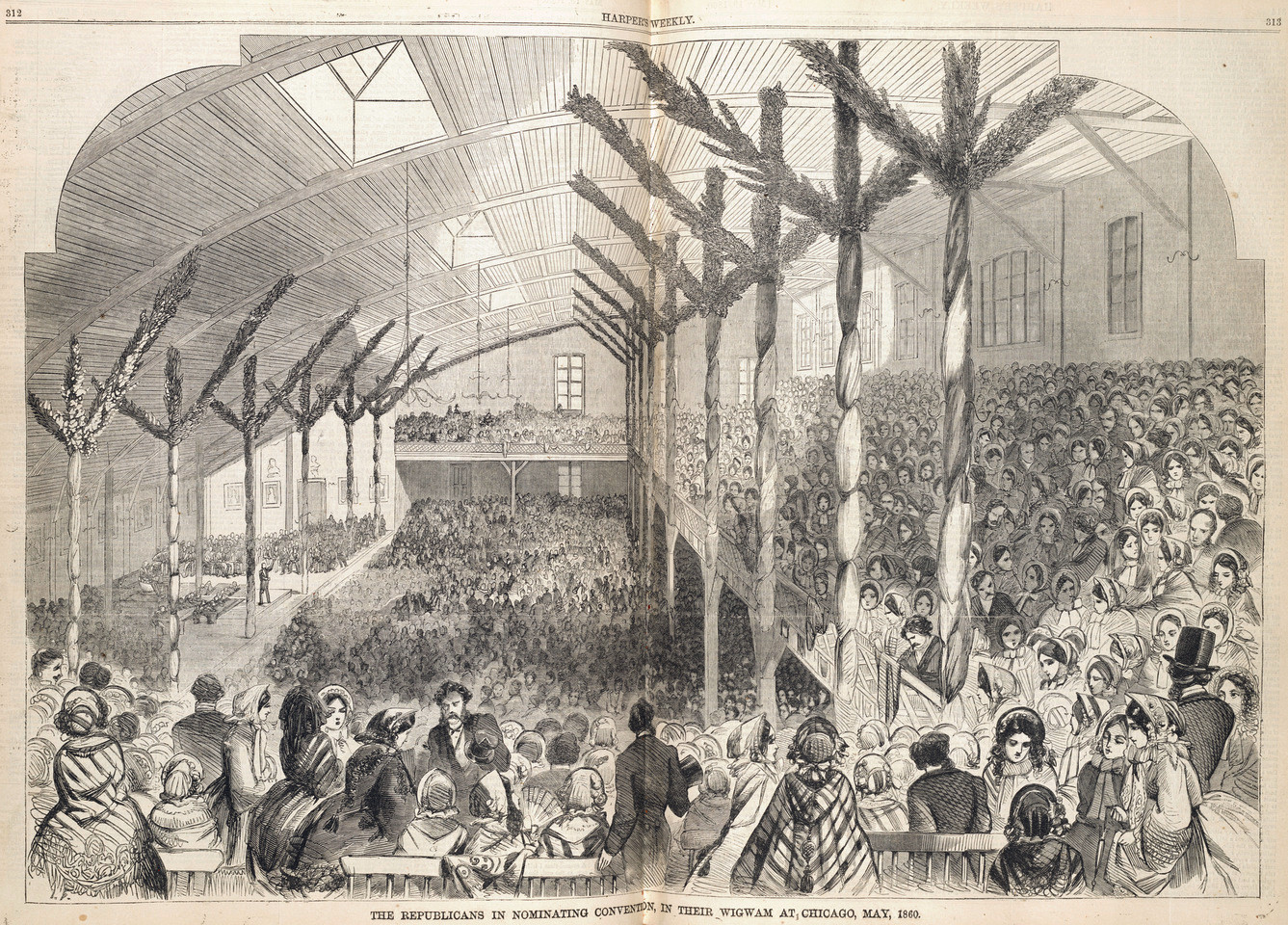
Drawing of the Wigwam interior during the 1860 nominating convention. Note the second story gallery and curved ceiling structure to allow for better acoustics.

The 1860 Republican National Convention was notable for its nomination of Abraham Lincoln, who went on to a Presidency notably marked by the onset of the American Civil War and the abolition of slavery. During the convention, backroom dealing and political scheming played a role in the outcome. Nevertheless, Lincoln, who had stayed in Springfield during the convention, received vociferous support and carried the nomination.

=== Today ===
Today, the corner of W. Lake Street and N. Wacker Drive bears the address of 191 North Wacker. This address is in the Loop community area in Chicago. The 157 m (516 ft), 37-story office tower, named 191 North Wacker, was designed by Kohn Pedersen Fox and built in 2002. The major tenants include Drinker, Biddle & Reath, Much Shelist, Watson Wyatt Worldwide, Heitman Financial, and RSM McGladrey. In 2017, the city rededicated plaques gifted in the early 20th century by the Daughters of the American Revolution, which commemorate the nomination of Lincoln at the Wigwam, and the Saganaush Hotel.

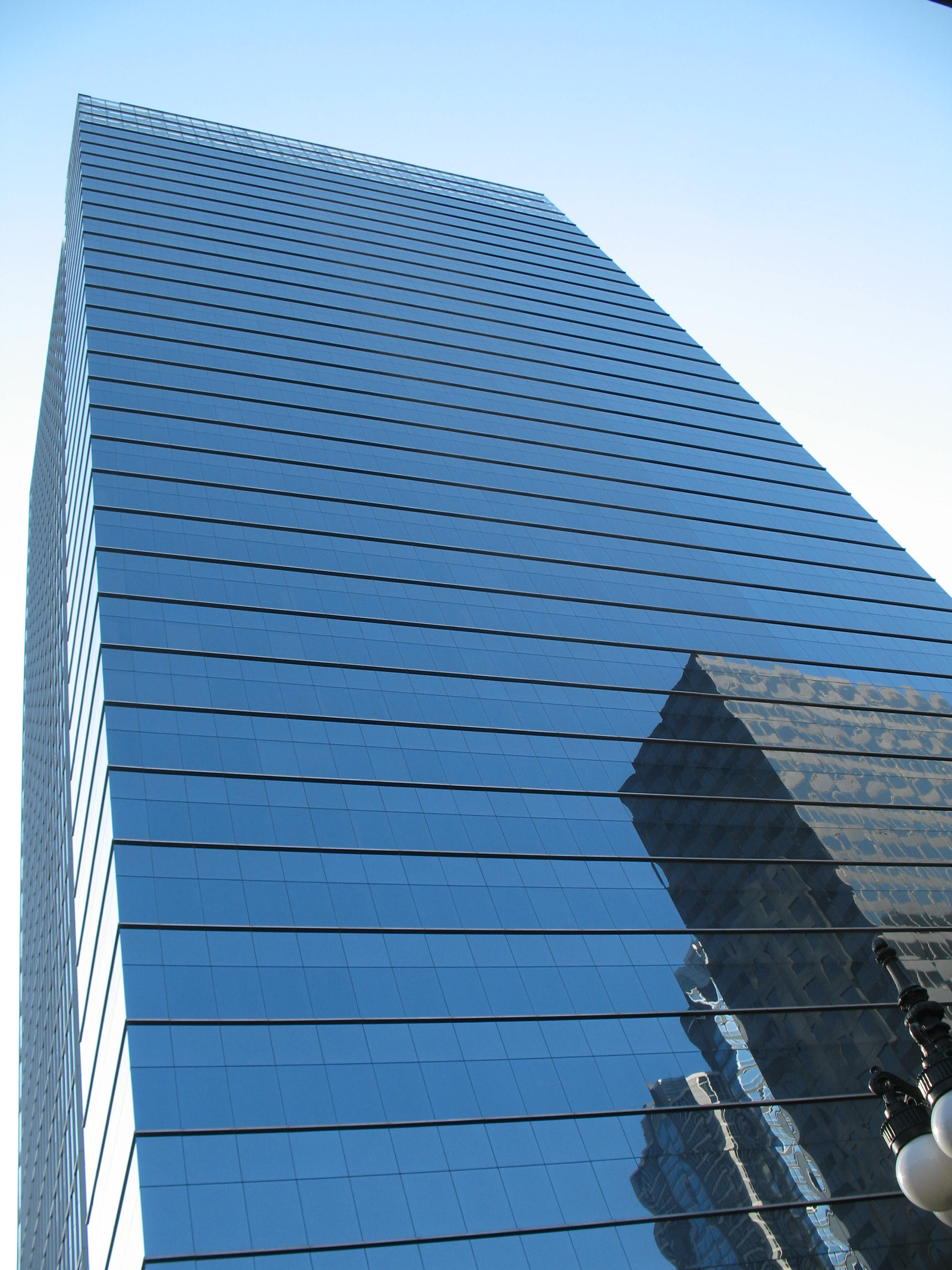
191 N. Wacker

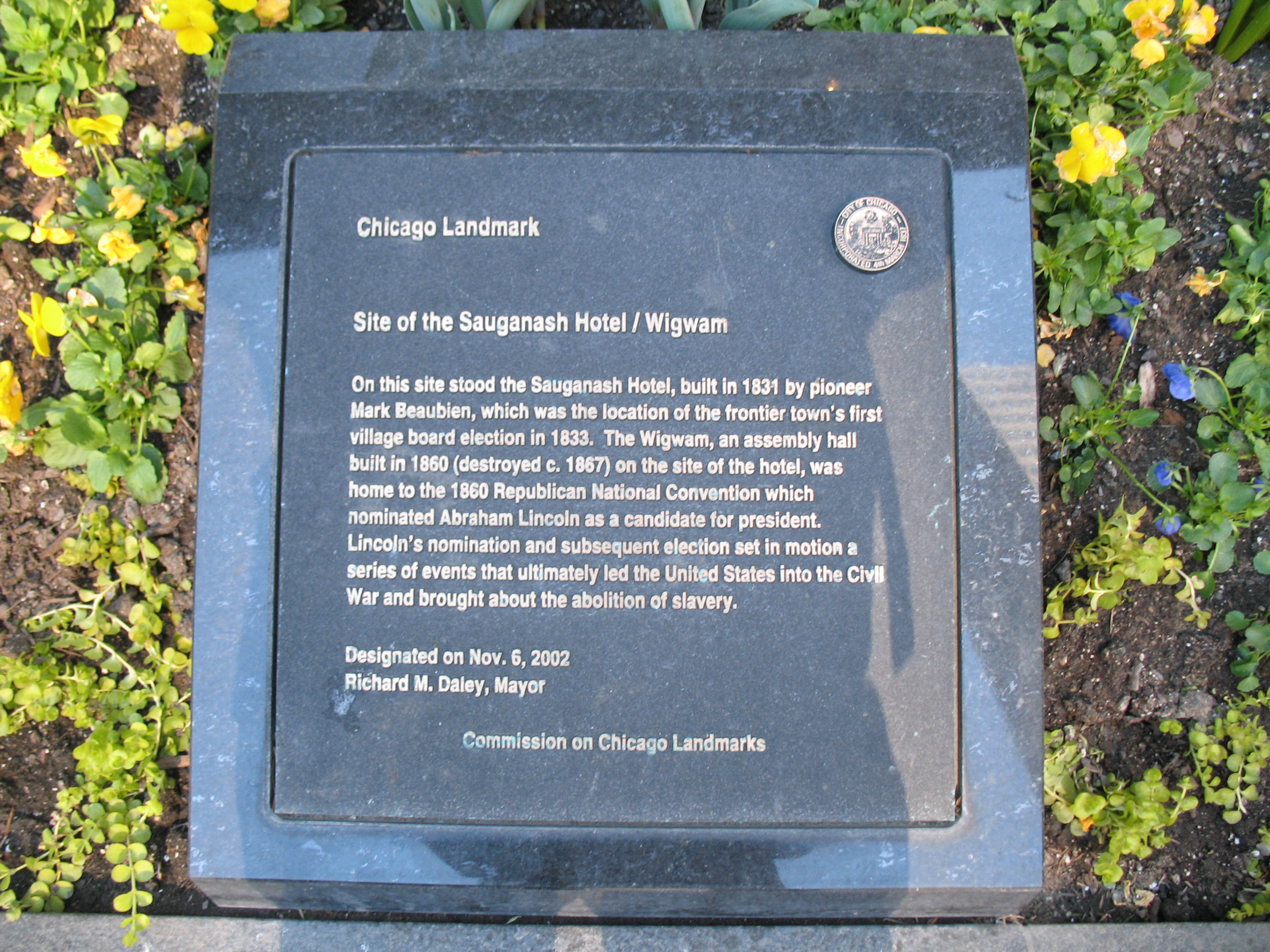
Wigwam Building/Sauganash Hotel Chicago Landmark plaque

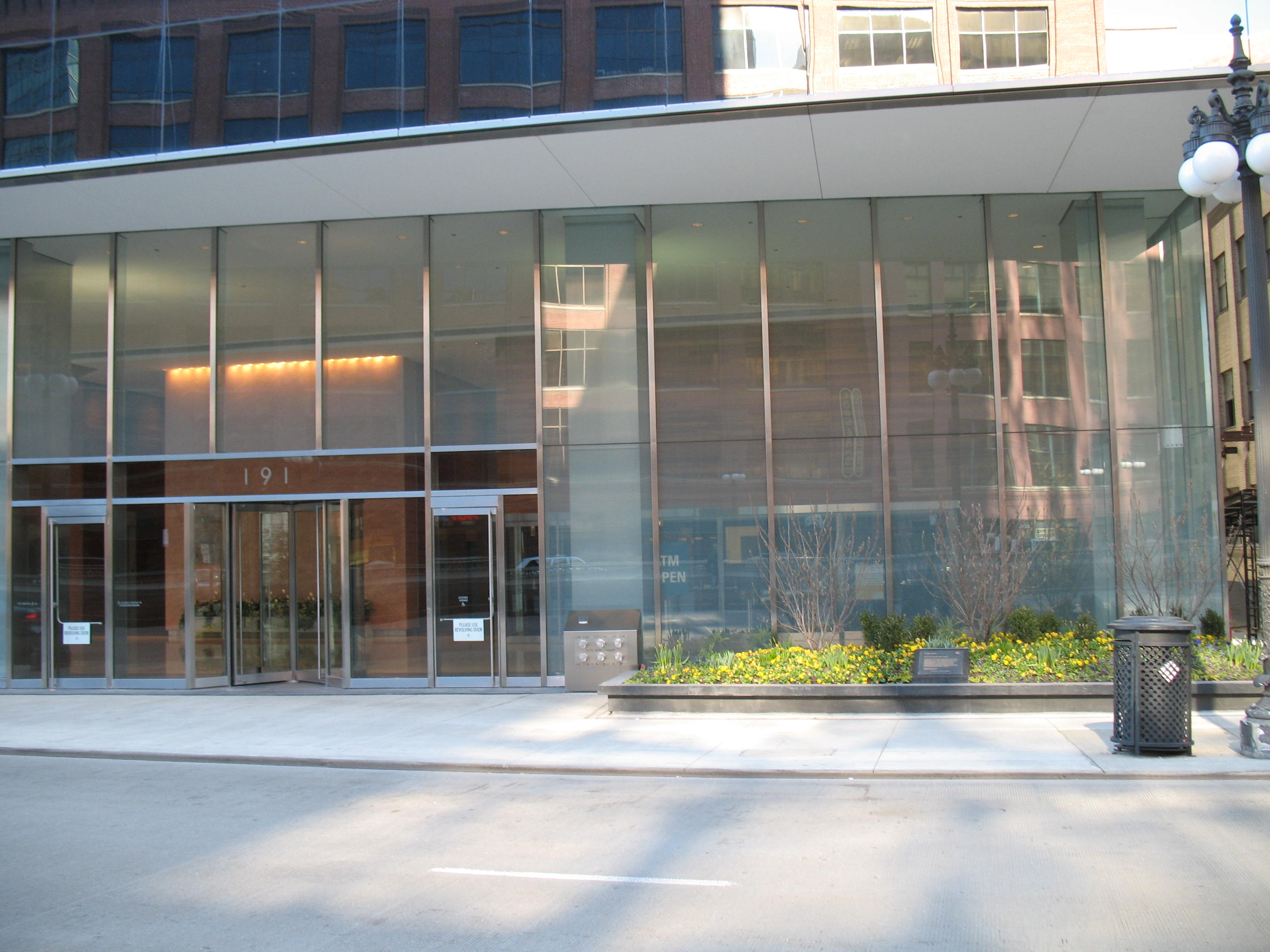
Chicago Landmark plaque and 191 N. Wacker entrance

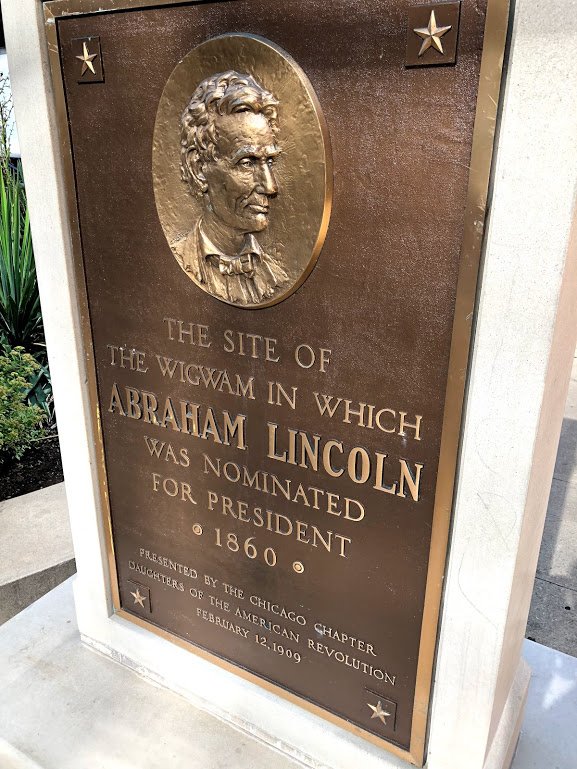
A plaque dedicated by the Daughters of the American Revolution, marking the spot of the Wigwam. First unveiled in 1909, it was found in storage and rededicated in 2017. The reverse side is a plaque that marks the spot of the Sauganash Hotel.
