= Shabbona =

Potawatomi chief

Shab-eh-nay
- Zhaabne, Zhabné
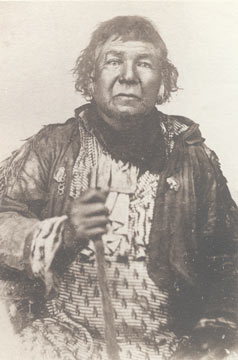
- Born: c. 1775; Ohio, Ontario, or Illinois
- Died: July 17, 1859; Section 20, Norman Township, Grundy County, Illinois, United States
- Resting place: Evergreen Cemetery, Morris, Illinois
- Other names: Shabbona; Shabbonee
- Citizenship: Odawa, Potawatomi
- Occupation: Native American chief
- Known for: Keeping Potawatomi people out of the Black Hawk War
- Title: Chief

Shabbona or Shab-eh-nay, sometimes referred to as Shabonee and Shaubena (c. 1775 – 1859), was an Odawa tribe member who became a chief within the Potawatomi tribe in Illinois during the 19th century.

== Early life ==
Shabbona was born around 1775 of the Odawa (Ottawa) tribe either on the Maumee River in Ohio, in Ontario or in a Native American village in Illinois. Shabbona's own biography places his birth on the Kankakee River; "Shaubena, according to his statement, was born in the year 1775 or 1776, at an Indian village on the Kankakee River, now in Will county." This may be reflective of Will County today or in Kankakee County of today, but Will county was reduced in size in 1853, several years before "Memories of Shabbona" was published.

His name comes from either the Ottawa Zhaabne or the Potawatomi Zhabné meaning "indomitable" or "hardy" in both languages, but was recorded to mean "built strong like a bear" or "built like a bear".

The Odawa are an Algonquian-speaking tribe that was driven out of Ontario, Canada, by the Iroquois and moved west into Michigan. Once in Michigan, the tribe aligned with The Council of Three Fires (Ojibwa, Odawa and Potawatomi) and moved further south across Ohio, Indiana and Illinois. The Odawa became very closely intermixed with the Potawatomi at this time. Shabbona was said to be a grandnephew of Pontiac, the famous Odawa leader. Shabbona was granted his chief status at a very young age. The son of an Odawa warrior who had fought with Pontiac during Pontiac's War, Shabbona himself would become a lieutenant under Shawnee chieftain Tecumseh and, during the War of 1812, later participated in the Battle of the Thames where Tecumseh was killed.

== Wars ==
=== War of 1812 ===
Shabbona was an accomplished warrior who fought alongside Tecumseh during the War of 1812 while aligned against the United States. Shabbona helped persuade many Native Americans in the Northwest Territory to oppose the white settlers and side with Tecumseh and the British in an all-out war. Following Tecumseh's death, Shabbona abandoned his stance against the United States and allied himself with them permanently, feeling that fighting was in vain.

In 1810, Tecumseh visited Shabbona's village west of Chicago. He readily agreed with Tecumseh and joined his recruiting party to visit the Potawatomi, Sac, Fox, Winnebago, and Menominee of Northern Illinois and Wisconsin. Their journey returned them home via Prairie du Chien, Wisconsin, down the Mississippi to Rock Island and then east to Chicago. When Gov. Harrison marched north to Prophetstown on the Tippecanoe in November 1811, Shabbona was there with Waubansee and Winamac to lead the Potawatomi warriors against the Americans. The defeat of the Indian confederacy scattered the tribes to their home villages. Then in 1812, Shabbona joined with Main Poc in a move to Canada to join the British during the War of 1812. In September 1813, when Captain Perry defeated the British fleet on Lake Erie, the British began their evacuation of Detroit. Shabbona, Mad Sturgeon, and Billy Caldwell accompanied Tecumseh and the British into Canada. On September 27, at the Battle of the Thames, the American overtook the retreating British and Indian forces. As the pitch of battle swirled around Tecumseh, the British troops were the first to quit the battle. When Tecumseh fell, the warriors dispersed through the forest and made their way back to their villages in Indiana and Illinois.

=== Red Bird Uprising ===
In 1815, with the treaty ending the war, Shabbona and Senachewine were supported by the Indian Agent at Peoria as the tribal leaders against the Fort Wayne Agent's selection of Five Medals and Metea and the Chicago Indian Agent's support of Topinabee and Chebass. The confusion caused by these separate designations of tribal leaders increased confusion among the Americans who sought to designate a single chief. During the Winnebagos' Red Bird uprising of 1825 north of Lake Geneva, Wisconsin, Shabbona volunteered with Billy Caldwell, Robinson, and Shamagaw (from Kankakee) to go to Big Foot's village on Geneva Lake to determine if any of the Potawatomi nation were involved. They discovered that the chiefs were all at the Winnebago village on Lake Koshkonong. Shabbona entered the village alone, hoping that his lone presence would not upset the village. He was immediately confined as a spy for the Americans. They agreed to release Shabbona if he would return directly to his village and not report to the Americans in Chicago. Not trusting him, the Winnebago provided an escort. As this group passed the hiding place of Caldwell, Robinson, and Shamagaw, he loudly complained of the incident. In this way, Shabbona reached his own village with his escort, while Caldwell, Robinson, and Shamagaw returned quietly to Chicago and reported to the Americans. At the Treaty of Prairie du Chien (June 1829), Shabbona received a grant of land for his service during the Red Bird uprising.

=== Black Hawk War ===
On April 5, 1832 Sauk Chief Black Hawk crossed the Mississippi River into Illinois, the move triggered a war in Illinois and present-day southern Wisconsin. During the first phase of the Black Hawk War Shabbona met with Black Hawk at Saukenuk, a Sauk village, where he warned Black Hawk not to resist white settlement. On May 16, 1832, Shabbona, knowing he could not control all Potawatomi, rode across northern Illinois to warn the settlers of impending danger. During this ride, Shabbona warned settler William Davis and the others at his settlement of the danger. Davis and the other settlers would become the victims of the Indian Creek massacre on May 21, 1832. During the short war, he also acted as a guide for the white militia in its many marches across Illinois.

Shabbona would warn settlers on several occasions of hostile tribes, including one incident where he rode from Princeton to Chicago in one night to warn residents of an impending attack.

== Late life ==
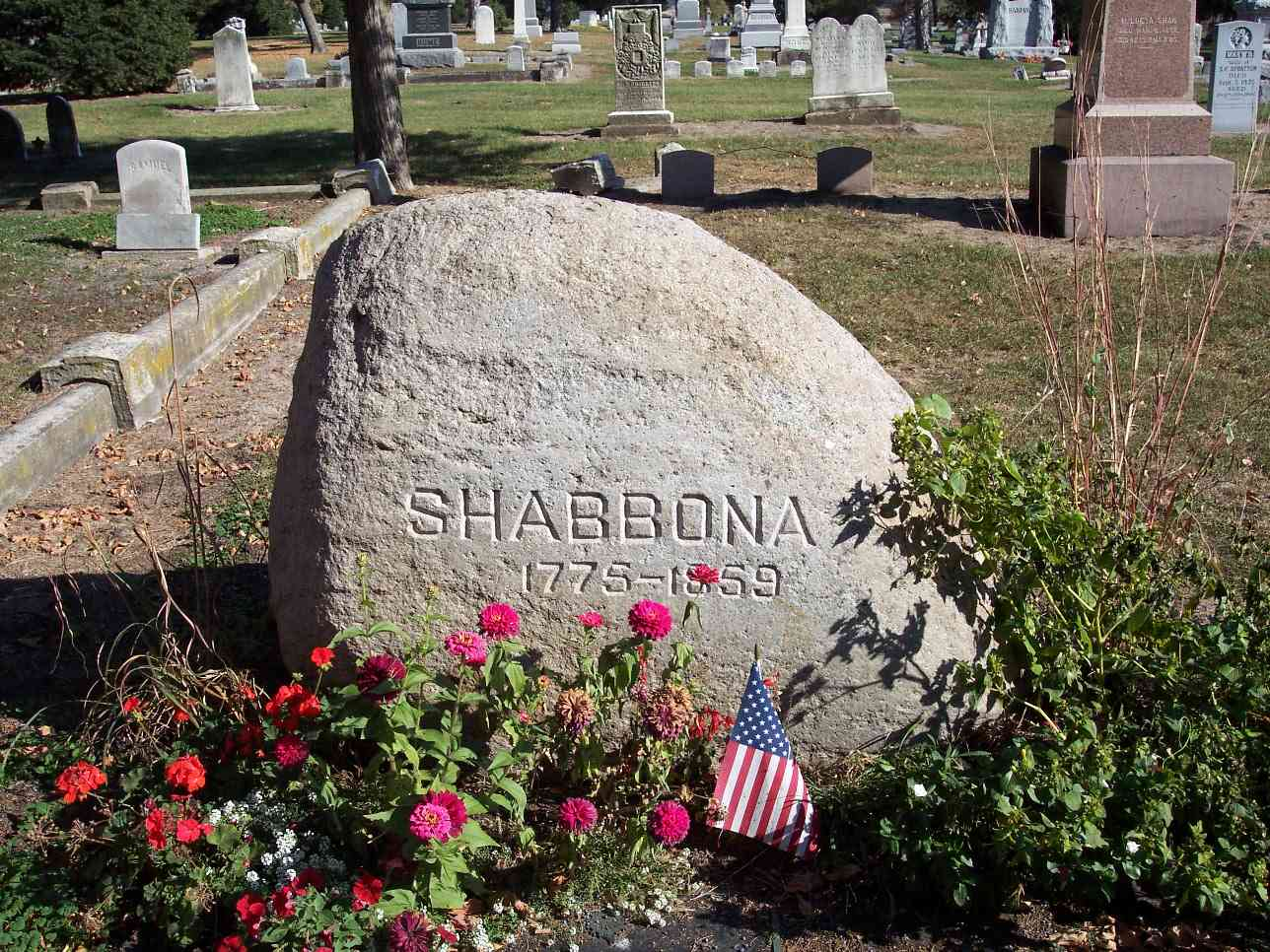
Chief Shabbona's Grave Site near Morris, Illinois

September 1836 saw the removal of the Potawatomi from northern Illinois. The trek west was plagued by rain. At Quincy, Illinois, Shabbona and Waubonsie's party joined with the main group moving west and they traveled together to join Billy Caldwell's people in the Platte country of Nebraska. The story is told around Peru, Illinois, on the Illinois River that Shabbona returned from the west and died in that area. In Peru is Shabbona's rock, where he is said to have spent his days watching the seasons change. He is known in that area as a firm friend of the whites, counseling peace, and cooperation.

Shabonna died at his home in section 20, Norman Township, Grundy County, Illinois, on July 17, 1859, at the age of 84 and, in 1903, a large granite boulder was erected as a monument on his gravesite in Evergreen Cemetery. Shabbona's wife, whom he married around 1800, was Coconako (or Pokanoka, Pokenoquay), daughter of Chief Spotka. She is also buried at Morris, Illinois, having drowned in the Mazon River, a tributary of the Illinois River, in December 1864, five years after the death of her husband.

== Legacy ==
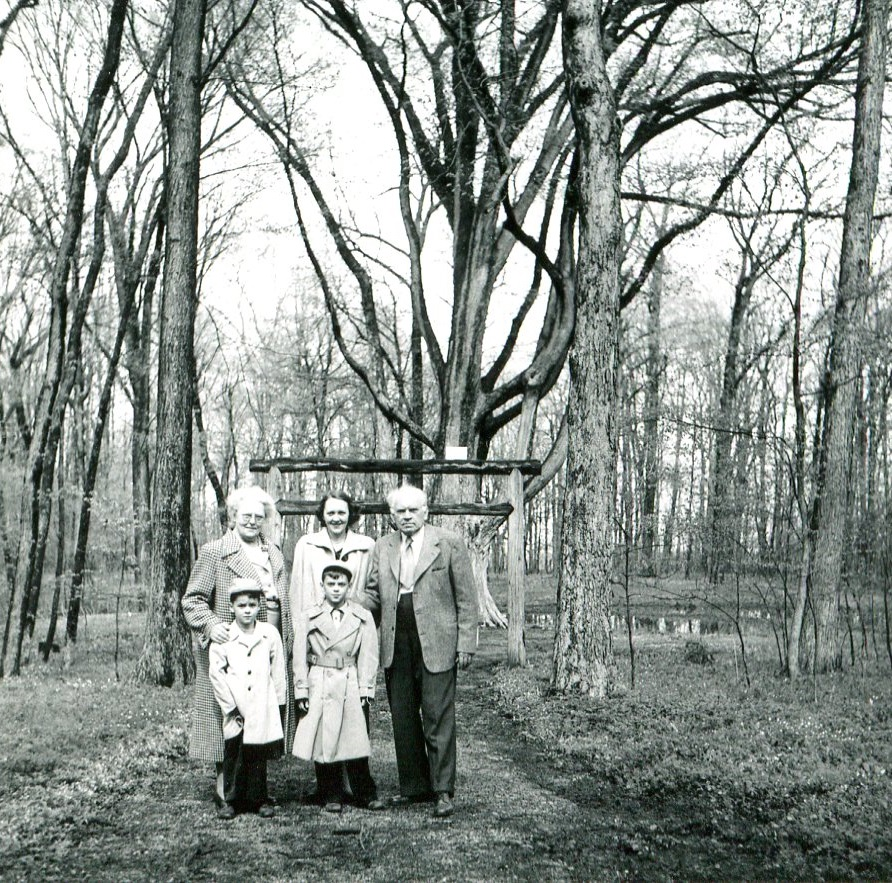
Tribal meetings once took place at Johnson's Mound's Shabbona Tree in Elburn, Illinois (here visited by Stefan Anderson and party in 1955); it was taken down in 1972.

The unincorporated community of Shabbona was named before 1909 in his honor in Evergreen Township, Michigan.

The Shabbona Trail was established in the 1950s by Troop 25, featuring a variety of woodland habitats. The trail is Nationally Approved by the Boy Scouts of America and follows the paths that Shabbona was known to have walked. The trail is 20 miles in length extending from Joliet, Illinois to Morris, Illinois. Chief Shabbona Trail Flyer is a printable trail Map.

=== DeKalb County land ===
Since the death of Shabbona, there has been an ongoing effort to reclaim a reserve that was afforded to Shabbona in the 1829 Second Treaty of Prairie du Chien. In Article III of the treaty, a 1,280-acre (520 ha) reserve was created for Shabbona and his band in what is now DeKalb County, Illinois. Reclaiming this grove has chiefly been pursued by the Prairie Band Potawatomi Nation. From the time of Shabbona's death to 2001, little recognition was offered by the Department of Interior. However, in 2001 the Solicitor wrote an opinion that concluded that the grove was indeed a reserve and the ownership was vested to the Prairie Band Potawatomi Nation. In 2007, an opposing group funded a study into the history of Shabbona's grove and the Prairie Band Potawatomi Nation has submitted volumes of legal and historical documents.

While seeking recognition of the DeKalb County tribal land, the Prairie Band over the decades succeeded in purchasing 120 acres of land there. In 2024, they became the first and only recognized tribe with land under tribal sovereignty in Illinois, when the Department of Interior accepted this parcel as trust land. On March 21, 2025, Illinois Governor JB Pritzker signed legislation authorizing the transfer of ownership of Shabbona Lake State Park to the Prairie Band Potawatomi Nation.
