= Alexander Robinson (chief) =

British chief

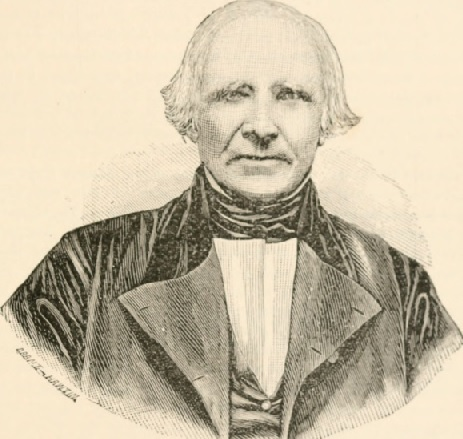
- Born: Che-che-pin-quay c. 1789; Mackinac Island, Michigan
- Died: April 22, 1872; Leyden Township, Cook County, Illinois, US
- Occupations: fur trader, farmer
- Known for: Rescued victims of the Fort Dearborn Massacre; translator during Treaty of St. Louis (1816); Potawatomi chieftain during the Second Treaty of Prairie du Chien (1829), Blackhawk War and Treaty of Chicago (1833)

Alexander Robinson (1789 – April 22, 1872) (also known as Che-che-pin-quay or The Squinter), was a British-Ottawa chief born on Mackinac Island who became a fur trader and ultimately settled near what later became Chicago. Multilingual in Odawa, Potawatomi, Ojibwa (or Chippewa), English and French, Robinson also helped evacuate survivors of the Fort Dearborn Massacre in 1812. In 1816, Robinson was a translator for native peoples during the Treaty of St. Louis. He became a Potawatomi chief in 1829 and in that year and in 1833, he and fellow Metis Billy Caldwell served as councilors for the Council of Three Fires for numerous treaties signed with the United States. Although Robinson helped lead Native Americans across the Mississippi River in 1835, unlike Caldwell, Robinson returned to the Chicago area by 1840 and lived as a respected citizen in western Cook County until his death decades later.

== Early and family life ==
Born to an Ottawa mother and a Scots-Irish immigrant fur trader father on Mackinac Island (a.k.a. Michilimackinac) at the northern edge of Lake Michigan. His mother died shortly thereafter en route to Montreal, Canada, where Robinson was baptized at age seven months on May 15, 1788. As described below, as a young man Robinson would be apprenticed to a fur trader further south in Michigan, Joseph Bailly, where he learned the fur trade but not how to read and write in any European language, instead devising a script to keep his accounts.

Chief Alexander Robinson (Cheecheepinquay) married his first wife, Sasos (Cynthia) Caron, a Menominee woman and daughter of Chief Little Wolf, around 1810 in Michigan. They had a daughter, Margaret, and Sahsos is connected to the Menominee Indian Reservation in Wisconsin. Despite taking a second wife in 1826, Sahsos remained in the family circle, with later reports indicating she moved north to the Menominee Reservation.

In Chicago (then attached to Peoria County, Illinois as an unincorporated territory) on September 28, 1826, Robinson married Catherine Chevalier (d. 1860), trader John Kinzie officiated as Justice of the Peace. Chevalier was the granddaughter of the Potawatomi warrier Naunongee (who died in the Battle of Fort Dearborn), through his daughter Chopa (also known as "Marianne") and her husband Francois Chevalier, all of whom lived in the Calumet/Fox River area. Francois Chevalier became chief of the village near Lake Calumet in southern Cook County, Illinois after his father-in-law's death. Her sister Josette had married Jean Baptiste Beaubien, who had also learned the fur trade from Bailly, and her sister Archange married trader Antoine Ouilmette. Father Stephen Badin would baptize several of Alexander and Catherine's children during his visits to the Chicago area.

== Career ==
By the time Robinson was 11, he was working for British fur trader Joseph Bailly, who at the time traded with the Ottawa people in what became Michigan, including near the St. Joseph River which empties into Lake Michigan. Robinson never learned to read and write a European language, but kept accurate accounts in characters of his own devising.

By 1809 Robinson had traveled along Lake Michigan's southern shore to what later became Chicago on Bailly's behalf to purchase grain. By 1812, Robinson had built a house on the south branch of the Chicago River, next to the LaFramboise family at a settlement sometimes called Hardscrabble or the Leigh Farm. Not far away and more than a decade earlier, various metis had built a settlement on the river's north bank. Trader Jean Lalime had built a house and outbuildings, which were purchased by Jean Baptiste Point du Sable, who in turn sold them to American trader John Kinzie in 1804. Kinzie and his wife Eleanor (who had spent several years as a captive of the Seneca in Pennsylvania) lived next to his subordinate Antoine Ouilmette and his Potawatomi wife, the aforementioned Archange Chevalier.

=== Fort Dearborn ===
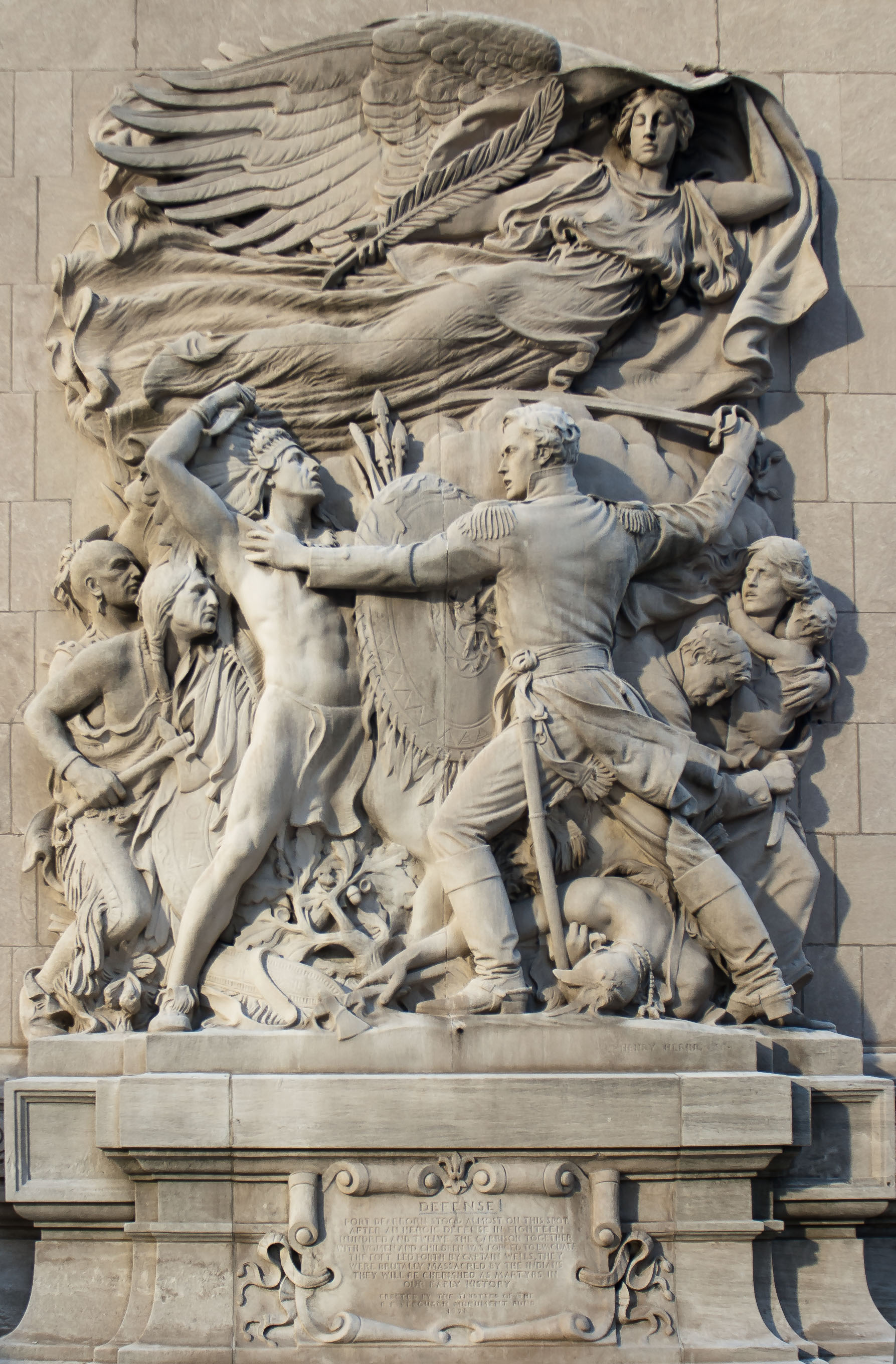
Commemorative bridge plaque

After the Fort Dearborn massacre of 1812, Robinson (who had just returned from a trip to Bailly's trading post), with Black Partridge, Waubonsie, and Shabbona, protected Kinzie and his family from hostile Wabash warriors. Robinson transported, by canoe, the Kinzie family to St. Joseph, Michigan. Then, for the significant sum of $100, Robinson also undertook the dangerous mission of transporting the wounded U.S. Captain Nathan Heald and his wife Rebekah Wells (niece of former Indian Agent William Wells who died in the massacre) and Sergeant William Griffith by canoe (over two weeks) to the British fort on Mackinac Island, from where they eventually reached British-occupied Detroit, then Buffalo. Later, in 1814, Kinzie's half brother Robert Forsyth and other Americans would capture Bailly and three other pro-British traders at the St. Joseph River post, then Kinzie and his aide Jean Baptiste Chandonnai persuaded native leaders to an American-led conference at Greenville, Ohio which led to a treaty ending hostilities in the region.

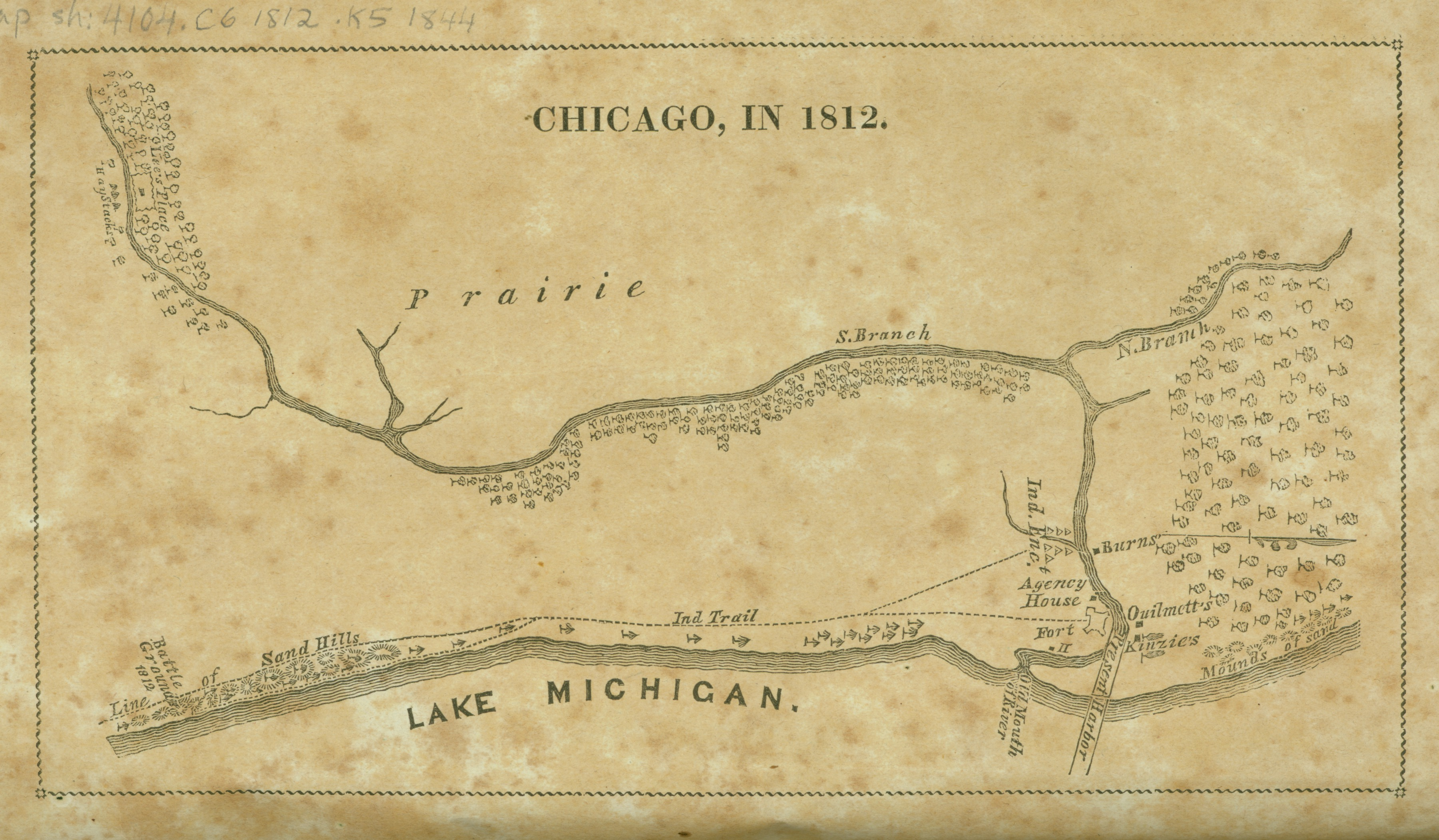
Retrospective map showing how Chicago may have appeared in 1812(right is north)

Although Fort Dearborn had been destroyed shortly after the battle, Robinson and fellow trader Ouilmette farmed there before the fort was rebuilt in 1816. They then sold produce to the U.S. Army. Perhaps as early as 1814, and until 1825, Robinson had a trading post and farm somewhat away from the fort at Hardscrabble near the Chicago Portage. (After his release, Bailly would establish the Joseph Bailly Homestead in what would later become the Indiana Dunes National Lakeshore). During this period Robinson worked for various companies, including the American Fur Company under John Crafts and later the returned John Kinzie, until 1828 when Kinzie died and the American Fur Company left the region since fur-bearing animals had vanished not long after the development of the steel trap. Late in that decade, Robinson also had a trading post at Wolf Point, and later had a tavern in Cook County.

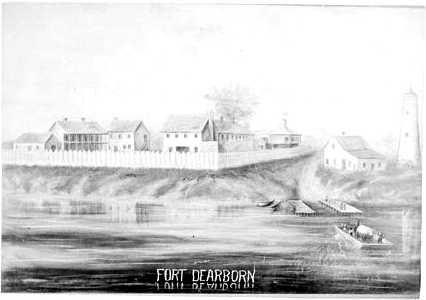
Fort Dearborn as rebuilt in 1816

=== Treaty signatory ===
In 1816, because of his linguistic abilities, Robinson translated for various tribal chiefs in what became the Treaty of St. Louis, which modified the demarcation between lands open for white settlement and Indian country set in the 1795 and 1814 Treaties of Greenville. This 1816 treaty became the first in which the Potawatomi sold land near their villages, in exchange receiving $1000 in merchandise annually for twelve years. Although the Greenville treaty only ceded the immediate area of Fort Dearborn for white settlement, further settlement would be authorized in the 1821 Treaty of Chicago.

It is often claimed that the Indian Agent at Chicago, Dr. Alexander Wolcott Jr. facilitated the election of Robinson and his fellow Métis friend Captain Billy Caldwell as Potawatomi chiefs by 1829 to fill vacant positions, so the Council of Three Fires could sign further cession treaties. The proceedings of the 1833 Treaty of Chicago directly contradict this claim. The U.S. commissioners stated that "we expressed to you our great satisfaction, when you informed us you had chosen Caldwell & Robinson, whom you had appointed your chief councilors at Prairie du Chien . . . these friends whom you have just chosen to advise with, consult and take their opinions about your concerns, but they are not chiefs and we cannot treat with them."

The two mixed-race men thus served as councilors for the Chippewa, Ottawa and Potawatomi peoples in negotiating the Second Treaty of Prairie du Chien with the United States. By that year, the U.S. was working on Indian Removal as advocated by President Andrew Jackson; Congress soon passed the Indian Removal Act of 1830 to authorize the process. For his work in obtaining the 1829 treaty, the U.S. granted Robinson $200 (equivalent to $6,047 in 2025) annually and a 2 section or 1,280-acre (520 ha) tract, known as the Robinson's Reserve, along the Des Plaines River, near Caldwell's 2.5 section or 1,600 acre reserve along the North Branch of the Chicago River.

In the Blackhawk War of 1832, Robinson, Waubonsie and Aptakisic kept all the young warriors encamped near what became Riverside, Illinois as the womenfolk continued to farm; thus avoiding involvement in the conflict. Caldwell, despite fighting for the British in the prior conflict, led other Potawatomi as scouts to assist the U.S. Army.

Robinson and Caldwell also helped negotiate the 1833 Treaty of Chicago after natives lost the Blackhawk War. Wolcott had died and Thomas Jefferson Vance Owen became Indian Agent at Chicago until that office closed in 1835. The treaty technically exchanged 5,000,000 acres (2,000,000 ha) of Indian lands northeast of the Mississippi River for roughly equal acreage west of the river, with additional compensation. In fact, it led to the final Indian Removal from the region, although some like Robinson negotiated a right to remain on their property. Circa 1835, he and Caldwell migrated with their people from the Chicago region westward to Platte County, Missouri, but as Robinson returned to his reservation near Chicago, Caldwell, Shabbona and their people would later be moved again. The 1833 treaty initially provided Caldwell and Robinson each with $10,000 (equivalent to $333,621 in 2025), as well as a $400 (equivalent to $13,345 in 2025) lifetime annuity for Caldwell, and a $300 (equivalent to $13,345 in 2025) annually for Robinson, among other specific provisions. Before the U.S. Senate ratified the treaty in 1835, it reduced the two men's lump-sum payments to $5,000 (equivalent to $156,048 in 2025) each, but left their annuities intact. Robinson and some other Métis remained in or returned to Illinois on their private tracts of land, but most of the United Nations Tribes removed to Missouri and then to Iowa.

=== Later years ===
By 1840, Robinson returned to the Chicago area, although he would later make visits to Kansas, as well as continue to entertain visiting Native Americans on his land. By 1845 he built a house on the Robinson Reserve in what later became Schiller Park near the future O'Hare Airport, and family members would also build nearby. In the 1850 census, Robinson farmed in what became Leyden Township and lived with his wife and some of their 11 children, including adult sons Joseph Robinson (1828-1884) and David Robinson (1830-1863) and daughters Cinthia Robinson (1837-) and their youngest, Mary Ann Robinson Ragor (1839-1904).

He had become a gentlemen farmer, although his children by his first wife remained to the north, and others moved out of the Chicago area. To note: Sasus the first wife was a full blood Menominee Indian she moved to the Menominee Indian Reservation most likely around 1854 or afterwards when the last treaty w/the Menominee was signed. Cheecheepinquay & Sasus daughter Wakohwapeh aka Margaret Robinson also moved with her Mother up North as referred above info. Up North meaning the Menominee Indian Reservation, where there are numerous descendants. His son David Robinson would die as a Union private in a military hospital in Murfreesboro, Tennessee during the American Civil War, but Robinson continued to regale visitors about meeting Abraham Lincoln long before. After the Great Chicago Fire, Robinson returned to the city to view the scene from the Lake Street bridge, reportedly exclaiming "Once more I can see the prairie of the past." Eventually, his youngest child, Mary Ann Robinson Ragor became the family matriarch into the 20th century.

== Death and legacy ==
Robinson briefly returned to view Chicago after the Great Chicago Fire and compared it to the prairie of his youth. He died on his land on April 22, 1872.

Part of the Robinson Reserve, including a burial ground for many Native Americans, was never sold until acquired by the Cook County Forest Preserve District in 1955 after Robinson's house burned down and his granddaughter Mary Boettcher (who had preserved the area for decades) could not rebuild. The Forest Preserve District forbad further family burials in 1973; Robinson's gravestone was removed to a maintenance facility and lost for many years before being returned to descendants in 2016. Litigation concerning the condemnation may be ongoing. The old burial ground has become associated with ghost legends, hence the closest parking lot is now closed.

In 1940, as part of the Treasury Relief Project, Federal Writers' Project supervisor George Melville Smith (1879-1979) painted "Indians Cede the Land", a mural for the Park Ridge, Illinois post office. It may depict a younger Robinson among the Native Americans at the negotiations. Park Ridge was developed on one of the three former Potawatomi villages in the area, as was Forest Glen in Caldwell's Reserve, and either was once part of or adjoins the Robinson Reserve. Removed during post office renovations in 1970, it was restored in 2008 and placed in the Park Ridge Public Library in its 100th anniversary celebration, although temporarily removed during 2018 renovations.
