= Spotka =

- Born: unknown
- Citizenship: Potawatomi
- Occupation: Native American chief
- Title: Chief

Spotka, also known as Hanokula (c. 17??) was chief of a sojourning band of Potawatomi in Illinois during the late 18th and early 19th century.

== Later years ==
As Chief Spotka's life was coming to an end he turned over the responsibility of chief to his son-in-law Shabbona. Upon the change of leadership, Chief Spotka had this to say about Shabbona, "I have always been a warrior and in my youth I won great honors and excelled beyond those with whom I lived and for this I was finally made a chief. At that time, I said when a warrior rose among us who was as I was then, to him I would give over my title. Shabbona is such a one ---not only as I was then, but even more. From this day forward, he is your chief."
