= Norman Township, Grundy County, Illinois =

Norman Township
- Township
- Location in Grundy County

- Grundy County's location in Illinois
- Coordinates: 41°18′04″N 88°31′30″W
- Country: United States
- State: Illinois
- County: Grundy
- Established: November 6, 1849

Area
  - Total: 17.45 sq mi (45.2 km^{2})
  - Land: 16.71 sq mi (43.3 km^{2})
  - Water: 0.73 sq mi (1.9 km^{2}) 4.21%
- Elevation: 614 ft (187 m)

Population (2020)
  - Total: 321
  - Density: 19.2/sq mi (7.42/km^{2})
- Time zone: UTC-6 (CST)
  - Summer (DST): UTC-5 (CDT)
- ZIP codes: 60450, 60479, 61360
- FIPS code: 17-063-53286

Norman Township is one of seventeen townships in Grundy County, Illinois, USA. As of the 2020 census, its population was 321 and it contained 135 housing units.

== Geography ==
According to the 2021 census gazetteer files, Norman Township has a total area of 17.45 square miles (45.20 km^{2}), of which 16.71 square miles (43.28 km^{2}) (or 95.79%) is land and 0.73 square miles (1.89 km^{2}) (or 4.21%) is water.

=== Cities, towns, villages ===
- Seneca (east edge)

=== Unincorporated towns ===
- Langham at 41.2967°N 88.534514°W

(This list is based on USGS data and may include former settlements.)

== Demographics ==
As of the 2020 census there were 321 people, 137 households, and 137 families residing in the township. The population density was 18.40 inhabitants per square mile (7.10/km^{2}). There were 135 housing units at an average density of 7.74 per square mile (2.99/km^{2}). The racial makeup of the township was 93.15% White, 0.00% African American, 0.31% Native American, 0.00% Asian, 0.00% Pacific Islander, 0.93% from other races, and 5.61% from two or more races. Hispanic or Latino of any race were 3.43% of the population.

There were 137 households, out of which 32.80% had children under the age of 18 living with them, 100.00% were married couples living together, 0.00% had a female householder with no spouse present, and 0.00% were non-families. 0.00% of all households were made up of individuals, and 0.00% had someone living alone who was 65 years of age or older. The average household size was 2.93 and the average family size was 2.93.

The township's age distribution consisted of 32.1% under the age of 18, 1.7% from 18 to 24, 23.9% from 25 to 44, 17.4% from 45 to 64, and 24.9% who were 65 years of age or older. The median age was 42.7 years. For every 100 females, there were 149.7 males. For every 100 females age 18 and over, there were 115.0 males.

The median income for a household in the township was $140,060, and the median income for a family was $140,060. Males had a median income of $53,403 versus $81,250 for females. The per capita income for the township was $40,851. About 10.2% of families and 9.7% of the population were below the poverty line, including none of those under age 18 and none of those age 65 or over.

Historical population
Census	Pop.	Note	%±
2000	293		—
2010	308		5.1%
2020	321		4.2%
U.S. Decennial Census

== Political districts ==
- Illinois's 11th congressional district
- State House District 75
- State Senate District 38
