= Billy Caldwell =

Potawatomi leader; War of 1812 veteran

- Sauganash
- Born: March 17, 1782; Near Fort Niagara
- Died: September 28, 1841 (aged 59); Near present day Council Bluffs, Iowa
- Father: William Caldwell
- Relatives: Francis Xavier Caldwell (half-brother)
- Military career
- Allegiance: British Empire
- Branch: British Indian Department
- Rank: Captain
- Conflicts: War of 1812

Billy Caldwell (March 17, 1782 – September 28, 1841) was a Captain in the British Indian Department during the War of 1812, a fur trader, and in his later life a chief of the Potawatomi at Council Bluffs. He was also known as Sauganash, a variant spelling of Zhagnash meaning British or Canadian in the Potawatomi language.

Born in a Mohawk refugee camp near Fort Niagara, Billy was the son of William Caldwell, a Scots-Irish Loyalist officer during the American Revolutionary War, and a Mohawk woman, the daughter of a chief named 'Rising Sun'. His name was not short for William. His half-brother, the eldest son of William Caldwell by his French Canadian wife, was named William Caldwell Junior. Billy was only ever called Billy. Due to his Mohawk-speaking mother, English-speaking father, French-speaking step-mother (Suzanne the daughter of Jacques Baby), his later Potawatomi wives, and years of fur trading among numerous tribes, he became multilingual. He did, however, lose the use of the Mohawk language, with which he had been raised in his youth, due to nonuse.

At seventeen Caldwell moved to Chicago to work as a clerk for John Kinzie and Thomas Forsyth. He remained with them for a few years before starting his own independent trade. When the War of 1812 broke out, he arrived alongside the Potawatomi to fight for the British.

After the war Caldwell returned to the Chicago area. Having gained the respect of many bands of Potawatomi, together with Alexander Robinson, he acted as a chief councilor on behalf of the prairie bands of the Potawatomi in numerous treaties with the U.S. Federal Government. He was involved in the Second Treaty of Prairie du Chien, the 1833 Treaty of Chicago, and others. For his work, the US granted him life annuities as well as a 1600-acre Half-Breed Tract, known as the Caldwell Reserve, along the North Branch of the Chicago River. These treaties, signed under innumerable pressures, sold their ancestral lands and acquiesced to their removal west of the Mississippi River. In 1835, Caldwell migrated with his people from the Chicago region west to Platte County, Missouri.

As a result of the Platte Purchase in 1836, Caldwell and his band were removed from Missouri to Iowa Territory, to the area of Trader's Point (Pointe aux Poules) on the east bank of the Missouri River. While living at Trader's Point, Caldwell led a band of approximately 2000 Potawatomi. Their settlement became known as Camp Caldwell. In 1841 Caldwell died; scholars believe it may have been because of cholera.

== Early life and education ==
Billy Caldwell was born in 1782 near Fort Niagara to a Mohawk woman whose name does not appear in any known record. His father was William Caldwell, a Scots-Irish immigrant who came to North America in 1773 and served as a Loyalist soldier in the Revolutionary War. Living first in Virginia, in 1774 William had fought as an officer with Lord Dunmore and was wounded. After recovering, he went to Fort Niagara in New York, where he fought with Butler's Rangers against Patriot colonists in New York and Pennsylvania.

William Caldwell was likely away on an expedition when Billy was born. He was ordered to Detroit then went south to Kentucky culminating in the Battle of Blue Licks. It is not clear how much of a role William played in his son's early life. He resettled as a Loyalist in Upper Canada, where he was granted land by the British Crown. In addition to clearing land for his own farm, he helped develop the town of Amherstburg, in present-day Ontario.

In 1783, the senior Caldwell married Suzanne Baby (daughter of Jacques Baby), of French-Canadian descent. They had numerous children together, the half-siblings of Billy. When Billy was eleven, his father sent for him to be brought to Detroit. His mother accompanied him but did not stay long. Billy was given a basic Anglo-Canadian education and became Catholic. He was called "naturally smart" and was popular as a result.

== Career ==
At the age of 17, Billy Caldwell entered United States territory for the first time, to learn the fur trade business from Thomas Forsyth and John Kinzie. He kept his British loyalties and learned Potawatomi, an Algonquian language, for dealing with the several tribes of that language family near Lake Michigan. He acted as a trader until the outbreak of the War of 1812.

Caldwell was not at Chicago for the Battle of Fort Dearborn. He had gone south to Vincennes on behalf of Kinzie, who had just killed the translator Jean La Lime, in order to give a statement to Governor Harrison. According to the traditional account, likely a bit fictionalized in Juliette Magill Kinzie's 'Wau-bun, the Early Day in the Northwest', Caldwell arrived just in time to de-escalate the situation and deter young warriors from attacking the Kinzies.

After the Battle of Fort Dearborn, Caldwell returned to Canada to enlist in the British service; he looked for his father's help to gain a commission. The senior Caldwell by then was a Lieutenant Colonel and had gained commissions for his sons by Suzanne. The regular army did not accept Billy Caldwell, but he was commissioned as a captain in the Indian Department. By then he had become influential among the Ojibwa, Odawa, and Potawatomi, tribes inhabiting the area around Lake Michigan, known as the Council of Three Fires.

After the Battle of the River Raisin, Billy reputedly attempted to take a large Kentucky militaman prisoner after he had surrendered. The man thought he was to be killed and jumped on Caldwell, stabbing him in the neck, but Caldwell was saved by a friend before he could be slain. He blamed General Procter for permitting the massacre of unarmed Americans after the battle and called him a coward that was afraid to exercise authority.

In 1814, the Canadians appointed the senior Caldwell as Deputy Superintendent of Indians for the Western District, a position for which the younger Caldwell had competed as well. He was appointed second to his father. In 1815 Amherstburg, Ontario's Commandant, Reginald James, suspended Caldwell Sr. because of problems in supplying the Indians; he appointed Billy Caldwell as Superintendent. The Indian Department quickly found that he could not manage the work and "eased him out" the following year, in 1816.

After healing from his injury at the Raisin, Caldwell fought alongside Tecumseh and the British up until their defeat at the Battle of the Thames. He was disgusted that the British abandoned their indigenous allies when General Procter made an early retreat before the US forces, leaving Tecumseh and his forces to stand alone. Supposedly Caldwell was beside Tecumseh when he died, but the account has some unrelated inaccuracies and therefore might not be trustworthy. Caldwell stated that he had worked with the British in order to keep his promise to his Anishinaabe friends and establish the long-promised boundary between them and European settlement. The war ended with more land being ceded, however, and Caldwell became disillusioned with the British cause.

The younger Caldwell inherited a plot of land in early 1818 after his father's death, but decided to return to the US. He settled in the Fort Dearborn area (now Chicago). He worked hard to gain the Americans' trust, after years of fighting against them. At the same time he continued to work with a local fur trade firm and became active with the tribes in the area.

In August 1826, Caldwell served as a judge in Peoria County, Illinois's first election. Also in 1826, he was recommended to the Governor of Illinois to hold the Justice of the Peace position for Peoria County. That year, he became an appraiser for the estate of John Crafts, a local trader who died during the year of 1825. In 1827, Caldwell worked for the United States to secure information related to a possible Winnebago uprising.

In 1829, Caldwell became one of several councilors to represent the United Nations of the Chippewa, Ottawa, and Potawatomi in negotiations with the United States in the Second Treaty of Prairie du Chien. The US was working on Indian Removal, the process that would be authorized by Congress in 1830. At the same time, their agents were also negotiating with the Winnebago for cessions and removal.

I told you all that I would not be a political Indian any more than what would be a benefit to my red brethren— that is to take them over the Mississippi in order to draw them from the scene of destruction [from] the habits of the white's intemperance.

— Billy Caldwell to Francis Caldwell, Esq., March 17, 1834, Chicago.

In 1833, he helped found the first Catholic church in Chicago, Saint Mary of the Assumption. It was located at what is now Lake Street west of State Street.

Caldwell and his band migrated west in 1835, first settling in Missouri west of the Mississippi River. The treaty provided for a $10,000 payment each to Caldwell and Robinson, and a $400 lifetime annuity for Caldwell, with $300 annually for Robinson. Before the US Senate ratified the treaty in 1835, it reduced the lump-sum payments to the men to $5000 each, but left their annuities intact. Robinson and some other Métis remained in Illinois on their private tracts of land, but most of the United Nations Tribes removed to Missouri and then to Iowa.

It has been claimed that Caldwell and Alexander Robinson were appointed as chiefs by the U.S. Federal government in order to vote for land cessions, or even bribed to do so. The notes of the treaties, however, make it clear that the Government did not consider Caldwell and Robinson to be chiefs. It is made clear that they were councilors, freely consulted with, but were not parties to the treaty. It is unclear exactly when Billy Caldwell became a chief. He was not a hereditary chief of the Potawatomi, but commanded great respect and led a band. After his death, in the 1846 proceedings of Treaty No. 247, he was called, "our great chief Mr. Caldwell."

=== Caldwell Reserve ===
The U.S. awarded Caldwell a Half-Breed Tract, a 1,600 acre reserve on the North Branch of the Chicago River, as part of the 1829 Treaty of Prairie du Chien. In 1833, in preparation for his removal beyond the Mississippi River, Caldwell began selling off his land via the New York attorney Arthur Bronson. According to his land patent, to be legally binding, each deed had to be personally approved by the president.

The tracts of land herein stipulated to be granted, shall never be leased or conveyed by the grantees, or their heirs, to any persons whatever, without the permission of the President of the United States.

— Second Treaty of Prairie du Chien, 1829

In all, six land sales took place from Caldwell's Reserve. These land transactions included: 80 acres to George W. Dole and Richard Hamilton in June 1833 for $100; 160 acres to Richard Nicolas, Sarah Amantus, Eleanor Hamilton, and infant heirs of Richard Jo and Diana W. Hamilton in July 1833 for $200; 160 acres to Philo Carpenter in July 1833 for $200; 720 acres to Arthur Bronson in 1833 for $900; 160 acres to Captain Seth Johnson in November 1833 for $200; 80 and 160 acres, respectively, to Julius B. Kingsbury in November 1834 for $300. This accounted for 1,440 acres of the original 1,600. The first deed to be approved by the president was the 720 acres to Arthur Bronson, with the others eventually being approved as well. Except, that is, for the northernmost 160 acres of the reserve. Deeds for this land have never been approved by a sitting president, and no original deeds from Caldwell exist to be approved. In theory this land, valued at about 500 million dollars is the property of unknown descendants of Caldwell, if they exist.

== Marriage and family ==
Caldwell's marriage and issue is unclear, and numerous contradictory accounts exist. He is traditionally said to have married three times. The first time to a Potawatomi woman, the daughter or niece of Chief Neescotnemeg, the second time to a daughter of Robert Forsythe, and the third time to a Métis woman in Chicago.

When Father Stephen Badin visited Chicago he baptized three daughters by Caldwell and 'Nannette': Helene, Suzanne, and Elizabeth. Caldwell himself spoke of three daughters and a son, Alexander. He said his favorite daughter, Elizabeth, was on the verge of death in March 1834. In November of the same year he married Saqua LeGrande in Chicago. She had a son from a previous marriage by the name of Pewymo. According to him, Caldwell and Saqua had three daughters in Chicago who all died before adulthood. This creates the possibility that Nannette and Saqua were the same person, and they had been together prior to having their marriage endorsed by Father Badin.

One of Caldwell's wives was the niece or daughter of the powerful Potawatomi chief, Mad Sturgeon, Juliette Magill Kinzie in her book Wau-bun refers to the wife of Caldwell as the daughter of Chief Neescotnemeg, referring to Mad Sturgeon. Alexander Robinson wrote that it was his last wife who was the niece of Mad Sturgeon. Gurdon Saltonstall Hubbard said the same.

It is claimed that his son Alexander died in 1832 from alcoholism, however the timing cannot be correct as in 1834 Caldwell wrote a letter to his half-brother Francis complaining that his son Alexander had recently returned to his home "almost naked" and expressed concern about his "future conduct." The strife could very well have been caused by Alexander's overuse of alcohol.

All of Caldwell's children predeceased him. His stepson Pewymo attempted to sell the remaining portion of Caldwell's reserve in the latter half of the 19th century but the Attorney General halted the proceedings on the recommendation of the Bureau of Indian Affairs.

Caldwell had at least four children, though their mothers are unclear:

- Alexander
- Helene
- Suzanne
- Elizabeth

== Indian removal and later years ==
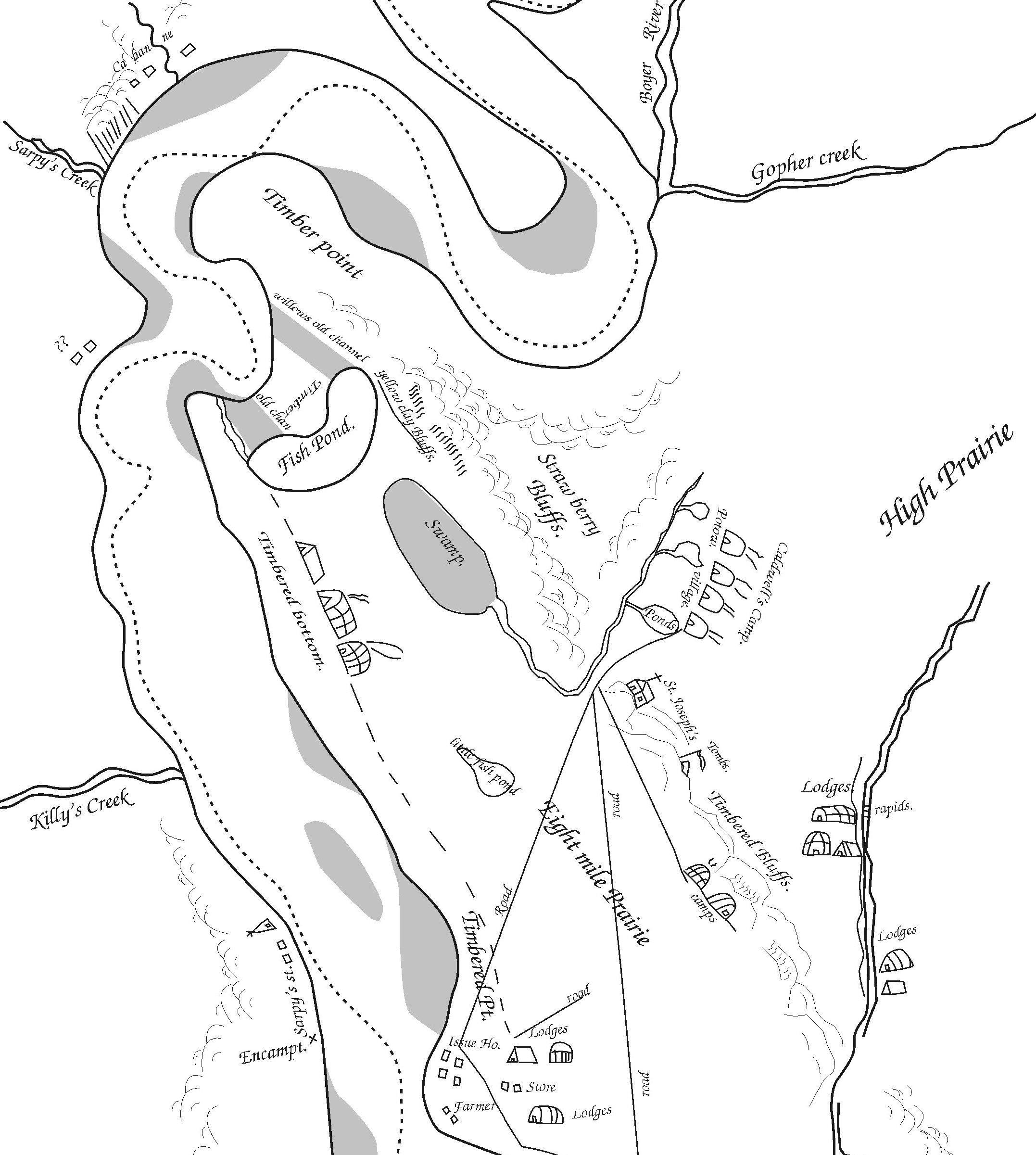
Pierre-Jean De Smet's map of the Council Bluffs, Iowa area, 1839. The area labeled 'Caldwell's Camp' was a Potawatomi village led by Sauganash. The later town of Kanesville, the precursor of Council Bluffs, grew up in that place.

In 1835, Caldwell and his band of Potawatomi left the State of Illinois and relocated to Platte County, Missouri.

In 1836, as a result of the Platte Purchase, Caldwell and his band were removed from this reservation to Trader's Point on the east bank of the Missouri River in the Iowa Territory. The Potawatomi band of an estimated 2000 individuals settled in a main village called "Caldwell's Camp", located where the later city of Council Bluffs, Iowa developed. (This was on the eastern bank of the river, opposite the present-day city of Omaha, Nebraska.)

From 1838 to 1839, Caldwell and his people were ministered to by the notable Belgian Jesuit missionary Pierre-Jean De Smet, based in St. Louis, Missouri. The Jesuit priest was appalled at the violence and desperation that overtook the Potawatomi in their new home, in large part due to the whiskey trade. After De Smet returned to St. Louis, the Catholic mission was abandoned by 1841.

Caldwell died on September 28, 1841; it may have been from cholera. His wife Masaqua died in the winter of 1843.

== Legacy and honors ==
- The Sauganash Hotel, completed in Chicago in 1831 was named in honor of Caldwell.
- Sauganash Golf Club in Three Rivers, Michigan is named for Caldwell.
- Billy Caldwell Golf Course in Chicago is named for Caldwell.
- The Chicago neighborhood of Sauganash, near Caldwell's former reserve, is named after Caldwell's Potawatomi name.
- Caldwell is the subject of two documentary films: Holy Ground which was limitedly released in theatres in December 2023, and The Negotiator: Billy Caldwell, which sold out its June 20, 2024 screening at the Illinois Holocaust Museum.
