= A. S. Trude =

British-American lawyer (1846–1933)

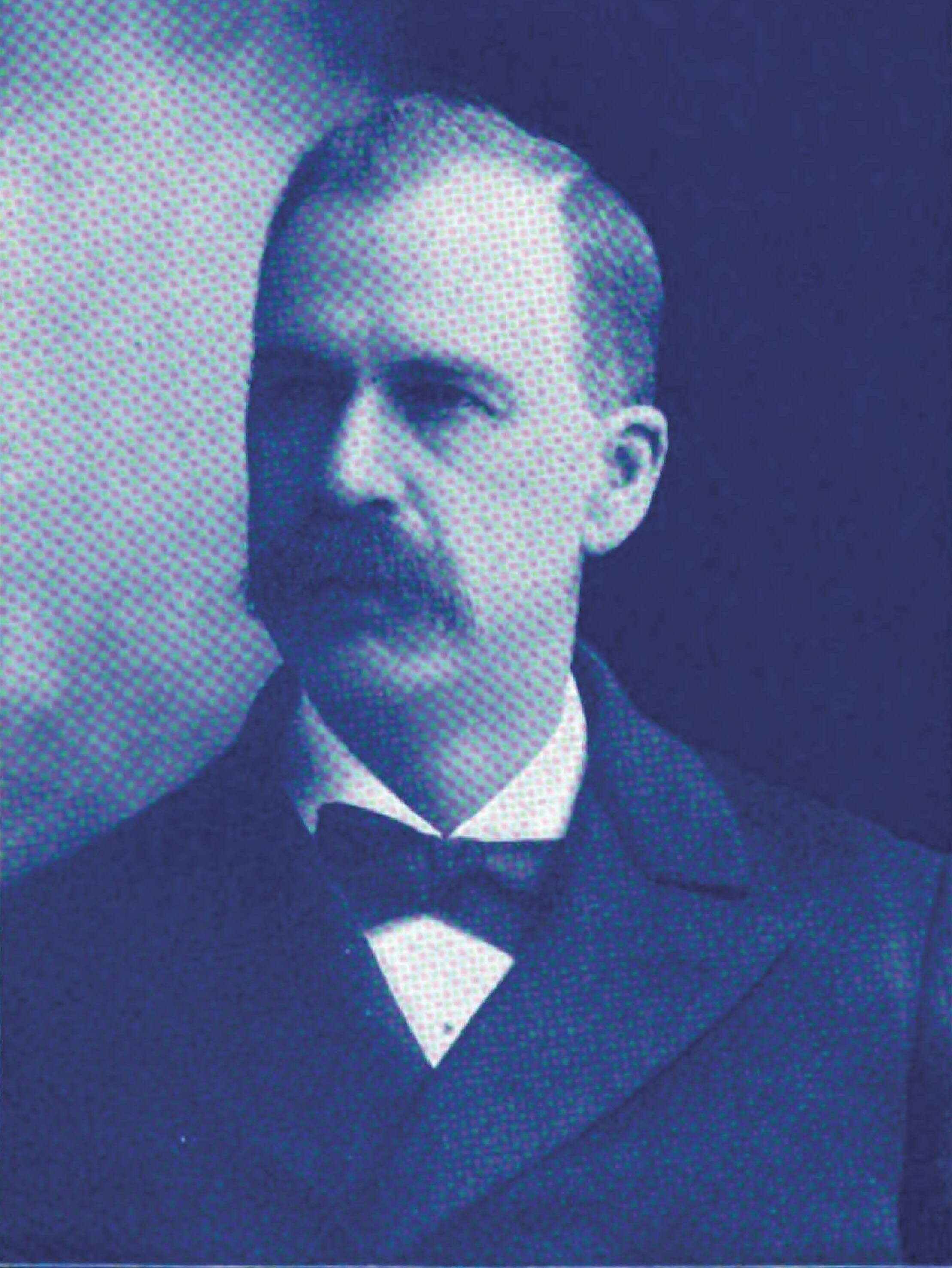
- Trude circa 1899

President of the Chicago Board of Education
- In office 1893–1895
- Preceded by: John McLaren
- Succeeded by: Daniel R. Cameron

Personal details
- Born: April 21, 1846 Devonshire, England
- Died: December 12, 1933 (age 87)
- Education: Union College of Law
- Occupation: Lawyer
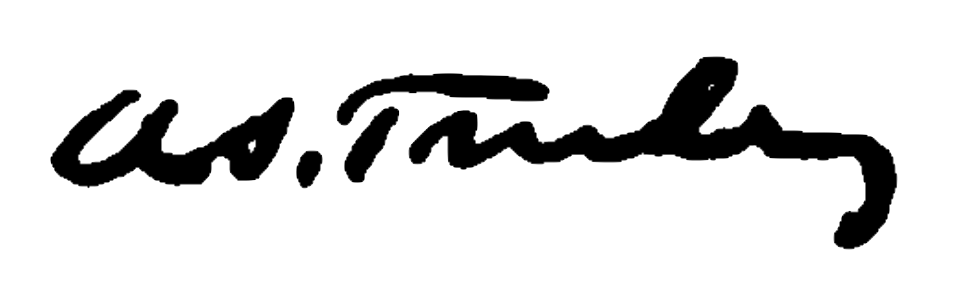
- Signature

Alfred Samuel "A. S." Trude (April 21, 1846 – December 12, 1933) was a British-American lawyer. Trude was one of the most noted attorneys in his time, working on a number of high-profile cases. He resided in Chicago most of his life. While he was largely a civil attorney and occasional criminal defense attorney, among his most famous cases as a lawyer was his successful prosecution of Patrick Eugene Prendergast for the assassination of Carter Harrison III (successfully prosecuting Prendergast both in the murder trial, and a subsequent sanity proceeding).

Trude was also prominently involved in Democratic Party politics and unsuccessfully attempted to secure his party's nomination for mayor of Chicago in 1897 after having previously ruled out a mayoral run in the 1893 special election. Trude served for eight years (1892 to 1900) as a member of the Chicago Board of Education, serving as the Board's president from 1893 to 1895. Trude amassed a significant real estate investment portfolio as well.

== Early life and education ==
Trude was born in Devonshire, England on April 21, 1846, to Samuel Trude and Sally Trude (née Downs). His parents both descended from English farmers. Soon after he was born, he emigrated with his parents from England to the United States. His family settled in Lockport, New York, there. He was educated in the town's Old Union school. Trude and his family later moved to Lindsay in the Canadian province of Ontario. They then moved back to the United States, settling in the city of Chicago, Illinois.

In 1870, Trude graduated from Chicago's Union College of Law (which was affiliated with Northwestern University).

== Legal career ==
Trude was one of the most noted attorneys of his time, working on a number of high-profile cases.

=== Early work ===
Admitted to the bar in 1871, Trude immediately began practicing law. His first high-profile case was representing Thomas London in a marital law case. London was a coachman who had secretly wed his millionaire boss' daughter. In the case, London's employer/father-in-law sought to annul the marriage.

The London case occurred near the office of Chicago Mayor Joseph Medill in the Rookery Building. The mayor overheard Trude presenting his argument in the case and was impressed with Trude. Mayor Medill gave Trude his first criminal case, having him prosecute a case on the city's behalf against three noted gamblers. Trude secured a conviction in this case. Further city prosecutorial work was given to Trude by Mayor Medill.

=== Civil defense work in libel and tort claims against newspapers ===
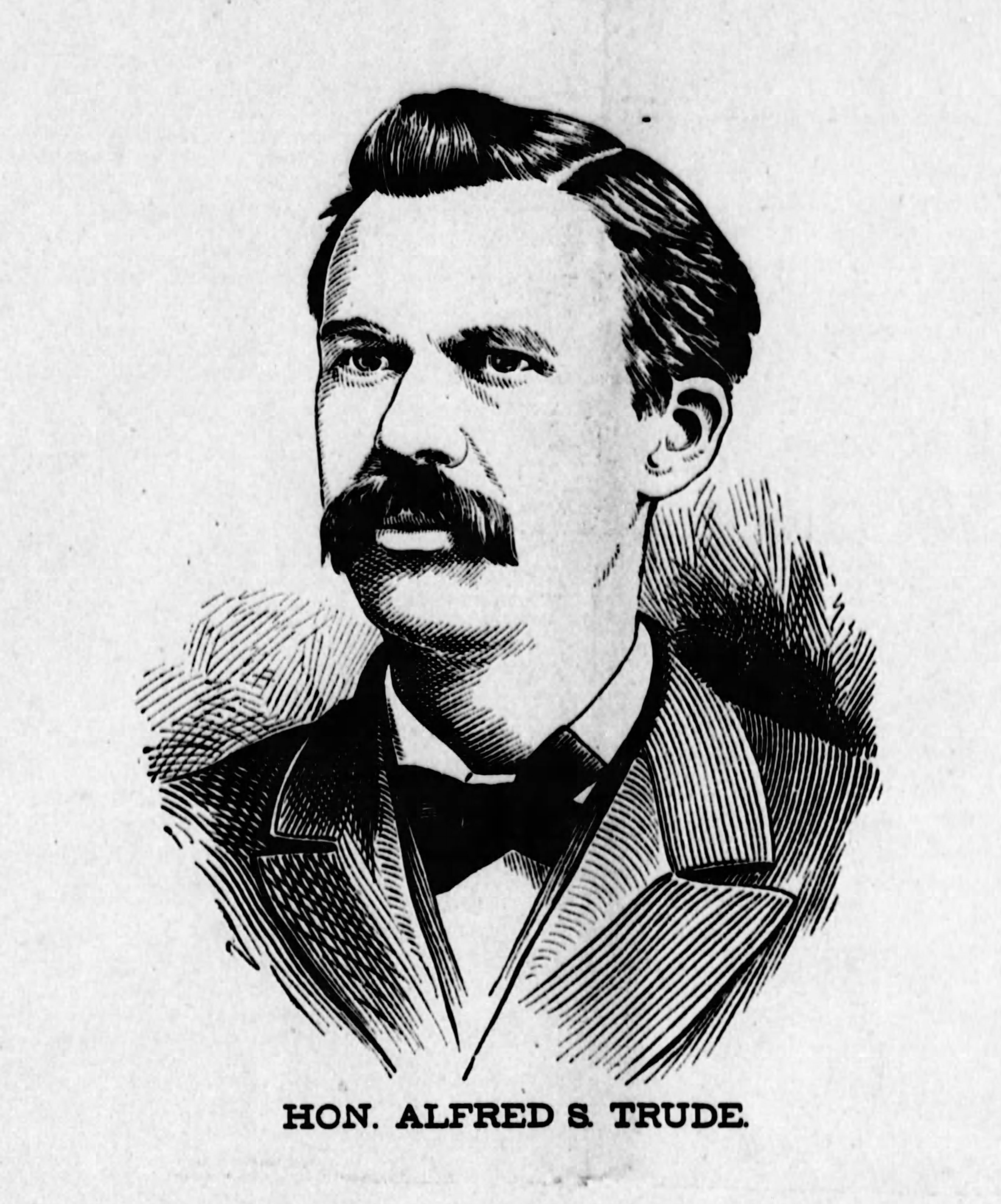
Sketch of Trude circa 1895

After Medill left office as mayor and returned to his private-sector job of running the Chicago Tribune, he frequently hired Trude for the next twenty-seven years to represent the newspaper's defense in libel and tort lawsuits. None of the cases in which Trude defended Chicago Tribune saw plaintiffs recover punitive damages from the newspaper, and nearly all of the verdicts found no guilt on the newspaper's part.

Trude also worked for Chicago Times editor Wilbur F. Storey. Over a ten-year period, Trude is reported to have represented the defense in potentially more than 500 civil and criminal libel lawsuits on Storey's behalf, nearly always securing verdicts that found no guilt on the part of Storey and his newspapers. In one high-profile matter, in August 1876, Wisconsin Governor Harrison Ludington attempted to extradite Storey to Wisconsin from Illinois to try him for criminal libel against the police chief of the city of Milwaukee. Trude prevailed in convincing Illinois Governor John Lourie Beveridge that, since Storey was physically absent from Wisconsin when the alleged libel was published, he could not be found a fugitive from justice as he had not fled from Wisconsin's jurisdiction. Heeding Trude's argument, Beveridge refused to extradite Storey.

In addition, Trude defended other Chicago newspapers, such as the Inter Ocean in libel lawsuits.

=== Other civil litigation ===
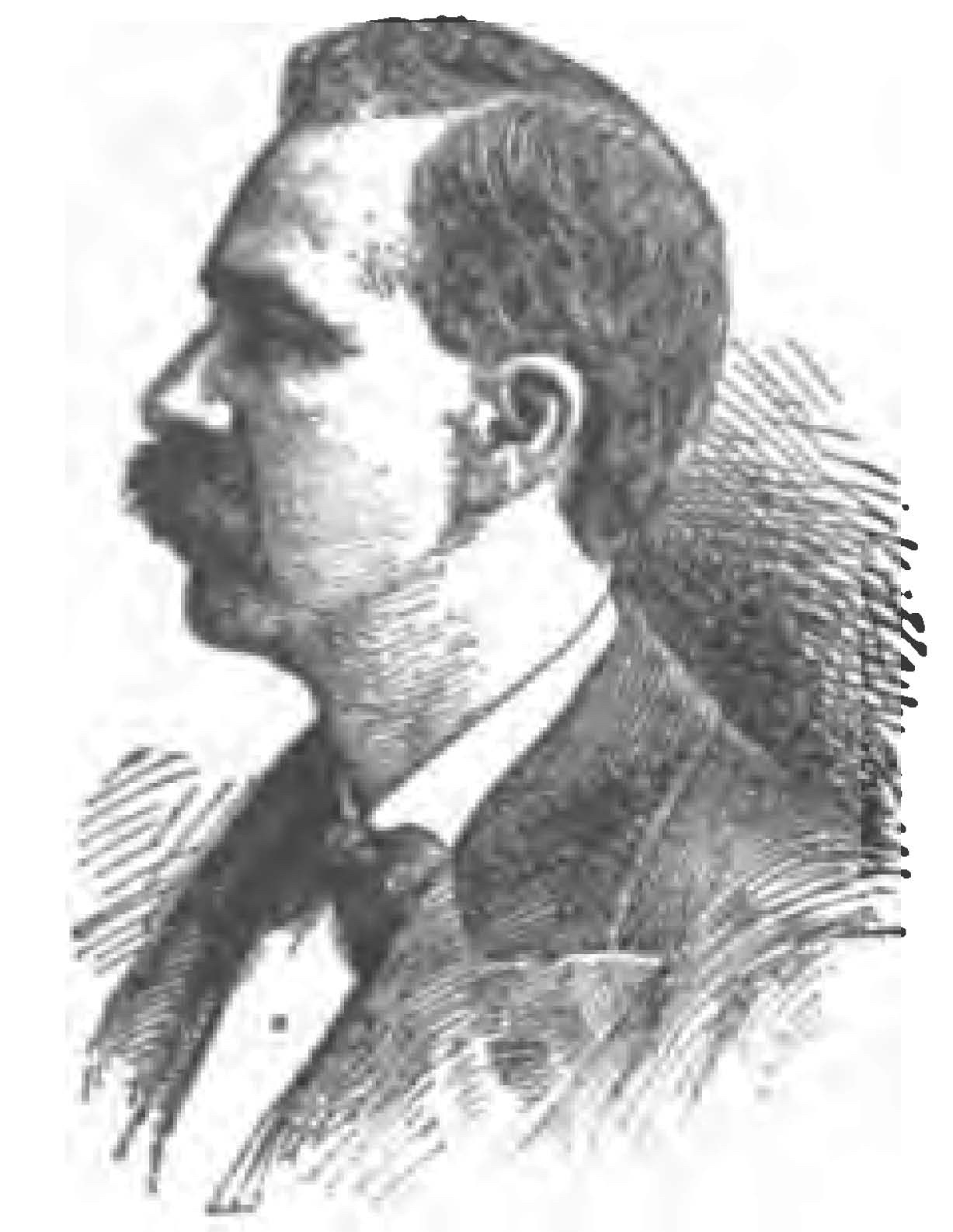
Sketch of Trude, circa 1910

While he generally defended newspapers against libel claims, in 1900 he successfully represented the plaintiff, Ernst Johann Lehmann, in a libel case against the Chicago Herald. Lehmann died days prior to the case being decided. The case centered upon the Herald's having described Lehmann as a "fakir" — a word which was not found in American dictionaries at the time. The court settled upon defining its use as having been synonymous with "swindler". The case was highly contentious. Trude prevailed. After fifteen minutes of deliberation, the jury in the case awarded $25,000 to the plaintiff (Lehmann's estate), which was at the time a national record for such a legal action.

In the 1889 divorce suit between Michael Cassius McDonald and his wife Mary, Trude served as McDonald's solicitor while A.B. Jenks served as counsel.

Trude was a counsel in many high-profile cases of litigation regarding the contesting of wills. This included cases regarding the wills of Wilbur F. Storey, Amos J. Snell. He was successful in both of those cases.

=== Criminal defense work ===
Trude had success in defending many individuals charged with murder and other crimes in the states of Illinois, Kentucky, Michigan, and Missouri. He never accepted a retainer for providing defense to burglars or other professional criminals.

In late 1901, Trude defended Illinois Democratic political boss Robert E. Burke against conspiracy charges. Burke had served as a Chicago municipal oil inspector under Chicago mayor Carter Harrison IV and had been charged with a conspiracy involving $65,000 of payment. Burke had acted in disregard of an agreement he had signed when taking the position to return the fees he collected in return for a flat compensation. Facing the prospect of charges, Burke returned $30,000 to the city in worries that not returning it might place himself in greater legal jeopardy. Burke was prosecuted by Charles S. Deneen, the Republican Cook County state's attorney. Trude successfully used a defectively-constructed ordinance's judicial construction to persuade the three judges presiding over the case (Theodore Brentano, Marcus Kavanagh, and Edward Fitzsimmons Dunne) to rule that the entire $65,000 was actually the rightful property of Burke and that he had actually unwittingly deprived himself of $30,000 of which he was entitled to hold by returning it to the city. He did this by arguing that the city ordinance that had required the Chicago city oil inspector to give the city the fees he collected was, in fact, superseded by the state legislation that had established the position and its provision that allowed for the collection and the retention of all fees by the city oil inspector. Trude successfully argued that this prevented Burke from being criminally charged.

Trude provided defense work in criminal trial related to the Iroquois Theatre fire. In January 1904, he defended Mayor Carter Harrison IV (who was the son of the late Carter Harrison III, who Trude had also represented in matters) In March 1905, he was part of a team of lawyers that sought a change of venue for proceedings related to the fire.

==== Defense of Dora McDonald in her murder trial ====
Trude led a team of notable lawyers that provided the defense for Dora McDonald in her high-profile murder trial. Dora McDonald, who was married to Chicago crime boss and political boss Michael Cassius McDonald, had killed Webster Guerin, a man with whom she had had a decade-long sexual affair. This affair had begun when Guerin, fifteen years her junior, was only a thirteen-year-old high school student. Dora McDonald had suspected Guerin of seeing other women, and on February 21, 1907, went to Guerin's picture studio in Chicago Loop, where an argument broke out between the two and she fired a single fatal gunshot into Guerin. When people, having heard the gunshot, arrived at the studio, Dora McDonald had attempted to claim that Guerin had shot himself. Five minutes after she shot Guerin, police officer Clifton Woodridge (who claimed to be one of Chicago's top detectives, but was not necessarily a reliable source on his own career) arrived at the studio, having, unrelatedly, come to investigate reports of questionable business practices. Dora Feldman McDonald was then arrested for murder, and admitted to police that she had murdered Guerin. The killing had become international news. The trial was anticipated by some in the media to be even more sensationalized than the murder trial of Harry Kendall Thaw for the killing of Stanford White.

Michael Cassius McDonald died in Chicago on August 9, 1907, before the trial began. He had stood by his wife, who told him she had only shot Guerin because she was being blackmailed. He had set up a $25,000 legal defense fund to pay for Dora's legal defense, a significant amount of money in that day.

The defense, led by Trude, argued that McDonald had shot Guerin in self-defense. Ultimately, in January 1908, McDonald was acquitted after only five hours of deliberation by a jury.

=== Prosecution in the murder case against Patrick Eugene Prendergast and work in subsequent litigation ===
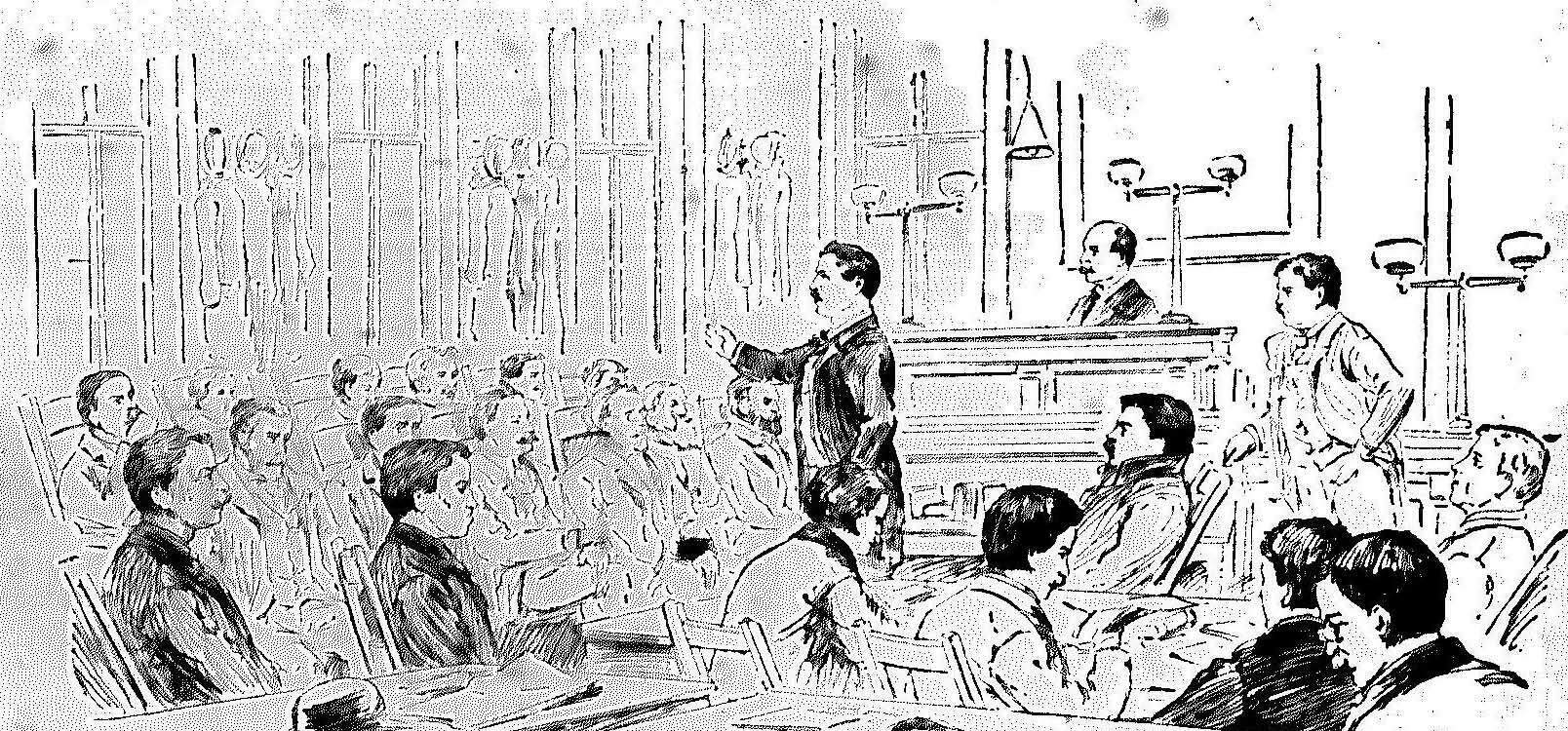
Trude requests the death penalty for Prendergast at the end of the murder trial

After the assassination of Chicago Mayor Carter Harrison III, Trude was initially seen as a likely front-runner to win the mayoralty as a potential candidate in the 1893 Chicago special mayoral election. Trude instead opted to prosecute the case against Harrison's assassin, Patrick Eugene Prendergast. Trude served as the lead counsel prosecuting the state's case against Prendergast, doing so at the request of both the county government and the family of Harrison. This is arguably the most noted matter that Trude worked on. The criminal jury trial took place in the Cook County Criminal Court and was presided over by noted jurist Theodore Brenanto. It began in December 1893. Trude's prosecution prevailed in the criminal trial with Prendergast being found guilty and sentenced to death.

After the conviction, Prendergast appealed his conviction, with his appeals litigation being handled by noted lawyers Clarence Darrow, Stephen S. Gregory, and James S. Harlan. Trude continued to represent the state in the appeals cases. The appeals litigation that followed the Prendergast conviction had major ramifications in setting new state and federal legal precedent. Prednergast's team of attorneys attempted to challenge the conviction with an insanity defense, requesting first to Judge Arthur Chetlain of the Cook County Criminal Court that Prendergast's mental state should be judged by a court and a jury. After Trude objected to the jurisdiction that Chetlain assumed, the case was reassigned to Judge John Barton Payne of the Superior Court of Cook County. Payne impaneled a jury to decide the question of sanity. The jury concluded that Prendergast was sane, and the death sentence was upheld.

After this, a petition for a writ of habeas corpus and a request for a stay of execution were presented on Prendergast's behalf to Judge Peter S. Grossup of the United States District Court for the Northern District of Illinois. Strong arguments were made on Prendergast's behalf by his team of lawyers. However, hours before Prendergast's scheduled July 13, 1894 time of execution, the court issued a detailed opinion in which they refused to stop the execution. Prendergast was hanged. Further legal actions were unsuccessfully attempted by Prendergast's lawyers in the hours between the opinion being issued and the execution being carried out.

=== Other legal work ===
Trude also worked for fifteen years as the general counsel of the Chicago City Railway Company. For ten years, Trude was the trial attorney of the Chicago & Alton Railroad.

Trude helped Chicago Corporation Counsel Adolph Kraus write an opinion that the secret initial secret ballot vote by the Chicago City Council to make George Bell Swift acting mayor of Chicago following Carter Harrison III's assassination had been legally valid. Nevertheless, the City Council still held a second vote which again selected Swift.

== Tenure on the Chicago Board of education ==
Trude served on the Chicago Board of Education for eight years between from 1892 to 1900. He served two terms as the president of the Chicago Board of Education, holding this office from 1893 to 1895.

== Politics ==
Trude was a prominent figure in Democratic Party politics and was a leading figure in Chicago's Democratic politics. He supported Samuel J. Tilden during the 1876 presidential elections and was responsible for recruiting members of the People's Party back to the Democratic Party.

Trude was a delegate to the 1896 Democratic National Convention and a delegate at large to the 1900 Democratic National Convention.

The Chicago Tribune considered Trude to be the likely front-runner in the 1893 Chicago mayoral special election held after Carter Harrison III's assassination and considered him to be preferred candidate of Democrats to run. Trude actively explored a run. However, in mid-November, Trude formally ruled a candidacy out. Trude claimed that he would not run because – among other things – if he were the party's nominee, conflict of interest would have forced his brother George to resign his elected position as city attorney, because that position made George an ex-officio member of the city's election commission. Because George would presumably be replaced by a Republican (due to the makeup of the city's government and the Republican affiliation of Acting Mayor George Bell Swift), Trude argued that it would be problematic because his brother was, "about the only Democrat on that board," and he believed that the Democratic Party's interests would be harmed by ceding that representation on the election commission. As another factor in why he opted against running, Trude cited that he wanted to continue serving on the Chicago Board of Education due to his "deep [interest] in educational matters", and that, if he ran for mayor, he believed that he would be expected to resign from the Chicago Board of Education. Trude was an ally of John Patrick Hopkins after he was elected mayor. Trude was the most prominent backer of Washington Hesing's unsuccessful pursuit of the Democratic Party's mayoral nomination in the 1895 Chicago mayoral election.

Allied at the time with John Peter Altgeld, in 1895 Trude led a successful effort to elect Thomas Gahan as chair of the Cook County Democratic Party. In 1896, after John Peter Altgeld was ousted from his position in the Illinois Democratic Party's Central Committee, Trude was appointed to assume his seat.

Trude sought the Democratic Party's nomination in the 1897 Chicago mayoral election. Trude unsuccessfully sought Altgeld's endorsement. Trude ultimately withdrew his candidacy prior to the party's city nominating convention. Despite Carter Harrison IV having been a recent political rival of his, he formally submitted Harrison's name for the party's mayoral nomination at the nominating convention.

== Real estate investments ==
Trude amassed an impressive portfolio of real estate investments in the Chicago Loop. The realty holdings he held at the time of his death were worth $1,500,000 in 1933 dollars.

One of the properties that Trude owned was the self-named Trude Building at the southwest corner of the intersection of Wabash and Randolph. Designed by Jenney & Mundie, the building was built in a 1897 and housed the headquarters of Lord & Thomas. In 1912, Marshall Field & Co. acquired and demolished the sixteen-floor tower to expand the Marshall Field and Company Building. This is considered to have been one of the first demolitions, if not the first, of a high-rise skyscraper.

In addition to Chicago, Trude also owned land in Idaho and was regarded to be a pioneer in Idaho recreation. Trude regularly vacationed in Idaho. He first visited Idaho in 1888 on a visit with his wife and his son Daniel, during which he saw Yellowstone Park and various parts of Idaho. He stayed at the ranch of Uncle George Rea, an early white settler of Idaho. He was impressed with the area. He and his wife would visit Idaho every year after. The following year, he traveled through the Jackson Hole area. He built his first Idaho vacation home on the property of Uncle George Rea. Trude bought 4,000 acres (16 km^{2}) of land in Idaho to create his own ranch. His ranch was visited by noted individuals such as William Jennings Bryan, Carter Harrison IV, C. K. G. Billings, William Borah, George Dern, Fred Dubois, and Frank Steunenberg. Trude was also a benefactor of local libraries and charities in the area of Idaho near his ranch, and also funded the construction of a hospital room.

== Personal life ==
Trude was also often known as "A. S. Trude".

Trude married Algenia D. Pearson on April 7, 1868. Together they had five children: sons Alfred Percy, Daniel Pearson, and Walter Scott as well as daughters Algenia and Cecilia Sacre. His son Daniel served as a judge on the Municipal Court of Chicago and Cook County Circuit Court, serving on the bench for 26 years. Trude's eldest son, Alfred Percy, died at the young age of 28 from heart disease.

Trude's brother George served as a judge on the Municipal Court of Chicago, and Chicago city attorney. His nephew Samuel H. Trude served as a judge on the Municipal Court of Chicago from 1914 until 1938.

In 1927, Trude had a stroke while visiting Idaho.

== Death ==
Trude died of a paralytic stroke on December 20, 1933, at age 87 at his Chicago residence. By this time he had been retired from law for several years.

The estate that Trude left behind was valued at $2 million. $500,000 of this was personal property. $1,500,000 of this was realty investments. Realty included,

A half interest in the land on which the [Chicago] City Hall Square building rests, a half interest in another plot in the heart of the LaSalle Street financial district, part of the land beneath Peoples Gas Light and Coke company headquarters at Michigan Avenue and Adams Street, and another plot adjoining the Hotel Sherman.

== In popular culture ==
Trude is included in the novel The Devil in the White City, which deals with Prendergast's murder of Harrison.
