= International Tailoring Company Building =

Coordinates: 41.8777°N 87.6493°W

- U.S. National Register of Historic Places
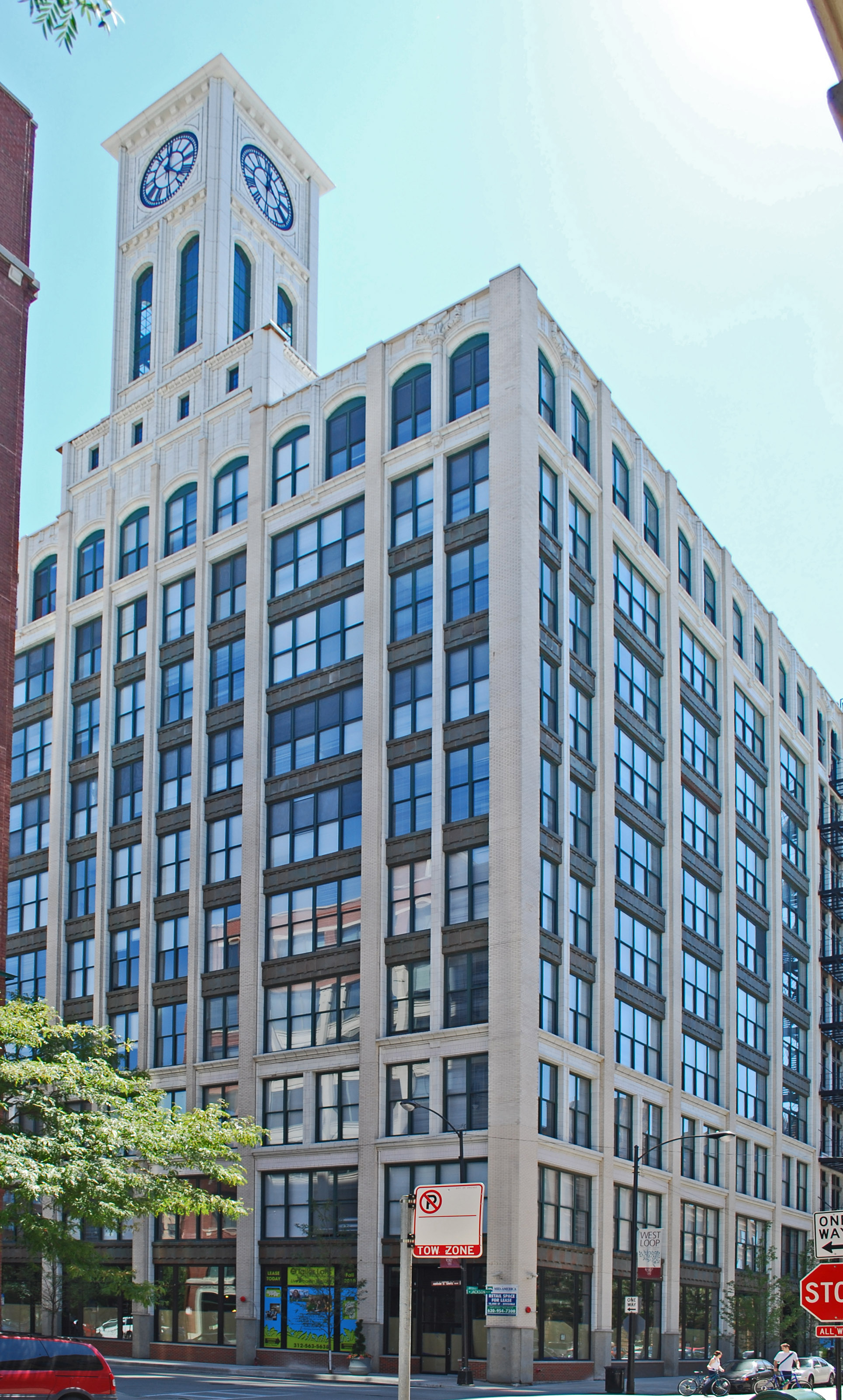
- Interactive map of International Tailoring Company Building
- Location: 847 West Jackson Boulevard, Chicago, Illinois
- Architect: Mundie & Jensen
- NRHP reference No.: 07001474
- Added to NRHP: April 18, 2008

The International Tailoring Company Building, also known as White Tower Building, is a historic building in Chicago that was listed on the National Register on April 18, 2008.

Designed by architects Mundie & Jensen and constructed in 1915–1916, with a substantial addition completed in 1922. In 1915–1916, when the International Tailoring Company built its ten-story building on Jackson Boulevard, it joined a handful of other businesses that since the 1890s had built and operated massive Chicago clothing factories. Established in 1896, the International Tailoring Company and its founder and president Jacob L. Reiss (1874–1955) rode the wave of clothing factory production. Where sweatshops were portrayed as dirty, cramped, dark, and unsafe, the modern clothing factory exemplified by Mundie & Jensen's design for the International Tailoring Company plant was clean, spacious, brightly illuminated by natural light, and constructed with an eye to worker comfort and safety.

It has been used by the School of the Art Institute of Chicago for exhibit space, and, as of 2005 was being converted to residential condos. It is located at 847 W. Jackson Boulevard, which is at the corner of Jackson and Peoria Street, on the historic U.S. Route 66.
