= Patrick Eugene Prendergast =

Irish-American assassin (1868–1894)

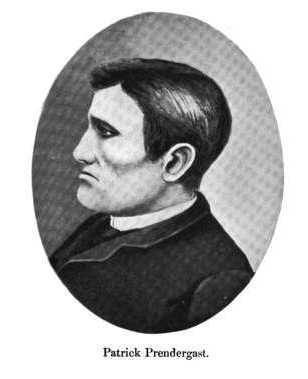
- Born: April 6, 1868; Inishbofin, Ireland
- Died: July 13, 1894 (aged 26); Cook County Jail, Illinois, United States
- Occupation: Newspaper distributor
- Political party: Democratic
- Status: Executed by hanging
- Conviction: Murder
- Penalty: Death

Patrick Eugene Joseph Prendergast (6 April 1868 – 13 July 1894) was an Irish-born American newspaper distributor who assassinated Chicago Mayor Carter Harrison III, fatally shooting the five-term mayor on October 28, 1893. Following a murder trial and a subsequent proceeding in which the defense tried unsuccessfully to have him acquitted by reason of insanity, Prendergast was ultimately found guilty and sentenced to death for the assassination. He was executed by hanging on July 13, 1894, the only client of famed attorney Clarence Darrow to ever receive the death penalty.

== Early life ==
Prendergast was born on 6 April 1868 in Cloonamore townland, Inishbofin, an island off the west coast of Ireland. He was baptised in St Colman's Church on 12 April 1868. His parents were Ellen King and Patrick Prendergast, both of whom were described as teachers at their marriage in Inishbofin on 2 July 1865. His grandfather, William Prendergast, who lost an arm in Pamplona, was an army pensioner who was reported to have died insane. His mother had "repeated attacks of hysterics" and his father died of consumption.

Prendergast was reported to have suffered a severe head injury from a fall at the age of four, from which he was unconscious for a long period of time and suffered vomiting for four weeks after. He was described as a peculiar child, solitary, irritable and excitable, with a poor memory who did poorly in school. Patrick arrived in New York on 20 May 1873, aged 5, traveling with his brother John, aged 8, on the SS France. In Chicago, he attended several Catholic schools, including St. Patrick's Academy. He left home at the age of 16 because of imaginary persecution. He first left home for two weeks. After returning home, he briefly attended the Holy Name School. He soon dropped out of school and took a job as a Western Union messenger, in order to supplement the low income that his father brought home. However, he soon found himself in what he believed to be a state of decline, and left home for twelve weeks. During this time, he stayed in New Mexico. After this time, he returned home looking disheveled. He thereafter took jobs at the Chicago Globe and Chicago Inter Ocean.

At the age of seventeen, he became more socially withdrawn, and began refusing to share a room at night with his brother. He also became obsessed with the writings of Henry George. By the age of 18, he had fully developed grandiose views of his own capabilities and had fully become a fanatic for the single-tax ideology promoted by George.

Prendergast became a newspaper distributor in Chicago, where he lobbied for improvements in Chicago's railroad grade crossings, which he saw as a danger to the public. He supported Carter Harrison's 1890s election campaigns under the delusion that if Harrison won the election, Prendergast himself would receive an appointment as the city's corporation counsel. Prendergast had a fixation with writing postcards. In order to support Carter Harrison's pursuit to regain the mayoralty, Prendergast sent rambling postcards to prominent Chicagoans urging them to vote for Harrison. Among those who received such a postcard was prominent lawyer A. S. Trude, who would later prosecute the case against Prendergast in the murder trial that followed the assassination. Prendergast sent these postcards in support of Harrison for more than two years before Harrison was successful in winning the 1893 Chicago mayoral election. Prendergast believed that his letters had been responsible for Harrison's success in the election.

From some time in 1893 until July of that year, Prendergast disappeared for an extended time without notice, possibly in a dissociative fugue. He offered little account of where he had been, other than a vague statement about having been in Wisconsin.

In approximately mid-1893, Prendergast visited Chicago City Hall under the delusion that he had been appointed corporation counsel by Harrison. After Prendergast was insistent to a clerk that he held the position, he was brought to meet Adolph Kraus, the incumbent corporation counsel, who showed Prendergast his office and teased him by facetiously asking if he wanted the job. While Prendergast did not have the education or qualifications that required for the office, he was nevertheless angered that he had not been appointed by Harrison to it. After Harrison had spent six months in office without appointing him corporation counsel or granting him any recognition, Prendergast began to desire revenge against Harrison for the perceived slight. Prendergast also wrote threatening letters to both Harrison and Kraus, a fact which was quickly discovered by investigators following the assassination. One letter to Kraus read, "I want your job. Do not be a fool. Resign. Third and final notice."

== Assassination of Mayor Harrison ==
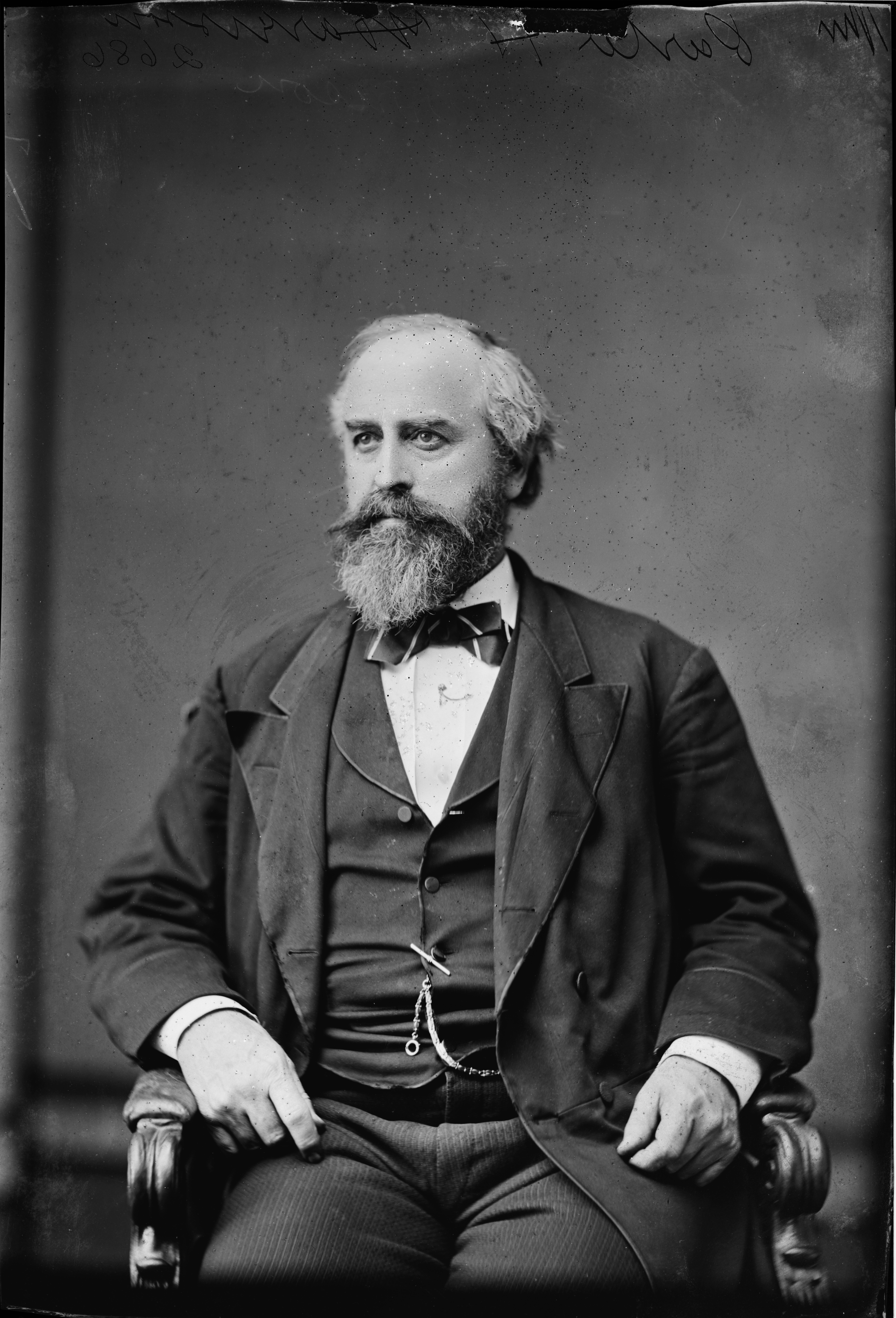
Carter H. Harrison III, five-term mayor of Chicago

When the appointment did not come, Prendergast visited Harrison at his home on October 28, 1893, ringing the doorbell at 7:50 p.m. He was admitted by a maid who went to wake the mayor, who was taking a nap on a sofa in the parlor. As Harrison stepped into the hallway from the parlor, Prendergast approached and shot the mayor three times with a .38 revolver, hitting him first in the abdomen above the navel, a second time under the left arm with a shot that pierced his heart, and a third time at point-blank range through the left hand.

Harrison's coachman, hearing the gunfire, ran towards the site of the shooting with a pistol of his own, firing three times at the escaping Prendergast without hitting him, while avoiding being hit when Prendergast returned fire. Mortally wounded, Harrison died in his home at 8:25 p.m.

The escaping assassin was chased down Ashland Avenue by several citizens and a police officer, who ran after him to the Des Plaines Street police station, where Prendergast immediately surrendered. He still had the gun in his possession. When interviewed by police, he gave varying stories as to his motive, including the failed appointment and the mayor's failure to elevate train track crossings. The smell of burned powder and the revolver's empty chambers reaffirmed to the police department that Prendergast was telling the truth.

Prendergast was taken from the Des Plaines Street station to the Central Station, located downtown, where the building was quickly surrounded by a crowd of 5,000 people. Fearing potential mob violence, at 11:15 p.m., Prendergast was stealthily hurried into a wagon and taken to another station located on the North Side of the city, where he was lodged in the county jail pending trial.

== Trial and appeals ==
Newspaper illustration of Prendergast during his trial

In his murder trial, Prendergast's attorney tried to have him declared insane. Chicago lawyers disagreed, as Prendergast had taken special care to keep an empty chamber in his revolver as he carried it around. This demonstrated rationality because carrying a revolver of that era with a live round under the hammer could cause it to go off if dropped; having the forethought to leave the chamber safely empty demonstrated sanity. Modern revolvers have safety features to prevent such accidental discharges. Several doctors testified that while Prendergast was paranoid, he knew right from wrong and was capable of standing trial for the murder. He was sentenced to be executed. A team of attorneys led by Clarence Darrow succeeding in getting granted a hearing on whether Prendergast's current state of sanity precluded him from being executed, but the defense also failed in this additional proceeding and Prendergast was found in sufficient mental condition to be executed.

== Execution ==
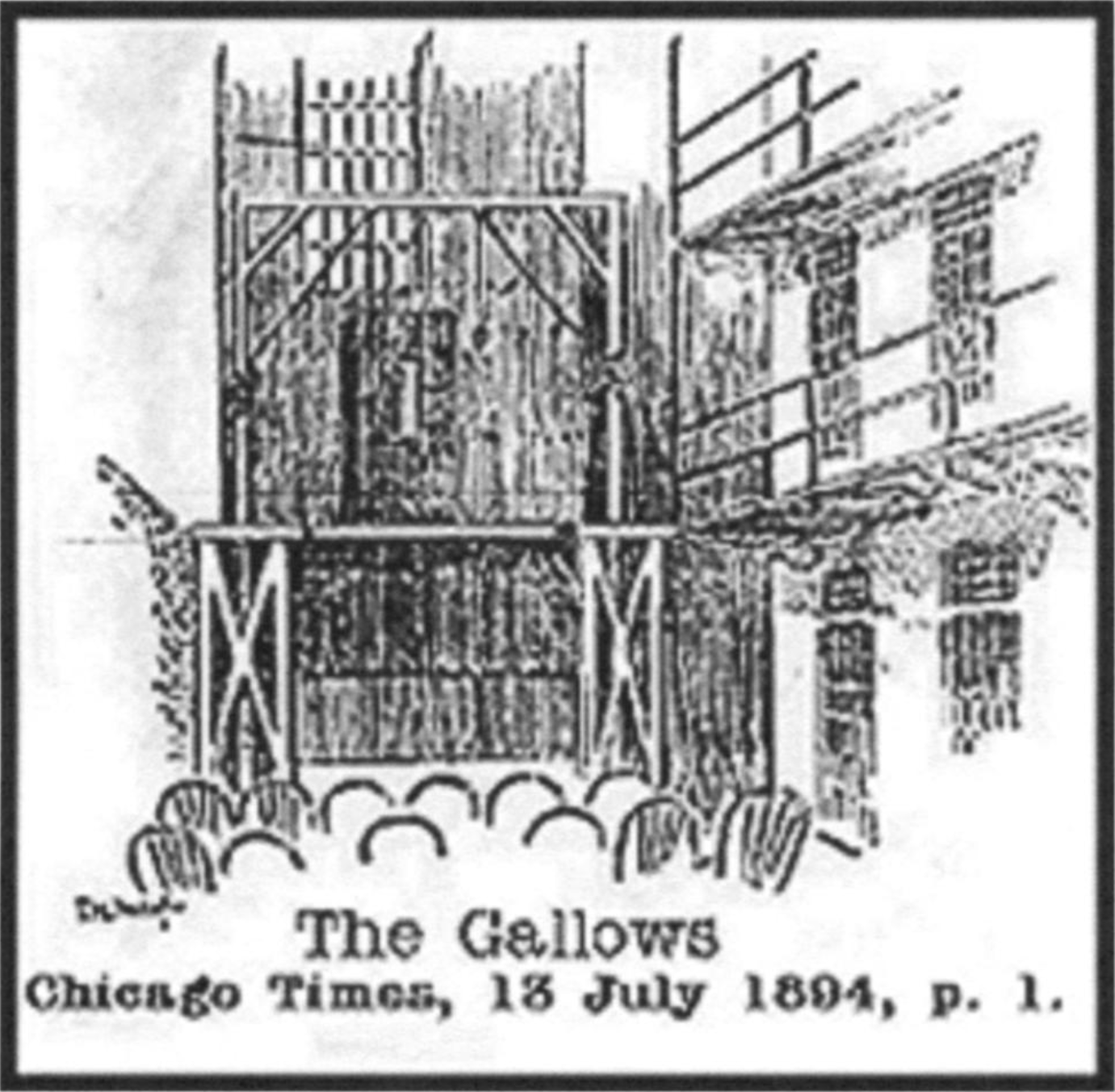
Illustration of the gallows in which Prendergast was hanged

Prendergast was hanged on July 13, 1894. At 10 AM that morning, James H. Gilbert (sheriff of Cook County) came to the room where Prendergast had been held under guard since the previous night and read him the warrant for his execution. He was visited one last time by his brother John at 11 a.m., by which time hope for a last-minute reprieve from Governor Altgeld had dissipated. He was visited by a doctor at 11:30 and spent a brief time with a priest, declaring that there had been no malice in the killing of Mayor Harrison. Five minutes before his scheduled 11:45 execution, Stephen S. Gregory (one of Prendergast's attorneys) arrived and was allowed to shake his client's hand one last time and exchange a few words with him.

A gallows had been constructed in the north corridor of the jail and seats placed between the row of cells along the north side and the high building wall of the Criminal Courts Building. Precaution was taken so that the apparatus would not malfunction, with the gallows being tested and inspected. Only six months prior, an incident had occurred in Chicago where an execution was botched in a macabre manner that distressed some witnesses to the point of vomiting and fainting: the execution of murderer George H. Palmer had failed when the rope broke on the first attempt, and Palmer had to be hanged a second time to complete the execution.

About 500 ticketed witnesses assembled to watch the execution, which included the members of the jury which convicted Prendergast. Prisoners whose cells faced the corridor where the gallows were erected were removed from their cells at 11:00 AM and brought to a location where the execution would not be visible to them. At 11:11, attendees were instructed to extinguish any cigars. At 11:43, the Cook County sheriff gave an order for Prendergast to be escorted to the gallows. He was then escorted by a number of deputy sheriffs and corrections officers. Also escorting Prendergast was Father Berry of the Cathedral of the Holy Name, who was on hand to administer the last rites of the Catholic Church. A minute later, Prendergast arrived in the area where the gallows had been constructed.

When he got to the top of the platform, Prendergast briefly raised his hands, recognizing the crowd that gathered to view his execution. Prendergast walked to the edge of the trap without assistance, where his hands were fastened. Although having previously planned to make a last statement to the crowd, he had been dissuaded by Father Berry, to whom he quietly delivered his last words, "I had no malice against anyone."

The Chicago Daily News reported,

Great drops of perspiration glistened on [Prendgergast's] forehead, and he was white as the robe he wore. But he did not break down, by shutting his teeth tightly together so that his under jaw rigidly protruded, he awaited the end.

Prendergast's feet, knees, and chest were bound with straps and a white shroud placed over him and he was taken onto the trap, where the noose was placed around his neck. A white muslin hood was placed over his head and the noose, obscuring both from view.

A signal was given and at 11:48 the rope holding the heavy trap in place was cut. Prendergast's neck was broken by the six-foot drop and his body did not move after the fall. His pulse was taken several times. Before the hanging, his pulse stood at 120 beats per minute (BPM). Prendergast's heart continued to beat for about ten minutes after the trap was released. It decreased to 58 BPM within a minute after the trap was released, but rose to 100 the second minute, 148 the third minute, 160 the fourth minute, before declining gradually thereafter to 100 BPM in the eighth minute. It stopped some time before the twelfth minute. Five minutes later his body was taken down and placed in an awaiting coffin for burial.

The Chicago Daily News reported,

Prendergast retained his nerve to the end and approached his doom without faltering. He made no dying speech on the scaffold and not a word was spoken from the time he stopped on the trap until the end. The drop fell at 11:47 [AM] and the body was cut down at 11:58.

At 12:30 PM, Prendergast's hearse containing the coffin departed from the jail. He was buried at Calvary Cemetery in Evanston, Illinois in an unmarked grave located next to his father's grave.

== Media depictions ==
On occasion, Prendergast has been represented in film or fiction. In the 1991 made-for-TV movie Darrow, he was portrayed by New York-born actor Paul Klementowicz. Prendergast's story is one of the subplots in Erik Larson's 2003 best-selling non-fiction book The Devil in the White City. Patrick was also referenced in Watch Dogs during a city hotspot checkin in which you can visit the police station and briefly read about it.

== See also ==
- Charles Guiteau, assassin of President James Garfield with similar motives

== Bibliography ==
- Larson, Erik, The Devil in the White City, Crown Publishers, New York, 2003.
