= Sanity proceeding for Patrick Eugene Prendergast =

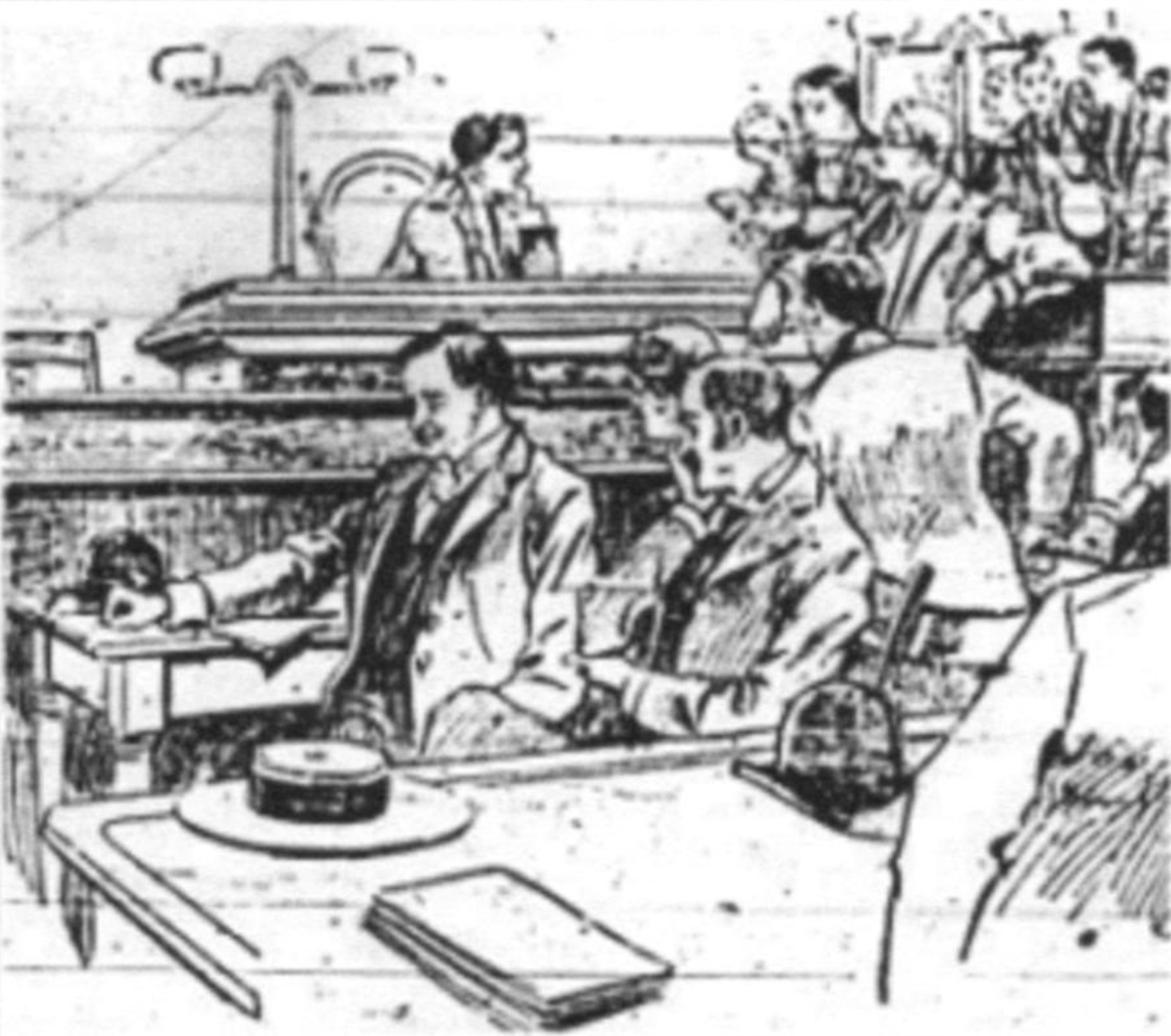
- Illustration of lead defense counsel Clarence Darrow and others hearing the delivery of the final verdict of the proceeding
- Court: Cook County Criminal Court
- Started: June 20, 1894
- Decided: July 3, 1894
- Verdict: Jury found Prendergast sane, meaning that was permissible for him to be executed

Court membership
- Judge sitting: John Barton Payne (of the Superior Court of Cook County)

After Patrick Eugene Prendergast was convicted of murder in his trial for the assassination of Carter Harrison III and sentenced to death by hanging, a hearing was granted to determine whether Prendergast was experiencing a current state of insanity that (under state statute) would have precluded the state from carrying out his execution. Prendergast was represented by Clarence Darrow, Stephen S. Gregory, and James S. Harlan. Despite Darrow offering a passionate representation of Prendergast, arguing for the jury to find him insane, the jury judged Prendergast to be sane and he was executed soon after.

Prendergast's rerpesentation was an early case in the career of Darrow, who is held by some legal scholars to have been the greatest lawyer of the 20th century. It is rare in his career for its verdict having been a complete and unambiguous defeat of Darrow's position, and was the only instance in which a client that Darrow defended was executed.

== Background ==
=== Prendergast ===
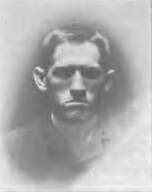
Image of Prendergast

Patrick Eugene Prendergast had family history of mental illness, and had exhibited mental troubles in his pre-adulthood. During his adulthood, he exhibited much behavior that appeared indicative of mental troubles.

=== Assassination of Carter Harrison III ===
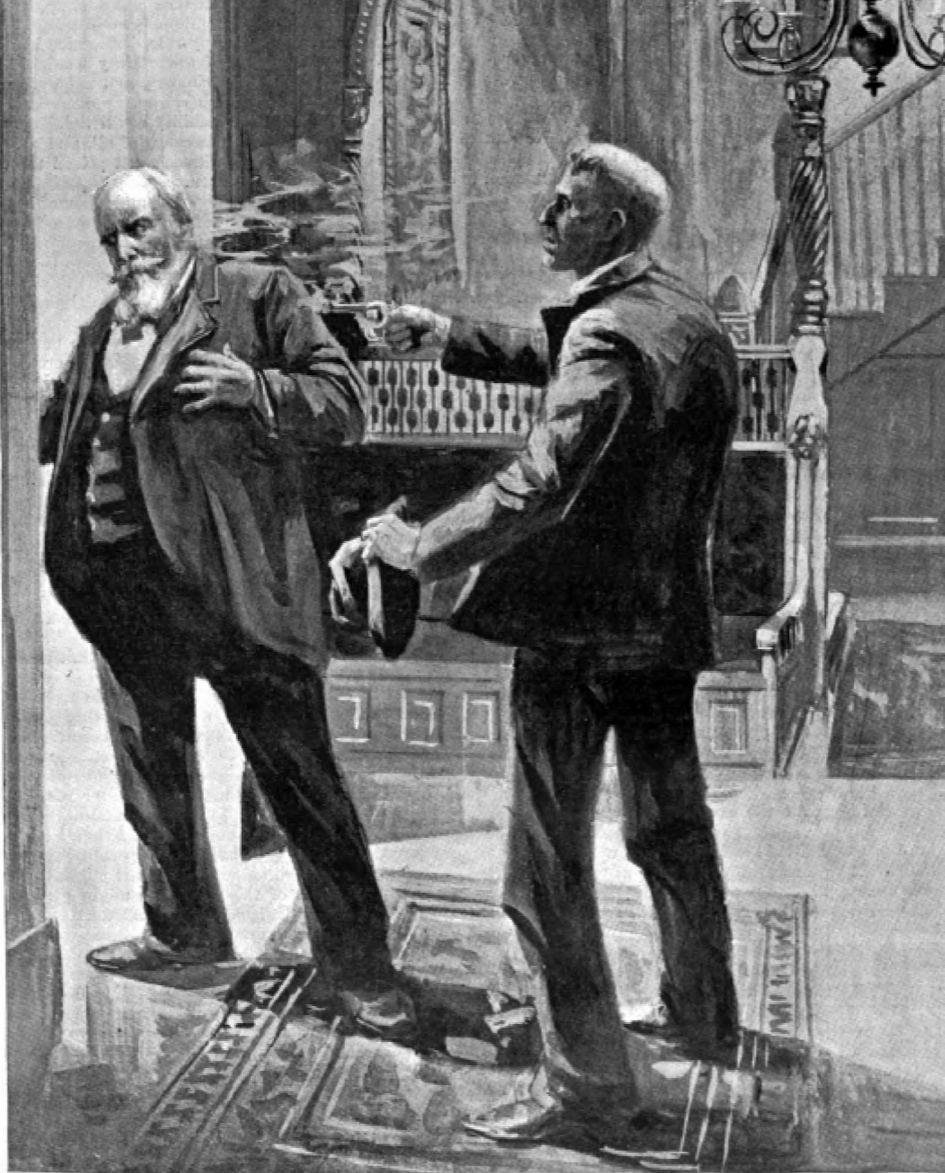
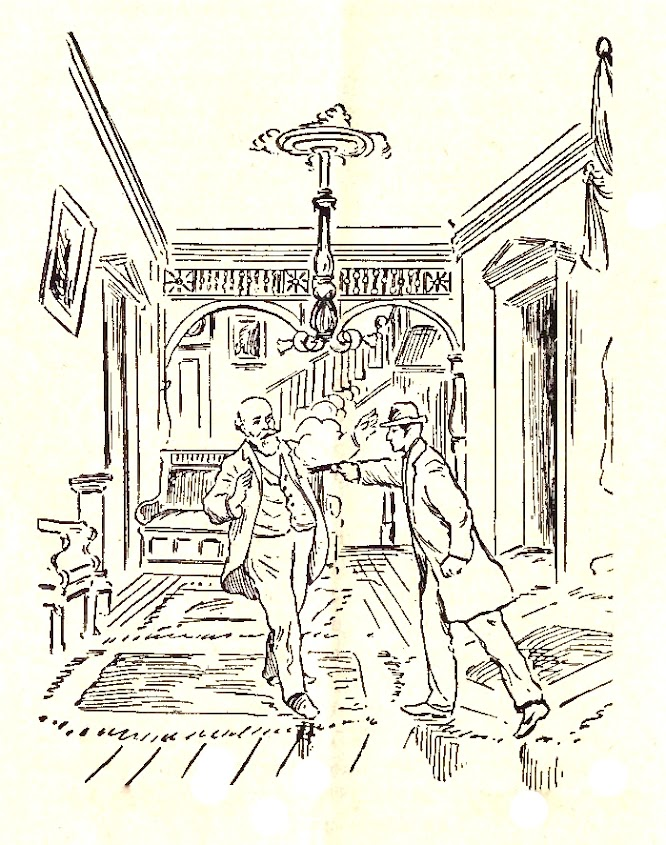
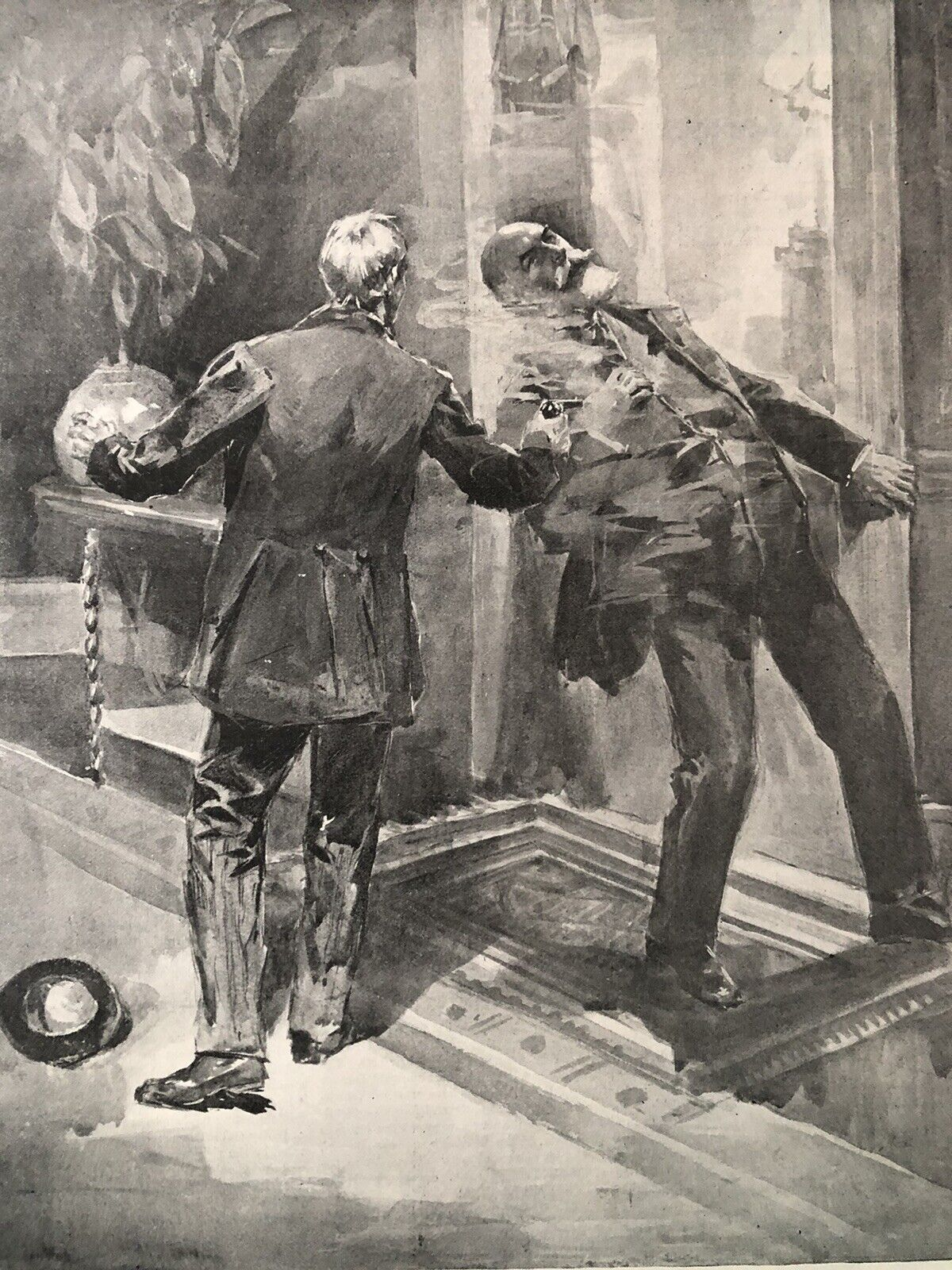
Contemporary illustrations of the assassination

Prendergast held delusions that his support of Carter Harrison III (mayor of Chicago) had been the decisive factor in Harrison's victory in Chicago's 1893 mayoral election, and that he would be appointed the city's corporation counsel by Harrison as a reward. Prendergast, who had no legal education or experience, believed that he was entitled to appointment to that office, and that it was important he be appointed so that he could undertake work to grade separate railroad tracks in the city (an issue which was a fixation of his).

Prendergrast grew upset at Harrison for having not appointed him to the office. October 28, 1893, Prendergast visited the mayor at his home on October 28, 1893, and killed him with three gunshots from a .38 revolver. Prendergast fled by foot, but soon surrendered himself at a police station.

Harrison's assassination (only two days prior to the scheduled close of the World's Columbian Exposition in Chicago, and only two weeks before his scheduled wedding) was met with a significant national reaction, and was one of the most sensationalized events in then-recent memory. Media reports in the days immediately after the assassination questioned Prendergast's sanity. Initially, the public viewed Prendergast as a mentally troubled individual. However, as more about his background was learned, the public began to view him more as an angered egomaniac that had killed as an act of revenge.

=== Murder trial and conviction ===
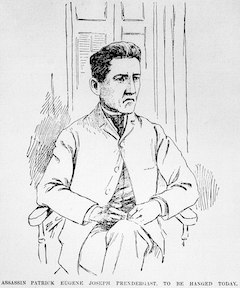
Illustration of Prendergast during the murder trial

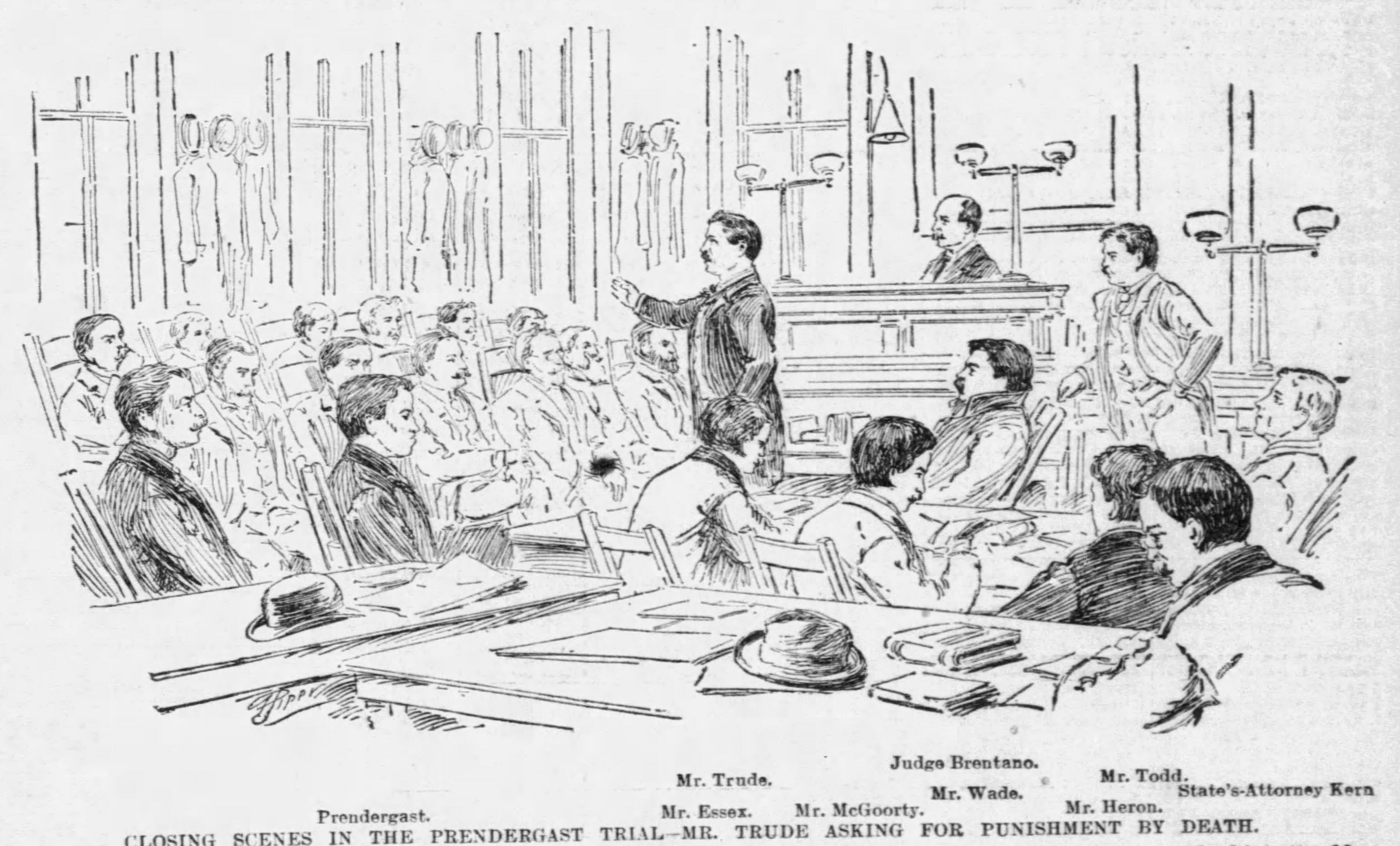
Illustration of the courtroom scene during the murder trial as prosecuting attorney A. S. Trude asks for the death penalty to be imposed

Prendergast was tried for murder in the first degree. His attorneys argued an insanity defense. In the trial, Prendergast was represented by court-appointed attorneys Robert Essex and Richard A. Wade, as well as private counsel John T. McGoorty and John Heron (the two of whom had been hired by Prendergast's brother, John Prendergast). The trial lasted three weeks (from opening remarks to sentencing). On December 29, 1893, after quick deliberation the jury delivered a guilty verdict and sentenced Prendergast to death by hanging. His execution was scheduled for March 23.

Prendergast's attorneys motioned for a new trial, citing errors "in admitting incompetent and improper evidence," as well as claiming that testimony that was allowed during the arraignment about Prendergast's conduct had amounted to compelling Prendergast to "give evidence against himself," in violation of the Fifth Amendment to the Constitution of the United States. Judge Brentano considered the motion. On February 24, Brentano denied the motion, sentencing Prendergast to execution on March 23, 1894.

== Attorneys ==
=== Defense (Prendergast) ===
Images of attorneys for the defense:
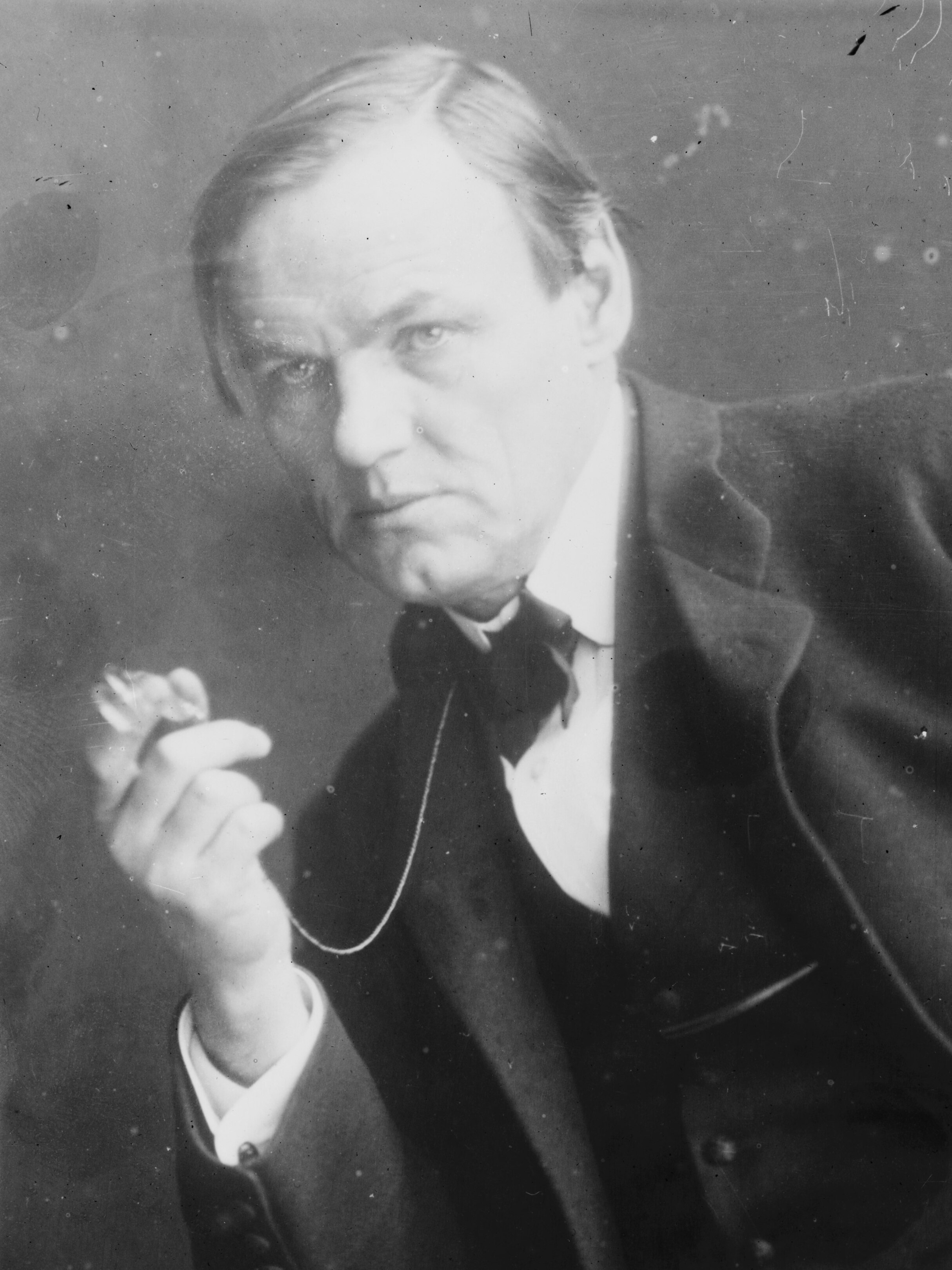
Clarence Darrow (photographed in 1900), lead defense counsel

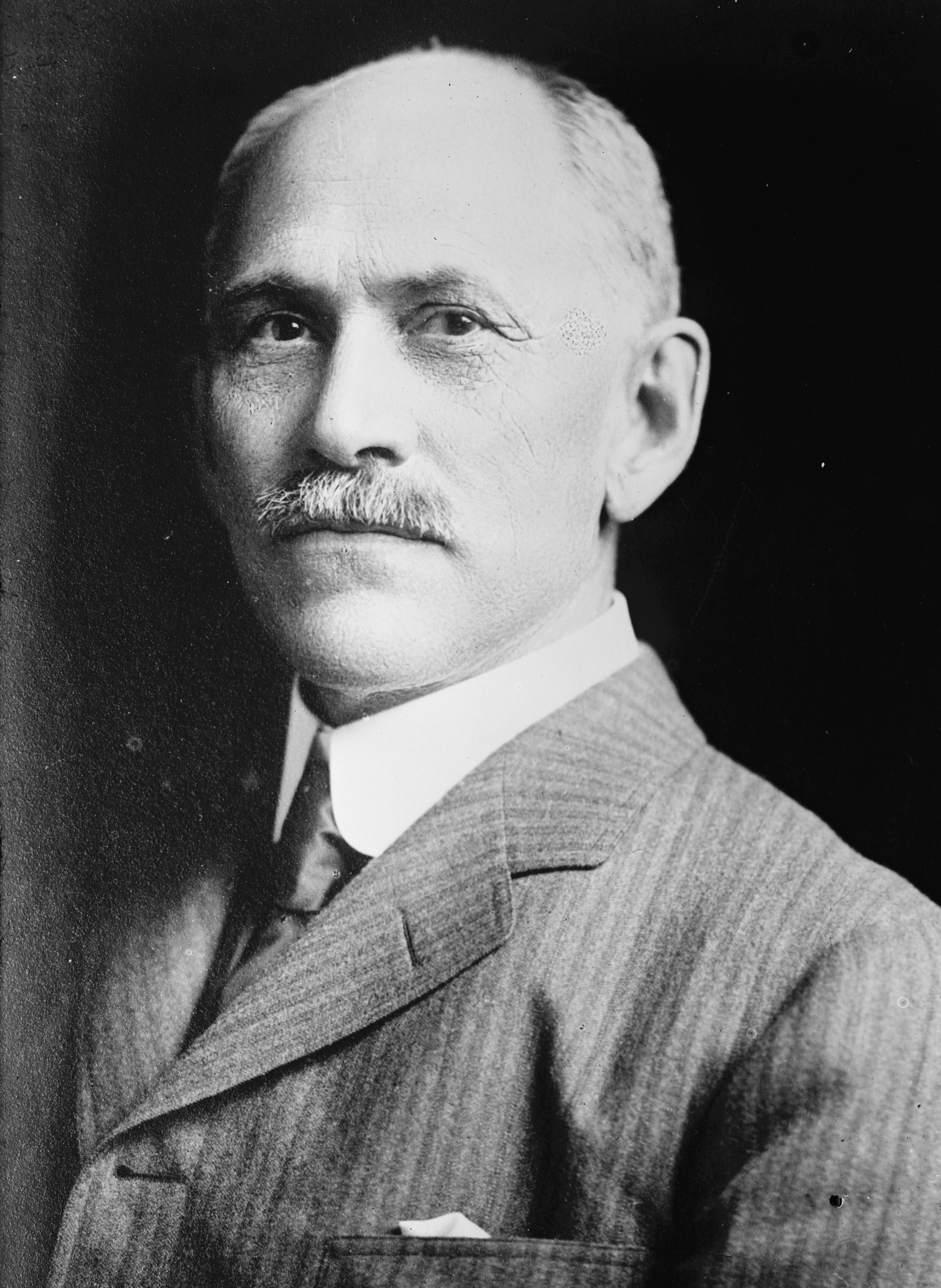
Stephen S. Gregory (photographed in 1920)

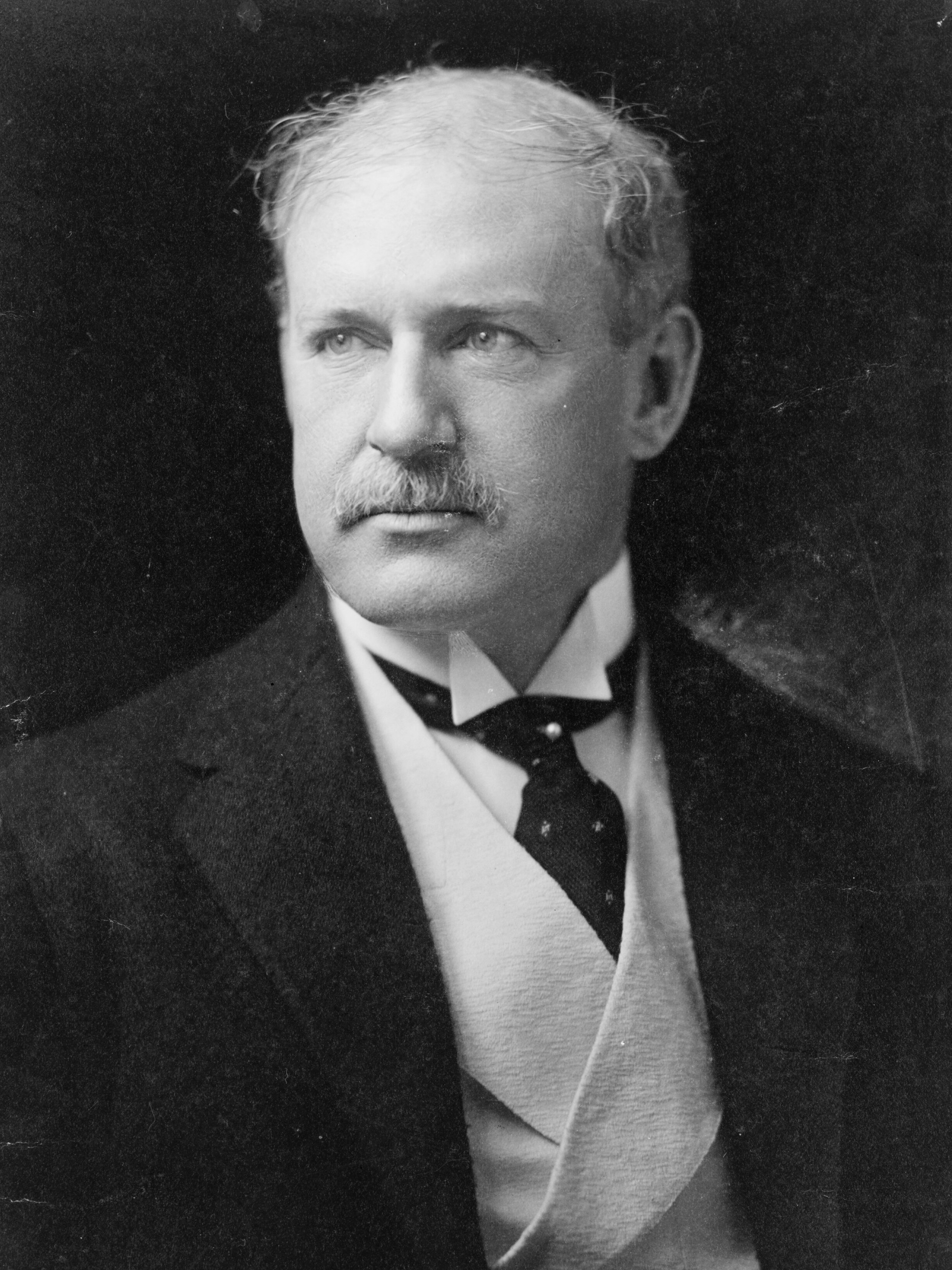
James S. Harlan (photographed in 1904)

By some time in May, (Note: while it is not clear the exact date when Darrow involved himself in the matter of Prendergast's defense, an article in The New York Times supports that Darrow had involved himself as early as February 1894 in the defense, reporting that Darrow had by February 20 become junior counsel for the defense, and on that date had spoken before the court as part of the defense's arguments to support their motion for a new trial) Wade departed from representing Prengergast's defense and Clarence Darrow had become Prendergast's primary counsel. Darrow had months earlier left his position as the city's assistant corporation counsel. This was his first murder case, and marked the start of a storied criminal law career for him. Joining Darrow in his representation of Prendergast was James S. Harlan and Stephen S. Gregory. Heron retained some involvement in the case (assisting Darrow) through at least through June 15. Darrow was among Chicago's most boisterous opponents of capital punishment (the death sentence) but had never before represented a defendant in a murder case. Representing the Prendergast case has described as a "major coup" in his burgeoning legal career, despite the negative outcome of the trial.

=== State (prosecution) ===
A. S. Trude, who had been lead prosecutor in the murder trial, continued in that role. Prendergast's attorneys had objected to Trude continuing to represent the state, but the judge allowed him to. Trude's primary work as a lawyer had been in defending newspapers in lawsuits relating to libel claims. Trude had some prosecutorial experience, prosecuting cases on behalf of the Chicago city government during the mayoralty of Joseph Medill in the 1870s.

Assistant state's attorneys James Todd and Morrison also represented the state. Todd had also participated in the prosecution during Prendergast's murder trial. Todd had years earlier graduated from the Chicago College of Law in 1890, and had been hired to his position as an assistant state's attorney in February 1893. By the time of Prendergast's murder trial, he had prosecuted twenty murder cases, winning nineteen convictions to one acquittal.

Images of attorneys for the state:
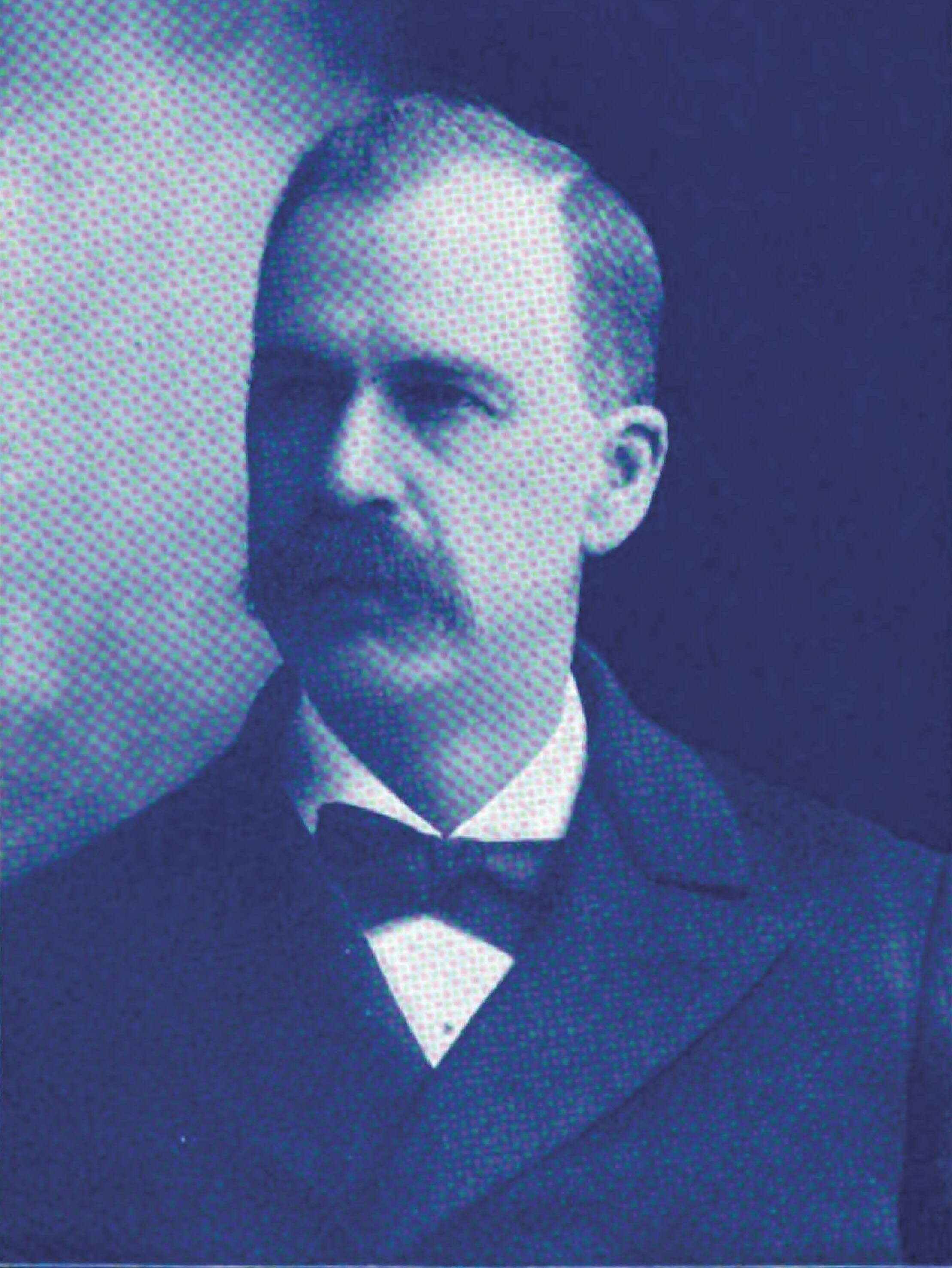
A. S. Trude, lead prosecutor

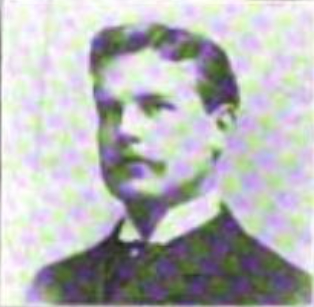
James Todd, assistant state's attorney

== Motion for a proceeding, stay of execution, pretrial ==
Also on March 22, Prendergast's brother filed a petition on Prendergast's behalf citing Illinois' section 285 of the (then-current) Illinois Criminal Code, which barred the trial or execution of individuals who become "lunatic or insane" after the commission of a crime for as long as the remain in such a mental state. If he were to be deemed insane, this would forbid Prendergast's death sentence from being carried out until such a point that he would be deemed sane. The statute required a sanity hearing to take place if it appeared that the condemned may have become insane since the verdict sentencing them to death had been delivered.

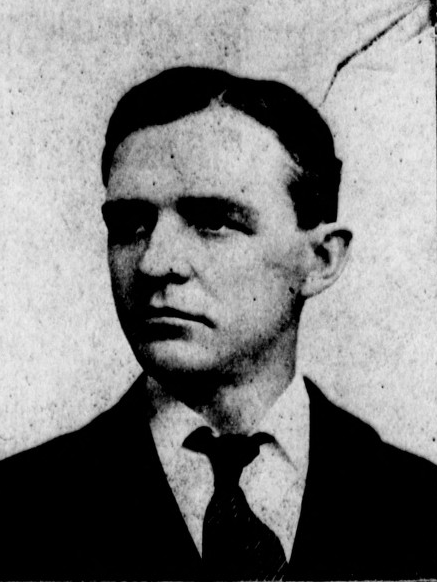
Judge John Barton Payne (pictured, in 1910) presided over the insanity inquiry proceeding

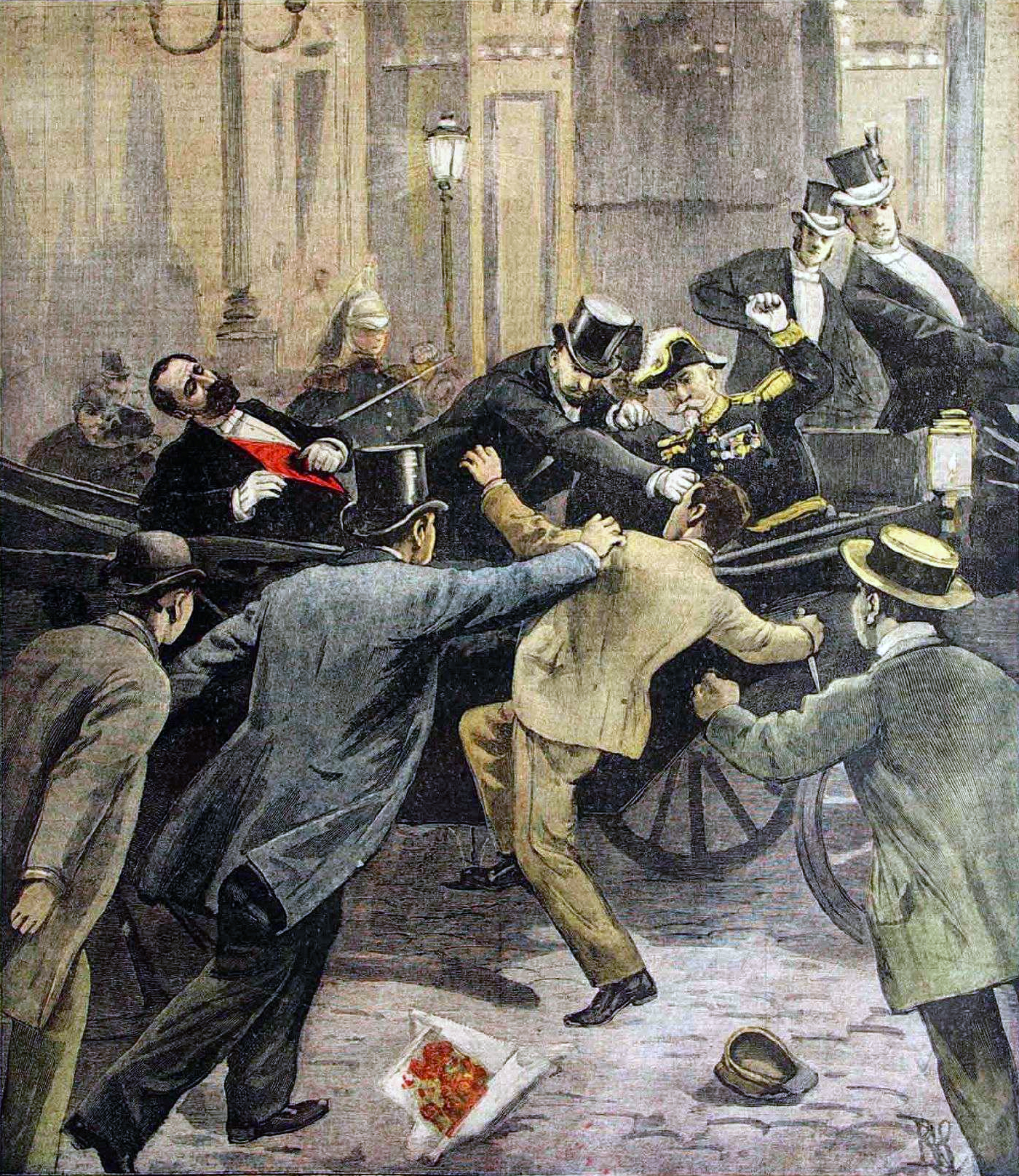
The assassination of French president Sadi Carnot (illustrated above) brought renewed interest in Prendergast's legal proceedings

Prendergast's new defense team (attorneys Darrow, Gregory, and Harlan) were attempting various avenues to prevent his scheduled execution from going forward as scheduled on March 23. While Darrow lobbied for a pardon, Gregory and Harlan searched to find a judge who would entertain a motion on the basis of John Prendergast's affidavit attesting that he had observed his brother to be currently insane. Late on the evening of March 22, sitting in the Cook County Criminal Court, Judge Arthur H. Chetlain ordered a two-week reprieve ordering a stay of execution until April 4. He further issued a de lunatico inquirendo –a writ which ordered for an inquiry to be held in which a jury would rule as to whether or not Prendergast was currently insane. Current insanity would make him ineligible to be executed. This move by Chetlain was highly unexpected, and he faced tremendous backlash for issuing the reprieve. Chetlain had previously been the law partner of Stephen Gregory, one of Pendergast's attorneys. Chetlain was accused of philandering and having exceeded his judicial authority. Trude, attorney for the state, objected to Chetlain continuing to preside over the matter and the judge recused himself from the matter. After his refusal, the case was given to Judge John Barton Payne.

Delays arose, with the execution being further stayed until July 2. In May, a stipulation was presented to Payne in which it would have been agreed to postpone the trial to the court's September term and further stay the execution until November. However, Payne rejected this and set a start date of June 20 for the trial.

The sanity proceeding began on June 20, and were ultimately concluded on July 3. Since the trial was not concluded in time for a June 2 execution, the execution received an additional stay until July 13.

The proceedings received renewed public interest after French president Sadi Carnot was assassinated on June 24 (during the course of the trial). Many had already been concerned after Harrison's assassination that it was part of a perceived trend of violent crimes being committed against officials, with other examples in then-recent years including the assassination of U.S. president James A. Garfield and the assassination of Russian Tsar Alexander II (both in 1881).

== Opening statements ==
Gregory gave the defense's opening statement, in which he promised the jury that expert testimony they would present from professionals would convincingly demonstrate that Prendergast was insane. In the state's opening statement, Trude cautioned the jury against lending too much weight to expert testimony on a case regarding insanity, arguing that the testimony of "plain, honest, unprofessional people" was superior in establishing whether one was insane or not.

At the start of his presentation, Darrow highlighted characteristics that he asserted demonstrated Prendergast's insanity. He argued that Prendergast had already exhibited mental disability prior to his incarceration, and that his mental state had worsened since his incarceration. He characterized Prendergast as irrational, pointing to his behavior. Darrow noted that, while incarcerated, Prendergast had written strange letters to notable figures both from Chicago and throughout the United States. Among such messages were requests written to single-tax advocate and Baltimore-based Catholic Church figure Cardinal James Gibbons asking each to testify at his trial. He characterized Prendergast's hyperfixation on various issues (single-tax, the gold standard, railroad grade crossings) as behavior of an irrational mind. Particularly since Prendergast had at times claimed that such issues were his motivations for shooting Harrison.

== Presentations ==
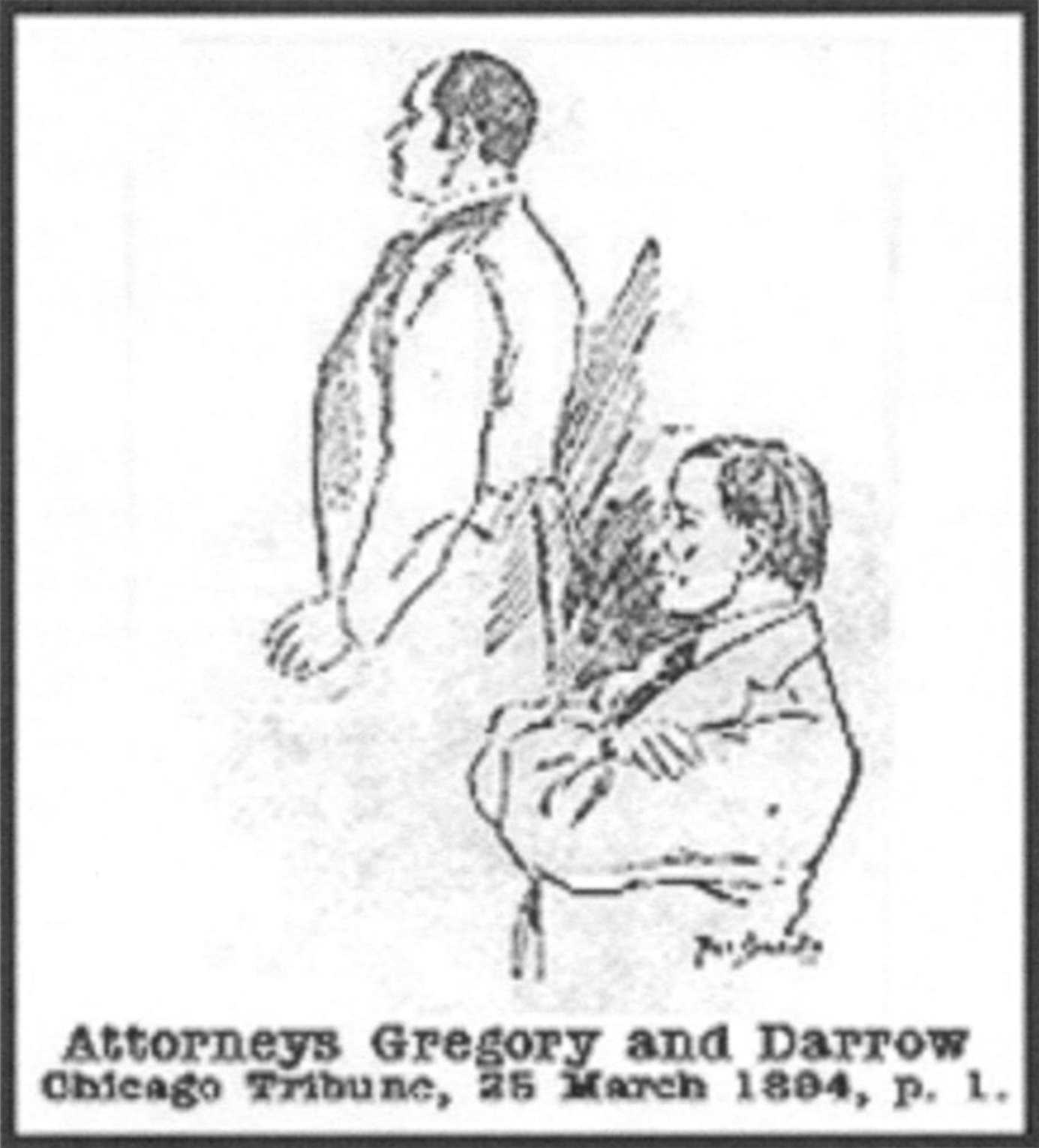
Illustration of Stephen S. Gregory and Clarence Darrow, attorneys for Prendergast

Since specialized fields of psychiatry and psychology had not yet been properly established, and because nonprofessionals were held by courts as permissible expert witnesses, a mere "common sense" view of sanity could be admitted by those who were relative non-experts on the subject as being "expert opinion". The state's lawyers argued to the jury that "common sense" opinions their witnesses presented could properly determine the sanity of Prendergast. The state's witnesses were primarily relatively undistinguished medical doctors and jailers under whose supervision Prendergast had stayed while at the Cook County Jail.

Darrow called into question the expertise behind the opinions of the medical professionals providing the prosecution's expert testimony. He criticized the age of one doctor (an octogenarian that he characterized as a, "relic of a forgotten age"), called into question the skills of a former doctor (characterizing him as having skill akin to a "butcher"). He also pointed out that the state had decided not to call a previously-considered expert witness after he had come to the conclusion that Prendergast was insane.

Darrow told the jury, "you have been asked [by the prosecution] to ignore all the learning and science of the past. You have been asked to forget all the humanity of civilization which the years of progress and enlightenment have given the world. You have been asked to do this all for the sake of giving the law a victim." He presented the jury with the rhetorical pondering, "[were] the state so interested in taking a life that lawyers should travel beyond the truth and beyond the record and beg the jury to violate their oaths for the sake of giving justice a victim?"

Darrow put up a stronger and more boisterous defense than Prendergast had been given in his murder trial. Richard Allen Morton has written,

Unlike the first trial, where Trude had overwhelmed the defense, Darrow was not intimidated and fought and objected at every point, often to the judge's irritation. He was so vigorous in this regard that he might be trying to lay the groundwork for a possible appeal. Also adding to the rising emotion of the trial were frequent, apparently irrational, punctuations by Prendergast himself, which the newspapers dismissed once again as merely role-playing.

== Harlan's closing argument for the defense ==
The closing arguments for the proceeding were delivered on July 2, 1894. Each side was allotted 3.5 hours of argument. The closing arguments saw each side given a total of three-and-a-half hours to speak. The state's argument was sandwiched between the two-halves of the defense's closing arguments. Harlan gave the first portion of the defense closing argument.

== State's closing argument ==
Todd and Morison gave the prosecution's closing argument.

Todd told the jury that the state was not seeking to be a, "suppliant for mercy," but rather was, "demanding that justice be done."

Todd and Morrison each purported to the jury that they would not use emotional pleas, but nevertheless sought to evoke heavy emotional responses. Todd told the jury,

We are not here for the purpose of presenting for you, the sickening spectacle of the chief executive of this city shot down at the very threshold of his house, with a bride to be weeping over the prostrate body. We are not here to speak of the concourse of people following with silent step the departed mayor to his grave.

Morrison told the jury,

I am not permitted to picture before you the murdered mayor, who in response to the ringing of his door-bell, upon that fatal night of the 28th of October, living in the full peace of the people, in a community where he was universally beloved and respected, goes forward to meet the stranger and meets his death. In his own home, that he loved so well, shot down like a dog by a man whom all the evidence shows, by a man whom your own judgment, as you have seen him here, knew full well the nature of the act, and had the power at that time to refrain from doing it.

He urged (Note: "Mr. Darrow will refer to the widowed mother, and the brother of this prisoner, and tug at your heart-strings, that your sympathies may be aroused and overwhelm your judgment. He will picture to you the scene of a heart-broken, widowed mother, and the discouraged brother. All of that Mr. Darrow is exceedingly able to do. In that lies their only hope in this case, that the administration of the law shall be defeated....Mind you, gentlemen, when I anticipate these arguments it is because nothing has been suggested in the opening argument of Mr. Harlan, but I have reason to believe that this will all be covered by Mr. Darrow when he comes to address you, and he has the closing argument in this case and I am not permitted to reply to it, and that is the reason I refer to it now.") the jury against listening to emotional pleas that Darrow would make. At the conclusion of the state's closing argument, Morrison argued,

There has been no change in [Prendergast's] condition since the twenty-fourth day of February last. He is mentally fit and responsible, not only for his crime, but mentally fit to prepare himself for the doom which his crime so deservedly merits.

== Darrow's closing argument for the defense ==
Harlan gave the first portion of the defense's closing argument and Darrow gave the final portion of the defense's closing argument.

In his portion of the closing argument, Darrow gave a very strong performance that was acted as the zenith of the defense's case. Delivering what Brand Whitlock described at the time as the, "most eloquent appeal for mercy," he had heard. Darrow spoke for approximately an hour straight on July 2.

=== Prefacing comments ===
Darrow prefaced his portion of the defense's closing argument by declaring,

It is not often that I take part in a criminal case. Before engaging in the present trial I had supposed there were certain tried standards which the ethics of the profession had enjoined upon prosecutors that should be followed by honorable men. I had never believed that the State was so interested in taking the blood of any human being that lawyers should travel beyond the truth and beyond the record and beg the jury to violate their oath for the sake of giving justice a victim, as these gentlemen put it.

=== Cautioning for a narrow scope of evidence weighed ===
Darrow repeatedly cautioned the jury not to rely on the outcome of the first trial, nor even to consider the murder of Harrison. He argued that this would betray the oath they had taken in this trial. He insisted that they were obligated to instead focus solely on the question of whether Prendergast was currently insane, as the proceeding was merely to determine as to whether Prendergast had become insane following his murder trial. He criticized the state for having brought up the murder trial's verdict. He urged them not to shelter their decision in that of the previous jury.

Darrow was cautious not to seem disrespectful of Harrison nor insensitive to his death. He spoke positively of Harrison and mournful of his death, but heavily pressed the point that Harrison's murder and the previous murder trial were not matters to be weighed by the jury in the sanity proceeding. He told the jury that his defense of Prendergast had come despite having himself had a personal relationship and respect for Harrison, and argued (Note: Darrow argued, "The assassination of Mayor Harrison has nothing to do with this case. I do not yield before these maudlin gentlemen in the respect I pay to [Harrison's] memory, and the respect I had for him while living, and I believe, on my conscience, that I represent [Harrison's] better in standing here and urging you to save a lunatic's life than I would if I joined with them to hunt [Prendergast] to his grave. I knew [Harrison]. I respected and regarded him....I believe that, could he speak to you today, from his great heart and his charitable mind he would ask you to save the city that he loved and the state in which he lived from the infamous disgrace of sending a lunatic to the scaffold.") that executing Prendergast would do nothing to honor the slain mayor. He told the jury that it was them to decide what they considered to merit insanity, and that legal precedent alone should not constrain their understanding of it. He argued that Prendergast indeed lacked no effective discernment of right and wrong, and that it would reflect poorly to execute Prendergast in light of that, "in this day and generation, in the nineteenth century." Darrow further asserted that the jury should determine Prendergast's sanity by narrowing their view to analysis from those with particular education and expertise on matters of the mind. He lambasted the assertion by the state that lay opinion on Prendergast's mental state was just as valuable as the opinion of those with specialized expertise on mental wellness. He rhetorically asked, "can a man who lives in Illinois be so ignorant that he does not believe that special skill is necessary for treating of diseases of the mind?" He asserted that the testimony of specialists who were brought by the defense as witnesses made it clear that Prendergast was insane.

=== Emphasizing the stakes of decision the jury would make ===
As he would continue to do in the subsequent criminal trials in his legal career, he also sought to give the jury a sense gravity for the fact that the fate of the defendant was in their hands. He told the jury,

Gentlemen, there is no power on earth that can relieve you from the obligations of your conscience; that can satisfy you if you seek to shelter yourselves behind any excuse. Between this poor boy and the gallows stands this jury, and it must be by your consent that his life shall be taken if these gentlemen succeed in their pleading for his blood. You may give Mr. Morrison and Mr. Todd the grim satisfaction which the savage feels when he places another scalp at his belt, by hiding behind the supposed verdict of a supposed jury.

Darrow expressed outrage at the prospect of delivering the death penalty against Prendergaest, exclaiming, "it seems to me that the arguments I have heard advanced to this jury as an excuse for taking a human life would not be warranted amongst savage trials."

Further seeking evoke for the jury a sense gravity of fact that the fate of the defendant was in their hands, he remarked,

It requires the judgment and conscience and decision of twelve jurors before any human being can suffer death. Before this boy can be offered up as a sacrifice to the state, each one of you gentlemen must consent that in his poor, weak, deluded condition he should suffer this cruel death. Your [sic] are the ones; you cannot excuse your judgment nor your conscience by charging it to other juries or to other courts. It has been the shield of freedom and the shielf [sic] of life for centuries, this trial by jury, and that protection and that shield is as available to this poor, demented boy as to anyone of you, gentlemen of the jury, if sometime you might through some great affliction stand in his stead.

At the end of his closing remarks, in an emotional plea, Darrow said to the jury,

I know that not a drop of human blood is shed except it creates an impression on the world, and I believe, gentlemen, that to lead this poor lunatic up the steps of the scaffold, to sew him in a shroud, to tie a rope around his neck, to drop the scaffold from his feet, to leave him dangling in the air, in the presence of the humanity of today, would work infinite harm to infinite human beings on earth.

=== Retorting state's characterization of his use of emotional pleas ===
Retorting the state's assertions that he would mislead the jury with emotional pleas, Darrow said,

It has been said that I would work upon your sympathies; that by art and device I would seek to conjure you to go beyond your duty, to violate the law, to cheat justice of a victim, as they are pleased to call him. I shall not do it. If evidence we have presented here is not sufficient for you gentlemen, in this age and generation, to say that it would be an inhuman spectacle to lead this man to the gallows, then the responsibility is with you and not with me.

In pointing out that the state had made emotional pleas to mislead the jury by arguing for the jury to be emotionally sympathetic to the deceased Harrison, Darrow said,

The only issue before you, gentlemen, is the condition of this man's mind. Nothing else. And yet counsel have paraded to you the horrible details of a horrible assassination....and they have done this, gentlemen, that you might be blinded by the sight of this blood and forget the question of the mind of this unfortunate being, which alone is the issue in this case.

=== Criticisms of the witnesses for the prosecution ===
Darrow criticized lay witnesses brought forth by the state, such as jailers. He noted that the jailers who testified held patronage positions, deriding them as holding the jobs of, "watching prisoners and carrying caucuses."

He passionately criticized the medical professionals that the state had brought in to testify, exclaiming,

Gentlemen, it makes my blood boil with indignation to think of the damnable course of these men who disgrace the medical profession; these men who have used a high and divine calling, that of saving of human life and the alleviation of human pain, who are called here by these attorneys, and who went into that jail, imposing upon this poor, weak mind, who got his confidence through deceit and lies, and then after that failed to ask him the very things that would manifest his state of mind. They had no right not to know his condition....these so-called doctors went into the prison pen of that poor boy as a ferret goes down into the hole of a rabbit, to drag forth their victim. They asked their questions as a hunter would set a snare to catch a bird and they used the power of the State and their superior intellect and learning, not to find out whether the State was about to make a sacrifice in the shape of a miserable victim, but to find excuses to salve your conscience, stultify your intellect, overcome your reason and help in the erection of a scaffold and the tying of a rope.

Darrow assailed the reputations individual doctors that had testified for the state. He asserted to the jury that no high-minded jury would execute any man based on the basis of the testimony by Dr. Corbus, who was one of the doctors that had testified for the state. He characterized Corbus as a liar that had met with Prendergast at the jail under false pretenses, having asked a jailer to tell Prendergast that he was a businessman so that Prendergast would be unaware of the fact he was a doctor. Assailing Corbus' competency as a doctor, Darrow quipped, "that was entirely unnecessary, for no human being would ever have supposed he was a doctor anyway, even if he had said so." He used similar humor to assail the credibility of others. Of Dr. Bluthhardt, who also testified for the state, Darrow quipped, "Now if Dr. Buthardt had on a white apron, we would all take him for a butcher. He looks like it, he testified like it." He also characterized Bluthardt as a being a "political doctor". He assailed another, Dr. Davis, as being elderly and senile.

He also argued that even the reports of the doctors that the state had brought forth confirmed aspects of Prendergast's condition that could support a conclusion of insanity, such as Prendergast's obsession with the ideas of Henry George and his sincere delusion that he was supposed to be appointed as corporation counsel.

=== Characterization of Prendergast as a victim to his own insanity ===
Darrow characterized Prendergast as a victim to the state of his (insane) creation, drawing on a metaphor from the Hebrew Bible (Old Testament of the Christian Bible) (Note: Isaiah 64:8 and Jeremiah 18) of god as a potter shaping clay and a similar parable of a philosopher working with pottery. The passion with which he delivered these remarks took many in the court room aback. He first offered the parable, (Note: Darrow remarked, "Ages ago, at least eight centuries ago, a great poet and student of philosophy of life studied the questions of human nature as men have scarcely studied them today, and he arranged various human beings in the shape of vessels fresh from the potter's hands, and he made each one of these pots to plead its cause. And one poor, deformed vessel spoke up from amongst the rest and said, 'you leer at my misshapen form, but did the hand of the great potter shape?') and next remarked,

Gentlemen, here is Prendergast, the product of the infinite God, not his own making. He comes here for some inscrutable reason, the same as you and I, without his will, without his knowledge, because the infinite God of the infinite universe saw fit to make him as he willed. His fault is not the fault of Prendergast. It is the fault of the infinite power that made him the object you find today. I beseech you, gentlemen, do not visit upon this poor boy the afflictions which God almighty placed upon him for some inscrutable reason unknown to us....I trust, that you gentlemen will take it feeling the same sacred duty, the same care, that I have felt. This poor, weak, misshapen vessel I place in your protection and your hands. I beg of you, gentlemen, take it gently, tenderly, carefully. Do not, I beseech you, do not break the clay, for though weak and cracked and useless it is the handiwork of the infinite God.

== Verdict ==
On July 3, 1894, the court reconvened and Judge Payne over gave twenty minutes gave jury instructions. Payne instructed the jury,

In this proceeding the question simply is, does he understand and appreciate the fact that he has been tried and found guilty of murder? Does he understand the nature of this proceeding.

Is he so far sane as to be capable of making preparation for death? Or, in a word, is he so far sane that it would not be contrary to humanity to execute him. This is the test and whether he be sane or insane in any other sense it does not concern us to inquire.

If you believe from the evidence that the prisoner has insane delusions in respect to some subjects, yet if you are further satisfied from the evidence that none of these delusions render him unconscious of his present condition or unfit him for preparation for death, then you are instructed that such delusions do not constitute such insanity or lunacy as to afford a reason for staying the execution of the sentence of the court.

After the court adjourned, Prendergast sat in his chair "sullenly" for five minutes before requesting for the bailiff to return him to the court's holding cell.

The jury then left at 10:20 am to begin deliberating. At 12:55 pm, they informed the court that a verdict had been reached. Their verdict that found that Prendergast was sane. Prendergast was then scheduled for execution ten days later (on July 13). Darrow made a motion for a new proceeding, which Judge Payne denied. Prendergast's appeal was a rare instance in Darrow's legal career of a complete loss. He would be the only of Darrow's clients to be executed.

== Later impact ==
The case was a unique loss in Darrow's legal career. Darrow repurposed much of the rhetoric he had presented in Prendergast's defense while representing murderers Leopold and Loeb.

Pendergast's case would continue to be mentioned as a prominently for many years subsequent. For example, in the 1917 murder trial of Henry Lee Moore, a testifying medical expert's named Prendergast and Guiteau as two individuals who (in the expert's opinion) had been executed despite being insane.

== Analysis ==
In a journal article published by Criminal Law Magazine later in 1894, S. H. Dent Jr. observed, "This case assumed a novel attitude, and there are so many divergent opinions on its final outcome, the case being one of first importance to the [legal] community."

=== Legality of Judge Chetlain's actions ===
In his Criminal Law Magazine article, Dent observed,

It is contended by some of the foremost lawyers that the action of Judge Cetlain in setting aside the sentence until the question of the defendant's insanity, which is alleged to have come upon him since the convention could be determined, was absolutely illegal and unauthorized.

However, Dent himself disagreed, writing that "the action of Judge Chetlain is legal, although he had no express authority from the Statute. Dent reasoned,

It seems to me that erroneous opinions upon this case have arisen from a misapplication of a well established legal principle, which is, that when judgement has been pronounced and the term has passed it is no longer in the power of the court to change it, except in certain specified cases which are not covered by the facts of this case. This misapplication of this principle consists in the failure to draw a distinction between the judgement and its execution...At Common Law, the sentence to death, or any other corporal punishment, is generally silent as to time[of execution]...By statute [of Illinois] the court is required to fix the time, but it will hardly be contented that that makes the time part of the judgement proper. In fact, the judgement proper is determined by the jury alone...as ''they'' must find the defendant guilty, and fix the punishment. The fixing of time of punishment is merely done as a ministerial act, required of the court, just as the issuance of an execution by the clerk on a civil judgement is. It is true that the time within which the court must fix the punishment is limited by Statute, which must be strictly followed; but [this merely quires] the time [to be] fixed by the court [in order for the court to be in accordance] the Statute. [Therefore, the statute is still adhered to even if the execution is ultimately delayed and not carried out] at that time...It certainly cannot be contended that this Statute deprives the court of its Common Law powers to control and direct its own process. It follows from these principles, that the Criminal Court has the power to regulate and control the process which has issued from it, so that it has the Common Law power to postpone the time of execution.

Some of those who held a view (disagreed to by Dent) that state statute had required the date set by a court for an execution be strictly adhered to, also believed that the delay of his execution should have created grounds for Prendergast to be spared by a writ of habeas corpus. Dent also disagreed with this interpretation of law.

=== Subsequent analysis of outcome and Prendergast's sanity ===
More modern works have been published that content Prendergast contend that the defense indeed was correct in its assertions of Prendergast's insanity. Some have faulted political realities, such anti-"crank" sentiment and a desire to "make an example" of Prendergast, as playing a key role in his conviction and execution.

Darrow would later reflect in his 1905 autobiography The Story of My Life,

I did undertake to save the life of a poor demented imbecile who killed the first Carter Harrison while he was mayor of Chicago, and I did not succeed; but he had been tried and sentenced and the case had been affirmed by the Supreme Court, when, with two fine lawyers, S. S. Gregory and James Harlan, I ventured to save him on an inquest of sanity, and we failed.
Every one believes now, and most people believed then, that he was insane and idiotic; but he had killed a mayor, as another crazy man had killed President James A. Garfield, and was promptly hanged for the deed; but the execution of Guiteau, who was plainly insane, did not prevent another lunatic from killing President McKinley. In all these cases the people of course wanted the killer put to death, and the voice of the people is the voice of their God.

A 2002 journal article by Edward M. Burke that was published in Journal of Criminal Law & Criminology noted that in Prendergast's trial and sanity proceeding,, expert witnesses for the prosecution ignored key aspects of Prendergast's biography that had been outlined by lay witnesses for the defense,

"Expert" witnesses testified that although [Prendergast] was a "crank," he was, in fact, sane when he pulled the trigger and murdered Harrison. They paid little attention to the report that he had suffered a severe head trauma as a child that left him impaired, or the fact that his grandfather had died in Ireland in a lunatic asylum.

== Portrayal in media ==
In the 1991 made-for-TV movie Darrow (which starred Kevin Spacey as Clarence Darrow) the sanity hearing was dramatized and Prendergast was portrayed by actor Paul Klementowicz.

== See also ==
- Capital punishment in the United States
- Funeral of Carter Harrison III
