= Elmer C. Jensen House =

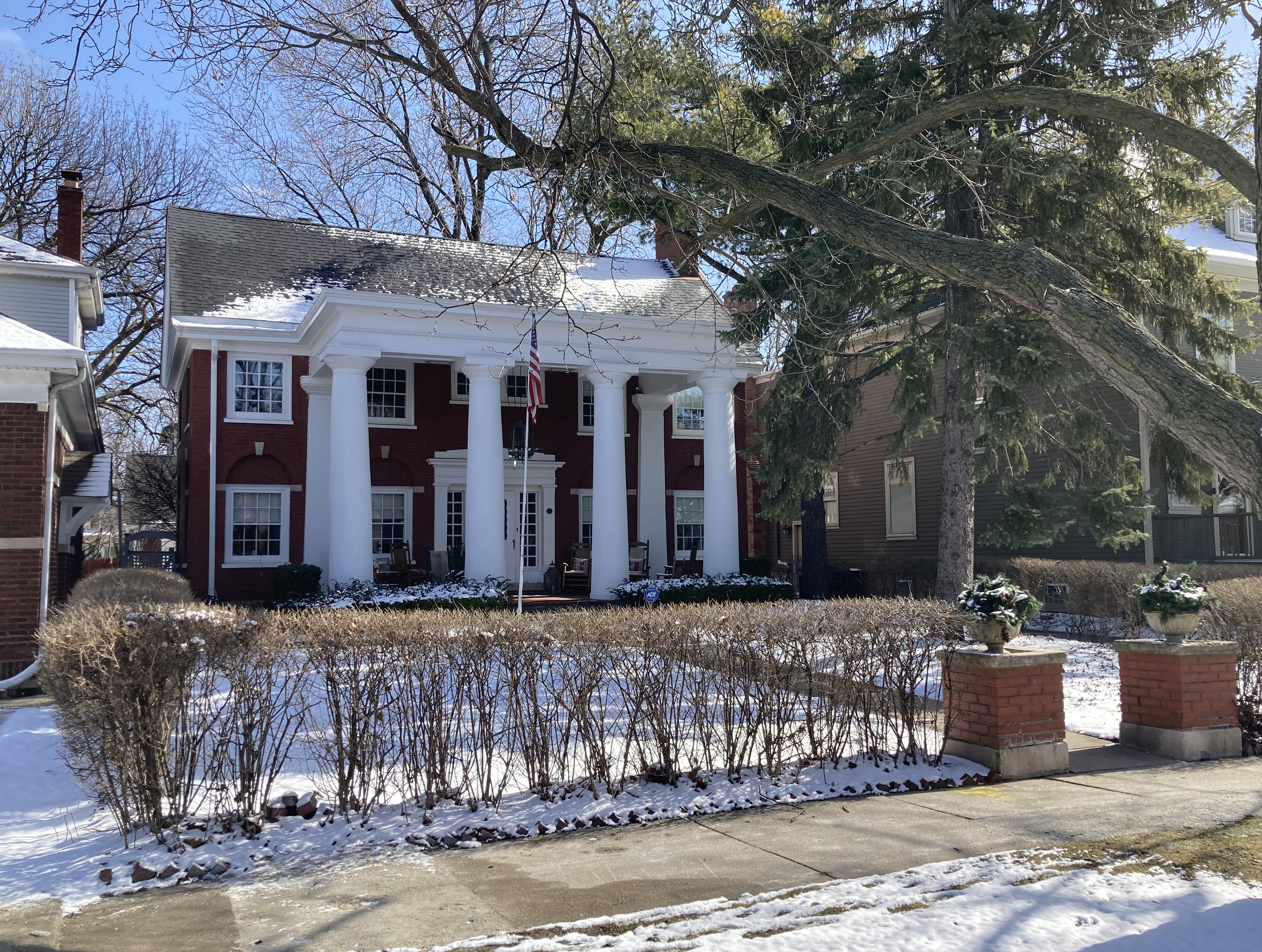
- Interactive map of the Elmer C. Jensen House area

General information
- Type: House
- Location: 4041 North Lowell Avenue, Chicago, Illinois, United States
- Coordinates: 41°57′17″N 87°44′11″W
- Completed: 1905

Design and construction
- Architect: Elmer C. Jensen

The Elmer C. Jensen House was built in 1905. It was designed by, and built for, architect Elmer C. Jensen. It is located in the Old Irving Park neighborhood of Chicago, Illinois, United States.
