= Trude Building =

Early American skyscraper; possibly the first skyscraper to face demolition

Coordinates: 41.8842°N 87.6267°W

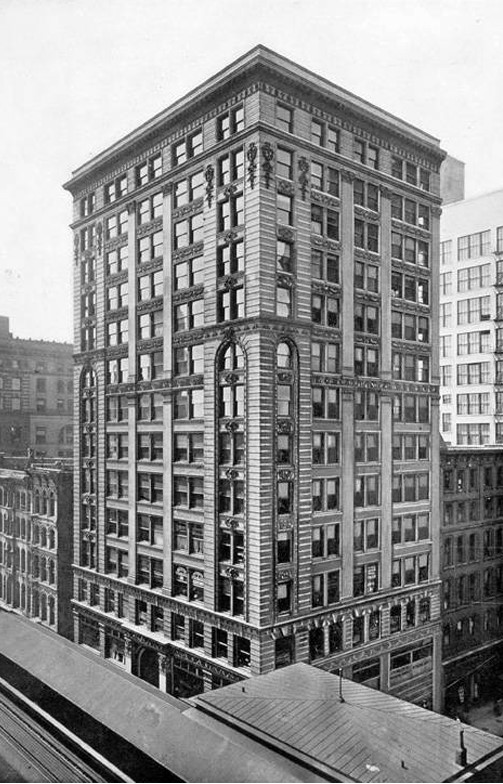
The Trude Building in 1897

The Trude Building was a 19th-century skyscraper that was located in Chicago. It was designed by Jenney & Mundie and was constructed in 1897 for A. S. Trude. It was demolished in 1912 in order clear way for an expansion of the Marshall Field and Company Building. This considered to have been one of the first demolitions, if not the first, of a skyscraper.

== Building details ==
A. S. Trude had the building constructed in 1897. It was designed by the firm Jenney & Mundie. It stood between either fourteen or sixteen stories tall. The site had previously been occupied by a six-story building that had been lost to a fire.

The building sat at the southwest corner of the intersection of Wabash Avenue and Randolph Street. It was located on a site 104 feet (32 m) long along its Wabash Avenue face and 75 feet (23 m) long along its Randolph Street face. It was expanded to occupy this full site several years after the original portion of the building was built, as its neighboring building was lost in a fire. The new tower was considered to be of high-quality "fireproof" construction.

The building housed the headquarters of Lord & Thomas, a notable advertising agency. The Social Democratic Party of America was headquartered in the building, as was The Social Democrat newspaper.

== Sale to Marshall Field and demolition ==
Marshall Field & Co. acquired the building and its land in a ninety-nine year lease agreement that saw them agree to pay Trude an annual rent of $60,000 for ninety-nine years, beginning in July 1911. At the time, the Cook County Board of Review evaluated the building at $125,000 and its land at $597,630, making the property worth $722,630. The lease permitted Marshall Field & Co. to, at any time before August 1, 1919, replace the building with a new high-grade "fireproof" building so long as it cost no less than $750,000.

After acquiring the site, Marshall Field & Co. demolished the tower in order to expand the Marshall Field and Company Building. This is considered to have been one of the first demolitions, if not the first, of a skyscraper.

Steel columns from the former Trude Building were reutilized in the construction of the Bosch Building, a loft building in Chicago.
