= Mundie & Jensen =

American architectural firm

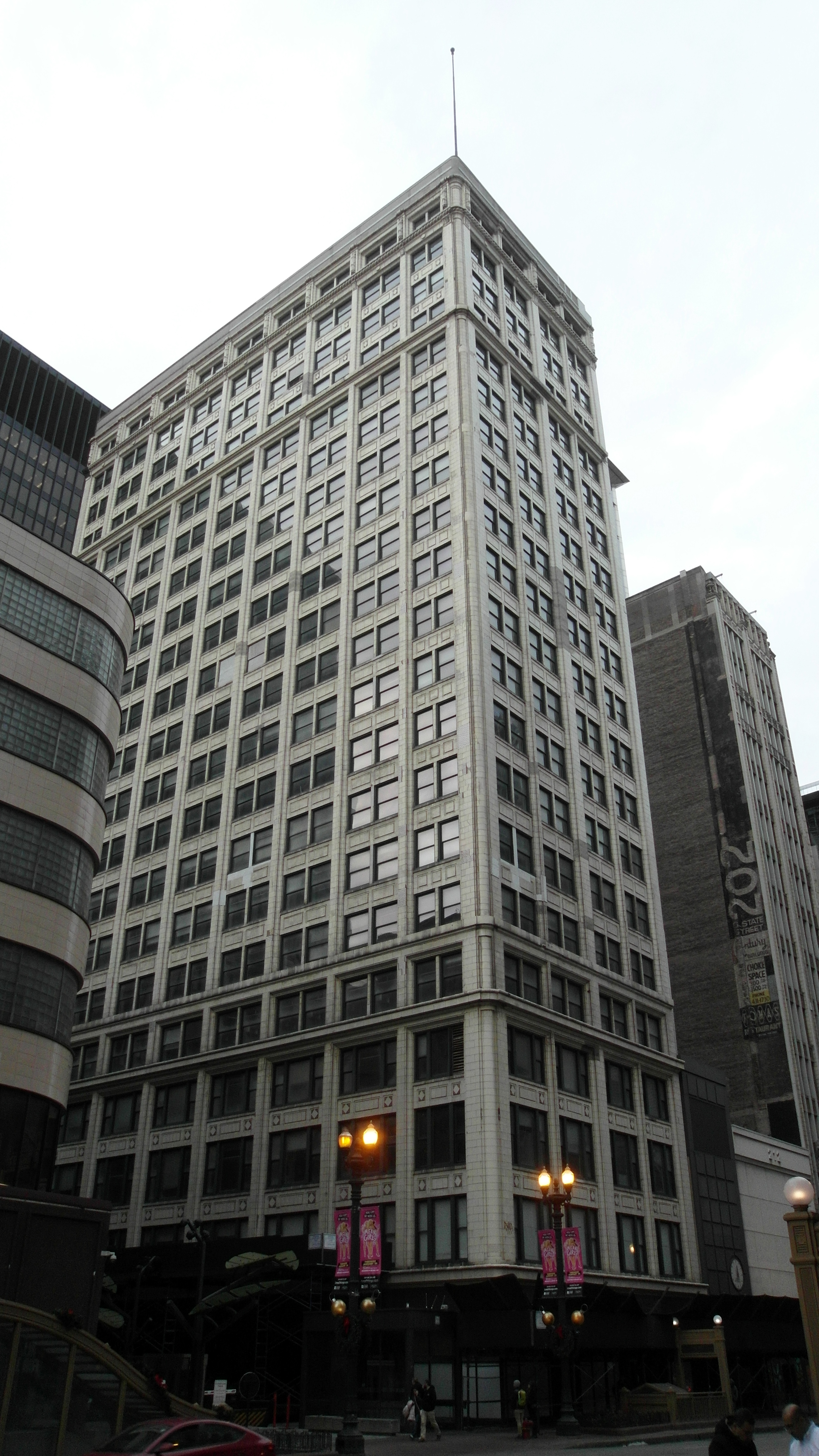
Consumers Building in Chicago, one of the skyscrapers designed by Mundie & Jensen.

Mundie & Jensen was an architectural firm in Chicago, Illinois. Several of its works are listed on the National Register of Historic Places (NRHP).

It was a partnership of William Bryce Mundie and Elmer C. Jensen. Mundie was a draftsman from Canada who worked in Chicago for William Le Baron Jenney, "father of the American skyscraper", and joined him as partner in 1891.

Associated firms were:

- Jenney & Mundie, 1891 to 1904
- Jenney, Mundie & Jensen, 1905 to late 1906
- Mundie & Jensen 1907 to 1935
- Mundie, Jensen, Bourke & Havens 1936 to 1939

Works by the firm and/or one of its partners include (with attribution):

- Ludington Building (1892), 1104 South Wabash Avenue, Chicago, Illinois (Jenney & Mundie), NRHP-listed
- Trude Building (1897), Chicago, Illinois (Jenney & Mundie)
- Municipal Courts Building (1906–07), 116 South Michigan Avenue, Chicago, Illinois (Jenney, Mundie & Jensen), NRHP-listed
- National City Bank (1913), 227 Main Street, Evansville, Indiana (Mundie & Jensen), NRHP-listed
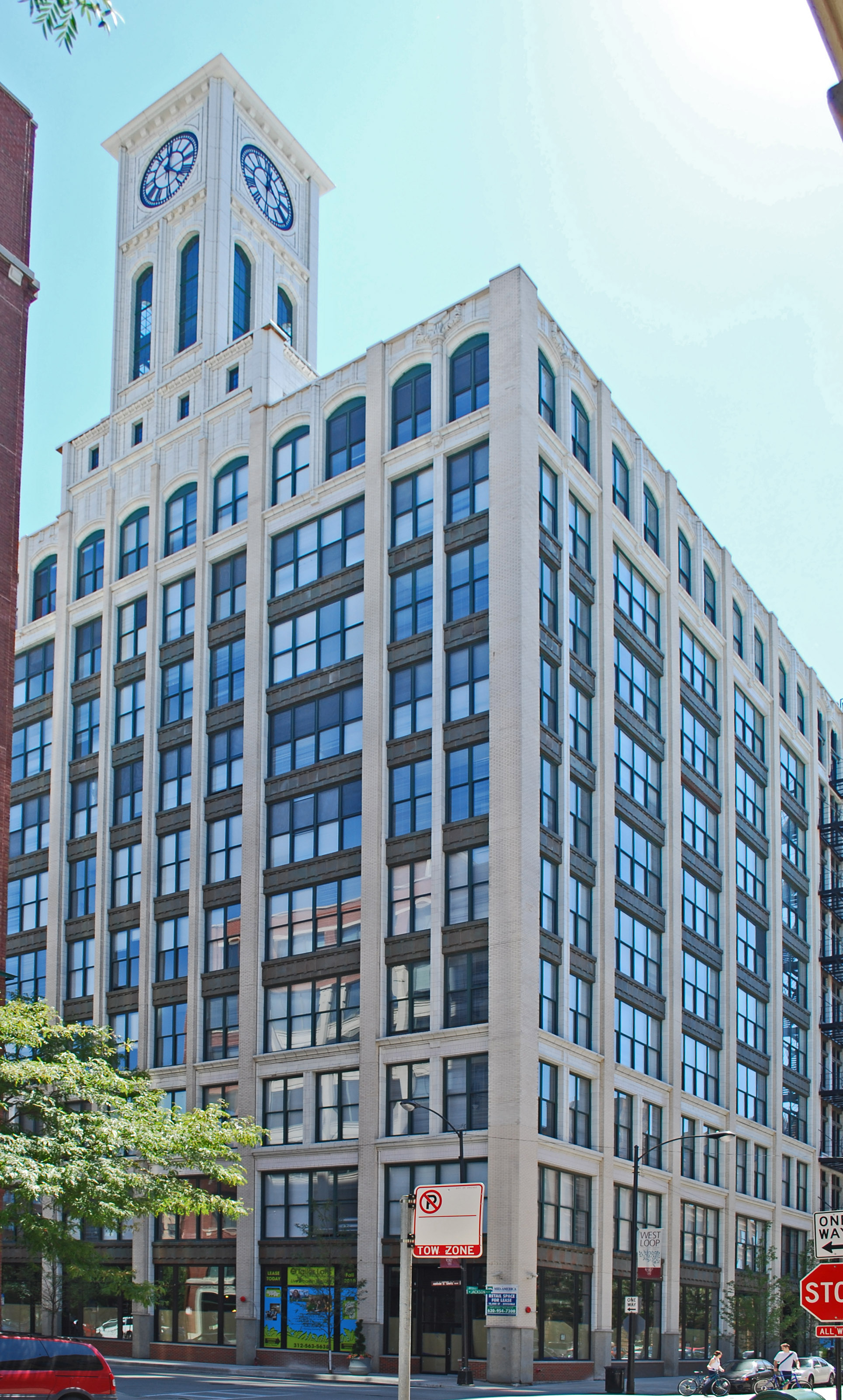
  International Tailoring Company Building, Chicago, Illinois (1915–16)
- Consumers Building (1913), 220 South State Street, Chicago, Illinois (Jenney, Mundie & Jensen)
- International Tailoring Company Building (1915–16), 847 West Jackson Boulevard, Chicago, Illinois (Mundie & Jensen), NRHP-listed

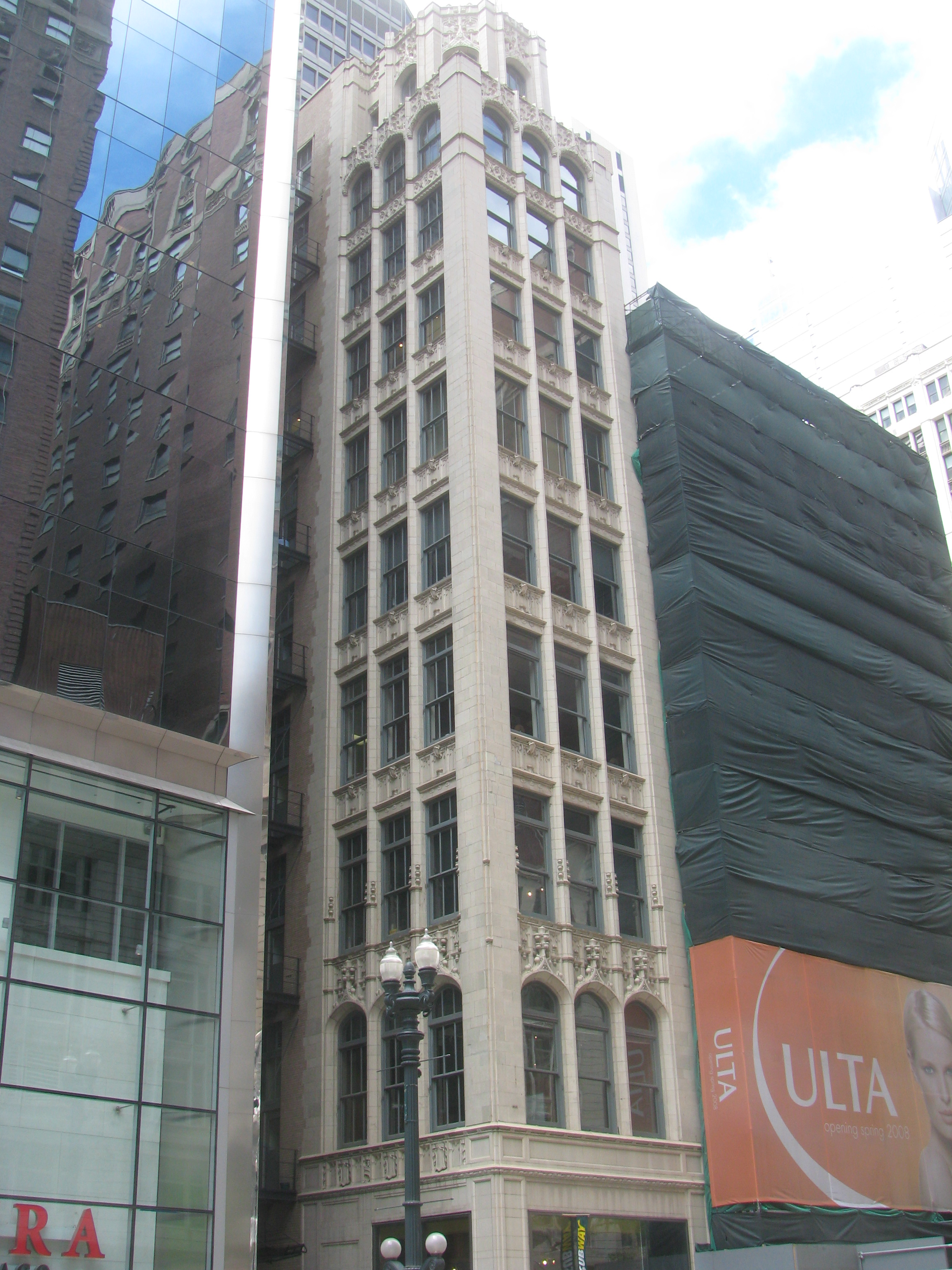
Singer Building, Chicago, Illinois (1908)

From 1884 to 1894, noted architect D. Everett Waid was a draftsman who rose to chief draftsman for Jenney & Mundie, according to The New York Times, before going on to establish his own architectural practice; a photograph of the firm's employees would indicate he continued working there for some years longer. Architect and engineer Paul V. Hyland, who worked as a supervisor for several Chicago area firms, worked for the firm at some time.

For William Le Baron Jenney or William LeBaron Jenney or William Jenney or William Le Baron Jenny (all redirect to one article), there are:

- Garfield Park (1874), 100 North Central Park Avenue, Chicago, Illinois
- Humboldt Park (1877), Roughly bounded by North Sacramento and Augusta Boulevards, and North Kedzie, North and North California Avenues. and West Division Street, Chicago, Illinois
- Manhattan Building (1889–91), 431 South Dearborn Street, Chicago, Illinois
- Leiter II Building (1891), Northeast corner of South State and East Congress Streets., Chicago, Illinois
- First Congregational Church (1892), 412 South 4th Street. Manistee, Michigan
- Metropolitan Block, 772 Main Street, Lake Geneva, Wisconsin

The Elmer C. Jensen House (1905), in the Old Irving Park neighborhood of Chicago, was designed by and for Jensen, and is now a house museum.
