= Stephen S. Gregory =

American lawyer

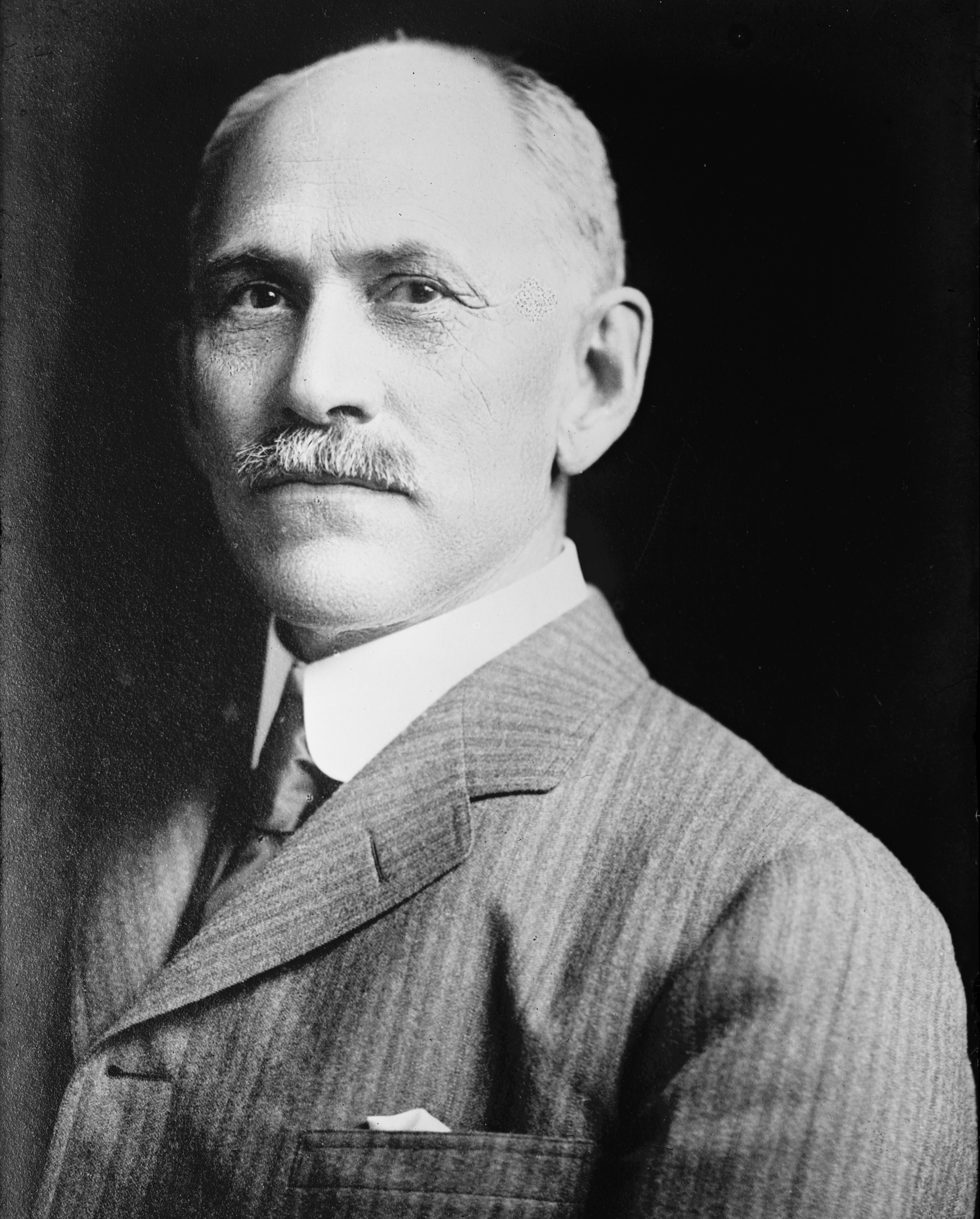
Stephen S. Gregory

Stephen Strong Gregory Sr. (1849–1920) was a Chicago lawyer. In 1911, he served as president of the American Bar Association.

== Early life and education ==
Stephen S. Gregory was born in Unadilla, New York on November 16, 1849. He was the brother of Charles Noble Gregory, himself a distinguished writer on legal subjects. His family moved to Madison, Wisconsin in 1858. He was educated at the University of Wisconsin–Madison, receiving an A.B. in 1870, an LL.B. in 1871, and an A.M. in 1873.

== Legal career ==
Gregory began the practice of law in Madison, before moving to Chicago in 1874. In Chicago, he forged his first law partnership with his former law school classmate Arthur H. Chetlain, founding the law firm of Chetlain & Gregory. Gregory joined the firm of Tenney & Flower in 1879, with the firm shortly thereafter becoming Flower, Tenney & Gregory. He formed a new firm, Gregory, Booth & Flower in 1888. He founded a new firm in 1900, with his son Tappan becoming a partner.

Gregory's practice involved him in several high-profile cases. He represented Chicago in Illinois Central Railroad v. Illinois, 146 U.S. 387 (1892). He represented Patrick Eugene Prendergast after his assassination of Chicago Mayor Carter Harrison, Sr. in 1893, including in his sanity inquiry. He was co-counsel to Clarence Darrow and James S. Harlan in the effort to save Prendergast from execution. After this effort failed, Gregory visited with Prendergast at the Cook County Jail five minutes prior to his execution and was allowed to shake his client's hand one last time and exchange a few last words with him. Gregory worked as a special counsel for the City of Chicago alongside John S. Miller to present the city's positions to the United States Supreme Court in the case Missouri v. Illinois, in which the court agreed with the constitutionality and regularity of the Sanitary District of Chicago.

Gregory served as president of the Chicago Bar Association in 1900, of the Illinois State Bar Association in 1904, and of the American Bar Association in 1911.

== Personal life ==
On November 25, 1980, he married Janet M. Tappan, granddaughter of Arthur Tappan. The couple had three children together: Charlotte C. Gregory, Tappan Gregory, and Stephen S. Gregory Jr.

Gregory died at his home in Chicago on October 24, 1920.
