= Funeral of Carter Harrison III =

1893 funeral of mayor of Chicago

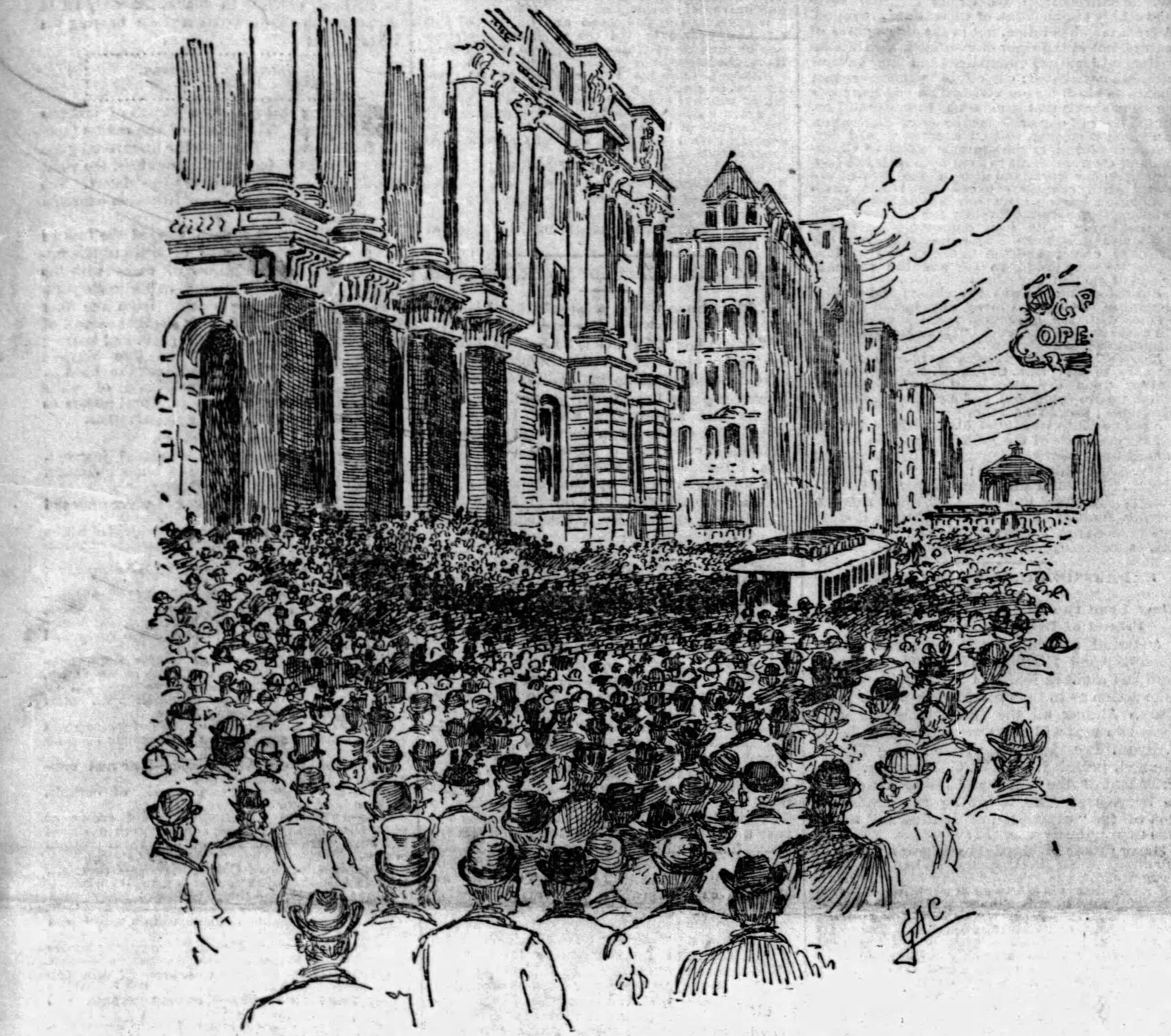
Illustration of a crowd along Clark Street outside of Chicago City Hall waiting to pay respects to Harrison as he lay in state

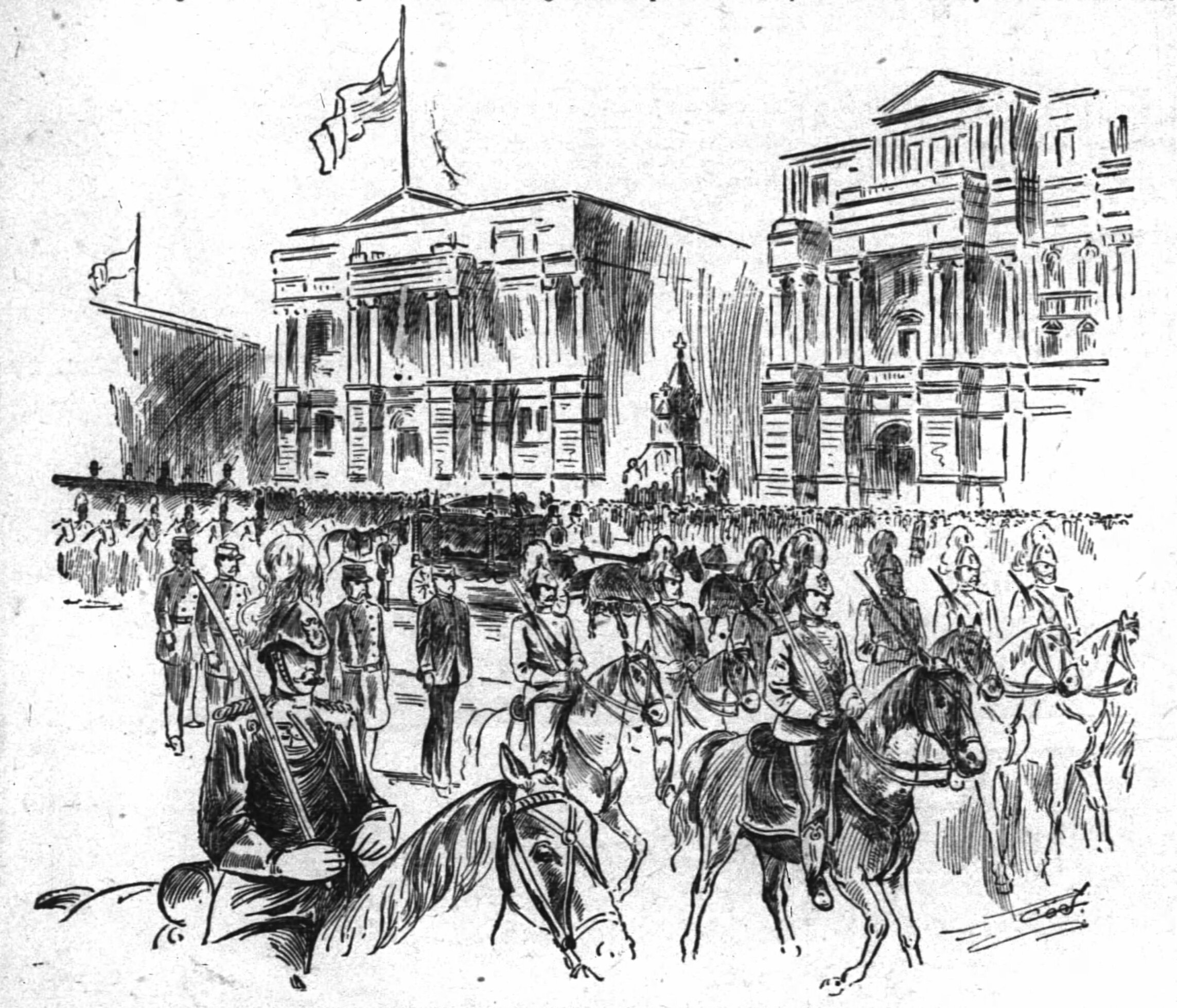
Illustration of Harrison's funeral procession departing the city hall

The funeral of Carter Harrison III took place in Chicago on October 31 and November 1, 1893. Harrison, the mayor of Chicago, had been assassinated on October 28. Following a private ceremony at Harrison's residence on the morning of October 31, his remains were brought to Chicago City Hall, where Harrison lay in state until the following morning. On November 1, Harrison's remains were transported from in a massive and elaborate hours-long two-leg procession. During the first leg, his remains were transported to the Church of the Epiphany where a brief Episcopal service was conducted. During the second leg, his remains were transported from the church to Graceland Cemetery, where they were interred. More than 100,000 mourners were estimated to have waited to visit his casket when it was lying in state at City Hall. The funeral procession was estimated to have featured 60,000 participants, and to have been attended by crowds of between 500,000 and 1 million. It ranks as one of the largest attendances in history for a funeral.

Harison's assassination caused a dramatic scaling-back of the planned closing festivities for the World's Columbian Exposition, as the city entered a period of public mourning. In the period between Harrison's assassination and his remains lying in state at the Chicago City Hall, several memorial services were held and his body was displayed for mourners at his private residence. On the day of his funeral procession, there were acts of memorialization for Harrison performed in other U.S. cities.

== Assassination ==
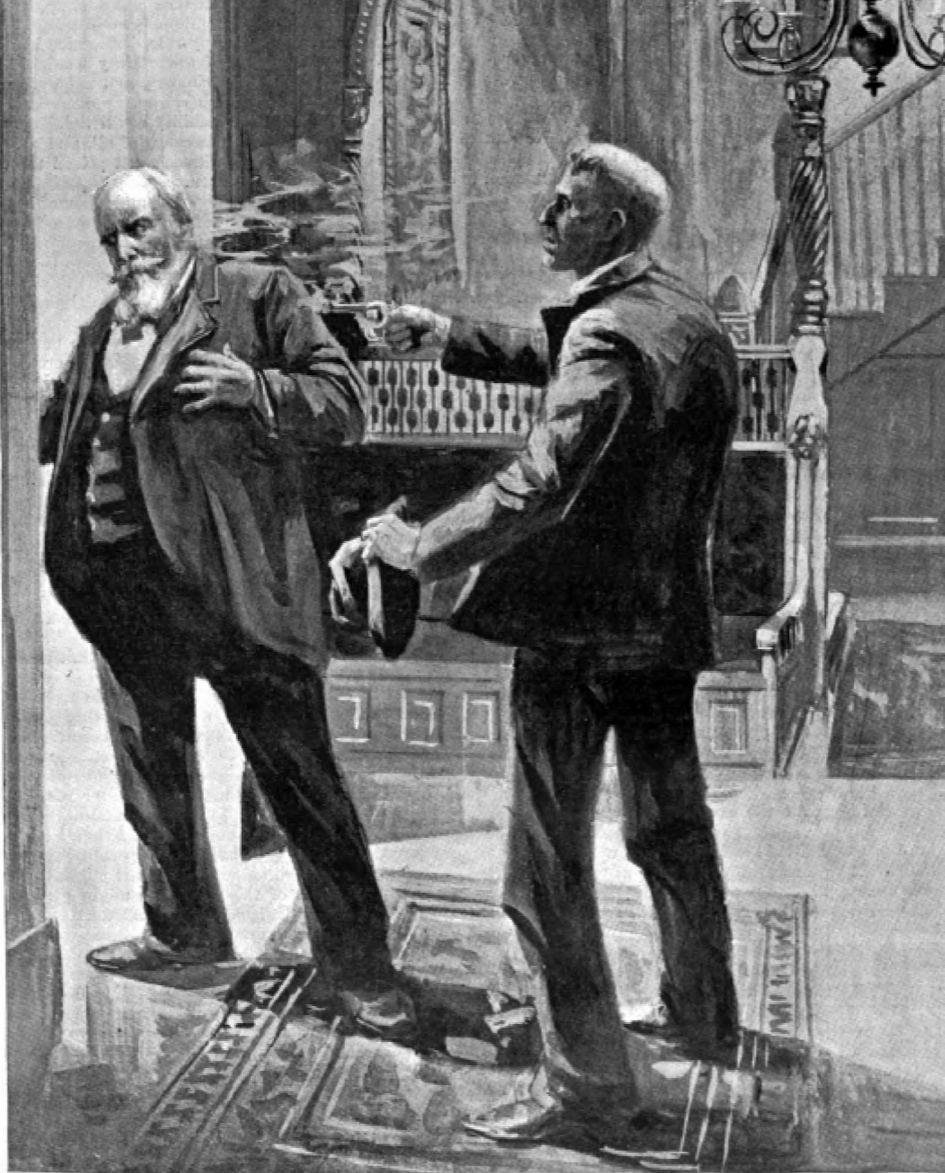
Illustration of Prendergast assassinating Harrison

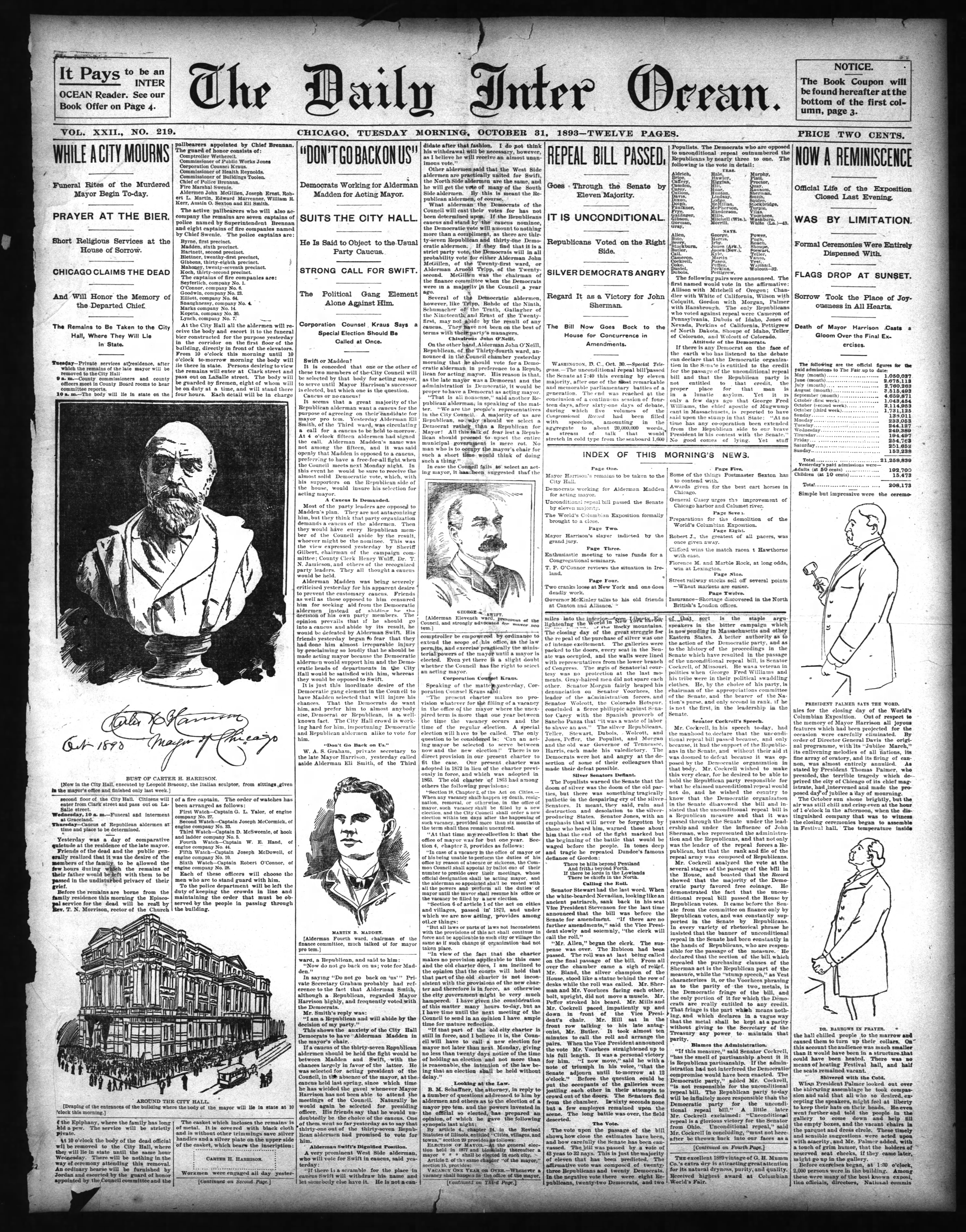
Front page of the October 31 edition of the Chicago Inter Ocean, with public mourning of Harrison as the main story and the vastly-downscaled exposition closing ceremonies relegated to lesser coverage

Harrison, the mayor of Chicago, was shot to death at his own residence by assassin Patrick Eugene Prendergast. The assassination occurred on October 28, two days prior to the planned closing of the World's Columbian Exposition (a major world's fair in Chicago).

Harrison's funeral resulted in the cancellation of planned grand-ceremonies that were to mark the closing of the World's Columbian Exposition. Prior to assassination, arrangements instead had been made for elaborate ceremonies October 30–31 to close the fair On October 29, a decision was made to cancel the ceremonies. The closing of the fair was instead marked with small and somber ceremony on October 31. Instead of previously planned grand closing festivities, the most notable ceremony of the fair's closing days was a memorial ceremony for Harrison held in the exposition's Festival Hall.

== Private service at residence (morning of October 31) ==
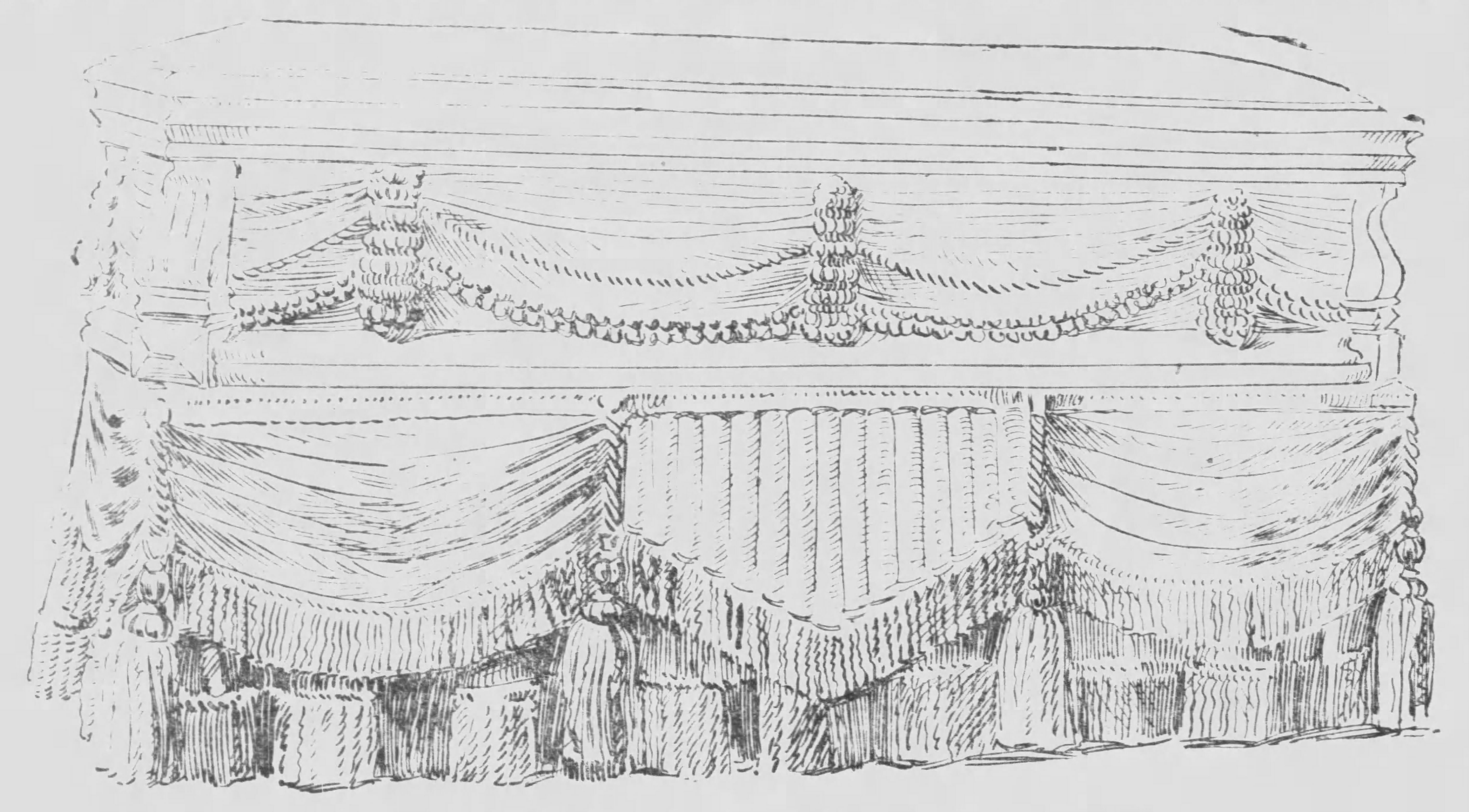
Illustration of Harrison's coffin

Harrison's body was initially laid on display for mourners in his residence's downstairs window. On the morning of October 31, a private funeral service was conducted at his residence. The service was presided over by Rev Dr. T. N. Morrison Jr. After the private funeral, the body left the Harrison for public observations to begin.

== Transport by honor guard to City Hall (morning of October 31) ==
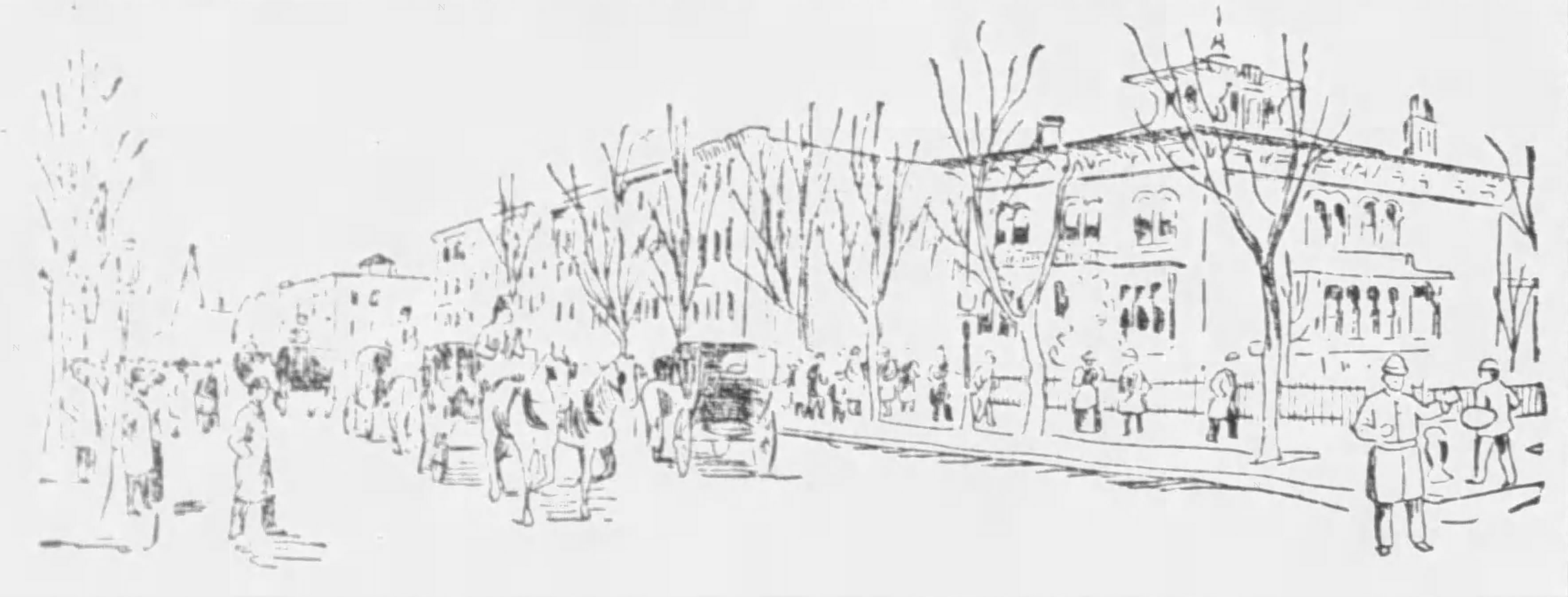
Illustration of Harrison's remains leaving his residence to be transported to Chicago City Hall

The Chicago City Council organized a "Pageant of Grief", which began with the display of Harrison's remains at Chicago City Hall. In the morning of October 31, Harrison's body was transported from his residence at the city hall, where it lay in state for 24 hours of public viewing (from 10am local time on October 31 until 10am November 1). Accompanying the coffin in its trip to City Hall was an honor guard of city officials, including City Controller Oscar D. Wetherell, Commissioner of Public Works Hiram J. Jones, Corporation Counsel Adolph Kraus, Building Commissioner Toolen, Fire Department Chief Dennis J. Swenie, and Police Chief Michael Brennan, Health Commissioner Reynolds, as well as Aldermen John McGillen, E. Marrenner, Eli Smith, Joseph Ernst, Robert L. Martin, A.O. Sexton, and William R. Kerr.

Pallbearers during the transport of Harrison's remains City Hall included former Illinois governor Richard J. Oglesby, former senator and judge Lyman Trumbull, Major General Nelson A. Miles, along with eight fire captains and seven police captains. A crowd of approximately 300 gathered outside the house to watch as the remains were carried from the home and placed into a hearse. A parade of carriages, military guards, and police guards accompanied the hearse en route to Chicago City Hall. Many city officials took part in the accompanying honor guard. It was reported that, at the start of the route, "dense crowds thronged the streets and the sidewalks for blocks" surrounding Harrison's residence. Funeral plans set for there to be no procession or demonstrations in this transport. Only the guard of honor was permitted to accompany his remains to the city hall, and no musical accompaniment was performed for this journey.

When the remains arrived at the city hall, a band of 200 musicians played Chopin's famous funeral march, "Piano Sonata No. 2". This was deliberately planned to be the first instance in Harrison's public funeral in which music would be performed.

== Lying in state at Chicago City Hall (October 31–November 1) ==
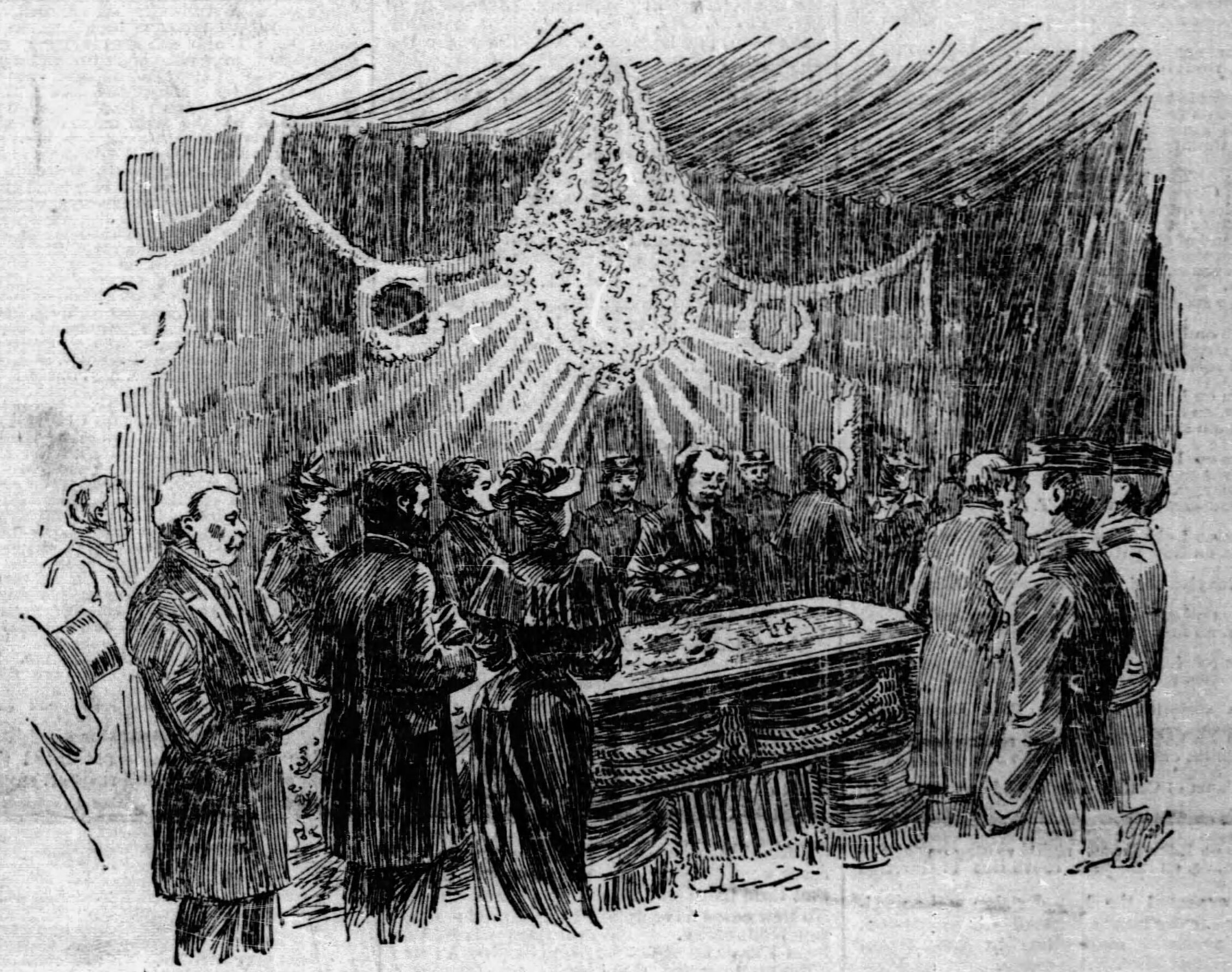
Illustration of Harrison lying in state at Chicago City Hall

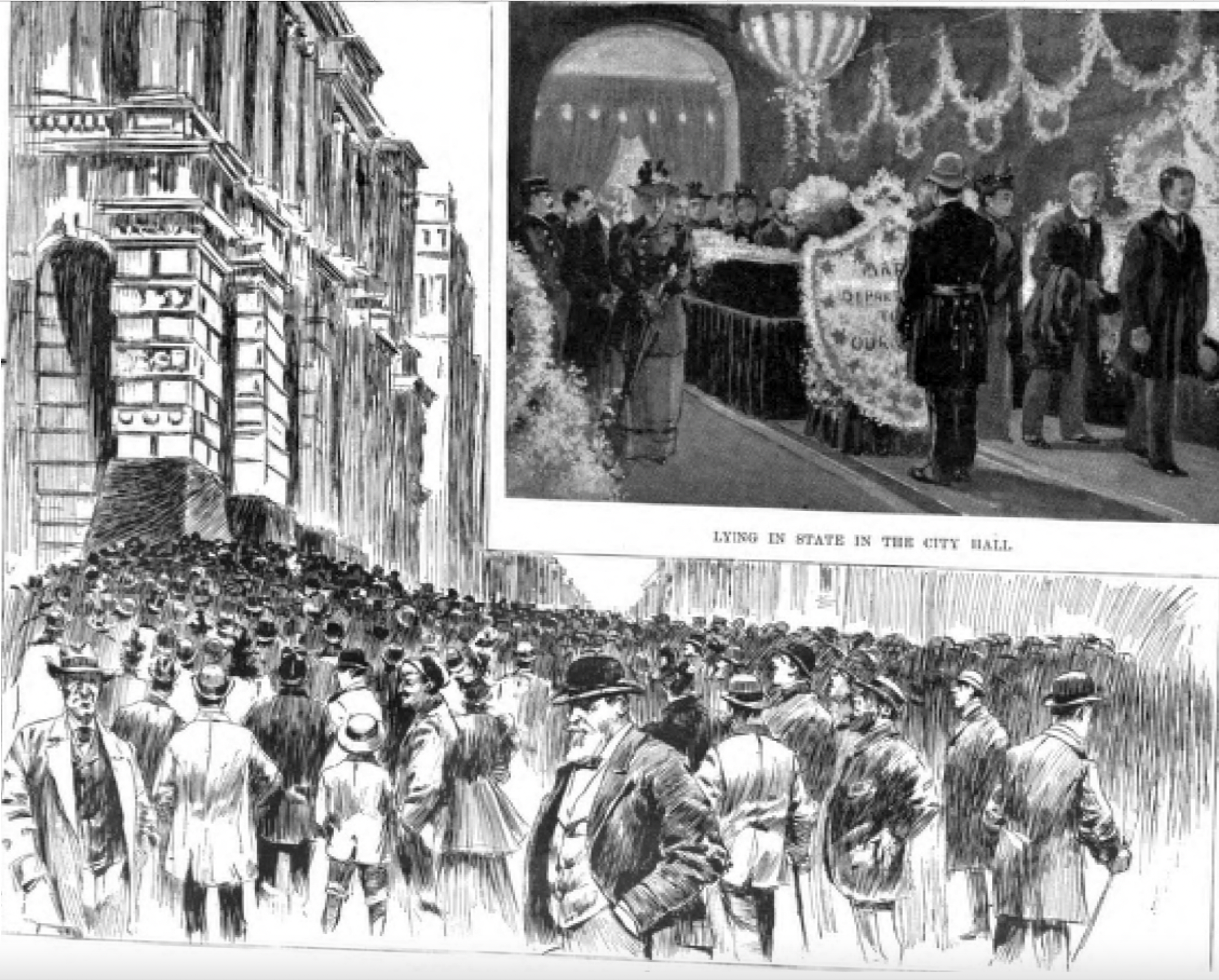
Illustration crowds outside City Hall waiting to pay respects as Harrison lay in state (inset upper right illustration of people viewing the coffin)

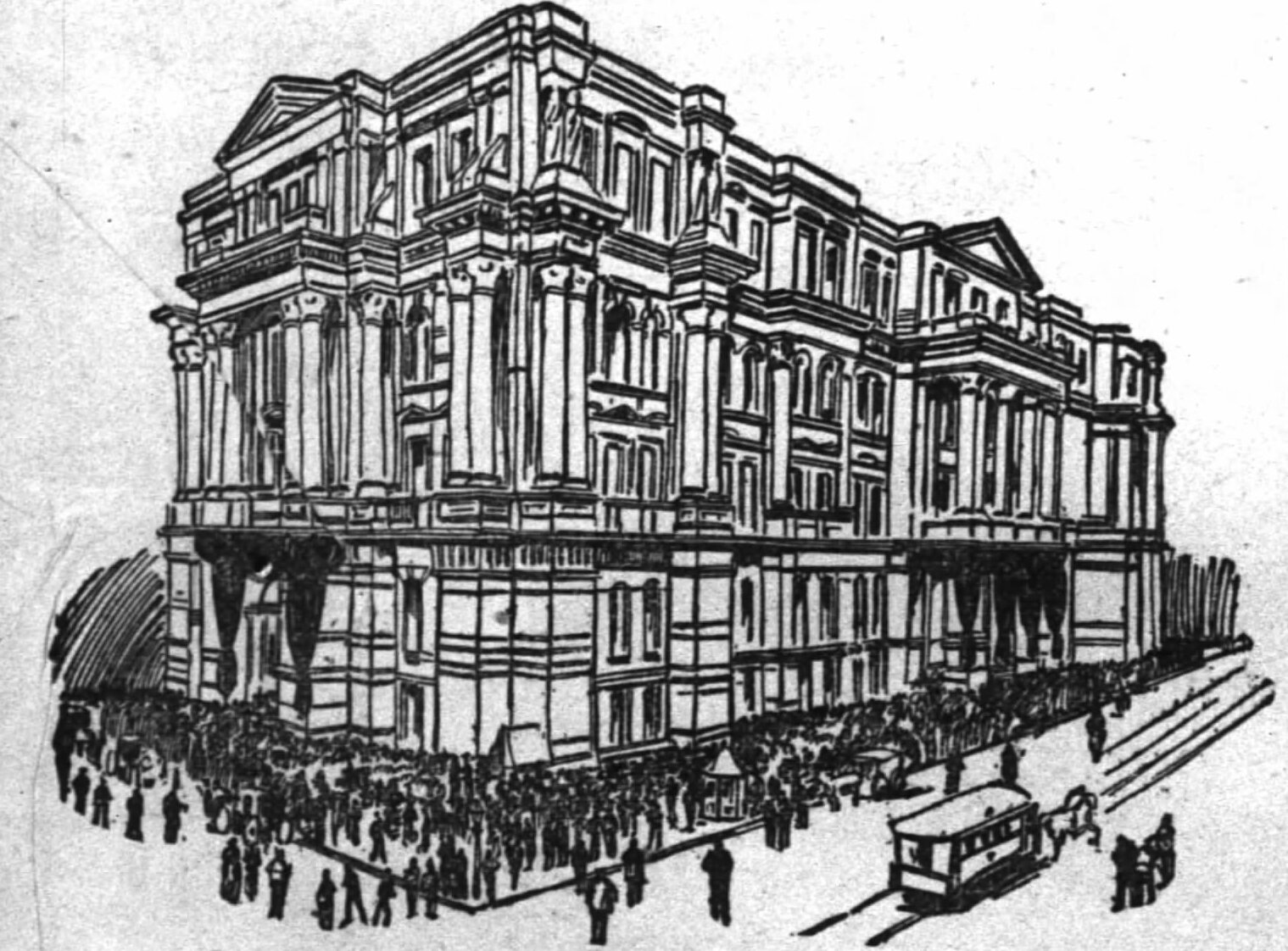
Illustration of a crowd outside of Chicago City Hall ahead of the display and public visitation of Harrison's remains there

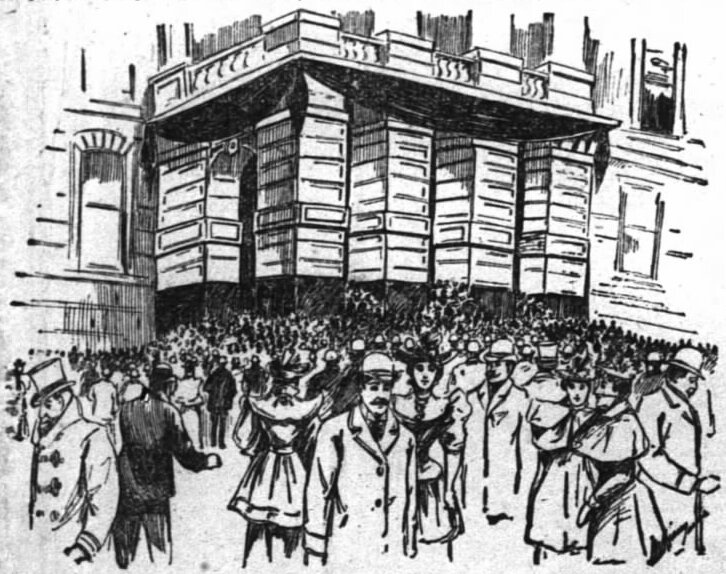
Illustration of a crowd outside of the Clark Street side of City Hall

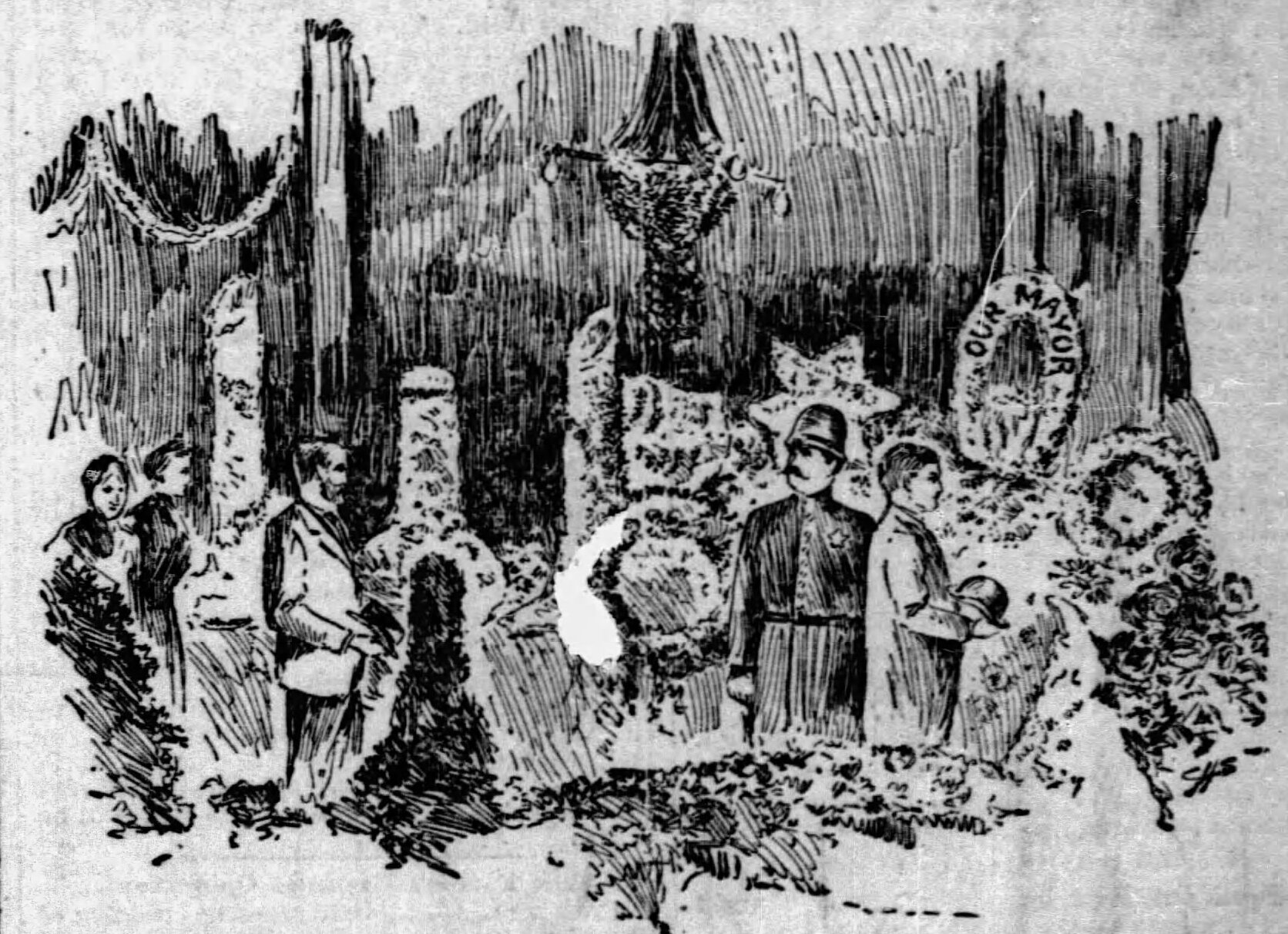
Illustration of mourners leaving flowers near Harrison's coffin at Chicago City Hall

During the 24-hour period that Harrison's remains lay in state at the city hall, the public was admitted to public view the casket. For the viewing, the public was queued on LaSalle Street, and exited the building on Clark Street.

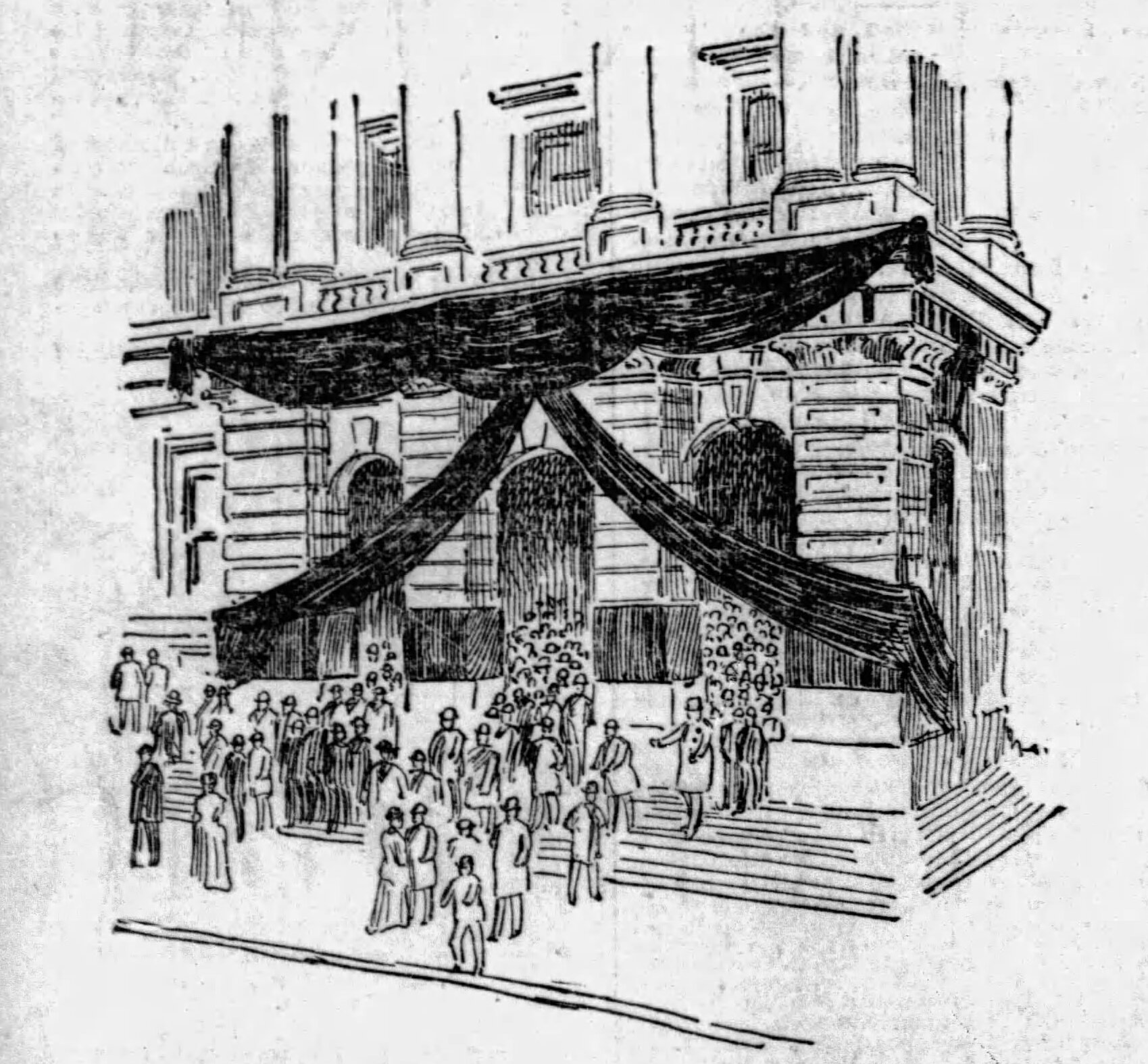
Illustration of a crowd of mourners entering through the LaSalle Street entrance to City Hall

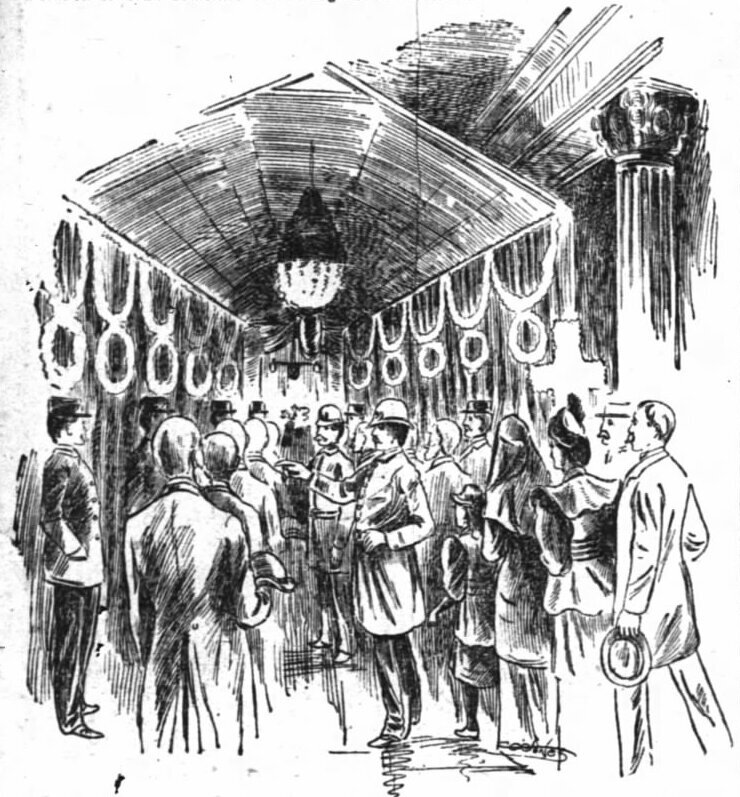
Illustration of a crowd queuing inside of the City Hall to visit the fallen mayor's remains

At the city hall remains were displayed in a heavy red cedar "state coffin", which featured a glass viewing window. A space was created for Harrison to be displayed at Chicago City Hall by partitioning off a section of a ground floor hallway. Harrison's coffin was placed in a black catafalque surrounded by flowers and black draping. The coffin was placed at the center of the catafalque, which was a raised carpeted platform that was walled-in on its sides. A temporary black arched roof was erected over the space. The space was filled by the sound of music, with intervals of the hymn "Lead, Kindly Light" being sung by quartets that stood in an adjacent space that was obscured from mourners' view by curtains .

During the time that Harrison lay in state, entrances to City Hall and most of the offices within the building were adorned by black drapes. Most work spaces within the building were closed for business except for offices whose uninterrupted operation was deemed absolutely necessary.

Vast numbers lined up outside the City Hall for hours to see Harrison's open casket. Estimate are that 100,000 individuals waited to view Harrison's remains while he lay in state, and 80,000 individuals managed to view them. It was reported as many as six thousand people were still waiting in line when the doors closed at the end of viewing, with those thousands unable to view the coffin due to the need for the funeral procession to begin.

== Funeral procession and services ==
The following day, Harrison's remains were given what Donald L. Miller later described as, "the most impressive funeral in the young city's history." Harrison's funeral was described as being, "of such proportions [never] before seen" for any previous funeral in Chicago's history. Schools were closed on the day of the funeral, and most places of business also voluntarily closed (including banks and the Chicago Board of Trade). Flags at major buildings in the city were flown at half-staff.

Harrison was given a massive and grand funeral procession, carrying his remains first to the Church of the Epiphany where a funeral service was held, and next to Graceland Cemetery where they were interred. The funeral procession was at such a large scale that it has been described as having "filled the city". It took two hours for the entire procession to pass by any one location. The great duration of the procession came even as an effort was made to keep its formation as compact as possible with military marching eight abreast, carriages being driven tightly three abreast, and society members being arranged to walk tightly together. The route that the procession took was intentionally meandering to accommodate viewing by vast crowds. The procession was met by thousands of spectating mourners dressed in black. Some estimates were that 500,000 or more spectators viewed the procession. Other estimates were that 1 million onlookers viewed the procession, while 60,000 participants marched in the procession. Many mourners wore buttons reading "Our Carter". The procession elicited strong emotional reactions from many Chicagoans in attendance. It was the described to be the "largest and most impressive" funeral in the city's history, with perhaps the largest procession to have ever passed through the city's streets.

By some newspaper accounts, the funeral was recognized to be the largest in United States history up to that time.

1,500 policemen were distributed throughout the procession route to handle crowd control. Despite these efforts, the immense size of the crowds led to some crowd crushes causing a number of women to faint, and a number of people to incur serious injury (with one being taken to the Cook County Hospital.

=== Procession to church ===
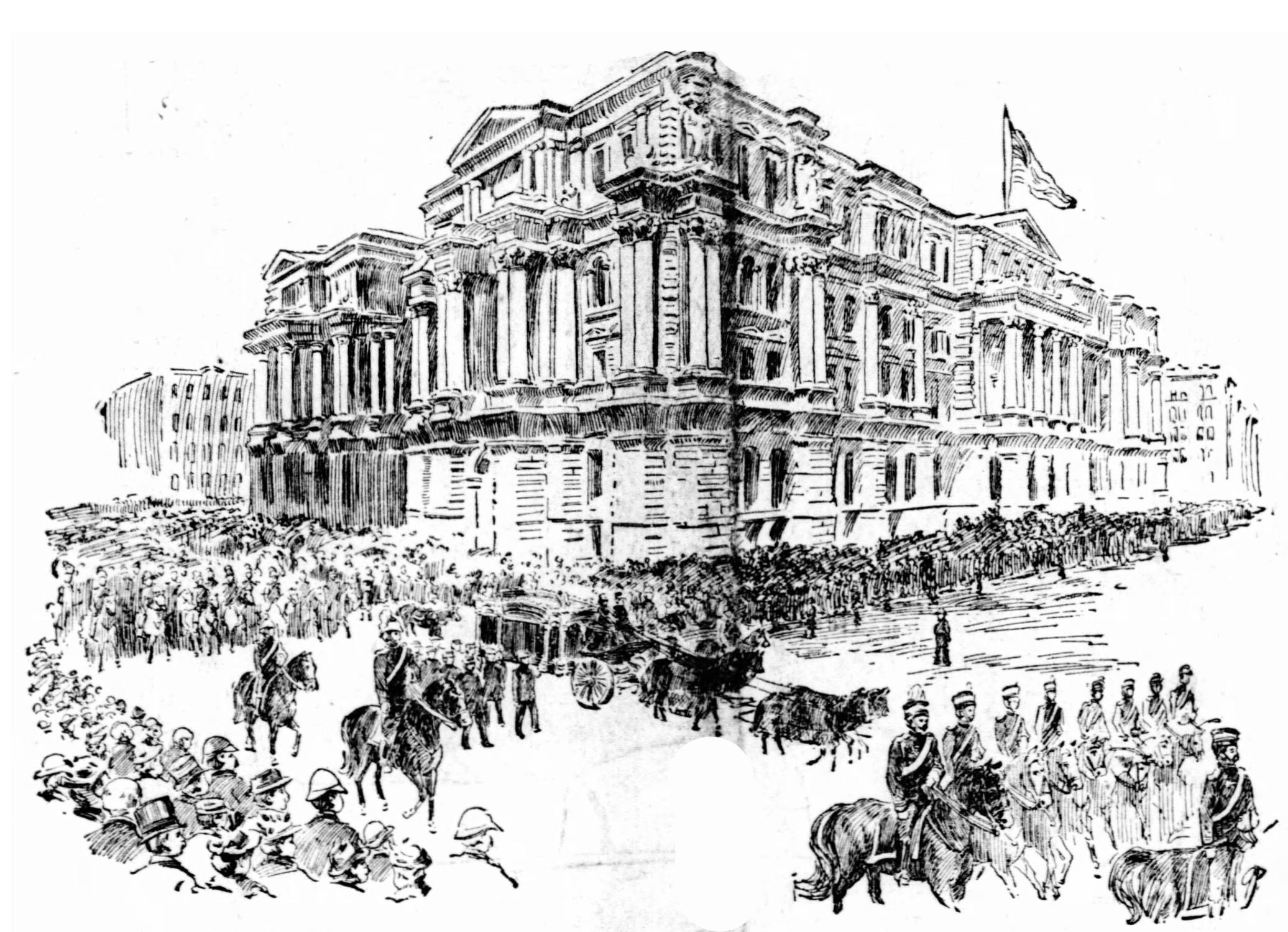
Illustration of the funeral procession leaving Chicago City Hall en route to the church

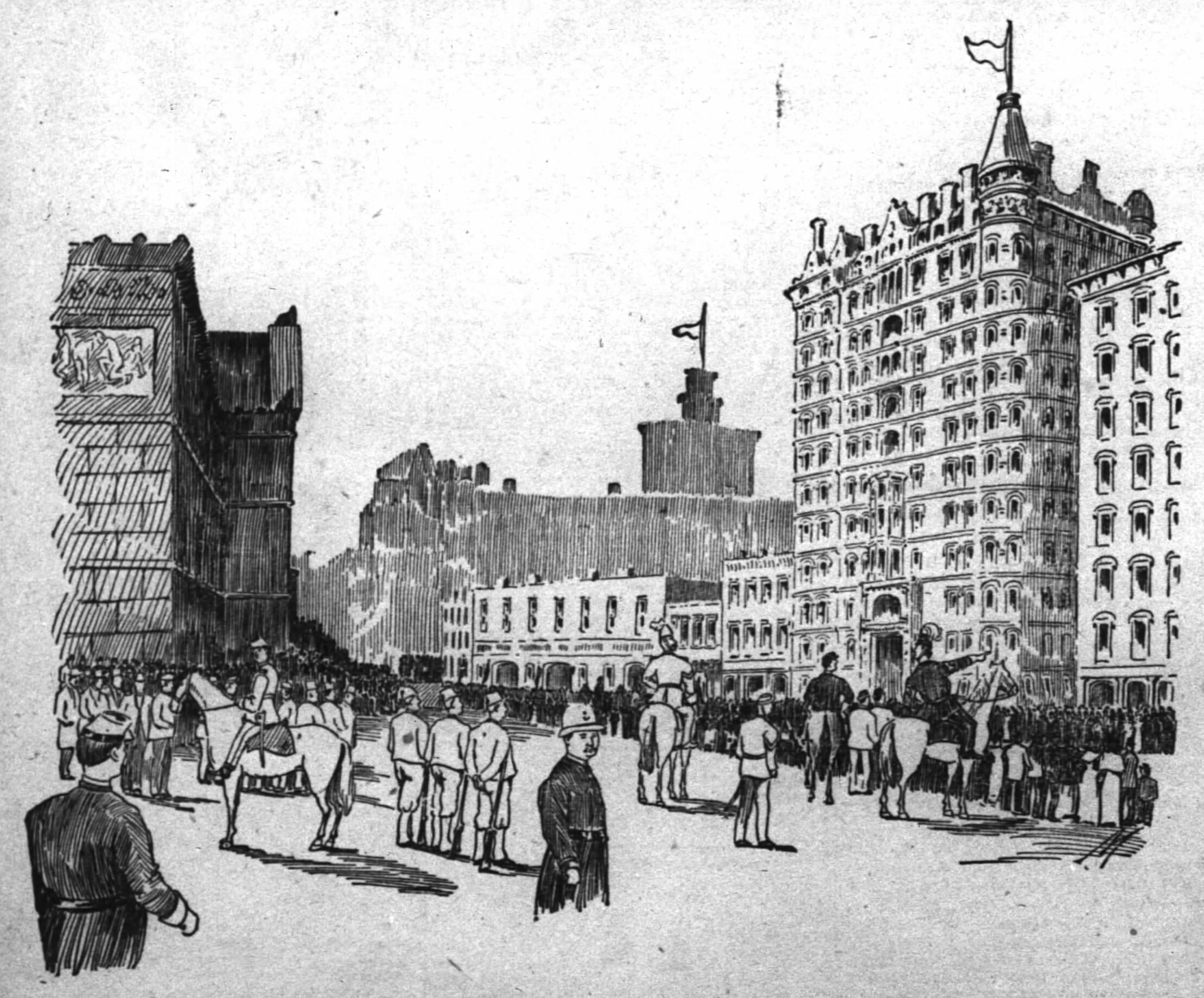
Illustration of the procession traveling down Michigan Avenue, with the (then-new) Art Institute of Chicago Building at the left and the Auditorium Building visible in the far back

The procession was led by a 150-member band. Several other bands were placed further back in the procession. Behind the black-draped hearse carriage that carried the catafalque with Harrison's remains was his personal thoroughbred horse, with her stirrups crossed over her empty saddle. One of Harrison's sons would later remark that nobody would ever again ride the horse after Harrison's death. Following behind the hearse were sixteen active pallbearers (eight police captains and eight fire captains).

The grand procession that followed behind the hearse included 600 carriages carrying family members, honorary pallbearers, distinguished current and former government officials, and members of various civic organizations. Among those in these carriages were prominent Chicagoans such Marshall Field, Daniel Burnham, and George Pullman. Further mourners marched behind the carriages, Among them were 1,500 uniformed men marched in the procession representing many social groups, military units, militias, municipal government agencies, trade unions, social fraternities, and other organizations. Among those following the hearse (either in carriage or on foot) were Governor Altgeld, city council members, current and former city officials, members of the Chicago Board of Education, members of the literary boards, Cook County officials, judges, representatives of the Chicago Bar Association, trustees of the Chicago Sanitary District, park commissioners, Illinois state officials, members of the World's Columbian Exposition board of commissioners, federal government officials, representatives of typographical unions, representatives from various civic societies, representatives from the Chicago Press Club and Chicago Newspaper Club; members of the Democratic and Republican party central committees; 2,000 city employees; representatives of various political clubs (affiliates of both the Democratic and Republican parties); representatives of German societies; representatives of singing societies; 2,000 representatives of Bohemian societies; 800 members of Catholic uniformed societies and other catholic organizations; Clan na Gael guard; members of the Ancient Order of Hibernians; representatives of Irish literary clubs; representatives of French Canadian society organizations; representatives of Norwegian society organizations; members of Italian society organizations; and general citizens.

A summary of the general order in which the procession was arranged was:

- Platoon of police
- Iowa state band
- Austin J. Doyle (chief marshal) and staff
- United States Army troops on World's Fair duty, commanded by General Nelson A. Miles and staff
  - 15th Regiment Band
  - 15th Infantry Regiment, commanded by Col. R. E. A. Crofton and staff
  - First Brigade of the Illinois National Guard, commanded by I. N. G. Brigadeer General H. A. Wheeler and staff
  - Elgin band
  - Chicago zouaves
  - Royal Scots, commanded by Col. James E. Stuart
  - Ninth Battalion Drum and Fife Corrps
- 125 Chicago Musical Union Band
- 100 Chicago Police Department officers in a battalion of four companies
- Chicago Fire Department officers in abatallion of four companies
- 125 piece band
- Chicago hussars, commanded by Capt. E. L. Brand
- Chicago City Council aldermanic honor guard
- honorary pallbearers (in carriages) (Note: Among the honorary pallbearers in the funeral were: Francis Adams, judge; Philip Danforth Armour, industrialist; C. K. G. Billings; Charles Fitzsimmons, general; Harlow N. Higinbotham, world's fair board president; M. J. Jones, comptroller; Adolph Kraus, Chicago corporation counsel; Nelson A. Miles, general; Joseph Medill, former mayor of Chicago and newspaper magnate; Richard James Oglesby, former governor of Illinois; Thomas W. Palmer, president of the National Commission of the World Columbian Exposition; Ferdinand Peck, businessman; John A. Roche, former mayor of Chicago; Lyman Trumbull, former senator and judge; R. A. Waller; Hempstead Washburne, former mayor of Chicago; Frank Wenter, president of the Chicago Sanitary District; F. W. Winston)
- catafalque (carrying Harrison's remains) and active pallbearers
- 8 police captains and 8 fire captains
- relatives and intimate friends of Harrison (in carriages)
- captains of police
- captains of fire companies
- engine companies and hook and ladder companies
- members of the City Council in carriages
- city officials in carriages
- former city officials in carriages, including former members of the City council
- members of the Chicago Board of Education in carriages
- current and former members of the Library Board, and other city officials
- members of the Cook County government and other Cook County officials in 30 carriages
- members of the Cook County Board of Commissioners
- current and former members of the judiciary (appellate courts, Cook County Superior Court, Cook County Circuit Court, probate and county courts)
- James H. Gilbert (sheriff of Cook County)
- county officials and county clerks
- members of the judiciary
- representatives of the Chicago Bar Association
- trustees of the sanitary district
- South Chicago Park commissioners
- West Chicago park commissioners
- Governor Altgeld and state officials
- Illinois board of world's fair commissioners
- federal government officials
- Times chapel of 40 men
- 100 carriages carrying committees from various civic societies
- Masonic organization, commanded by Colonel W. Barnard
- real estate board
- Illinois Republican Party Central Committee
- General Shields Memorial Committee
- Royal Arcanum
- Boys Friendly Society
- Iroquois Club Executive Committee and members
- Chicago Press Club
- Chicago Newspaper Club
- Division Marshal Capt. James H. Tyrel and staff
- Cook County Democratic Party, led by Captain Farrell
- 50 piece Pullman Company band
- James H. Farrell (marshal)
- 200 mourners on foot
- 200 letter carriers
- Robert H. Sampson (marshal in command)
- 2,000 city employees on foot
- 1st Ward Carter H. Harrison democratic club
- political organizations
- German societies, led by A. Ortelsefer
- Polish Societies, led by Peter Kielbassa
- Polish citizens and volunteer cavalry
- Queen's Polish guards
- St. Mary's hussars
- religious societies
- bishops and priests in carriages
- 2,000 from Bohemian societies, led by J. G. Panoch
- Irish societies, led by T. E. Ryan
  - Independent Order of Foresters
  - Catholic societies
  - Ancient Order of Hibernians
  - Clan na Gael guards
- church societies
- literary clubs
- French Canadian Society
- Scandinavian societies, led by Odd Fellows
- Italian societies
  - royal Italian commissioner and other prominent Italians in carriages
- general citizens (on-foot)

In the morning, viewing ended and Harrison's casket was taken outside of the City Hall and placed into an elaborate hearse. The initial procession to the Church of the Epiphany then began, taking several hours along an intentionally-circuitous route before reaching the church. The church was located near the late Harrison's personal residence.

=== Church service ===
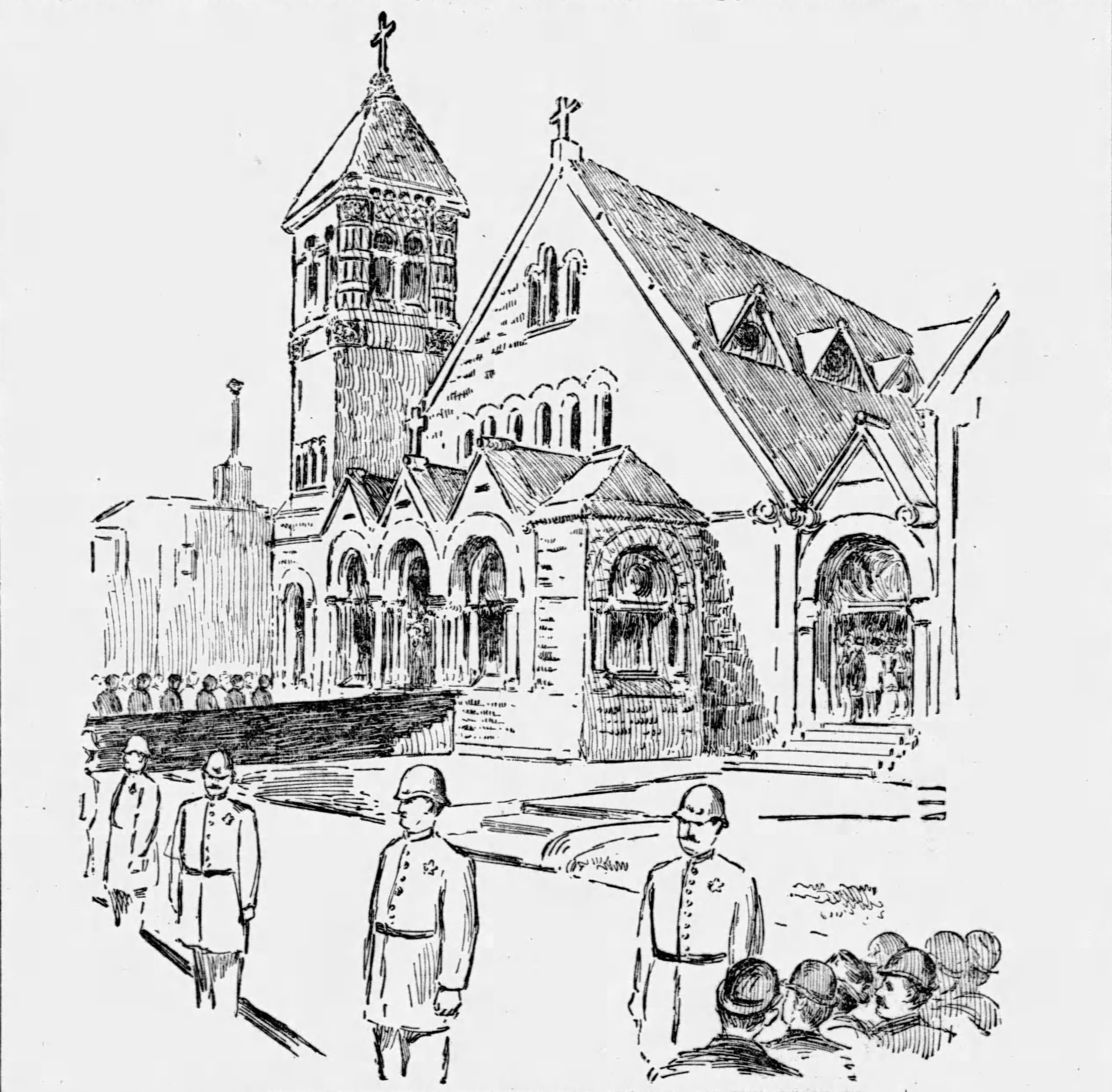
Illustration of Harrison's funeral arriving at the Church of the Epiphany

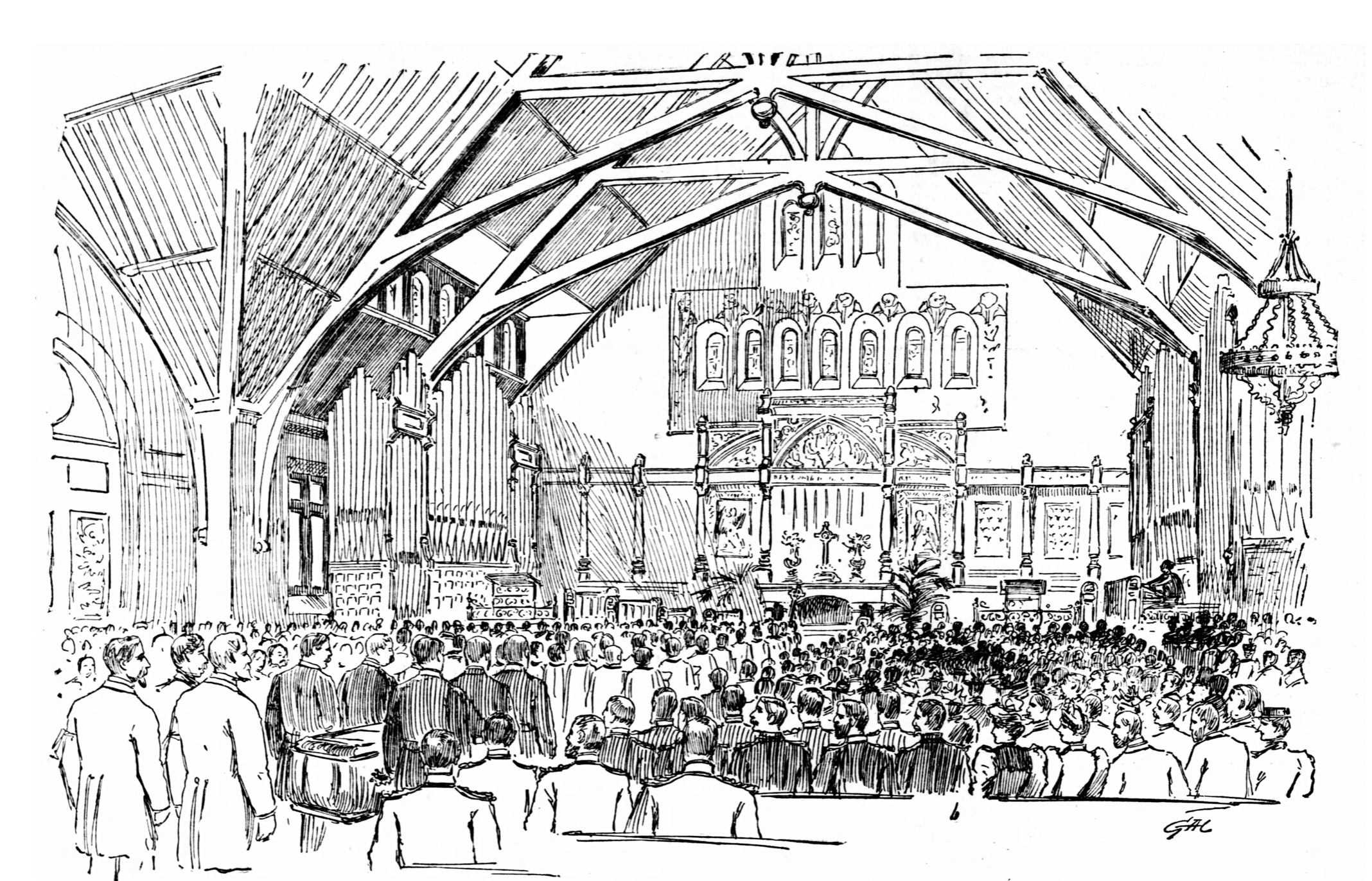
Illustration of Harrison's coffin being carried up the center aisle of the Church of the Epiphany during his funeral

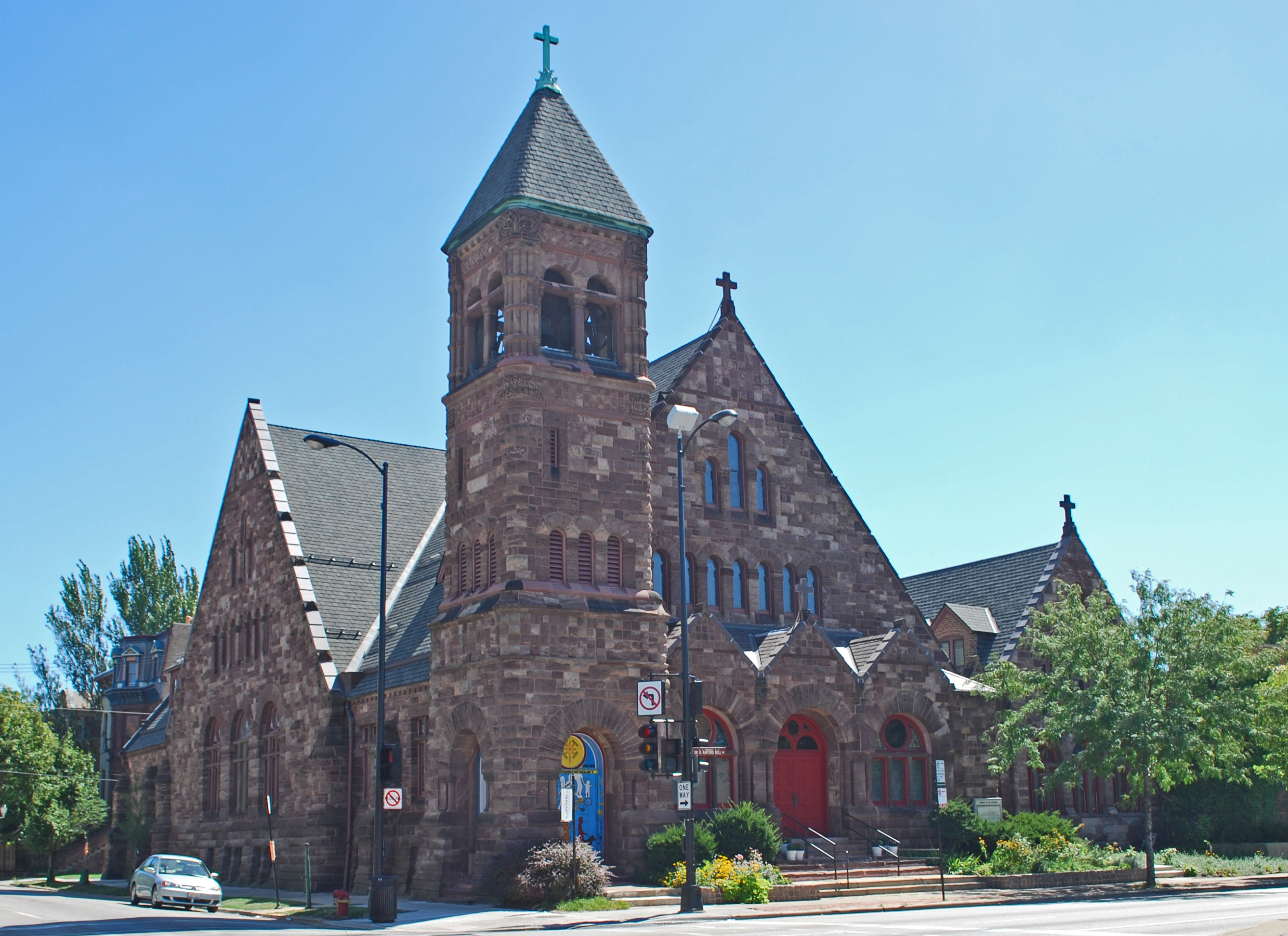
Church of the Epiphany (site of the service), photographed in 2010

After arriving at the Church of the Epiphany, the casket was brought into the church for a brief Episcopal service conducted at noon local time by Rev. Dr. T. N. Morrison Jr.

During the service, Annie Howard (who had been engaged to marry Harrison) broke into what was described as a "hysterical" crying fit being described as having "completely broke down". She was ushered out of the service and taken back to the Harrison residence where she was tended to by a physician. Reports described her as remaining "in a state of complete collapse" for the remainder of the day, but having recovered to a "better" state the following day. Additionally, Preston Harrison –son of the late mayor– fainted during the service and required medical attention.

=== Procession to cemetery and interment ===
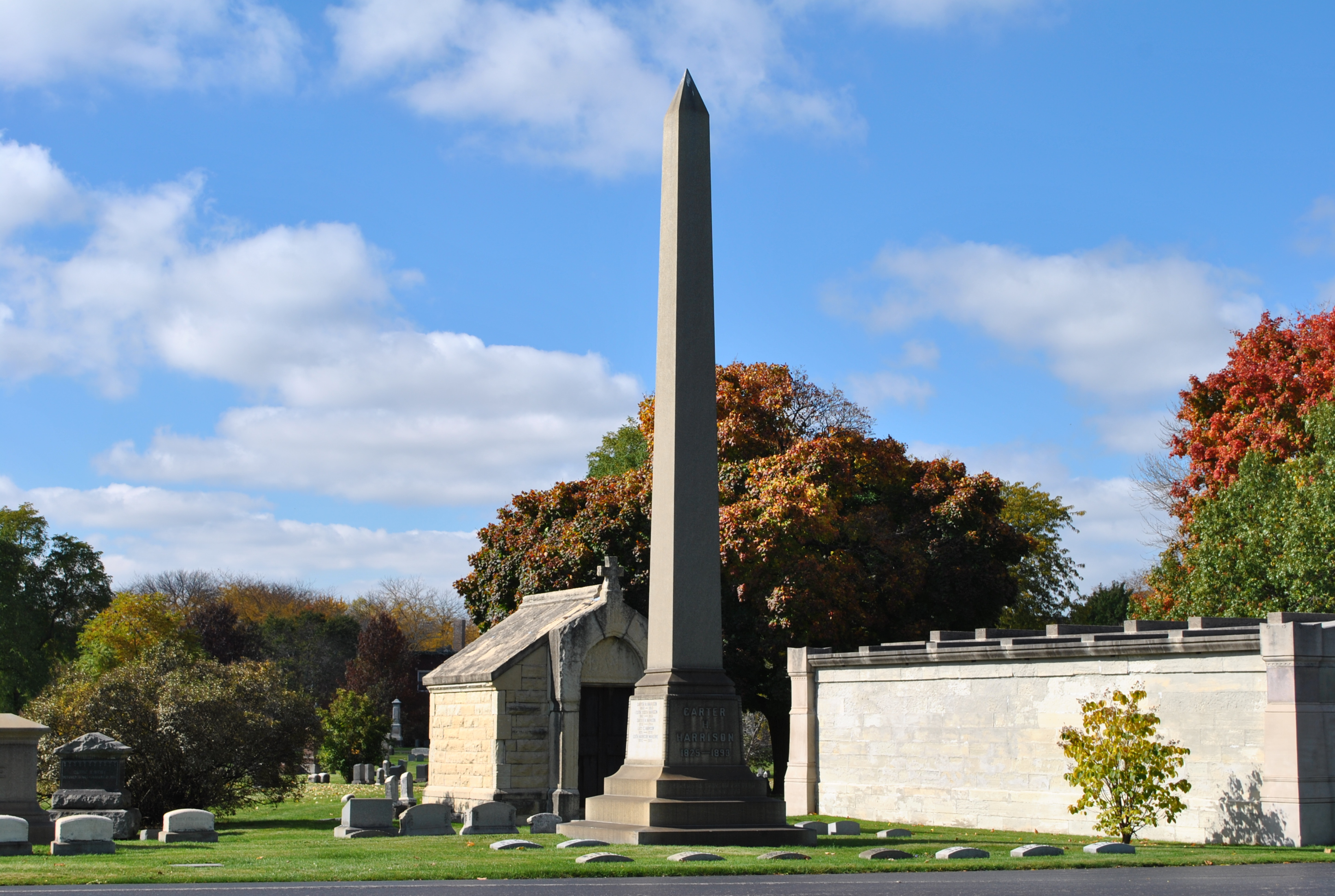
Harrison's tomb at Graceland Cemetery, photographed in 2014

After the service, the funeral procession resumed, traveling from the church to Graceland Cemetery. It took several hours for it to reach Graceland Cemetery.

The second leg of the procession was led by a platoon of police officers. The platoon was respectively followed in the procession by: the Iowa state band, police officer Austin J. Doyle (the "marshal of the day") and mounted aides; General Nelson A. Miles and his personal staff; department staff of army officers who were connected with the World's Fair; Colonel R. E. A. Crofton of Fort Sheridan and his staff; the 15th Infantry Regiment of the United States Army (stationed at Fort Sheridan); a U.S. Army light artillery battery; the First Brigade of the Illinois National Guard; Chicago Police Chief Michael Brennan and four companies of police; a battalion featuring four companies of the Chicago Fire Department; the Chicago Hussars; an aldermanic "guard of honor" featuring seven city council members; the honorary pallbearers; the funeral car and the active pallbearers (eight captains of the police and fire departments); followed by mourners in carriages.

A short service was held at the cemetery before the coffin was interred in a cemetery vault. Nine days later, the body was quietly moved into the Harrison family plot for its final burial.

== Observations in other cities ==
On November 1, the bell of the Scottish Rite of Masons Cathedral in Cincinnati, Ohio was rung in recognition of Harrison's funeral. This made Harrison only the third man for whom the cathedral's bell had rung funeral tolls. The previous two men for whom the church had rung funeral tolls had been former Union Army generals prominent in presidential politics: President Ulysses S. Grant and Senator John A. Logan. Thomas Francis Gilroy, the mayor of New York City, ordered that flags in New York City be lowered to half staff on November 1 in memory of Harrison.

== See also ==
- Trial of Patrick Eugene Prendergast
- Insanity proceeding for Patrick Eugene Prendergast
