= Mary Belle Spencer =

American lawyer

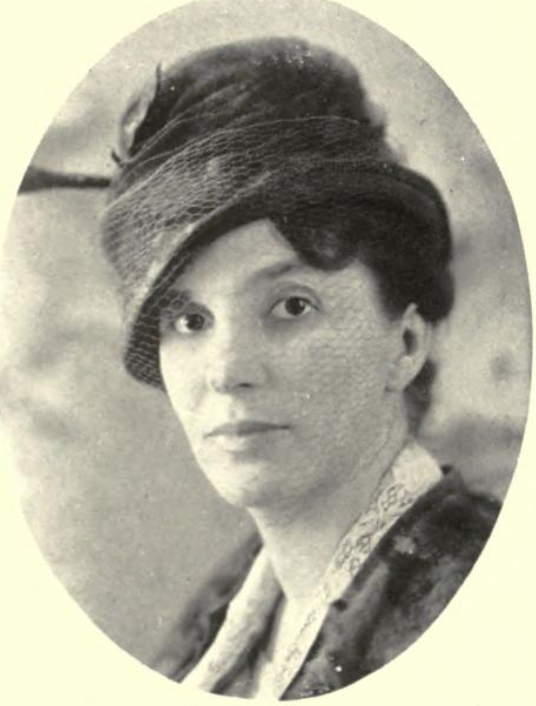
- Mary Belle Spencer, from a 1920 publication
- Born: Mary Belle Withrow; August 9, 1882; Platteville, Wisconsin, U.S.
- Died: July 1, 1942 (age 59); Chicago, Illinois, U.S.
- Occupation: Lawyer

Mary Belle Withrow Spencer (August 9, 1882 – July 1, 1942) was an American lawyer based in Chicago. Spencer was known for well-publicized lawsuits and opinions, and for her unconventional parenting choices.

== Early life and education ==
Mary Belle Withrow was born in Platteville, Wisconsin, the daughter of George Withrow and Mary Catherine Thurtell Withrow. She gained "highest honors" as a student at Chicago-Kent College of Law, and graduated from Northwestern University Law School. She was admitted to the Illinois bar in 1917.

== Career ==
Spencer was a Cook County Public Guardian from 1918 to 1921. In that role, she succeeded Nellie Carlin, and represented minors in juvenile court. She was also a trial lawyer; "the day before her baby was born she was in the court fighting a murder case," according to a 1920 account. She ran unsuccessfully for a Congressional seat in 1922. In 1926 she defended two prisoners who killed a warden at Joliet.

In 1933 Spencer sought an injunction to keep under-dressed women, including burlesque performer Sally Rand, from working at the Century of Progress world's fair in Chicago. Also in 1933, she published a 48-page booklet arguing that the Lindbergh kidnapping was a "stupendous hoax", and that the child died because of his parents' negligence. She later said the book was intended as satire on the police and the legal system.

Spencer's unconventional parenting of her two daughters was a matter of press interest, including Time magazine accounts of her daughter Mary Belle's bathing suit photos in 1934, and her elopement at 16, in 1936. Her daughter Victoria was briefly a "fan dancer", before she also married at 16.

== Personal life ==
Withrow married physician Richard Vance Spencer in 1910, and had two daughters, Victoria and Mary Belle. The Spencers were separated when he died in 1938, and she died in 1942, at the age of 59, in Chicago.
