= Mary Conway =

Mary Conway may refer to:

- Mary Margaret Conway, American political scientist
- Mary Vincent Conway (c. 1815–1892), Sister of Charity and educator
- Mary Brück (1925–2008), née Conway, Irish astronomer, astrophysicist, and historian of science
- Mary Conway Kohler (1903–1986), American lawyer and juvenile court judge
