= Alan Goldberg =

Alan Goldberg may refer to:

- Alan Goldberg (architect), American architect
- Alan Goldberg (judge) (1940–2016), Federal Court of Australia judge
- Alan E. Goldberg (born 1949), American Thoroughbred horse racing trainer

== See also ==
- Allen S. Goldberg, American judge
