= Circuit Court of Cook County =

Judicial circuit in Illinois, U.S.

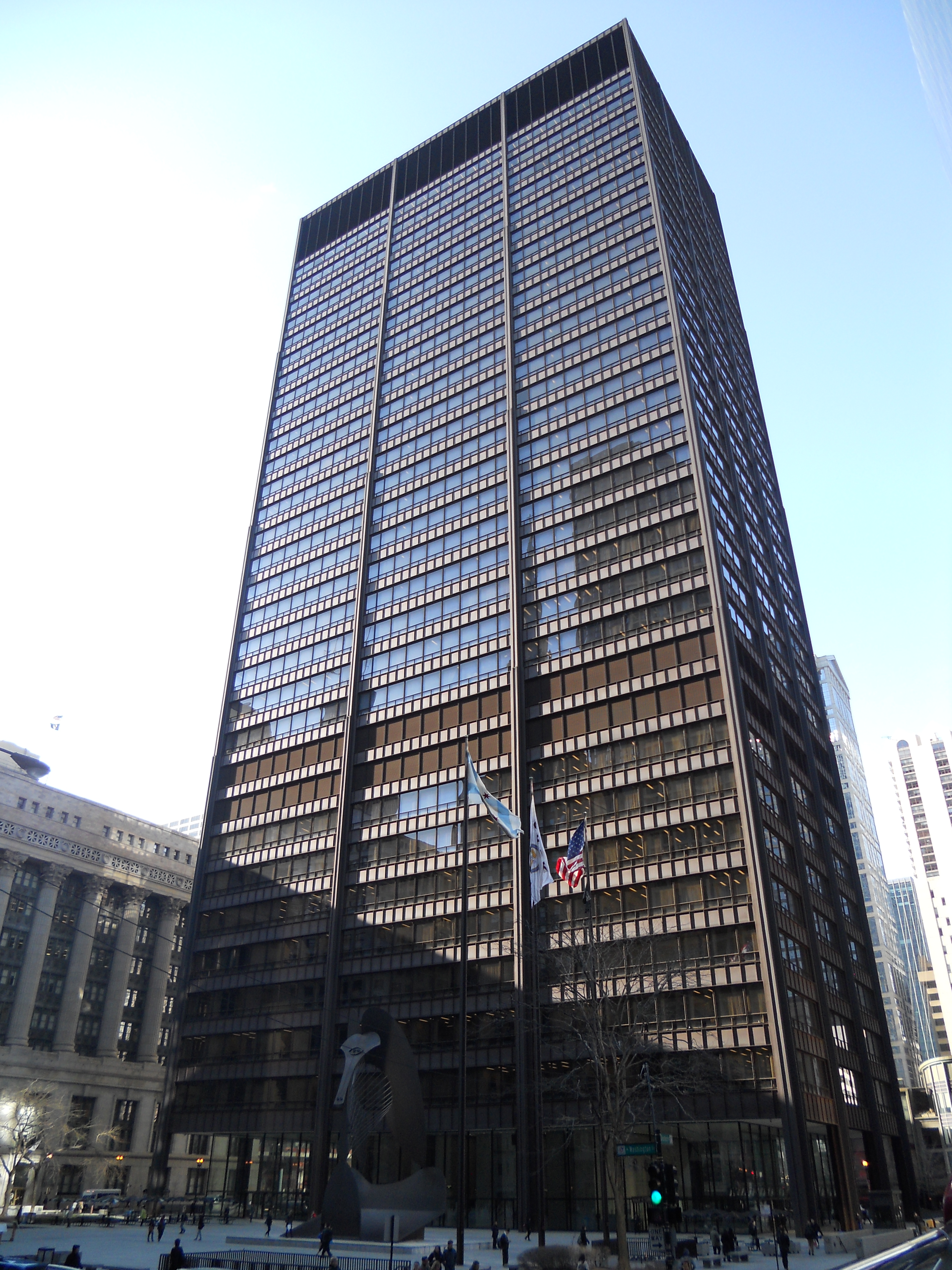
Daley Center is the central courthouse, and one of six courthouses for the County

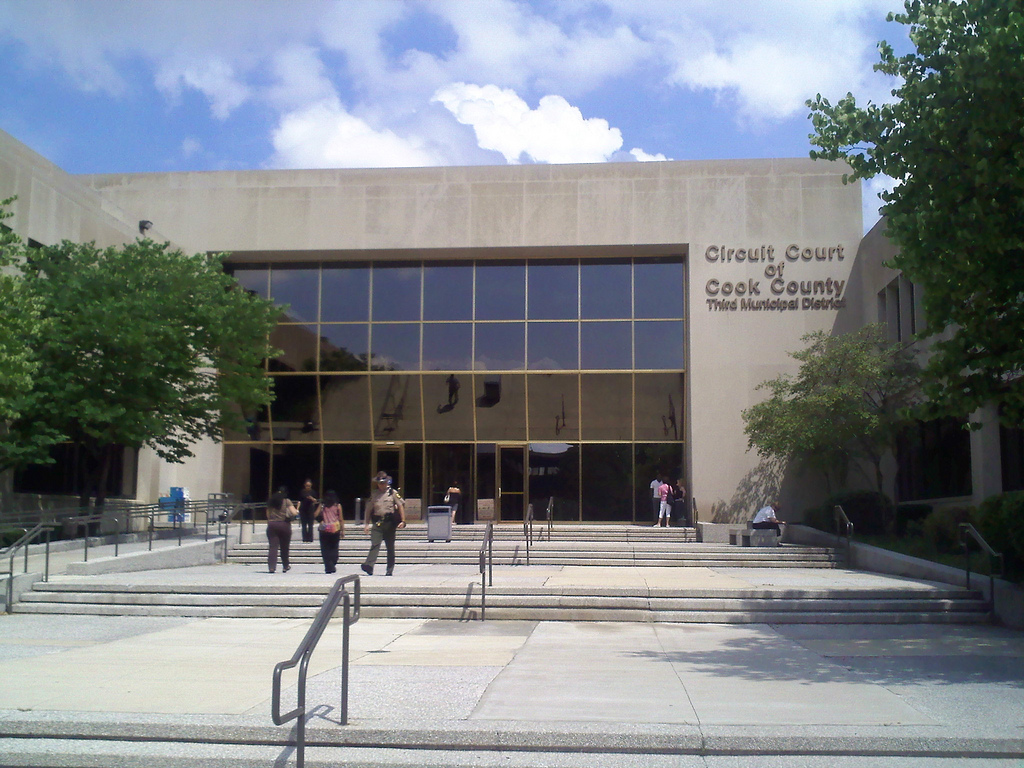
One of the Circuit Court's courthouses

The Circuit Court of Cook County is the largest of the 25 circuit courts (trial courts of original and general jurisdiction) in the judiciary of Illinois as well as one of the largest unified court systems in the United States – second only in size to the Superior Court of Los Angeles County since that court merged with other courts in 1998.

The modern Cook County Circuit Court was created through a 1964 amendment to the Illinois Constitution which reorganized the courts of Illinois. The amendment effectively merged the often confusing and overlapping jurisdictions of Cook County's 161 courts, which were organized as municipal courts (such as the Municipal Court of Chicago) and specialized courts, into one uniform and cohesive court of general jurisdiction, organized into divisions, under the administration of one chief judge.

More than 2.4 million cases are filed every year. To accommodate its vast caseload, the Circuit Court of Cook County is organized into three functional departments: County, Municipal, and Juvenile Justice and Child Protection.

As of December 2014, the court has 402 judges. Among them, 257 of the judges are circuit judges, who are elected for six-year terms either at-large from across the entire county, or from one of the court's 15 residential subcircuits. Circuit judges must be retained by voters every six years. The Illinois Supreme Court can fill circuit judge vacancies between elections. Any court-appointed judges must go before voters at the next available primary and general election in an even-numbered year.

As of December 2014, seven judges currently elected as circuit judges are instead serving as justices on the Illinois Appellate Court's First District through Supreme Court appointments. Should their term on the appellate court expire before their elected circuit court terms, they will revert to their old positions.

Another 145 judges are associate judges, elected by secret ballot among the court's circuit judges.

The circuit judges also elect among themselves a chief judge for the court, who provides administration for the court and holds the power to assign judges to various calls throughout the court. Circuit Judge Timothy C. Evans has served as chief judge since September 2001.

Mariyana Spyropoulos is the current Clerk of the Circuit Court of Cook County – a county-wide popularly elected position charged with managing the court's documents and related matters.

== Pre-1964 Circuit Court of Cook County ==
Before 1964, a different incarnation of the Circuit Court of Cook County coexisted with many other courts in Cook County.

== County Department ==
The County Department is divided into the following divisions: Law, Chancery, Domestic Relations, County, Probate, Criminal, Domestic Violence, and Elder Law and Miscellaneous Remedies. Each division is headed by a presiding judge. The types of cases heard in each division depend on the nature of the controversy.

=== Law Division ===
The Law Division hears civil suits for recovery of monetary damages in excess of $30,000 in the city of Chicago, and in excess of $100,000 in the suburban districts, as well as many types of administrative reviews. Cases heard include: personal injury and wrongful death, motor vehicle injury, medical malpractice, legal malpractice, product liability, intentional tort, construction injuries, commercial litigation, fraud, breach of contract, breach of warranty, employment security, property damage, premises liability, and miscellaneous remedies. As of January 2018, The Honorable Judge James P. Flannery Jr., is the presiding judge of Cook County's law division, and oversees all other judges within that division.

The vast majority of cases filed, litigated, and tried in Cook County's law division take place in the Daley Center, which sits in Chicago. The Daley Center is also known as the first municipal district. In 2016, it usually took an average law division case three years to run its course from the original complaint being filed to jury verdict. Also, because of the sheer number of cases filed within the Daley Center's law division, it is broken up into two sections: the motion section and the trial section.

As of 2018, 10 judges preside over the Law Division's motion section, which are all located on the Daley Center's 22nd floor. As of 2018, the Honorable Judge Kathy Flanagan is the supervising judge over the other judges presiding over cases within the Law Division's motion section. Simply distilled, the job of the judges presiding over cases within the Law Division's motion section is to oversee the attorneys handling the case to ensure that they are preparing the case for trial in a timely fashion. Another equally important duty the judges in the motion section have is to hear dispositive motions, oversee discovery disputes, and adjudicate critical questions of law that only arise before a case is transferred to a different judge in the law division's trial section. Those uninitiated and unfamiliar with practicing law in Cook County should be aware that almost all litigation concerning any given case predominantly takes place before the judge presiding over the case in the Law Division's motion section. To put this in perspective, an ordinary case will usually spend two years and 11 months being presided over by a motion section judge, before being transferred to a separate judge in the Law Division's trial section where a two-week trial before a jury will ensue.

As of 2018, 26 judges preside over the Law Division's trial section. While Judge James P. Flannery Jr. presides over all law division cases filed in Cook County, he is also the supervising judge overseeing all judges within the Law Division's trial section at the Daley Center. The job of judges presiding over a case transferred to that judge in the Law Division's trial section is to oversee the trial in the case. This includes adjudicating motions in limine, voir dire, the trial itself, and post-trial motions filed after the jury in the case has returned a verdict, if at all.

The Law Division includes Commercial Calendars, with eight assigned Commercial Calendar judges, one of whom acts as Supervising Judge (the Hon. Patrick J. Sherlock as of April 2024). The Commercial Calendars have specialized jurisdiction over commercial disputes, and function as a business court, though other kinds of business cases, for example dissolutions of partnerships and corporations, are subject to Chancery Division jurisdiction in Cook County. The Commercial Calendars represent one of the oldest specialized business court programs in the United States, created by order of the Court's President Judge in 1992, and became operational in 1993. In 1993, Judge Martin Ashman became the first Commercial Calendar judge. All Commercial Calendars are subject to a uniform standing order.

The Law Division has a court-annexed mediation program. Judge Allen S. Goldberg, who served as a Commercial Calendar Judge from 2000-2011, headed the committee that drafted rules for the Cook County Circuit Court Law Division's court-annexed mediation program.

Outside of the Daley Center, cases filed in Cook County's Law Division which take place at any of the other five municipal court houses in Cook County are usually presided over by a single judge who presides over the case's motions and the corresponding trial.

=== Chancery Division ===
The Chancery Division hears actions and proceedings, regardless of the amount of the claim, concerning a variety of matters. The division consists two sections: General Chancery Section and the Mortgage Foreclosure/Mechanics Lien Section. The General Chancery Section hears the following types of actions: injunctions, class actions, declaratory judgments, contract matters, creditors' rights, construction of wills and trusts, trusteeships, receiverships, dissolution of partnerships and corporations, statutory and administrative reviews, and vehicle impoundments, among others. The Chancery Court hears business cases that would fall within the jurisdiction of business courts in many states, which remain outside the Cook County Commercial Calendars.

The Mortgage Foreclosure/Mechanics Lien Section hears actions concerning the Mechanics Lien Act, liens on chattels for labor or storage, other lien remedies, and all actions and related proceedings initiated under the Illinois Mortgage Foreclosure Law.

=== Domestic Relations Division ===
The Domestic Relations Division hears matters concerning the family, including: dissolution of marriage, legal separation, invalidity of marriage, civil orders of protection, child support, child custody and visitation, parentage, and enforcement and modification of previously entered judgments in these matters. This division does not hear adoption or guardianship cases, which are heard in the County Division and Probate Division, respectively.

=== County Division ===
The County Division hears the following types of actions: adoption, marriage of minors, annexation and deannexation of land to a tax body, elections, inheritance taxes, mental health proceedings, real estate taxes, municipal organizations, and actions involving the forfeiture of seized property, name changes, and other matters the Circuit Court of Cook County has jurisdiction over but are not otherwise provided for.

=== Probate Division ===
The Probate Division hears matters concerning wills and administration of estates. Cases heard include: probate and contest of wills and testamentary instruments; claims against an estate arising in contract, tort or otherwise; administration of estates of decedents, disabled persons, minors and wards; contracts to make a will; construction of wills, and actions arising under the Illinois Power of Attorney Act.

=== Criminal Division ===
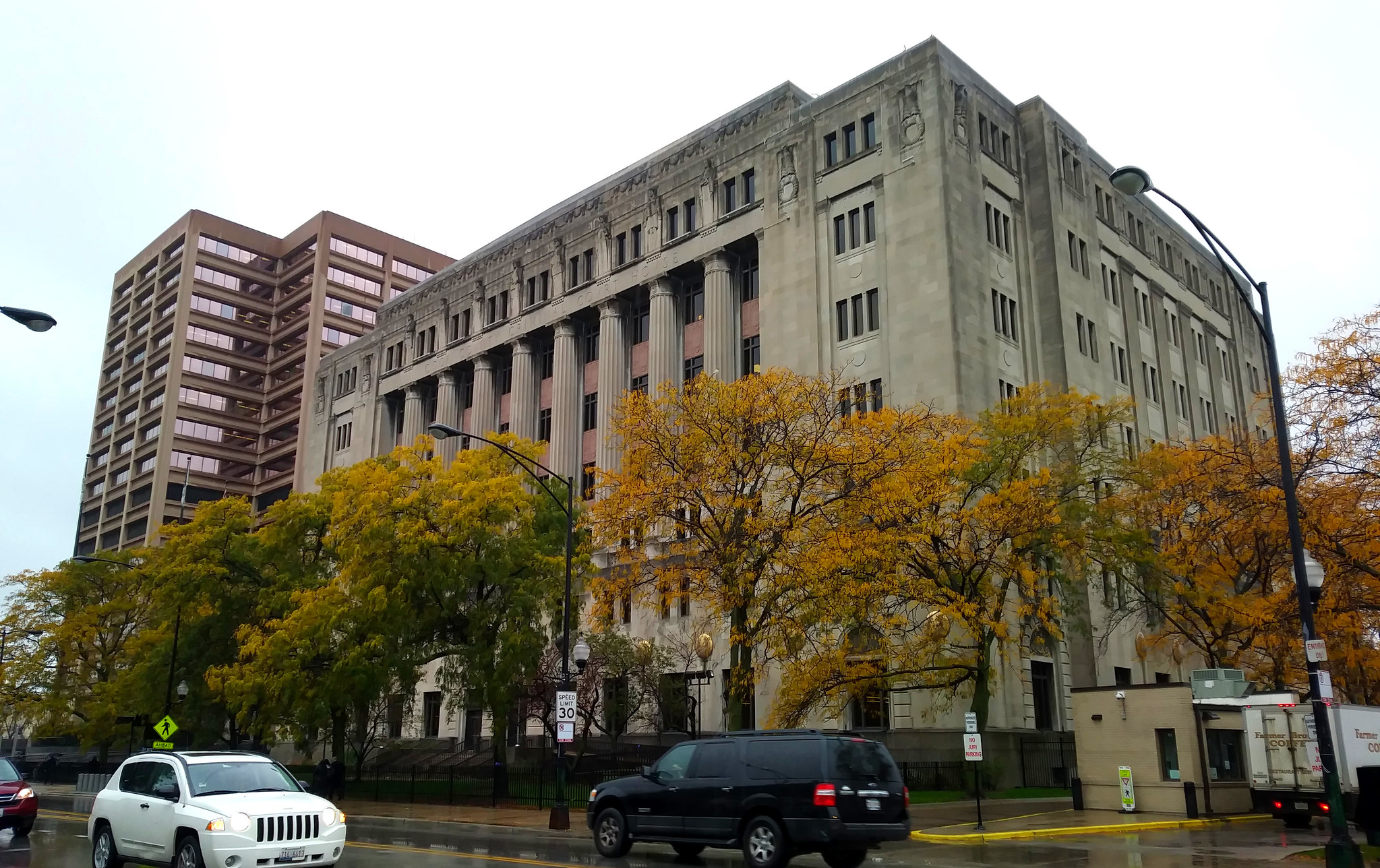
George N Leighton Courthouse, the circuit's criminal courts building for Cook County

The Criminal Division hears cases in which the State of Illinois alleges the commission of a serious criminal act (other than those heard by the Domestic Violence Division) such as armed robbery, assault, burglary, criminal sexual assault, murder, among others, generally involving jury trials. This division also hears actions regarding habeas corpus and extradition in criminal matters, and petitions to expunge records of arrest. The George N. Leighton Criminal Courts Building on the southwest side, in South Lawndale houses the Criminal Division. A rather elaborate neoclassical and art deco inspired high-rise built in the late 1920's, the criminal courts building was long known by just its cross-street location "26th and Cal" (26th Street and California Avenue) and has held many high profile cases. Often seen in films and television, it is located next to a modernist extension and the Cook County Jail. Prior to 1929, the Criminal Division was located at Courthouse Place in the Near North Side.

=== Domestic Violence Division ===
The Domestic Violence Division hears both civil and criminal actions involving issues of domestic violence. Some of the types of actions this division hears are: civil orders of protection, civil no contact orders, stalking no contact orders, and criminal actions involving relationships defined by the Illinois Domestic Violence Act.

=== Elder Law and Miscellaneous Remedies Division ===
The Elder Law and Miscellaneous Remedies Division hears actions and proceedings involving elderly persons. Some examples of the types of cases this division hears are: powers of attorney, cases arising under the Adult Protective Services Act, domestic violence cases involving elderly persons, and certain criminal matters in which an elderly person is the victim.

== Municipal Department ==
"The Municipal Department is divided into six geographic districts. Each district is supervised by a presiding judge. The First Municipal District encompasses the City of Chicago. Municipal Districts Two through Six encompass the communities in suburban Cook County.

The Municipal Department hears civil suits for damages up to $30,000 in the First Municipal District & up to $100,000 in Municipal Districts Two through Six, and less serious criminal matters. This Department hears the following types of cases: housing, eviction proceedings, small claims, licenses, misdemeanor criminal proceedings and felony preliminary hearings other than domestic violence matters, ordinance and traffic enforcement, contract cases decided by alternative dispute resolution process, and cases subject to mandatory arbitration, among others.

== Juvenile Justice and Child Protection Department ==
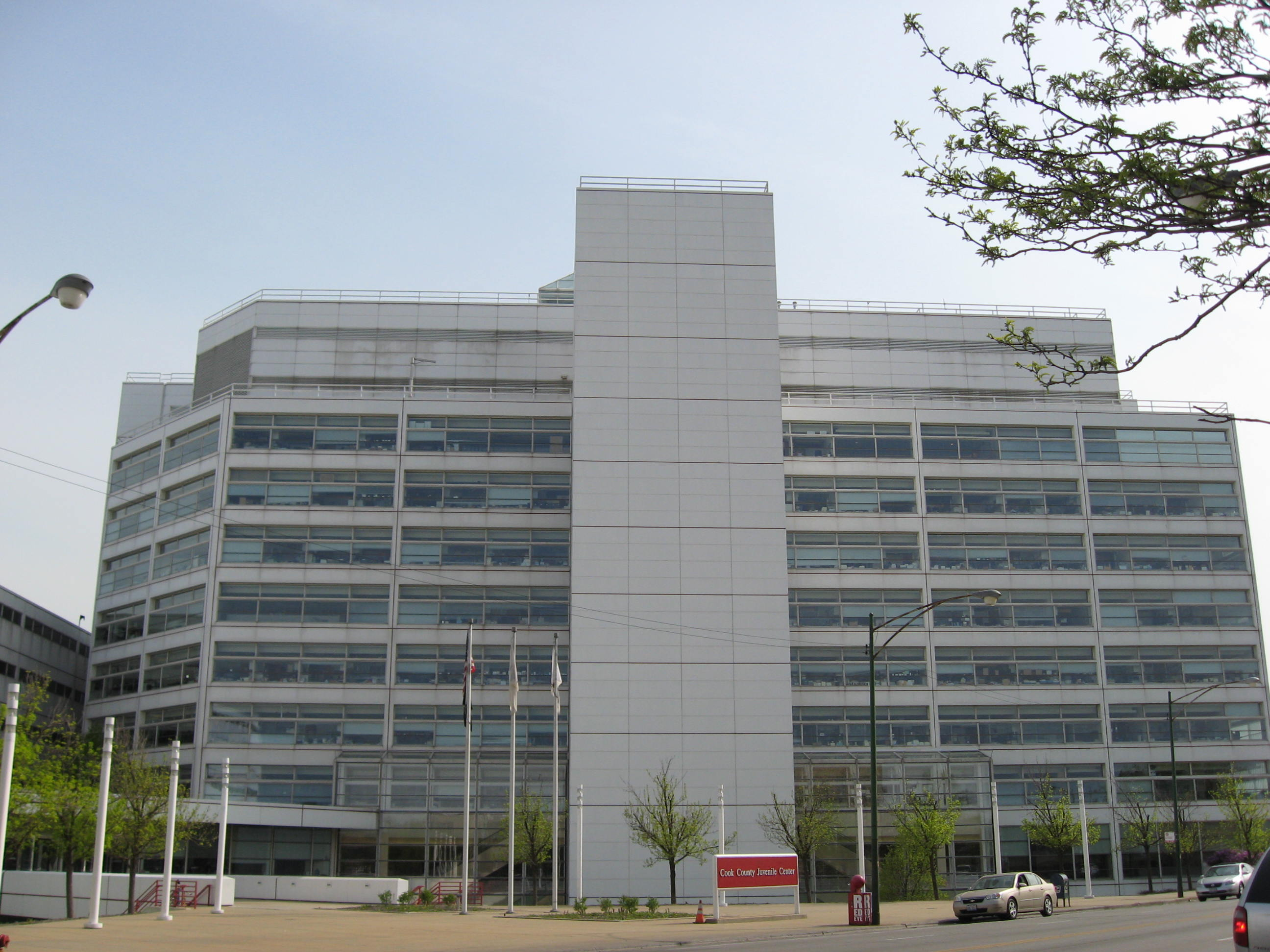
Cook County Juvenile Detention Facility and Courthouse

The Juvenile Justice and Child Protection Department is the Circuit Court of Cook County's newest department. Prior to its creation as a full-status department by then Chief Judge Donald P. O'Connell in January 1995, the Juvenile Justice and Child Protection Department was originally known as the Juvenile Justice Division and functioned as a part of the County Department. The establishment of the Juvenile Justice and Child Protection Department marked the first restructuring of the Circuit Court of Cook County in its 30-year history.

The department is divided into two divisions: Juvenile Justice and Child Protection. Each division is headed by a presiding judge.

The Juvenile Justice Division hears cases involving delinquent minors under 17 years of age. The Juvenile Justice Division also orders programs and services to rehabilitate these minors and monitors their progress through probation officers. Cases heard include: minors addicted to alcohol or other drugs, minors requiring authoritative intervention (runaways or those beyond the control of a parent, guardian or custodian), among others.

The Child Protection Division hears cases involving child abuse, child neglect, child dependency, private guardianship, and termination of parental rights.

The Juvenile Justice and Child Protection Resource Section serves as liaison to the academic, business and religious communities to identify and develop services and resources that will augment programs vital to juvenile justice. The section is supervised by an administrative presiding judge and is located in the Richard J. Daley Center.

The Cook County Juvenile Court was the first juvenile court established in the U.S., in 1899. During its first quarter century, its most important person was Mary Bartelme, whose official titles were Cook County Public Guardian and then (after 1913) assistant judge. Bartelme devoted much of her life to child welfare and the reform of juvenile laws, and became an associate justice in 1923 and presiding judge in 1927.

== Analysis and criticism ==
Accusations have been made of corruption in the Probate Division, resulting in a three-year suspension recommendation against the accusing attorney by the Illinois Attorney Registration and Disciplinary Commission.

== See also ==
- Cook County State's Attorney
- Cook County Sheriff's Office
