= Nellie Carlin =

American attorney (1864-1948)

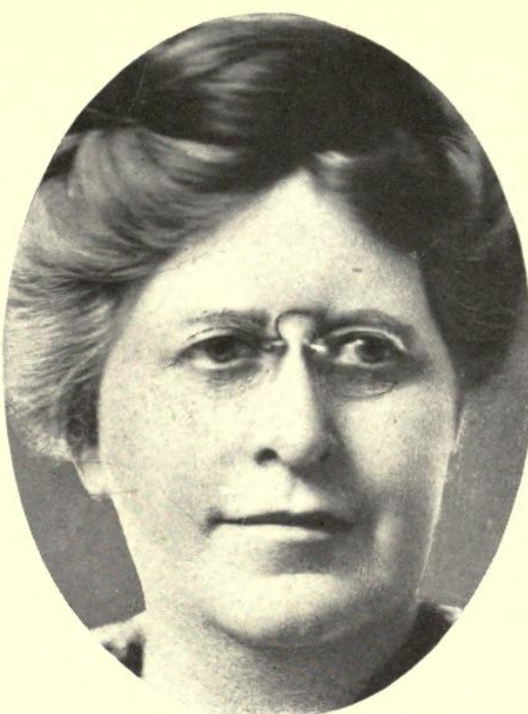
- Carlin, from a 1920 publication
- Born: June 24, 1864; Chicago, Illinois, U.S.
- Died: September 4, 1948 (aged 84); Miami, Florida, U.S.
- Occupations: Lawyer, suffragist

Nellie Carlin (June 24, 1864 – September 4, 1948) was an American attorney and suffragist based in Chicago. She was second president of the Women's Bar Association of Illinois and a vice-president of the National Women Lawyers Association. She succeeded Mary Bartelme as Cook County Public Guardian in 1913.

== Early life and education ==
Carlin was born in Chicago, the daughter of Stephen Carlin and Catherine Carlin. Her parents were both born in Ireland. She graduated from the Chicago College of Law in 1896, and was admitted to the bar that year.

== Career ==
Carlin was an associate of Clarence Darrow's law firm from 1896 until 1910. Two of the cases she worked on were wrongful death suits following the Iroquois Theatre fire in 1903 and another massive fire on Lake Michigan in 1909.

Carlin was an active member of the Illinois Equal Suffrage Association, and marched in the 1913 women's suffrage parade in Washington, D.C. She was a co-founder and the second president of the Women's Bar Association of Illinois and vice-president of the National Women Lawyers Association. She was an officer of the Women's Municipal Ownership League of Chicago. As co-founder and president of the Woman's Protective Association of Chicago, Carlin advocated for a farm colony for the "treatment and reformation" of women offenders in Chicago, where they would "be better fitted physically, mentally, and financially to resist temptations" and avoid the stigma of a jail term.

In 1913 she succeeded Mary Bartelme to become the second woman to serve as Cook County Public Guardian, appointed by Edward Fitzsimmons Dunne. She ran for municipal judge in 1914 and 1916. She served as Assistant Cook County State's Attorney from 1918 to 1919, after which she returned to private practice. She attended the first convention of the National Women Lawyers Association in Minneapolis in 1923. In 1924, she attended the conventions of the London Bar Association and American Bar Association, to report about the meetings for the Chicago Legal News.

== Personal life ==
Carlin raised her nephew, William L. Carlin, who followed her into the legal profession. She retired to Florida in the 1920s, and died in 1948, at her home in Miami, Florida, at the age of 84.
