= National Commission on Resources for Youth =

American non-profit promoting youth engagement in schools and communities

The National Commission on Resources for Youth (NCRY) was an American non-profit organization focused on youth engagement in the United States.

== Core Mission ==
Established in 1966 by New York City juvenile court judge Mary Conway Kohler, NCRY sought to advance the idea that young people should have opportunities to participate in activities that prepare them for constructive lives as adults, what NCRY called "youth participation." NCRY's work was one of the first national, systematic efforts to establish youth development programming in the after-school hours, during school and during summers.

With many Americans, NCRY's founders believed that too many young people were entering adulthood lacking the skills and commitment to live active, constructive lives, concerns that continue today. Changes in society including longer schooling, urbanization, and limited opportunities to work, reduce experiences that prepare young people for adulthood. NCRY helped schools and youth-serving agencies create activities that include experiences to do work that benefits others, take responsibility for planning and executing projects and collaborating with other youth and adults in activities that improve communities.

== Leadership ==
Under the leadership of Judge Kohler, NCRY was established by the efforts of a group of influential men and women who had long been concerned about the development of young people. Ultimately, they comprised the board of directors of NCRY. The group included among others a former commissioner of the US Department of Education (Francis Keppel), the president of the Carnegie Corporation (John Gardner), the leader of the team that built the first IBM computers (Charles DeCarlo), the founder of the Gallup Poll (George Gallup) and the creator of the leading work in educational research (Ralph Tyler).

== Understanding Youth Participation ==
Working with members of its board of directors, NCRY staff and the guidance of young people and those running programs, NCRY developed the following criteria for youth participation:

- Young people participate in projects that address genuine needs in their community and/or school.
- Their actions are challenging to them and make a difference to others.
- Young people participate in planning and decision-making that affects other people. They work in partnership with other youth and/or adults.
- There are opportunities for critical reflection by youth about what they are doing.

== Projects ==
NCRY's projects were supported locally by school districts and community organizations. National support came from the US departments of Labor and of Health, Education and Welfare with additional funding from the Ford Foundation and other private philanthropies. In addition to publications and studies on a range of youth participation topics, NCRY conducted meetings, training events and conferences across the country. The Commission succeeded in seeding a wide range of efforts both locally and nationally.

== Closure and Legacy ==
When founder Mary Conway Kohler retired in 1982, NCRY ended operations as an independent organization when they merged with the Boston-based Institute for Responsive Education. Although the commission dissolved, its impact endured. Kohler synthesized NCRY's core philosophies in her 1983 book, Young People Learning to Care: Making a Difference Through Youth Participation. NCRY's pioneering publications and frameworks, including Youth Tutoring Youth, were absorbed into broader educational movements and continued shaping service-learning, positive youth development, and school-community partnerships.

== Publications by the Commission ==
- Conrad, D.E. (1982, May). Learning from the Field Experience: A Guide for Student Reflection in Youth Participation Programs. New York, NY: The National Commission on Resources for Youth.
- Conrad, D., with D. Harrington. (1981, May). Thinking about the Work Experience: A Manual for Learning and Reflection in Youth Employment Programs. New York, NY: The National Commission on Resources for Youth.
- National Commission on Resources for Youth. (n.d.). "Kids Can Do Wonderful Things." Resources for Youth Newsletter, VI(I).
- National Commission on Resources for Youth. (1982, Fall). "These Young People Care!" Resources for Youth Newsletter, XI(I).
- National Commission on Resources for Youth, United States (1974) 'New Roles for Youth in the School and the Community,' New York: Citation Press.
- National Commission on Resources for Youth. (1979). "What If..." Resources for Youth Newsletter, IX(II).
- National Commission on Resources for Youth. (n.d.). 'Youth into Adult: Towards a Model for Programs that Facilitate the Transition to Adulthood.' New York, NY: National Commission on Resources for Youth.
- National Commission on Resources for Youth. (1970). You're the Tutor. New York, NY: National Commission on Resources for Youth.
- National Commission on Resources for Youth. (1970). For the Tutor. New York, NY: National Commission on Resources for Youth.
- National Commission on Resources for Youth. (1970). Tutoring Tricks and Tips. New York, NY: National Commission on Resources for Youth.
- National Commission on Resources for Youth. (1975, December). Youth Participation: A Concept Paper. A Report of the National Commission on Resources for Youth to the Department of Health, Education and Welfare, Office of Youth Development. New York, NY: National Commission on Resources for Youth.
- Schine, J., with B. Shoup & D. Harrington. (1981). New Roles for Early Adolescents. New York, NY: The National Commission on Resources for Youth.
