= St. Gregory Episcopal School (Chicago) =

Defunct Episcopalian school in Chicago, IL, USA

Coordinates: 41°51′8.7″N 87°42′55.3″W

- United States

Information
- Religious affiliation(s): Episcopal
- Established: 1962

St. Gregory Episcopal School was established in 1962 by the Rev. R. L. Whitehouse and Gordon L. Baker. Its founders envisioned a liturgical and educational institution patterned after the all-male English Cathedral choir schools, but situated within the urban context of Chicago. Founded as an outreach ministry of the Episcopal Church of the Epiphany, the school shared space within the church and its parish hall until August 2002. Enrollment was necessarily small (under 30) given the limited amount of space.

In August 2002 St. Gregory's moved to the former Blessed Sacrament School building in Chicago's North Lawndale community. With the additional space at this new location, the school was able to add a kindergarten class, thus satisfying a long-term objective. The move also provided room for a computer lab, a library, a lunchroom, and a small parking lot that doubles as a playground.

On June 30, 2010 it merged with Holy Family School and Ministries in the North Lawndale Homan Square neighborhood.
