= Allen S. Goldberg =

American judge

Judge, Circuit Court of Cook County, Chicago, Illinois
- In office 1993–2013
- Succeeded by: Jerry Esrig

Personal details
- Education: University of Illinois (B.A. 1964); DePaul College of Law (J.D. 1967)

Allen S. Goldberg is a retired American judge who served on the Circuit Court of Cook County, Illinois for 20 years. He headed the creation of a court-annexed mediation program in the Circuit Court, and also served as a business court judge in the Law Division's Commercial Calendar.

== Judicial service ==
Goldberg was elected as a judge to the Circuit Court of Cook County, Chicago, Illinois in 1992, and reelected in 1998, 2004, and 2010. He retired in 2013. The Circuit Court of Cook County is a state trial level court of general jurisdiction. Goldberg served in the circuit court's Domestic Relations Division for seven years. He spent 10 years as a Commercial Calendar judge, and in his final years on the bench, he handled jury trials in the circuit court's Law Division. Goldberg was succeeded by Jerry Esrig.

The Commercial Calendar is a specialized business court within the circuit court's Law Division, with a jurisdiction focused solely on commercial disputes. It is one of the oldest business court programs in the United States, having first become operational in 1993. Goldberg served as a Commercial Calendar judge from 2000 to 2011.

Nationally, Goldberg is a past president of the American College of Business Court Judges, and in 2005 he participated in the first meeting of the American College of Business Court Judges, co-sponsored by the Brookings Institution and American Enterprise Institute. He served as a Business Court Representative to the American Bar Association's Business Law Section.

A court-annexed civil mediation program was created in the Cook County Circuit court's Law Division in 2004. Goldberg "led a 60-member committee that spent more than nine months drafting rules governing mediation." In 2005, Circuit court Judge Michael S. Jordan, chair of the Illinois State Bar Association's Section on Alternative Dispute Resolutions, stated that the court-annexed mediation program was under Goldberg's supervision and responsibility. That program still exists (as of August 2024), and is made available to a variety of different case types actionable in the Law Division, providing the litigants with an "opportunity to explore settlement alternatives with a highly trained and experienced mediator."

Among examples of notable cases in which Goldberg presided as judge: a suit by singer James Brown against Corbis Corp., a company founded by Bill Gates, over the use of Brown's photos on the internet, an election fraud dispute brought by Jesse L. Jackson, Jr., a dispute between Archipelago Holdings Inc. founder and Chief Executive Gerald Putnam and Fane Lozman, a suit between the Chicago Transit Authority and American Bus Industries, Inc. over the sale of hundreds of allegedly defective buses, and a retaliatory discharge suit by Paul Liska against Motorola, Inc.

== Legal practice ==
After graduating law school, Goldberg spent a short time in private legal practice before joining the Legal Aid Bureau of the Office of Economic Development until 1970. He next went to work for the Cook County Public Defender's Office, where he spent 21 years. He eventually became chief of its felony trial division. As head of the felony division, he supervised 150 lawyers.

== Education ==
Goldberg received a Bachelor of Science degree from the University of Illinois in 1964, and a Juris Doctor degree from DePaul University College of Law in 1967.

== Positions and honors ==
Goldberg has served in the following positions or received the following honors, among others;

- President, American College of Business Court Judges
- Chair, Civil Practice and Procedure Section Council, Illinois State Bar Association
- President, North Suburban Bar Association
- Business Court Representative, American Bar Association Business Law Section
- Member, Section Council, Illinois State Bar Association Section on Alternative Dispute Resolution
- L. Sanford Blustin Award, North Suburban Bar Association
