= Mary Conway Kohler =

American juvenile court judge (1903–1986)

- Mary Conway Kohler in 1925
- Born: Mary Conway; 1903; Oakland, California
- Died: May 3, 1986 (aged 82)
- Occupations: Lawyer; Juvenile court judge
- Known for: Child welfare advocacy; Advisory to the Tweed Commission
- Notable work: Young People Learning to Care

Mary Conway Kohler (1903–1986) was an American lawyer and juvenile court judge. She was an advocate for young people. She worked in San Francisco, California and then in New York. Initially She focused on those who were caught up in the courts. Later, she addressed the needs of all American youth. She founded the National Commission on Resources for Youth and worked as an advisor to many different commissions, foundations and units of government.

== Early life and education ==
Mary Conway was born in Oakland, California. She married John Kohler in 1926. They had three children.

She earned her A.B. from Stanford University and was among the first women to graduate from Stanford Law School in 1928.

== Career ==
After graduation, Conway Kohler went on to become an Officer in the Juvenile Court in San Francisco. Later, she was promoted to Chief Probation Officer (1931–1932) before becoming a Juvenile Court Judge in 1932, a position she held until 1948.

=== Commission work ===
The New York State Temporary Commission on the Courts, known as the Tweed Commission (1953–1959), had been established to develop plans for the reorganization of the New York Court System and the new Family Court for New York State. Kohler was hired as a consultant to the commission. In an article she wrote while working for the Tweed Commission, she states her views about improving the experience for incarcerated youth: "... experience has shown that harsh sentences are not necessarily a deterrent to crime and that a large number of young people who come before the courts cannot and do not profit from such handling. Nor does the public profit from it." In 1963, The New York Times cited her influence on the commission: "Her recommendations led directly to the recent creation of [some] Family Court reforms ..."

The Ford Foundation hired Conway Kohler to examine why in Europe there was less delinquency than in the US. As a result of her research, she and a collaborator wrote a series of articles for The Saturday Evening Post. These compared youth employment and delinquency in the US and abroad. They attributed numerous factors to the differences, such as the provision of work experience and often better support services for youth in Europe.

The articles were displayed prominently in the magazine and read widely. Around the same time, The American Bar Association appointed Kohler to chair its Committee on Juvenile Laws and Procedure.

In 1961, Kohler was appointed the first director in New York City of the Neighborhood Youth Corps, a United States Department of Labor program that still provides paid work experience for thousands of adolescents from economically disadvantaged families. In 1963, Mayor Robert Wagner appointed her to the NYC Board of Education.

=== Committee on Youth Employment ===
In February 1963, addressing the growing national concern about delinquency and the lack of jobs for young people, President John F. Kennedy proposed significant new resources in a speech to Congress: "My Committee on Youth Employment ... has reported to me that the immediate need for additional youth employment opportunities is critical."

Kennedy engaged leaders in business and government to serve on the committee and Conway Kohler was appointed chair of the executive committee. Kennedy's proposals resulted in funding for 55,000 youth to serve in the new Youth Conservation Corps and for other youth to be paid to work in organizations that served in what the President called, "hard hit slums or rural poverty areas."

== National Commission on Resources for Youth ==
Starting in 1966, Conway Kohler brought together a group of prominent educators, social scientists and business leaders who were to establish and become the board of the National Commission on Resources for Youth (NCRY) which she directed until her retirement in 1982. (Note: For a list of the initial board members see: National Commission on Resources for Youth (1974). "Acknowledgements". New Roles for Youth in School and Community. Citation Press.) NCRY sought to address the increasing difficulty young people faced in making the transition from adolescence to constructive adulthood.

NCRY designed and promoted what it called "youth participation", an approach to youth programs and education in which young people address genuine challenges in communities and schools. Its work was an early effort to place youth development programming throughout school and non-school hours. From its office in New York City, NCRY identified hundreds of programs in schools and community centers throughout the country in which young people had significant roles. It developed and guided a network of skilled observers to document these programs. Drawing from what it learned, NCRY developed a model for what a youth participation program should include: youth should identify genuine needs in a community or school, develop projects to address these needs, work as partners with adults, make decisions, and reflect on the work.

NCRY seeded youth participation programs throughout the country. To support this effort it created publications, training manuals and protocols, films, and offered onsite assistance. Kohler and members of her board reached out to state and national policy makers, business people and private funders encouraging them to support youth participation. Additionally, NCRY developed two models of its own: Youth Tutoring Youth (YTY) and the Day Care Youth Helper Program. YTY was more fully developed and is described in the book, Children Teach Children.

With NCRY's training and materials support, YTY demonstrations were conducted in 1967 and 1968 in Philadelphia and Newark for 14 and 15 year olds in after-school and summer projects. Following an encouraging assessment, they were expanded to 15 additional cities. The demonstration that young people, often from poor families, could teach others was compelling and led to YTY's wide adoption. NCRY encouraged the development of a variety of funding sources in the federal departments of Education, Labor and Health, Education and Welfare, as well as local and private sources. In New York City Schools alone, there were more than 100 projects serving 4500 tutees with 1500 tutors.

One of the most thorough evaluations was conducted in the Ontario-Montclair, California School District in 1969–1970. The district compared participating students in middle and elementary school with those who did not participate in its YTY program. It determined that there were increases in reading scores as well as in self-concept. Other promising areas were in discipline and attendance. While the improvements were small, they were consistent among age groups.

== Advocacy and legacy ==
Through her speeches and writing, Conway Kohler advocated constructive pathways from adolescence to adulthood, both in schools and programs outside of school. She is described speaking to teachers in a school in St. Paul, Minnesota: "Judge Kohler mesmerized people. She told stories, ... she appealed to the very best in each of us, and the response was incredible. She helped [the teachers] understand their own importance and the value in helping youngsters feel productive and capable."

Kohler, her board members and other allies influenced people in leadership roles in government, business and education. Her book, Young People Learning to Care describes her efforts to provide opportunities for caring and meaningful contributions by young people.

Conway Kohler died in 1986 of cancer at the age of 82.

== See also ==
- Mary Bartelme
