= Mary Bartelme =

American lawyer

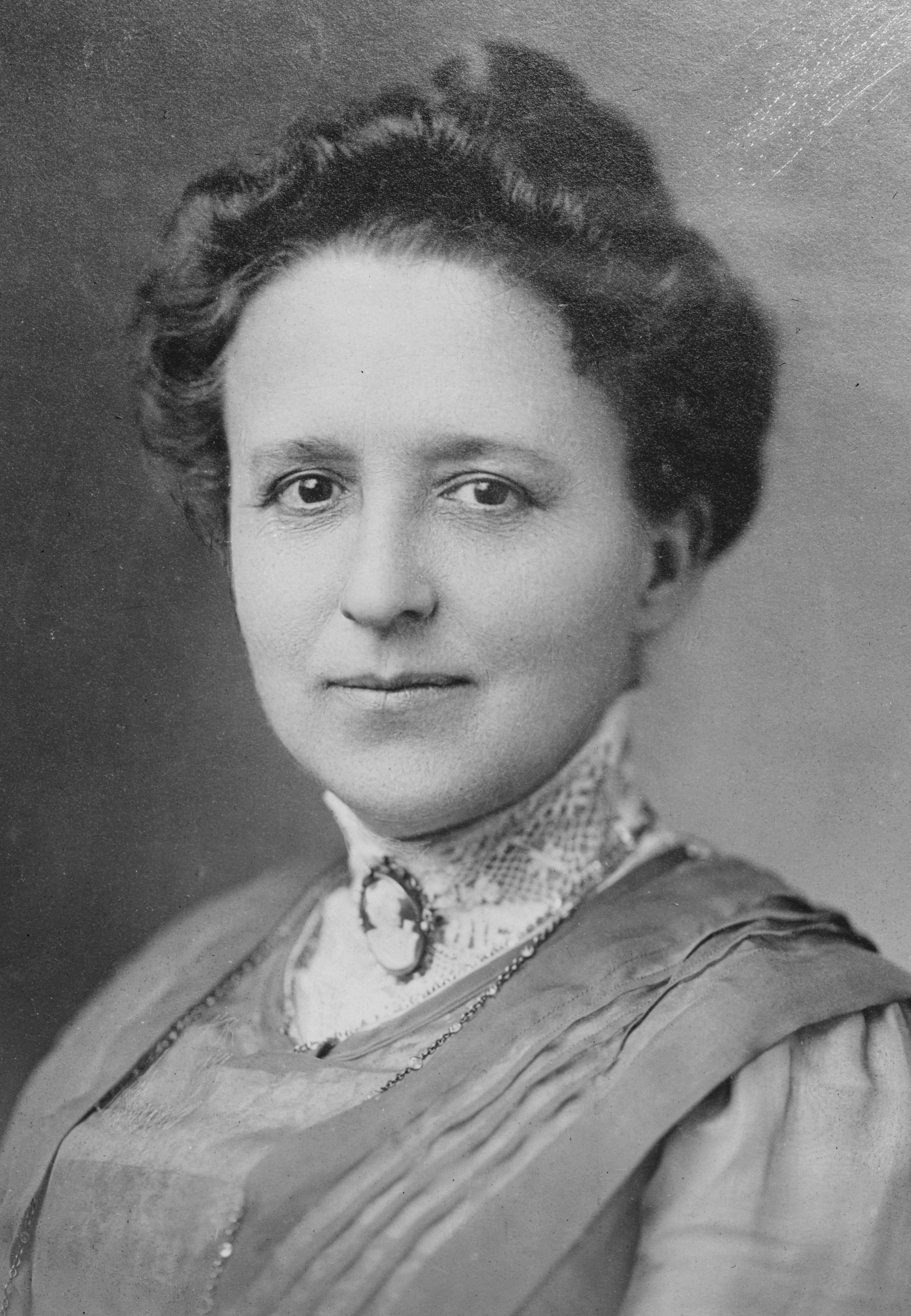
- Bartelme circa 1913

Cook County Public Guardian
- In office 1897–1913
- Appointed by: Gov. John R. Tanner

Cook County Circuit Court assistant judge
- In office 1913–1923

Cook County Circuit Court associate justice
- In office 1923–1927

Cook County Circuit Court -- Juvenile Court presiding judge
- In office 1927–1933

Personal details
- Born: July 24, 1866 Chicago, Illinois, U.S.
- Died: July 25, 1954 (aged 88) Carmel, California, U.S.
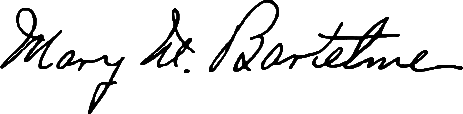
- Signature

Mary Margaret Bartelme (July 24, 1866 – July 25, 1954) was an American judge and lawyer, who was a pioneer in the area of juvenile justice. She was first appointed Cook County Public Guardian in 1897, where she worked to find suitable homes for orphaned children and managed minor children's estates. Bartleme was appointed a Cook County assistant judge in 1913 and began hearing court cases involving juveniles. She was referred to during that time as "America's only woman judge", by The New York Times. She was subsequently elected in 1923 – the first woman elected judge in Illinois.

Bartelme was also a well-known advocate and opened three settlement homes throughout her life known as "Mary B. Clubs" which provided housing to juvenile girls. Contributions to the clubs were also used to provide each girl with a suitcase containing underwear, toiletries, and a new dress, an act that earned Bartelme the nickname "Suitcase Mary".

== Early years ==
Mary Bartelme was born in Chicago, Illinois, as the daughter of immigrants from Saarland, Germany, Balthasar and Jeannette Bartelme. She had three sisters and two brothers, and described her childhood as a time of pulling candy, tying quilts, singing French songs at night, and having fun as a young girl. She graduated from West Division Grammar and High School in 1882 and subsequently began to teach in the Chicago Public School system for the next five years. During this time, she became interested in studying chemistry and medicine and wanted to pursue schooling as a doctor. She spoke with a woman physician about her interests who advised her to speak with a woman lawyer before deciding on her career. Bartelme spoke with lawyer Myra Bradwell and decided to pursue law after a singular visit. She entered Northwestern Law School in 1892 at age 25 and received her law degree in 1894. She was also admitted to the Illinois Bar in 1894 and began a general law practice, specializing in probate law. In 1896, Bartelme joined the American Bar Association.

== Career ==
Known as a social reformer, during the Progressive Era, Mary Bartelme devoted much of her life to the reform of juvenile laws and the welfare of children.

=== Public Guardian of Cook County ===
In 1897, Mary Bartelme was appointed to be the Public Guardian of Cook County by Governor John Riley Tanner. She was the first woman in this post and held the position for the next sixteen years. In her role, Bartelme would find homes for orphaned children and helped to manage minor children's estates. Through her work, she became known across Illinois as a tireless advocate for children and her compassion for the young girls earned her the nickname "Mother Bartelme."

=== Assistant Judge ===
Because of her criticism of the handling of young boys and girls accused of crimes in the courtroom, Judge Merritt Pinckney recommended that a woman hear such cases and, in 1913, named Bartelme as an Assistant Judge in the Juvenile Court of Cook County. Bartelme also convened a special Girl's Court which heard cases of delinquent and dependent girls ages ten through seventeen, many of them prostitutes. All personnel in this closed court were female, which was felt to encourage a more open discussion of sexual and other private matters. Throughout her time as an Assistant Judge, Bartelme would interview the delinquent girls and their parents in private to determine the best course for the girl. She would then make her recommendation to the judge who would determine the final verdict. Bartelme served in this capacity for ten years.

=== Judge ===
On November 6, 1923, Mary Bartelme was elected Judge after being nominated by the Republican party to finish the unexpired term of a Cook County Circuit Court Judge. She ran against Democrat D.J. Normoyle and won by a margin of over 14,000 votes. This was the first time Illinois elected a woman to a court of such high jurisdiction. In 1927, Bartelme was re-elected to a full six-year term as a Judge.

== Activism ==
Mary Bartelme was a Republican, member of the Woman's City Club, an advocate of women's suffrage and member of the Woman's Party, Chicago Suffrage Club, and League of Woman Voters, as well as president of the Business Women's Club. In the 1916-1917, she served as vice chair of the National Woman's Party. Bartelme's position as one of the earliest women judges paved the way for other women, particularly in the Northeast, where local governments and voters were less welcoming of women to the judiciary. In 1914, the chairwoman of the Brooklyn Committee on Women Judges in Children's Court cited Bartelme's successful service in Illinois to petition for a pending bill that would allow women judges to serve in New York.

=== Mary B. Clubs ===
In 1914, Bartelme established three settlement homes, known as "Mary B. Clubs", for girls who were not able to return to their parents. These clubs were supported by volunteer services and used as an alternative to state institutions. The first two clubs, which started in 1914 and 1916, accepted white girls; the last one, started in 1921, accepted girls of color. Girls would stay at these homes between six months and several years with more than two thousand girls passing through the group homes in a space of ten years.

Contributions to these homes were also used to provide each girl who left with a suitcase containing underwear, toiletries, and a new dress. This act earned Bartelme the nickname "Suitcase Mary" by numerous reporters and news outlets.

== Later years ==
After a distinguished career, Mary Bartelme retired in June 1933. After retiring, Bartelme moved to the west coast. She resided in Carmel, California, where she lived with her niece, Adelaine Bartelme. She would occasionally return to Chicago for visiting.

In California, she continued to do speaking engagements, discussing the need to improve the juvenile justice system. In 1936, she received Primary Class Instruction in Christian Science from Bicknell Young CSD, having been a practicing Christian Scientist for many years. She died after a short illness on July 25, 1954, at the age of 88. One of her final requests was that upon her death, in lieu of flowers, donations would be made to the Mary B. Clubs, which were still in operation.

Mary Bartelme would later be described as the single most important person in the first 25 years of the Cook County Juvenile Court, the first juvenile court established in the U.S.

== Legacy ==
In September 1957, a new Chicago elementary school that was named for her opened on N Ridge Blvd in Rogers Park, Chicago. The school was able to accommodate more than 400 students, however, was eventually torn down sometime in the 1970s to make way for a senior citizen apartment home.

Mary Bartelme Park, in the West Loop area of Chicago, is also named in her honor.

== See also ==
- Mary Conway Kohler
- List of first women lawyers and judges in Illinois
- List of first women lawyers and judges in the United States
