= Church of the Epiphany (Chicago) =

Historic church in Illinois, United States

- U.S. National Register of Historic Places
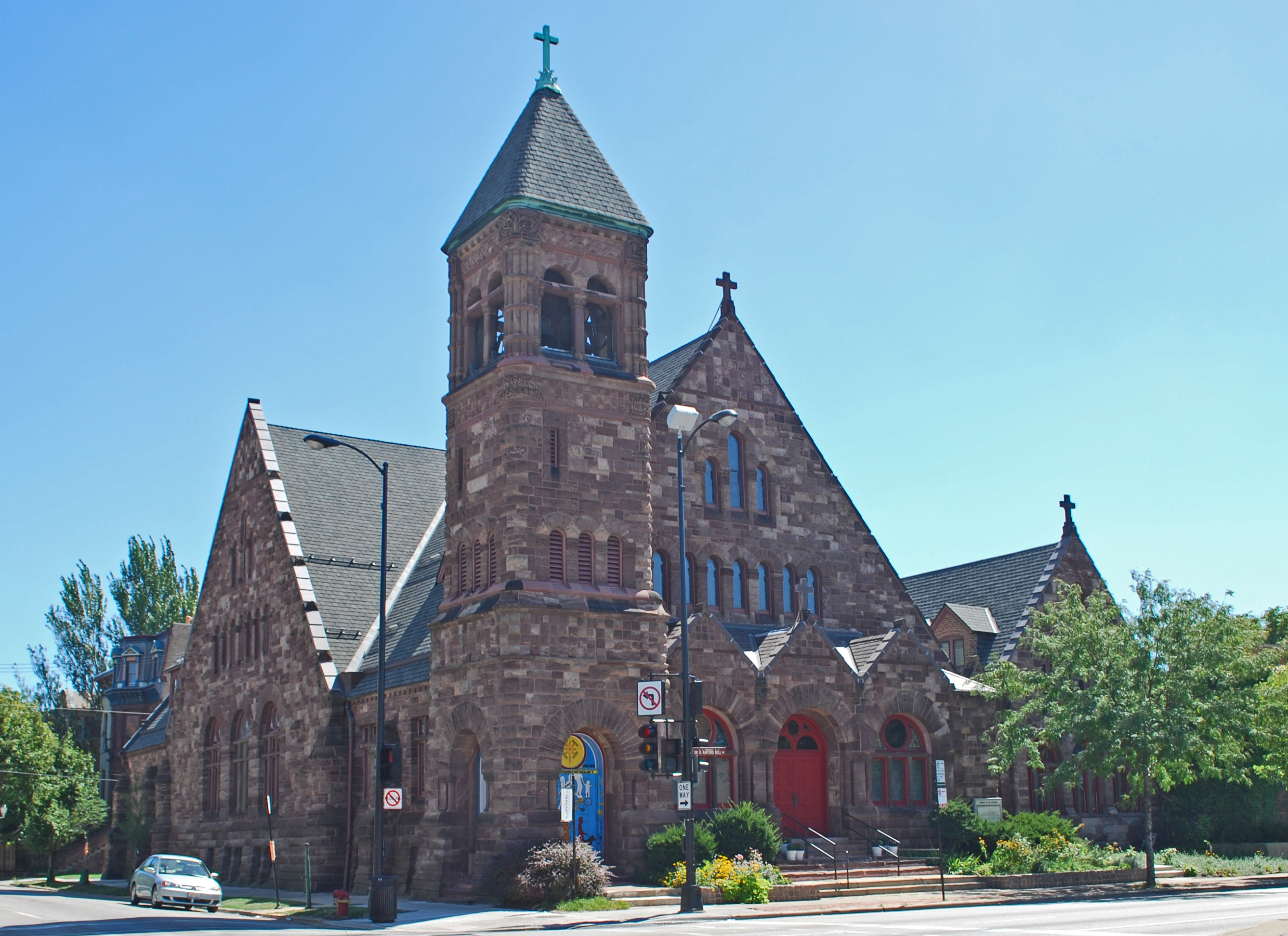

- Location within Chicago metropolitan area Location within Illinois Location within the United States
- Location: 201 S. Ashland Ave., Chicago, Illinois
- Coordinates: 41°52′43″N 87°39′59″W
- Area: less than one acre
- Built: 1885; 141 years ago
- Architect: Francis M. Whitehouse
- Architectural style: Romanesque
- NRHP reference No.: 98000067
- Added to NRHP: February 5, 1998

The Church of the Epiphany is a historic Episcopal church located at 201 S. Ashland Avenue in Chicago, Illinois. The church was built in 1885 to replace its congregation's original church, which had grown too small for its increasing membership. Architect Francis Meredyth Whitehouse (1848-1938) of the Chicago firm Burling and Whitehouse designed the church in the Richardsonian Romanesque style. The church has a sandstone exterior made up of irregularly coursed and roughly faced blocks; the stone was imported from Lake Superior. The building's entrances and windows are framed by heavy arches which are supported by short columns with floral decorations. A bell tower, completed in 1887, rises above the front corner of the church; the tower features patterned sections of smooth and rough stone and arched openings at the top.

In 1962, the church formed an outreach ministry, St. Gregory Episcopal School. The K-8 school's focus was to enhance the educational opportunities for the young men in the surrounding resource challenged neighborhood using the traditional boy choir educational model as a form of liturgical and educational learning.

The church was added to the National Register of Historic Places on February 5, 1998.
