= Cook County Public Guardian =

The Office of the Cook County Public Guardian is a governmental office in the U.S. state of Illinois set up to act as the legal guardian when needed of disabled adults, as well as to act as attorneys and guardian ad litem for abused and neglected children in Cook County. The Public Guardian's Office employs around 400 personnel, including approximately 150 lawyers, and has an annual operating budget of approximately $21.9 million. Presently, Charles P. Golbert serves as the Cook County Public Guardian.

== Divisions ==
The Public Guardian's Office has a number of divisions. The largest division, the Juvenile Division, represents some 10,000 children in abuse and neglect proceedings in Juvenile Court. The Adult Guardianship Division serves as guardian for approximately 900 adults with disabilities. The Adult Guardianship Division also manages about $100 million in estate assets and recovers stolen assets for clients.

The Domestic Relations Division represents children in the most contentious custody battles in divorce cases. The Appellate Division brings appeals designed to expand the rights of children and the disabled. The Impact Litigation Division engages in institutional reform class action cases and prosecutes money damages lawsuits and civil rights actions on behalf of children harmed by the foster care system.

== See also ==
- Mary Bartelme
- Nellie Carlin
- Mary Belle Spencer
