= James S. Harlan =

American lawyer (1861–1927)

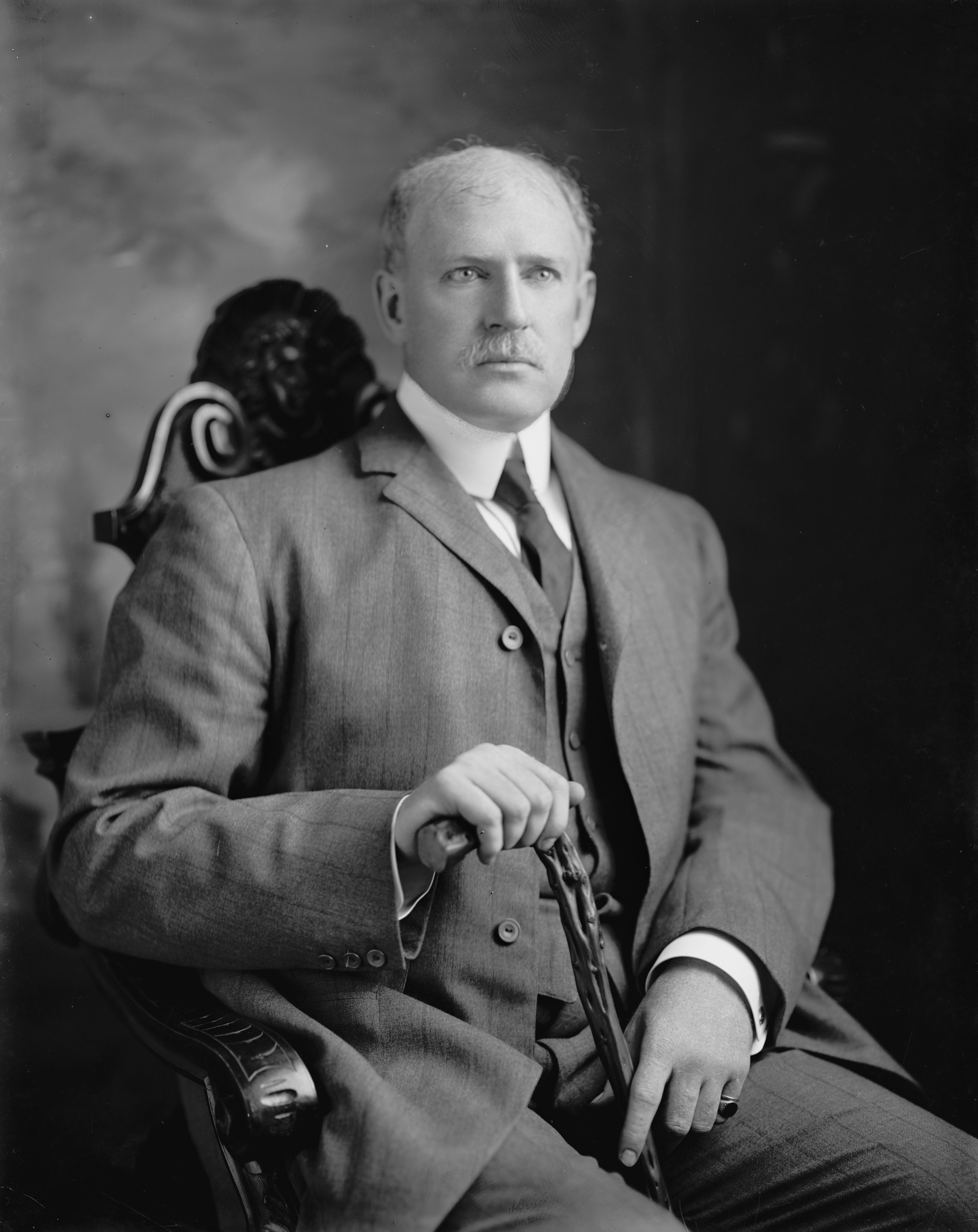
- Harlan, c. 1925

Attorney General of Puerto Rico
- In office 1901-1903

Personal details
- Born: November 24, 1861 Evansville, Indiana, U.S.
- Died: September 20, 1927 (aged 65)
- Spouse: Mary Maud Noble (m. 1897)
- Relations: John Marshall Harlan II (nephew); John Maynard Harlan (brother); James Harlan (grandfather)
- Parent: John Marshall Harlan (father)
- Education: Princeton University
- Occupation: Lawyer

James S. Harlan (November 24, 1861 – September 20, 1927) was an American lawyer and commerce specialist, son of U.S. Supreme Court Justice John Marshall Harlan and uncle of Justice John Marshall Harlan II.

== Biography ==
Harlan was born at Evansville, Indiana, graduated from Princeton University in 1883, and studied law in the office of Melville W. Fuller in 1884 to 1888. Admitted to the bar in 1886, he practiced law in Chicago as a member of the firms of Gregory, Booth, and Harlan, and Harlan and Harlan. From October 1888 to 1889, he served as the first law clerk to Chief Justice Fuller.

In 1894, alongside Clarence Darrow and Stephen S. Gregory, Harlan represented Patrick Eugene Prendergast (the assassin of Chicago Mayor Carter Harrison Sr.) in petitioning for a jury to determine his sanity in order to challenge his conviction to the death sentence. They succeeded in getting a jury to hear argument that Prendergast was currently insane, therefore (per state law) ineligible for execution. However, Prendergast was deemed sane and was executed.

In 1901, President Theodore Roosevelt nominated Harlan as Attorney General of Puerto Rico and he served until 1903. He became a member in 1906, and chairman in 1914, of the United States Interstate Commerce Commission.

== Personal life ==
In 1897, he married Mary Maud Noble in Washington, D.C.

== See also ==
- List of law clerks for the chief justice of the United States
- Clarence M. York
- Everett Riley York
- Thomas A. Russell
- Thomas H. Fitnam
- Frederick Emmons Chapin
