= Thomas H. Fitnam =

American lawyer

Thomas Howard Fitnam (August 19, 1854 – April 5, 1919) was an American attorney who was one of the first law clerks to the justices of the Supreme Court of the United States, serving Chief Justice Melville Fuller from 1888 to 1889.

In 1854, Fitnam was born in Washington, D.C., to Rosella Dant and Thomas Fitnam, a harness maker. As a young man, Fitnam Jr. worked as a plasterer and printer. In June 1884, at age 30 Fitnam graduated from Georgetown University with a LL.B., where he won a prize for his essay. He continued his post-graduate studies at Georgetown, receiving his LL.M. in 1885. In 1885, he worked as a pressman for the United States Government Printing Office. After clerking for the Supreme Court, Fitnam engaged in private practice and was an examiner and trustee in the Equity Court in Washington, D.C.

Fitnam died in Washington, D.C., on April 5, 1919.

== See also ==
- List of law clerks for the chief justice of the United States
- Clarence M. York
- Everett Riley York
- James S. Harlan
- Thomas A. Russell
- Frederick Emmons Chapin
