= Everett Riley York =

American politician

Member of the Washington House of Representatives from the 34th district
- In office 1901–1903

Member of the Washington House of Representatives from the 36th district
- In office 1903–1905

Personal details
- Born: June 25, 1860
- Died: December 14, 1940 (aged 80) Tacoma, Washington

Everett Riley York (June 25, 1860 – December 14, 1940) was an American lawyer who was one of the first law clerks to the justices of the Supreme Court of the United States, serving associate justice Stanly Matthews from 1886 to 1888.

== Biography ==
York was educated in the public schools and at Cazenovia Seminary in New York. Then, he was an assistant reporter in the Senate at Harrisburg, Pennsylvania. Later he was stenographer in the courts in Schuylkill County, Pennsylvania. In 1880, he was secretary of the land commissioner of the Boston & Maine Rail Road at Lincoln, Nebraska. After moving to Washington, D.C., from 1883 to 1885, he was a private secretary to the assistant United States Postmaster General. In June 1884, York graduated with a LL.B. from National University School of Law in Washington, D.C. In June 1885, he was awarded a LL.M. The year following he began serving as law clerk to Justice Matthews.

In June 1889, York moved to Tacoma, Washington, and engaged in private practice with the Northern Pacific Railway and the firm of Mitchell, Ashton & Chapman. He also worked for the Tacoma Land and Import Company, and the Narrows Land Company. In 1901, he was nominated by the Republican Party and elected to the Washington State House of Representatives from the 34th district, and in 1903 from the 36th district.

=== Death ===
York died on December 14, 1940, in Tacoma.

== Personal life ==
On June 15, 1887, York married Currence Bostwick Fitch in Washington, D.C. They had four children: a son, Arthur York; and three daughters, Florence York (Fawcett), Helen Denison York (McLaughlin) and Anne Moffat York (King).

== See also ==
- List of law clerks for the sixth seat of the Supreme Court of the United States
- Clarence M. York
- Thomas A. Russell
- James S. Harlan
- Thomas H. Fitnam
- Frederick Emmons Chapin
