= Frederick Emmons Chapin =

American attorney (1860–1923)

Frederick Emmons Chapin (December 7, 1860 – March 20, 1923) was an American attorney who, in the 1890s, was one of the first law clerks to the justices of the Supreme Court of the United States.

== Biography ==
Chapin was born at Crittenden, New York, on December 7, 1860, the son of Katherine (née Hart) and William Slocum Chapin. He is related to John Hart, a signer of the Declaration of Independence. He was educated in the public schools at Livingston County, New York. He studied law at Columbian University, now called George Washington University, graduating in 1888.

On December 20, 1886, Chapin married Mary Rebecca Louisa Libbey, in Washington, D.C., and they had a son, Frederick Joseph Chapin, and a daughter, Marcia Katherine Chapin. He is a member of the Episcopal church.

For periods from 1885 to 1891, he served successively as private secretary to U.S. Senator Joseph Roswell Hawley, law clerk to Justice Howell Edmunds Jackson, and law clerk to Justice Henry Billings Brown of the Supreme Court of the United States. In 1891 and 1892, he was a part-time reporter for the New York Tribune and New Haven Palladium. In 1891 to 1892, he was clerk to the United States Senate Committee on Post Office and Post Roads. Chapin was private secretary to Justice Jackson at the time of Jackson's death in August 1895. He then entered private practice in Washington, D.C..

In 1903, he worked as legal adviser to the Embassy of Japan.

Chapin died in Washington, D.C., on March 19, 1923.

== See also ==
- List of law clerks for the third seat of the Supreme Court of the United States
- Clarence M. York
- Everett Riley York
- James S. Harlan
- Thomas A. Russell
- Thomas H. Fitnam
