= Frederick Chapin =

Frederick or Frederic Chapin may refer to:

- Frederick H. Chapin (1852–1900), American mountaineer and archaeologist
- Frederic Chapin (1873–1947), American composer and screenwriter
- Frederic L. Chapin (1929–1989), American diplomat
- Frederick Emmons Chapin (1860–1923), American attorney and Supreme Court law clerk
