= Assassination of Carter Harrison III =

1893 murder in Chicago, U.S.

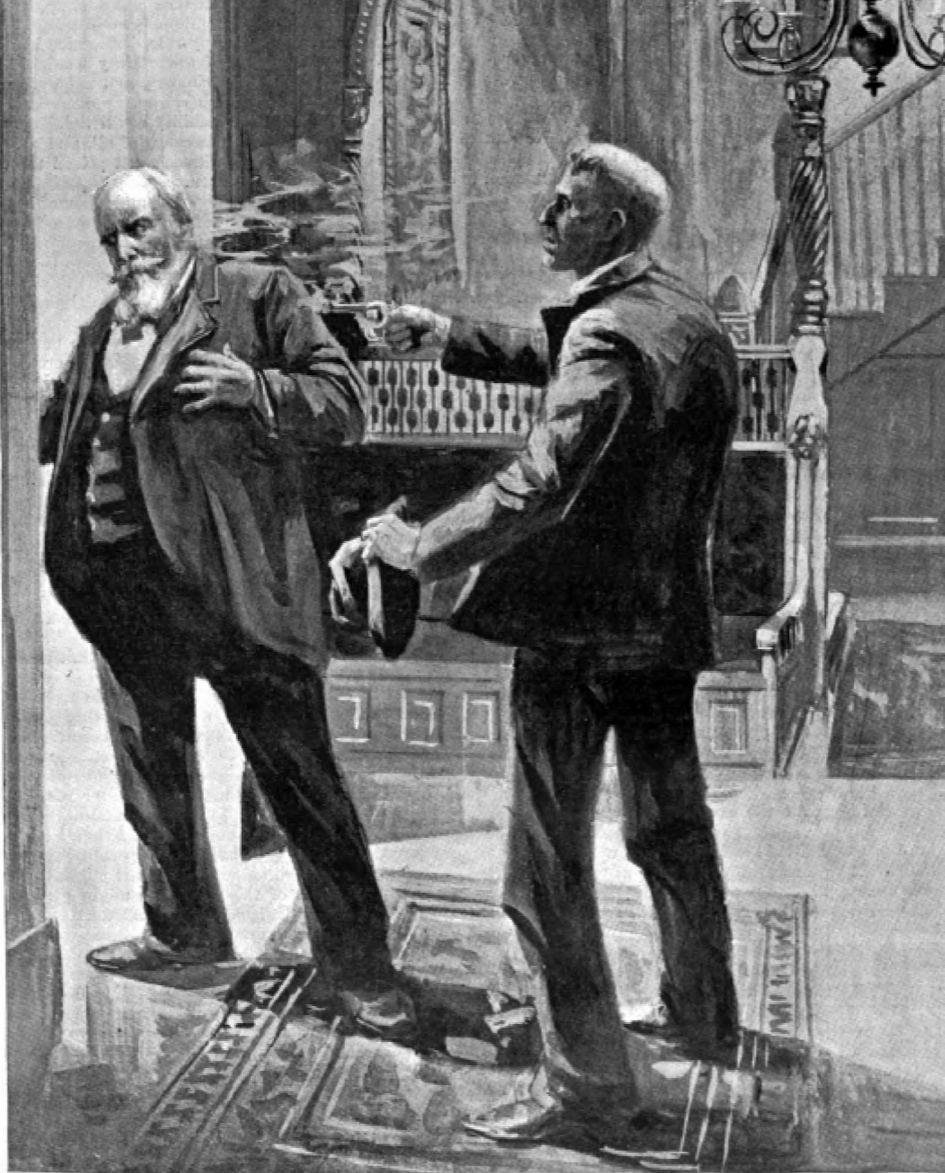
- Illustration of Harrison being shot by Prendergast
- Location: Residence of Carter Harrison III, Chicago, Illinois, U.S.
- Date: October 28, 1893; 133 years ago
- Target: Carter Harrison III (mayor of Chicago)
- Attack type: Assassination
- Weapon: .38 revolver manufactured by Smith & Wesson
- Deaths: 1 (Harrison)
- Motive: Likely mental illness; retribution over his perception that Harrison had failed to reward him for campaign support
- Verdict: Guilty
- Convictions: Murder in the first-degree
- Sentence: Death
- Convicted: Patrick Eugene Prendergast

On October 28, 1893, Patrick Eugene Prendergast fatally shot Carter Harrison III (the mayor of Chicago) inside Harrison's residence. Prendergast's assassination of Harrison was driven by a delusion Prendergast held that he was entitled to be appointed the city's corporation counsel (a role he held no qualification for), and that Harrison had wrongfully deprived him of this.

The assassination occurred two days prior to the closing day of the World's Columbian Exposition in Chicago, and led to the cancellation of the world's fair's closing ceremony. It quickly drew comparisons to the 1881 assassination of U.S. president James A. Garfield by Charles J. Guiteau. Like Prendergast, Guiteau had been a deranged office seeker whose actions were motivated by having not been given a patronage appointment that he perceived he was entitled to. Harrison's death was met with large-scale public mourning in Chicago, with his funeral ranking as one of the most-attended in history. The national reaction was also immense, with the assassination becoming one of the most sensationalized events of its day. For a long time afterwards, Harrison's assassination was considered a well-remembered event in American history. However, it has since fallen into relative obscurity.

In the subsequent murder trial, Prendergast was found guilty of murder in the first-degree, and was sentenced to death. Legal efforts led by attorney Clarence Darrow to forestall his execution (including an attempt to have Prendergast legally found to be currently insane, a condition which under Illinois law would have rendered him ineligible for execution) were ultimately unsuccessful. Prendergast was executed by hanging.

== Background ==
=== Carter Harrison III (victim) ===
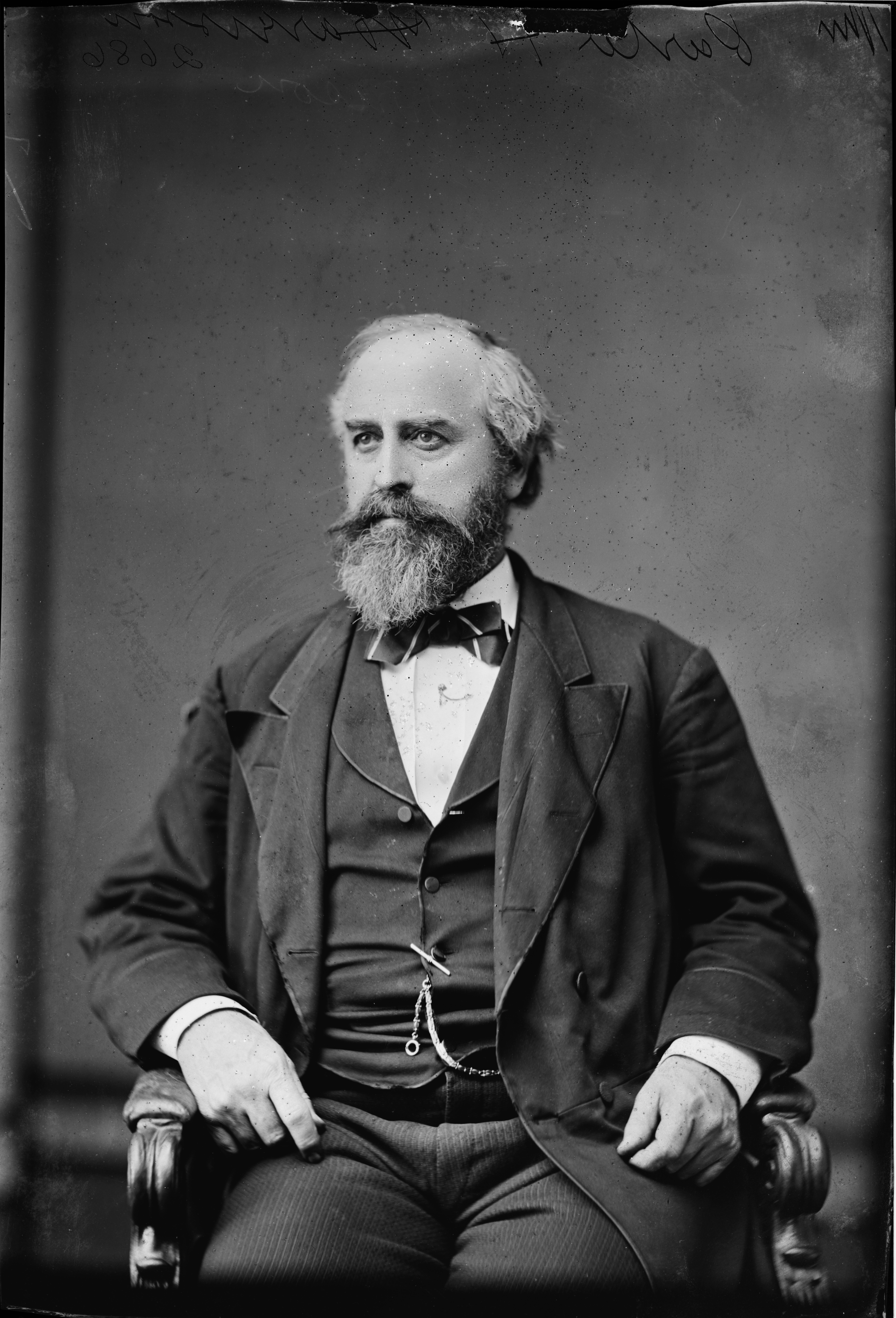
Portrait of Harrison

Carter Harrison III was an American politician who served two tenures as mayor of Chicago: the first between 1879 and 1887 and the second beginning in 1893. Harrison was a Democrat.

Harrison unsuccessfully ran in 1891 to become mayor again. Harrison was returned to office in early 1893, winning election to an unprecedented fifth term as mayor. His fifth term overlapped with the city's hosting of the World's Columbian Exposition, a significant world's fair that was scheduled to hold its closing ceremonies on October 31. Harrison was due soon after to marry his fiancé, Annie Howard, on November 12.

Harrison was a well-liked mayor. Dubbed "the common man's mayor". and "the people's mayor", he made himself accessible to citizens. He took great pleasure in riding around the city's neighborhoods on horseback, stopping to speak with residents. He also made it known that his door was "always open", allowing citizens to drop-in for audiences with him at his residence. He had ordered his staff never to turn away any visitor to his residence. His policy of giving drop-in audiences to residents would lead to him finding himself fatally at the receiving end of gunshots fired by the aggrieved Patrick Eugene Prendergast.

=== Patrick Eugene Prendergast (perpetrator) ===
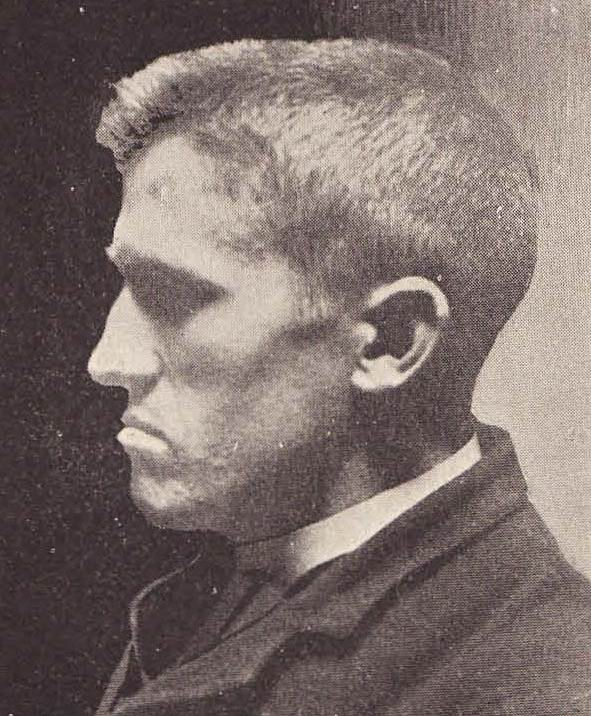
Photograph of Prendergast

The assassination was carried out by Patrick Eugene Prendergast, a newspaper distributor. Prendergast was reported to have suffered a severe head injury from a fall at the age of four, from which he was unconscious for a long period of time and suffered vomiting for four weeks after. He was described as a peculiar child, solitary, irritable and excitable, with a poor memory who did poorly in school. Prendergast left home at 16 because of imaginary persecution and by 18 had developed grandiose ideas of his capabilities and became a fanatic for the single-tax promoted by Henry George.

Prendergast became a newspaper distributor in Chicago, where he lobbied for improvements in Chicago's railroad grade crossings, which he saw as a danger to the public. He supported Carter Harrison's 1890s election campaigns under the delusion that if Harrison won the election, Prendergast himself would receive an appointment as the city's corporation counsel. Prendergast had a fixation with writing postcards. In order to support Carter Harrison's pursuit to regain the mayoralty, Prendergast sent rambling postcards to prominent Chicagoans urging them to vote for Harrison. Among those who received such a postcard was prominent lawyer A. S. Trude, who would later prosecute the case against Prendergast in the murder trial that followed the assassination. Prendergast sent these postcards in support of Harrison for more than two years before Harrison was successful in winning the 1893 Chicago mayoral election. Prendergast believed that his letters had been responsible for Harrison's success in the election.

Prendergast visited Chicago City Hall under the delusion that he had been appointed corporation counsel by Harrison. After Prendergast was insistent to a clerk that he held the position, he was brought to meet Adolph Kraus, the incumbent corporation counsel, who showed Prendergast his office and teased him by facetiously asking if he wanted the job. While Prendergast did not have the education or qualifications that required for the office, he was nevertheless angered that he had not been appointed by Harrison to it. After Harrison had spent six months in office without appointing him corporation council or granting him any recognition, Prendergast began to desire revenge against Harrison for the perceived slight.

Prendergast wrote threatening letters to both Harrison and Kraus, a fact which was quickly discovered by investigators following the assassination. One letter to Kraus read, "I want your job. Do not be a fool. Resign. Third and final notice."

== Earlier activities of Prendergast on the day of the assassination ==
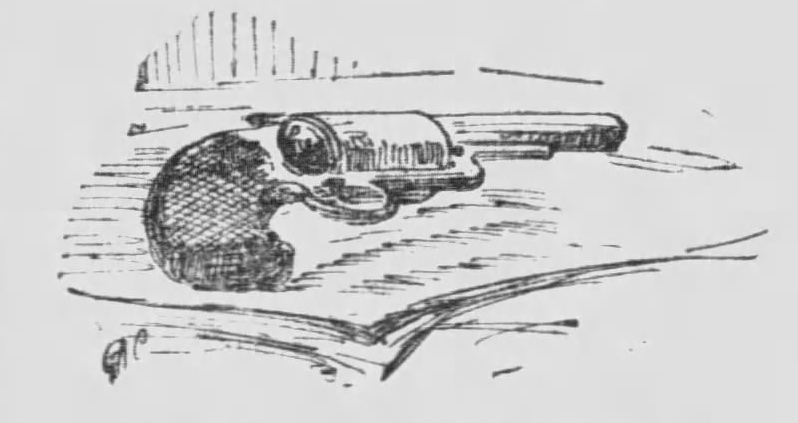
Illustration of the revolver that Prendergast used

On October 28, 1893 (the day of the assassination), Prendergast purchased a six-chamber .38 revolver manufactured by Smith & Wesson. He would use this weapon to carry out the assassination. Because this model often misfired, he opted to keep the chamber under the hammer empty.

Per press reports, on the day of the assassination (prior to traveling to Harrison's residence and assassinating Harrison), Prendergast had visited Kraus at his office at City Hall and issued a threat if Kraus did not resign from his office. The news reports stated that Kraus tricked Prendergast into thinking he was about to resign, before escaping by ditching Prendergast in the building's crowded lobby.

== Earlier activities of Harrison on the day of the assassination ==
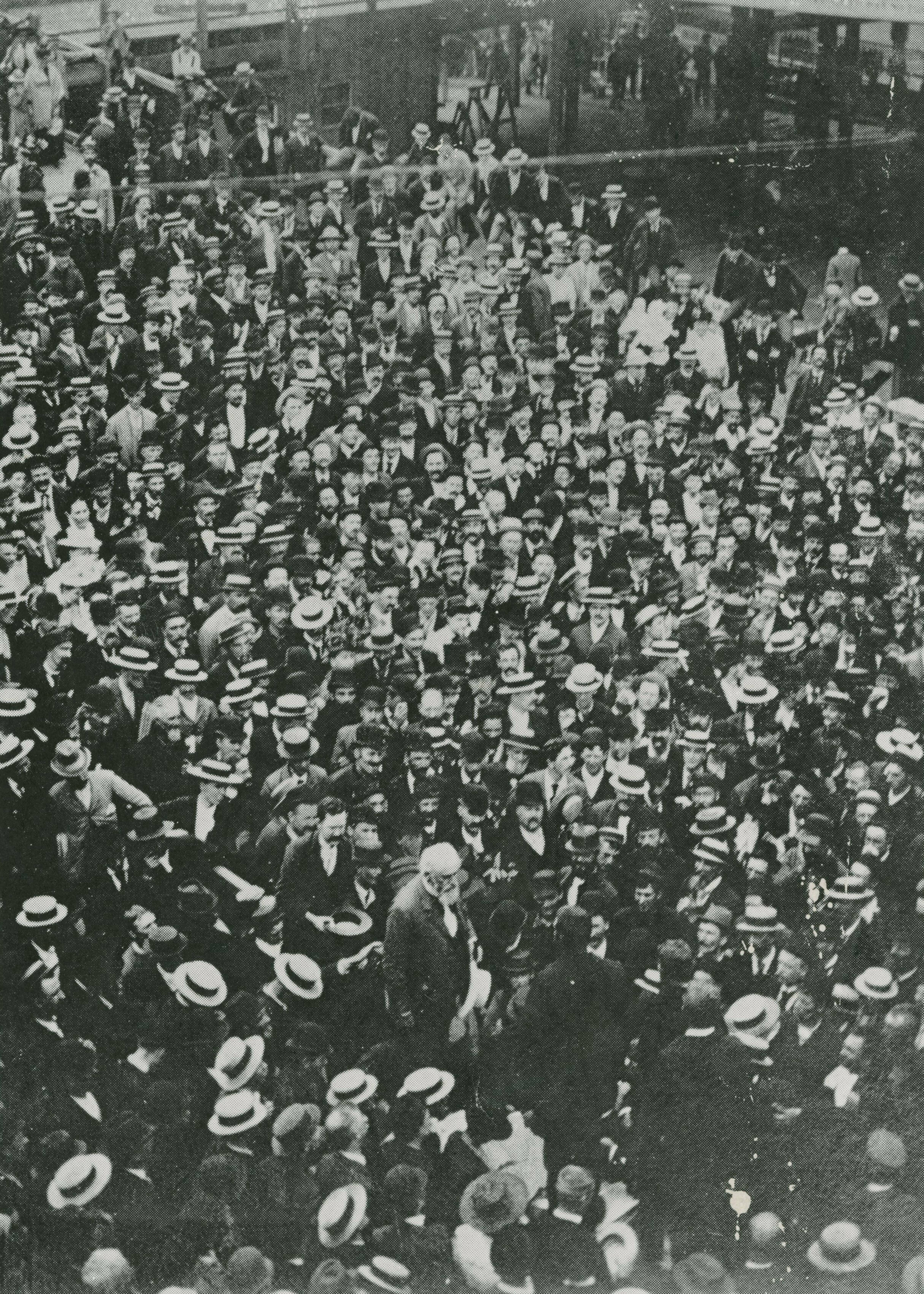
Photograph of Harrison addressing a crowd in his final speech

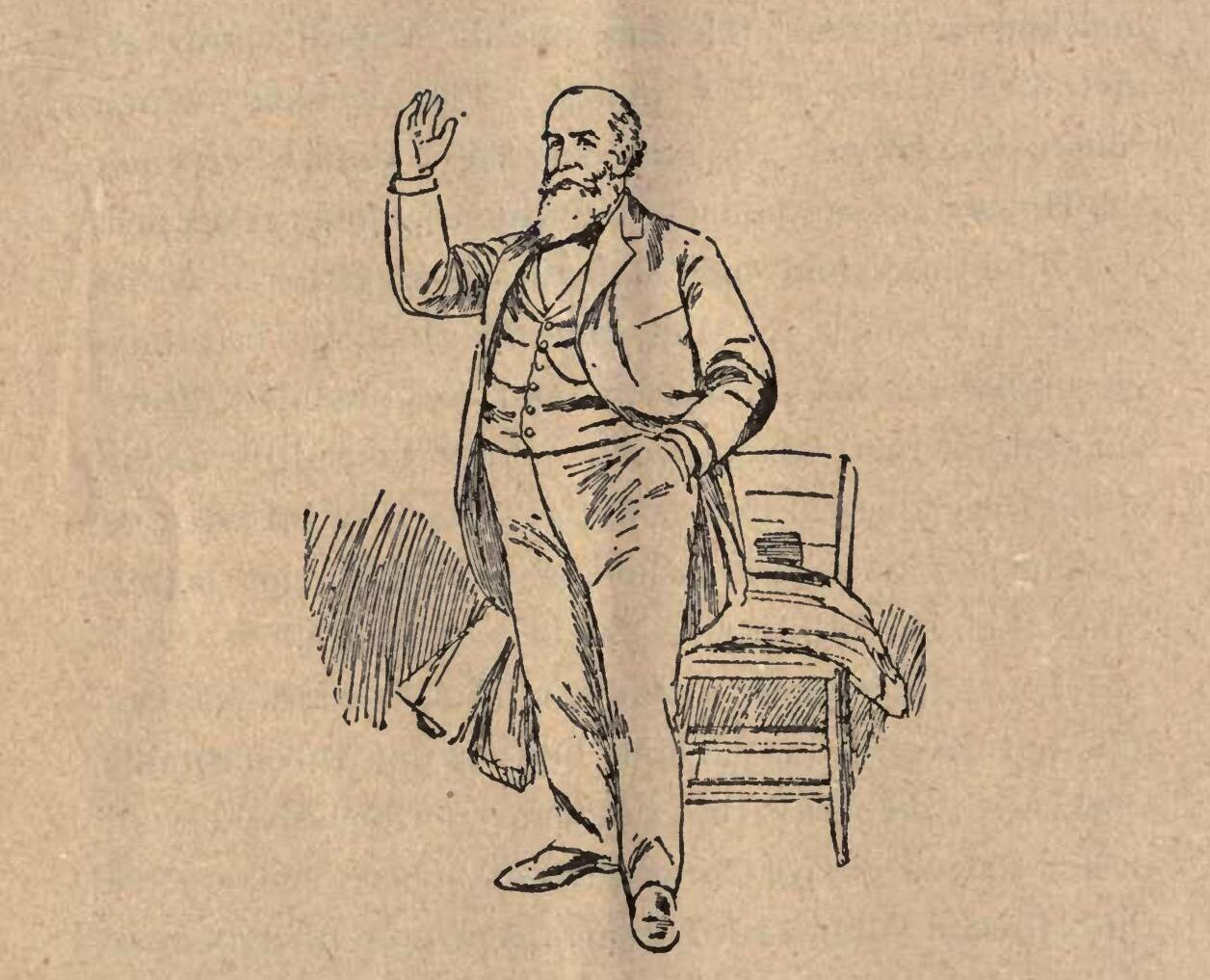
Illustration of Harrison delivering his final speech

On the day of the assassination, Harrison delivered a speech shortly before noon at the Music Hall on the grounds of the World's Columbian Exposition as part of its "American Cities Day" celebration. American Cities Day saw Harrison host 5,000 mayors and city councilmen of U.S. cities at the fairgrounds. It is believed to have been the largest-ever gathering of United States mayors.

In his remarks, Harrison remarked on Chicago's ascendence in the ranks of world cities, promising that by the end of the next half-century, "London will be trembling lest Chicago shall surpass her," and that predicting that Chicago would grow to become, "the biggest city in America and the third city on the face of the globe". He expressed his wish of living to see the day that Chicago might reach such heights.

Harrison delivered second, impromptu, remarks around noon. Aldermen Martin B. Madden and William R. Kerr (both member's of the convention's committee on arrangements) had originally been scheduled to ring the Columbian Liberty Bell at noon. When Alderman Madden failed to show at noon, Harrison suggested that he would join Alderman Kerr in ringing the bell. Harrison and a party which also featured Mayors Edwin Sydney Stuart (of Philadelphia), George Pickering Bemis (of Omaha), and John Fitzpatrick (of New Orleans) ventured over to the bell, where Harrison stood before the bell with his hands holding its cord and delivered brief unprepared remarks before proceeding to ring the bell. This was the final speech that Harrison would ever deliver.

Afterwards, Harrison toured exhibits at the exposition and mingled with the crowds. He first visited the Tiffany's exhibit, where he signed an autograph album for the exhibit's manager. He next toured the Britannia and Meriden exhibits, and was presented at each exhibit with gifts of souvenir spoons. He next had lunch, after which he visited the Italian exhibit. During the afternoon, he expressed hope that the U.S. Congress may perhaps authorize an extension of the fair for an additional year, remarking that he wished he would have more opportunities to visit the fair than the twenty times he already had over the course of its run. At 3:40 PM local time, Harrison remarked that he was feeling tired and departed the fairgrounds for his residence. He remarked that, having spent most of the day at the fair, he felt "dead tired".

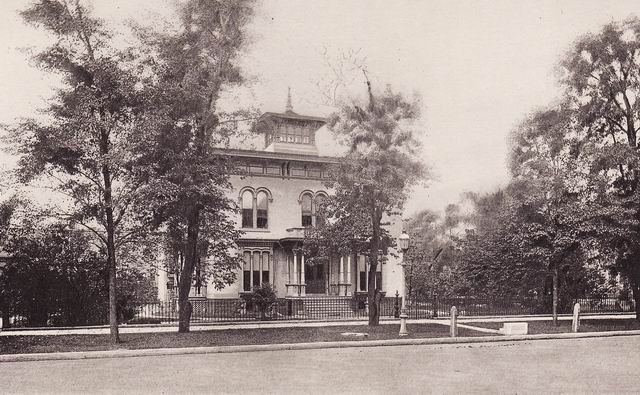
Photograph of Harrison's residence, where the assassination took place

Harrison retired to his residence for the evening, arriving at approximately 5pm local time. Soon afterwards his son William Preston Harrison returned to the house as well, and joined his father for dinner and in order to discuss a potential article to be published in the Chicago Times newspaper that the family operated. They were joined at dinner by Mayor Harrison's youngest daughter, Sophie. Towards the end of the dinner, the mayor fell asleep in his chair.

== Assassination ==
Prendergast rang the doorbell of Harrison's home. Harrison's maid, Mary Hanson, answered the door, and requested that Prendergast return in a half-hour. When Prendergast returned, she asked him to wait in the hall. Hanson went to retrieve the mayor. Hanson had thought Prendergast looked familiar and mistook him for a city official. When Harrison asked who was here to see him, she told him it was a city official. Hanson then herself went to join other household staff for dinner in the kitchen, while Harrison went to greet his visitor. Harrison went through a doorway that connected the dining room directly to the front hall of the residence.

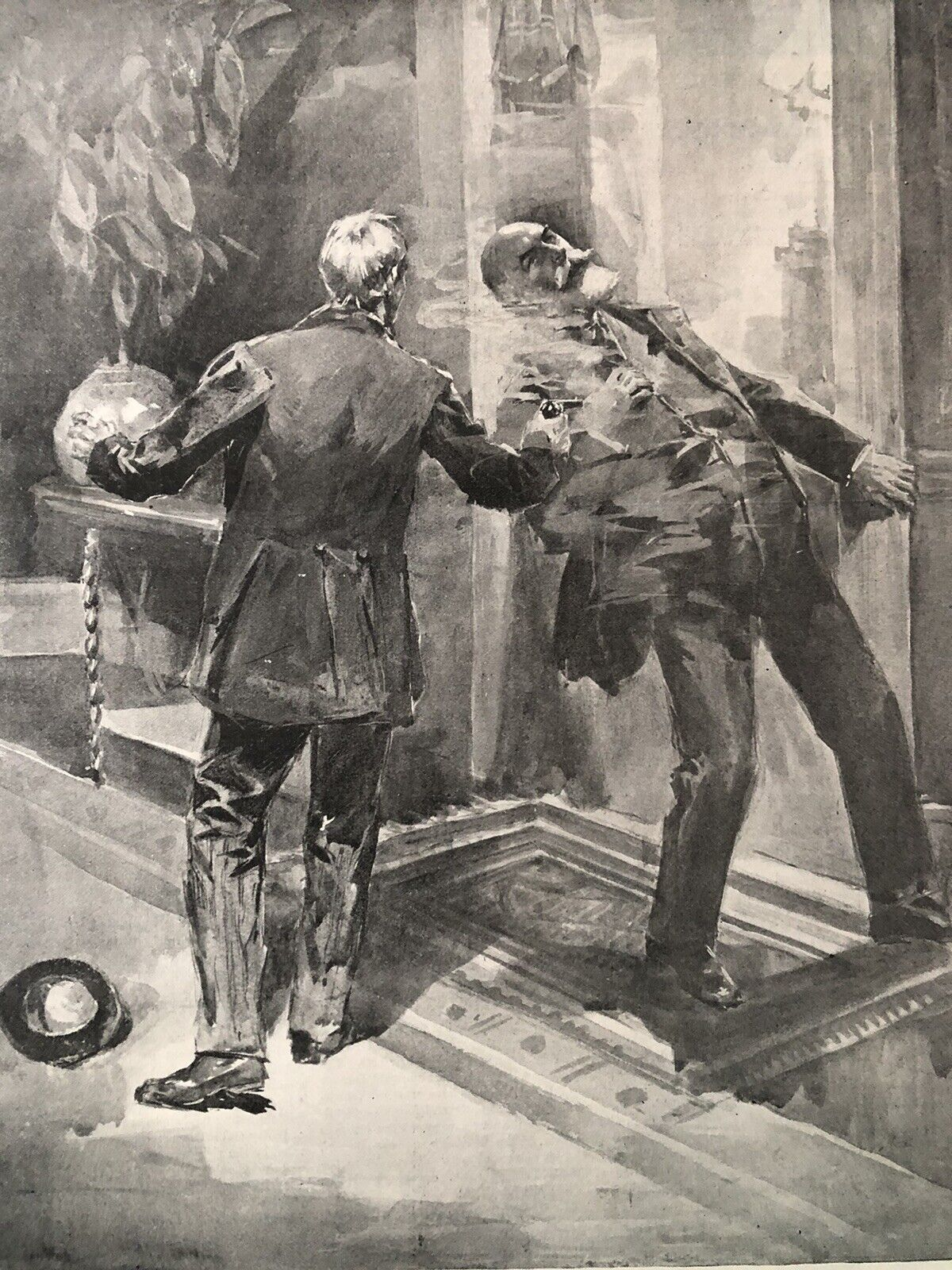
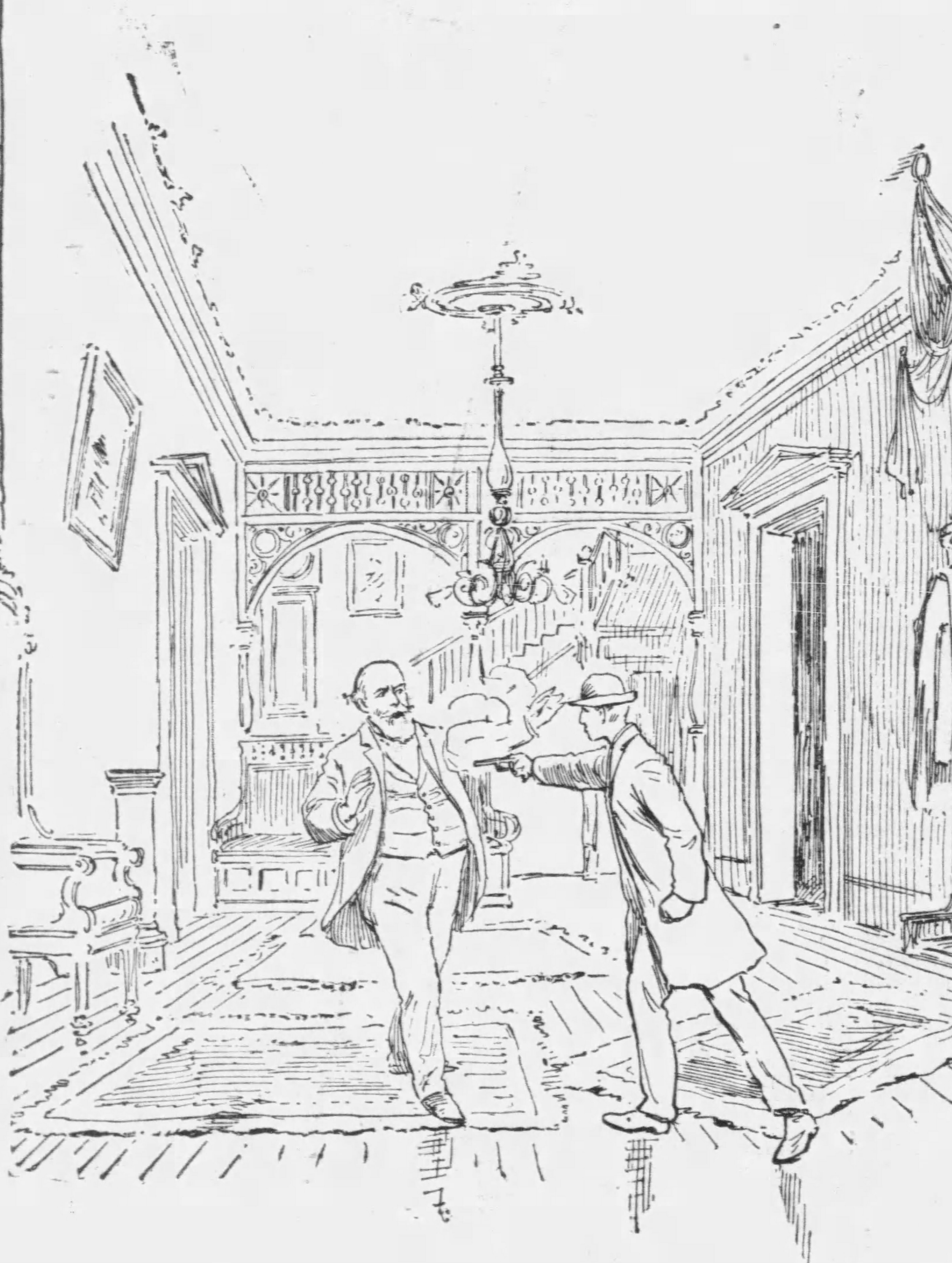
Illustrations of the assassination

Soon after Harrison walked into the doorway, Prendergast fired four gunshots into him. The first gunshot entered Harrison's left hand, exiting through his palm. The next went through his abdomen roughly five inches above his navel, and stopped in his intestine. The third made a roughly three-inch wound under his right nipple. The final shot appears to have been fired while Harrison was on the ground suffering the pain from the first three shots. It traveled four inches below the skin below the rear of his right shoulder.

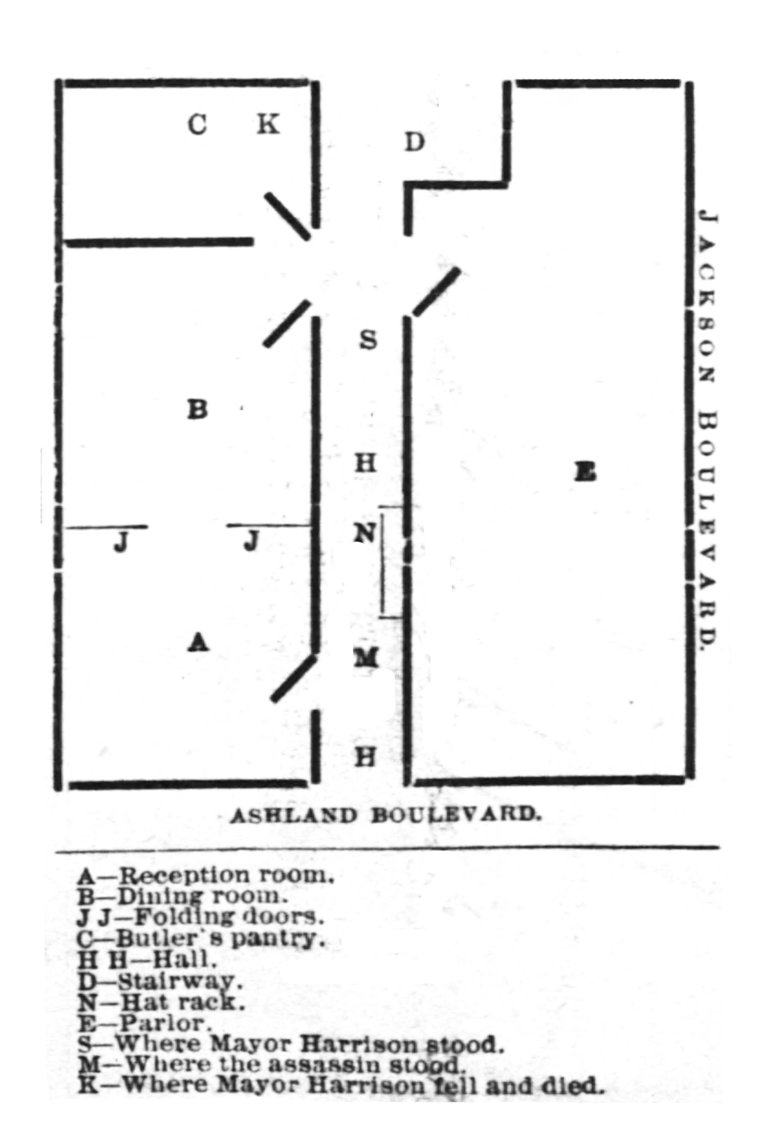
Layout of the Harrison residence, scene of the Assassination

After shooting the mayor, Prendergast ran out of the residence through its front door. Harrison's coachman, Paul Elliason Risberg, having heard the gunshots from the level of the House below, had quickly run up the stairs to the entrance level with a handgun. Noticing Risberg emerging into the front hall, the fleeing Prendergast shot into the front hall. Risberg returned fire. Neither were wounded in this exchange.

The noise of the commotion attracted the Harrisons' neighbor William Chalmers (the president of the Allis-Chalmers steel company) to quickly run into the residence. Household servants also ran to Mayor Harrison's side. Harrison had pulled himself through the dining room and into a butler's pantry that led to the kitchen before collapsing. William Preston Harrison, who was upstairs, signaled for help by activating an emergency signal in the upstairs, then ran outside to ask a passing bicyclist to get the family doctor. When he came to his father's side William Preston Harrison asked, "father's not hurt, is he?" to which the mayor responded, "Yes. I am shot. I will die." Mayor Harrison was bleeding from his mouth and remained conscious for roughly twelve minutes. Chamlers and William Preston Harrison carried the wounded mayor to a sofa. Chalmers placed his folded coat underneath Harrison's head. He argued that Harrison was wrong in his belief that he had been shot in his heart. Harrison responded, "I tell you I am, this is death." Chalmers would later remark, "he died angry because I didn't believe him. Even in death, he is emphatic and imperious." As doctors and police arrived, Harrison remarked, "doctors are no good now," as he was nearing death. His last words were reported to be, "Give me water. Where is Annie," referring to his fiancé Annie Howard, who had been visiting the nearby home of Harrison's son Carter Harrison IV at the time of the assassination. Howard arrived around the time that the mayor succumbed to internal hemorrhaging. His death came approximately twenty or twenty-three minutes after he was shot.

== Prendergast's surrender to police ==
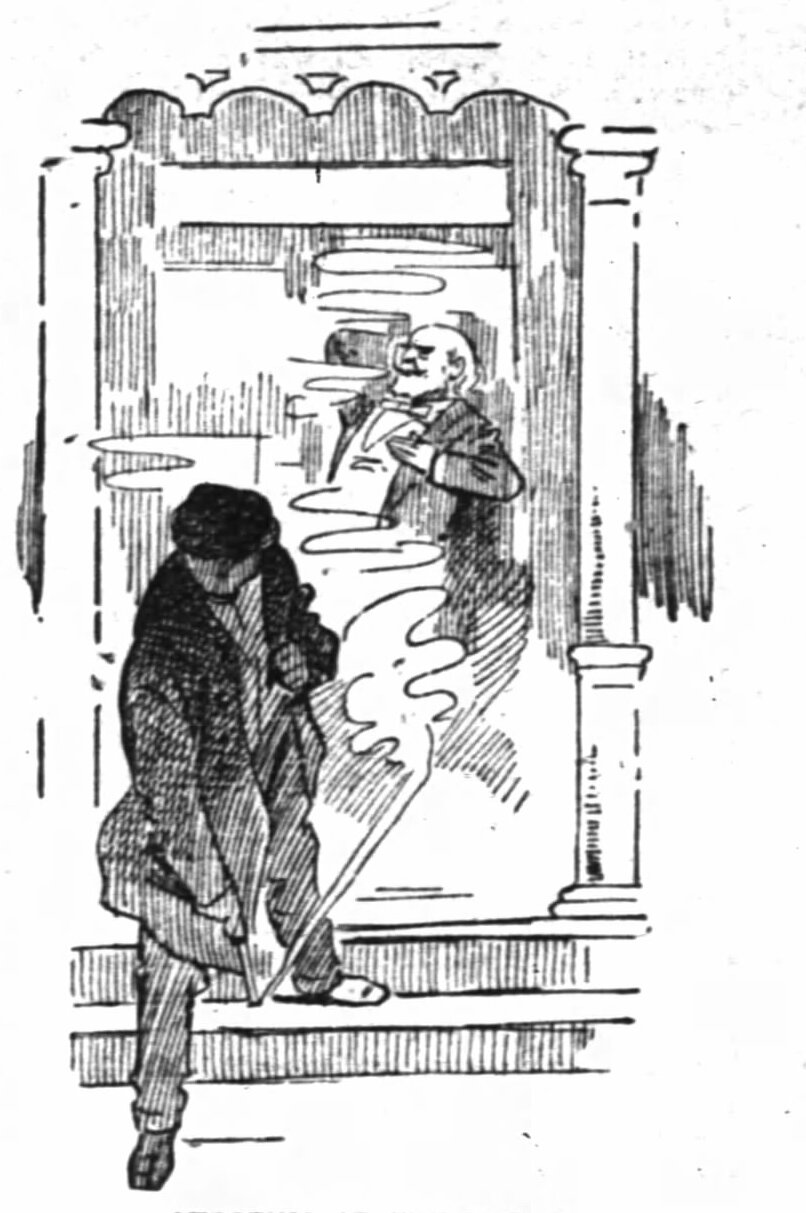
Illustration of Prendergast fleeing the Harrison residence after shooting the mayor

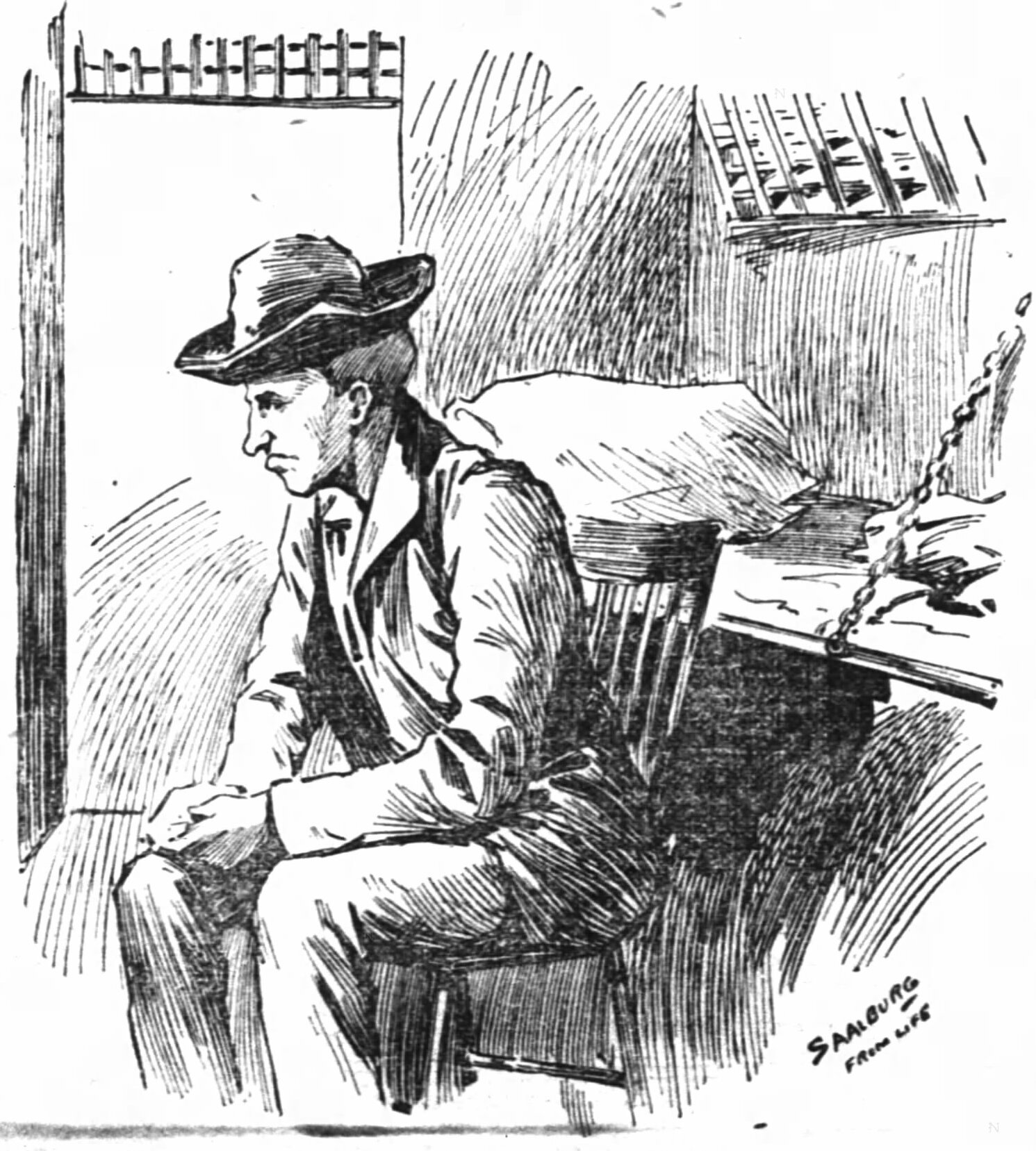
Illustration of Prendergast in his prison cell at the Cook County Jail after his arrest

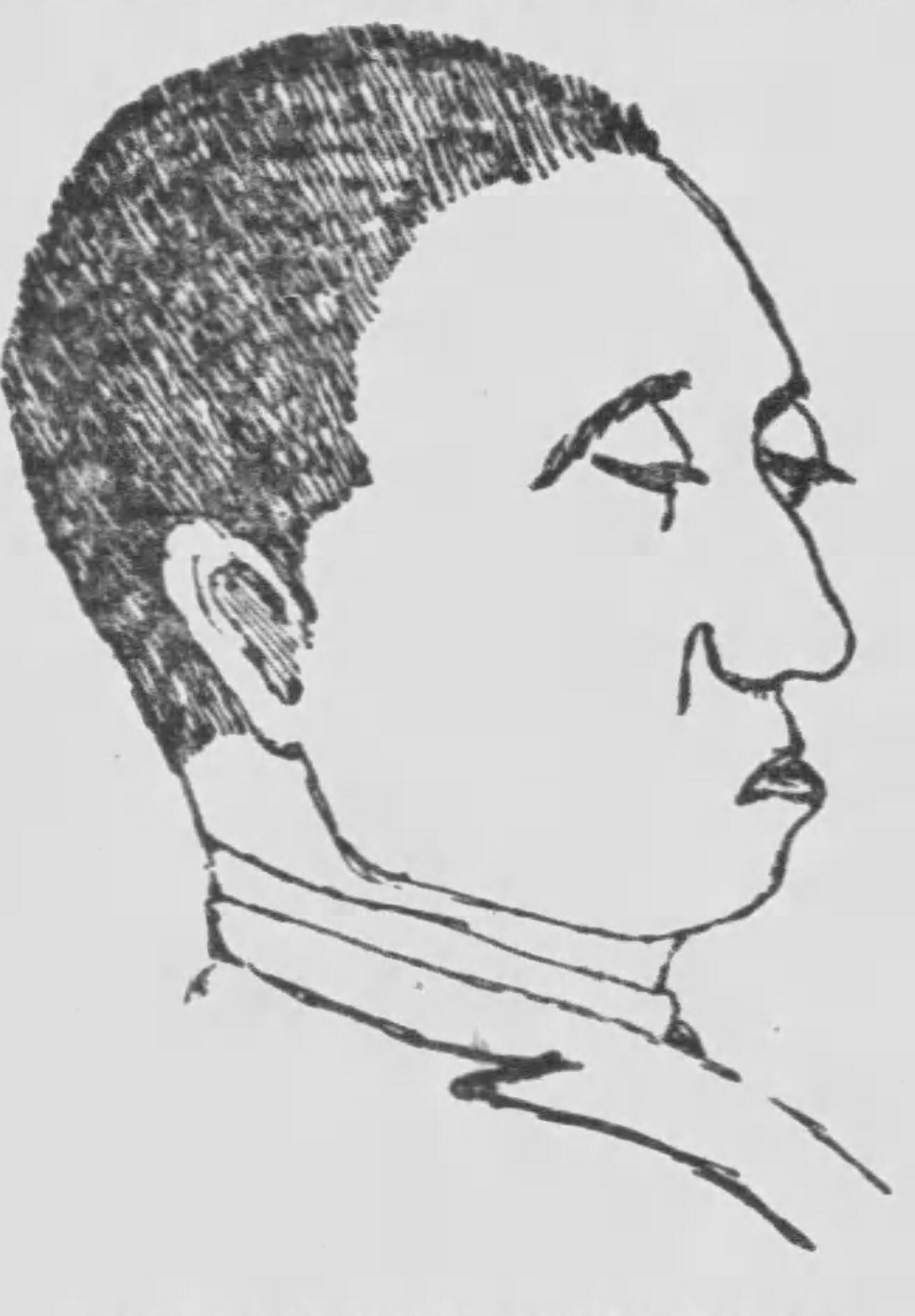
Illustration adapted from a pencil sketch of Prendergast in his cell on the night of his surrender. Prendergast closed his eyes and distorted his face when the sketch was being drawn.

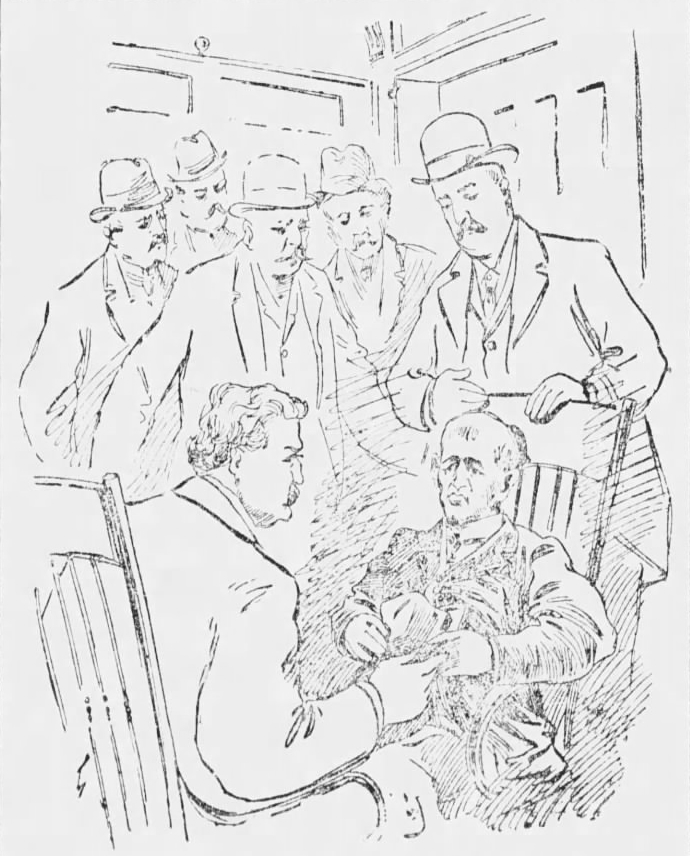
Illustration of Prendergast at the central police station

After fleeing the Harrison residence, the assassin ran further to escape pursuers. He ran for several blocks before catching a ride on a streetcar. He then entered the Des Plaines Street police station, where he surrendered himself approximately thirty or forty-five minutes after shooting Harrison. In surrendering himself, he told the desk sergeant, "lock me up. I am the man who shot the mayor." He still had the gun in his possession when he surrendered. Those at the police station were aware of the mayor's assassination, having been alerted by telephone. The smell of burned powder and the revolver's empty chambers affirmed to the police department that Prendergast was telling the truth. Prendergast gave his name as being Eugene Patrick Prendergast (inverting his first and middle name).

Prendergast made a statement to the police in which he declared,

My name is Patrick Eugene Joseph Prendergast, and I was born in Ireland in April, 1868, but I came to this country with my mother when I was two years old. I have been a messenger boy for the Western Union Telegraph Company, but recently I have been employed as a distributor for the Inter Ocean and Evening Post.
I worked hard for the election of Mayor Harrison during his campaign and he promised to give me a position, but as he refused to keep his word I killed him.

Prendergast was next taken from the Des Plaines Street police station to the central police station, located downtown, where the building was quickly surrounded by a crowd of 5,000 people. With police fearing potential mob violence (and a possible lynching of Prendergast), at 11:15 PM, Prendergast was stealthily hurried into a wagon and taken to another station located on the North Side of the city, where he was lodged in the county jail pending trial.

A news report described Prendergast as, "dressed in a shabby-genteel manner," with, "[insanity] written both in his features and in the restlessness of his manner." While this report noted that it appeared he was an, "insane or partially demented man," it also reported that he had committed the murder, "in cold-blood and deliberate[ly]," having, "arrived at the Harrison mansion bent on murder".

When interviewed by police, Prendergast gave varying stories as to his motive, including the failed appointment and the mayor's failure to elevate train track crossings. In a formal statement, he declared that Harrison, "deserved to be shot. He did not keep his promise to me." A mere twenty minutes after his arrest, Michael Brennan, the general superintendent (head) of the Chicago Police Department, spoke with him. When speaking to news reporters, Brennan characterized Prendergast was insane, idiomatically calling him, "as crazy as a bed bug " and "mad as a March hare". Other police shared with the press their belief that Prendergast was mentally unwell. Joseph Kipley, the assistant chief of police, remarked that, "Prendergast had talked and acted like a crazy man."

== Autopsy, coroner's inquest, grand jury decision, and arraignment ==
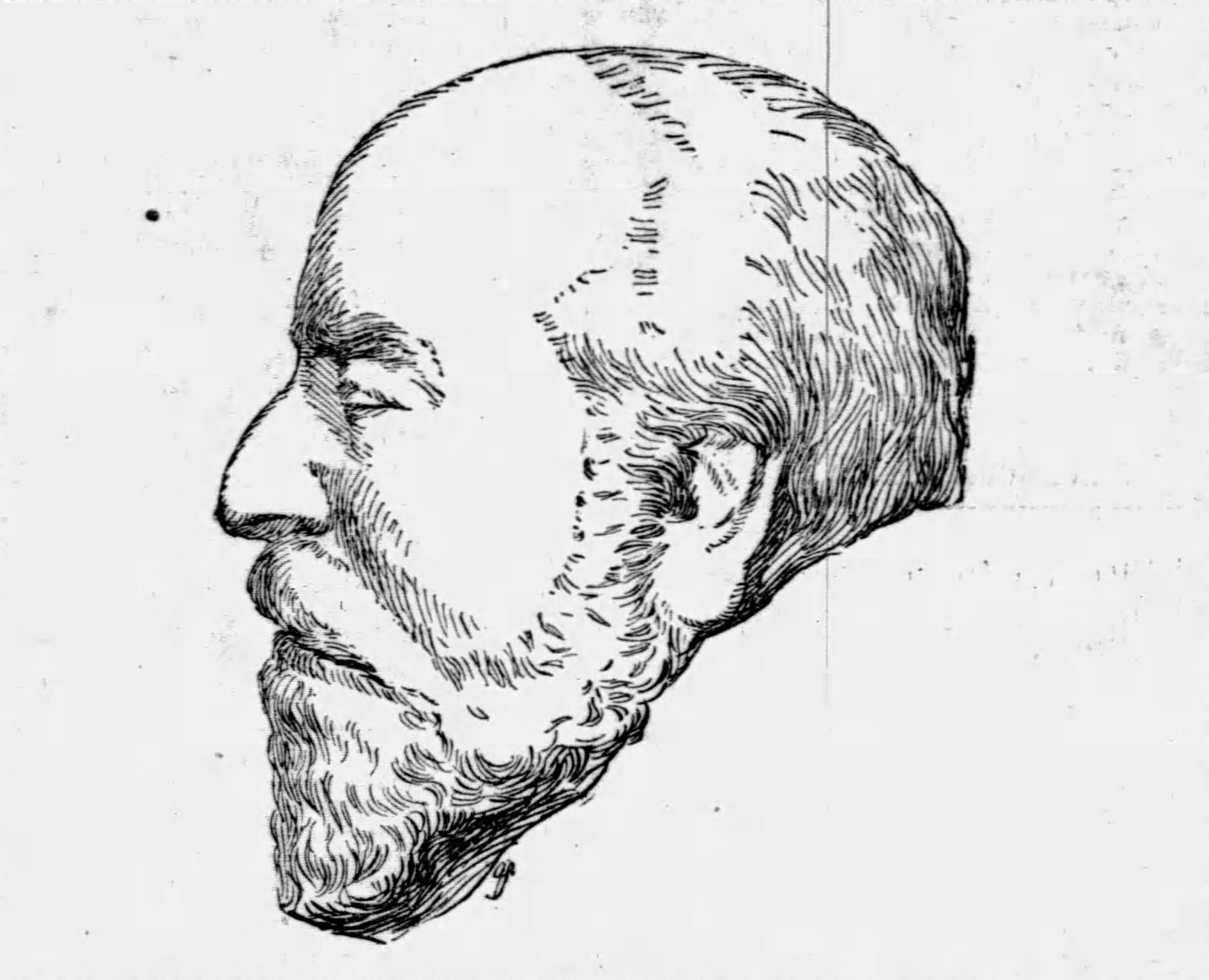
Sketch depicting Harrison's death mask

The autopsy of Harrison was conducted by Dr. Ludvig Hektoen and Dr. Louis G. Mitchell. The morning following the assassination, James McHale (the Cook County coroner) conducted the coroner's inquest at the Harrison residence. During the inquest, Prendergast (accompanied by guards) stood in the foyer where the assassination had occurred while witnesses gave testimony in the south back parlor of the residence. The witnesses included Harrison's son William Preston, maid Mary Hansen, and coachman Barth Reisberg. The only other two witnesses interviewed were police sergeants. Before coroner's jury, witnesses identified Prendergast as the killer and described the events of the previous night.

Prendergast communicated sympathy for Harrison's bereaved family, but refused to speak to the inquest jurors.

The jurors agreed with the testimony of the witnesses as to the manner of Harrison's death, and decided to remand the matter to a grand jury that had been impaneled. Prendergast was then returned to the Cook County Jail, and placed in cell 11 (the same cell where Louis Lingg had famously committed suicide only years earlier).

== Reaction ==
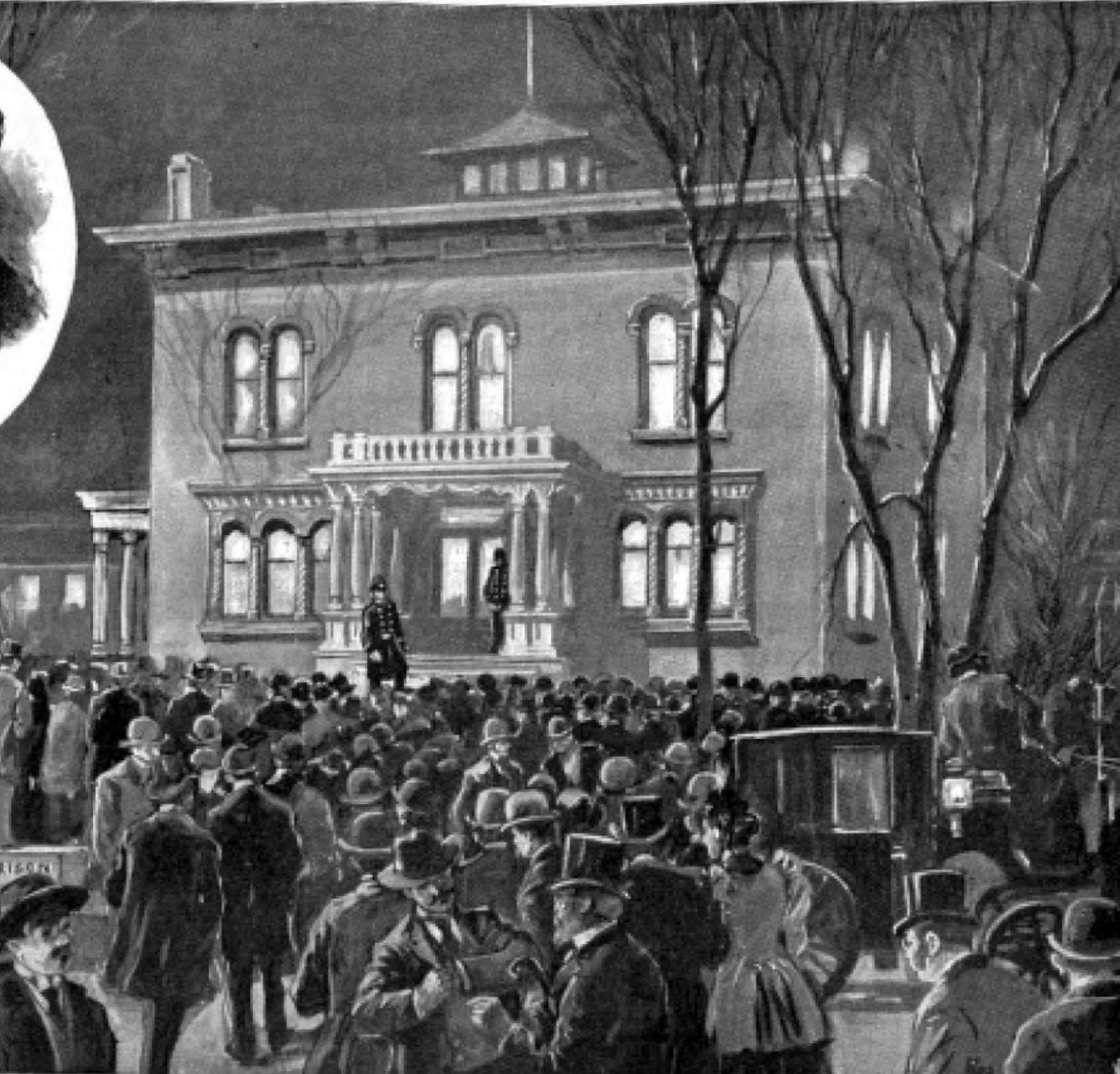
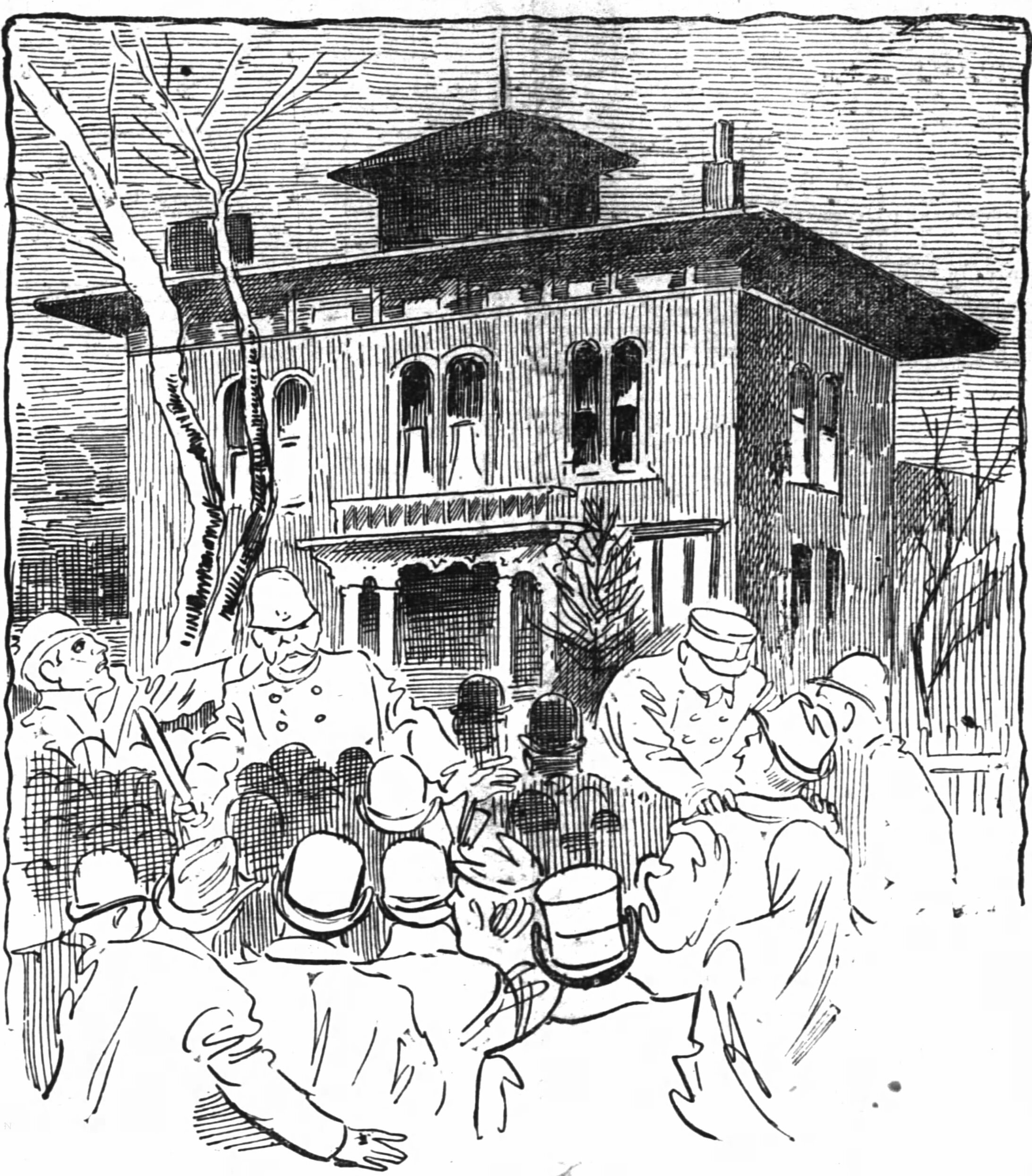
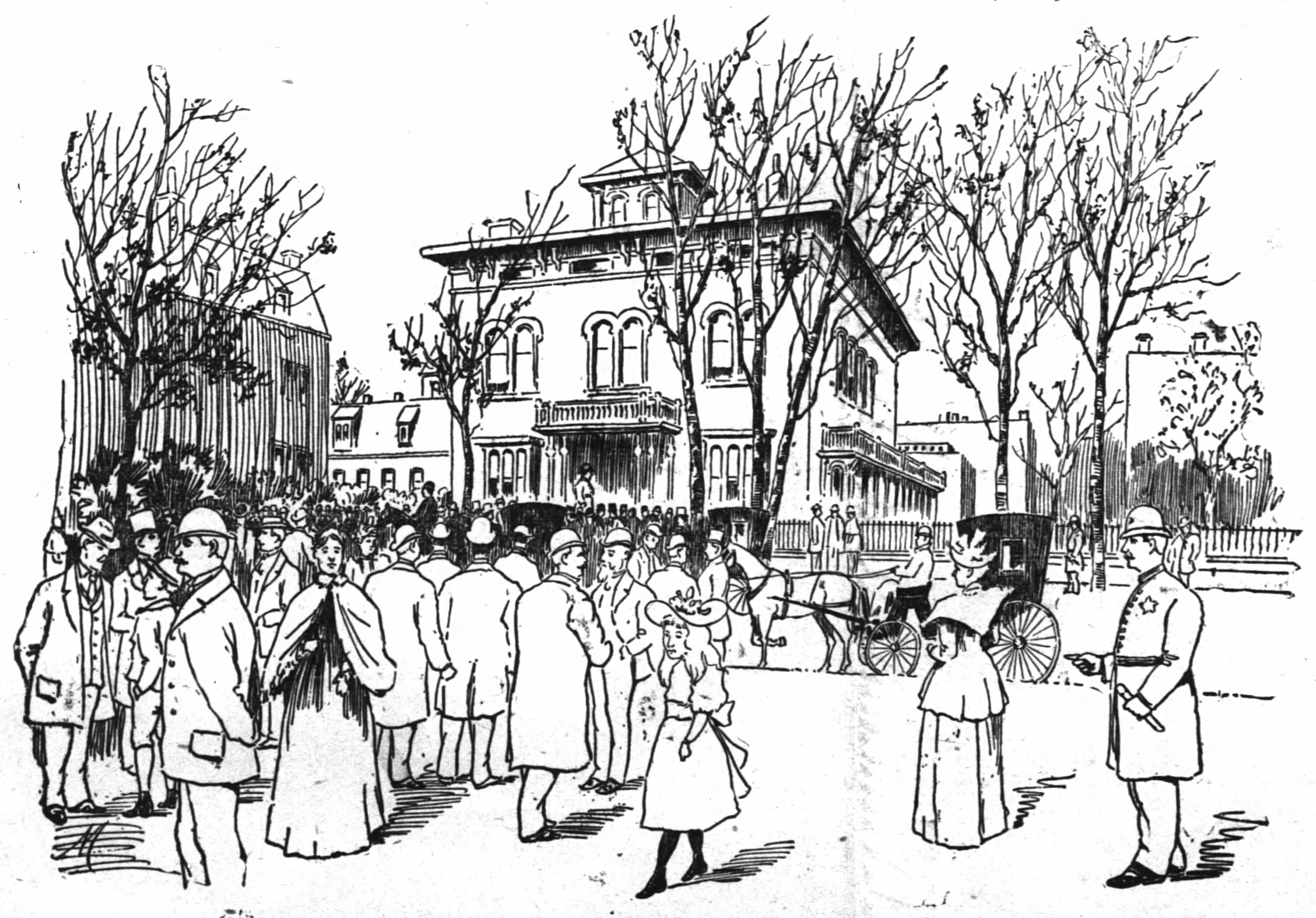
Illustrations of mourners outside of the Harrison residence, with the first two images depicting the night of the assassination, and the third depicting the morning after

Harrison's assassination was met with an immense national reaction, and becoming one of the most sensationalized events in then-recent memory. The Chicago Daily News quickly published a rare evening special edition on the night of the assassination. News of Harrison's death spread fast across the city on the evening of the assassination. That evening, many of Chicago's leading businessmen were attending a banquet hosted by the Commercial Club of Chicago. When news of the mayor's death reached the banquet, expressions of grief were shared and the banquet was immediately adjourned.

Parallels were quickly drawn between the assassination of Harrison by Prendergast and the 1881 assassination of U.S. president James A. Garfield by Charles J. Guiteau. Similarly to Prendergast, Guiteau was a deranged office seeker whose motive was a failure to be given a patronage appointment that he perceived he was entitled to as a reward for his campaign support to Garfield. Prendergast greatly disliked comparisons to Guiteau; he regarded Guiteau as lowly and saw himself as superior to Guiteau.

Harrison's assassination was regarded to possibly be the most sensationalized news item since Garfield's assassination, and generated what a telegraph official remarked was the largest reaction to anything since Garfield's assassination. Several newspapers expressed hope that Harrison and Garfield's assassinations would motivate reforms to civil service that would eliminate the patronage system. The public was particularly alarmed by Harrison's assassination, because it was perceived to be part of a pattern of violent crimes committed against officials, other examples of which included Garfield's assassination years earlier and the more recent assassination of Russian Tsar Alexander II earlier in 1893.

Even before the mayor succumbed to his death, news spread of the shooting and crowds began to form outside of his residence. Massive crowds would continue to populate the outside of the house for the next three days. Harrison was deeply mourned by Chicagoans. In 1937, the editor of the Kansas City Journal recalled the assassination as being, "a crime that shocked Chicago more than any other in its history". Soon after Harrison's death, flags across the city were lowered to half-mast, and buildings (both municipal and private) were covered in black cloth. The City Council met to arrange the funeral, leaving the mayor's chair in the chamber empty during the meeting.

In the days following the assassination, newspapers speculated that Prendergast may have suffered from insanity. Speculation on Prendergast's mental condition became an item of heavy public interest. Despite the initial public perception of Prendergast as a mentally troubled individual, as more became known about his background the public began to view him more as an angered egomaniac that had killed as an act of revenge.

The assassination of Harrison, who had sixteen years earlier served as a member of the United States House of Representatives, elicited wide discussion in the nation's capitol of Washington, D.C. Many publicly expressed great sorrow over his passing, including many of his former federal government colleagues.

An outpouring of messages were delivered by officials, including from President Grover Cleveland, former president Benjamin Harrison, and Illinois Governor John Peter Altgeld. The day after the assassination, the Harrison family received several friends at their residence who came to deliver condolence cards. Among these visitors was U.S. Second Lady Letitia Stevenson. Harrison's fiancé (whose wedding to Harrison was to have been only a matter of weeks after the day of the assassination) had great difficulty coping with his death (which she witnessed the final moments of), suffering hysteria in its aftermath which she received sedation for.

On October 29, it was announced that the closing ceremony of the World's Columbian Exposition, scheduled for the next day, would be canceled. It was replaced with a memorial ceremony for Harrison, which was held in the exposition's Festival Hall. Instead of the planned highly attended grand closing to the fair, the fair's final days were quiet and poorly attended by "weary and uninterested" crowds. The Chicago Daily News reported that the mood during the closing day of the fair was "dull and cheerless" as a result of Harrison's assassination, observing, "there was an air of desolation over all. From every flagstaff drooped a banner at half-mast."

On November 4, the Chicago City Council voted for George Bell Swift to fill the mayoralty on an acting basis pending a special election. During the meeting, the speaker's stand in the council chamber was draped with black cloth.

== Funeral ==
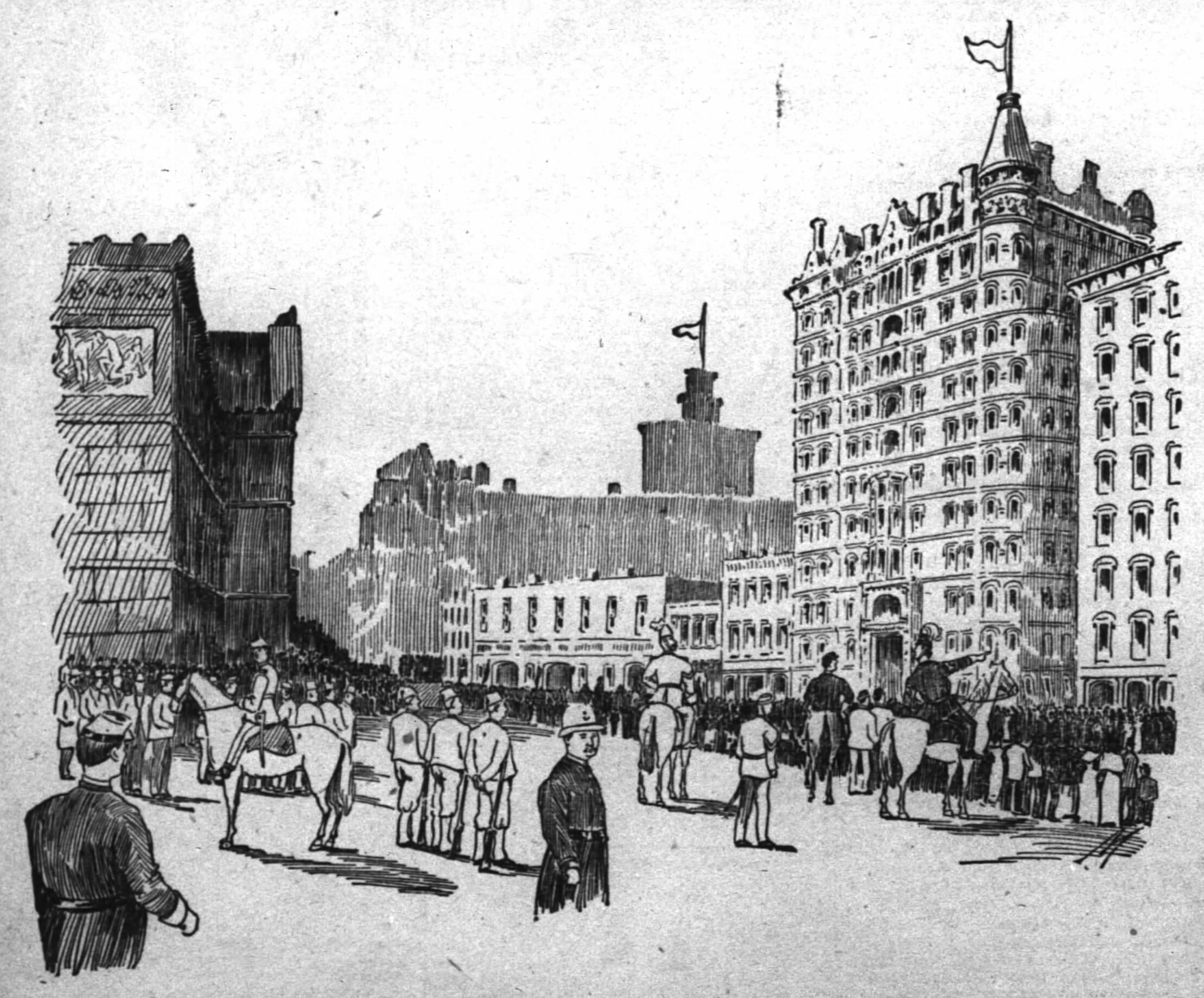
Illustration of Harrison's funeral procession traveling down Michigan Avenue, with the (then-new) Art Institute of Chicago Building at the left and the Auditorium Building visible in the far back

Harrison's corpse was initially displayed at his private residence for visitation by mourners. After a private funeral service held at the residence on the morning of October 31, Harrison's remains were transported to lay in state at the Chicago City Hall building, escorted by an honor guard of city officials. More than 100,000 waited to pay respects to his coffin while it lay in state. The following day, on November 1, Harrison was laid to rest with a massive hours-long 60,000-person funeral procession that was spectated by a crowd estimated to have been between 500,000 and 1 million The funeral ranks among the most-attended in history.

== Prendergast's legal proceedings ==
=== Arraignment ===
On November 2, the grand jury approved an indictment of Prendergast for first-degree murder. Thereafter, on the same day, Prendergast was arraigned before Jude Oliver Horton. Prendergast plead "not guilty". He was described as heavily sweating, trembling, "cowering in terror", and having spoken in a near-whisper when giving his plea.

=== Murder trial ===
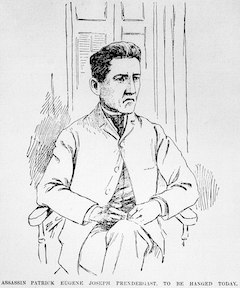
Illustration of Prendergast during the trial

Prendergast was tried for murder in the first degree. His attorneys argued an insanity defense. On December 29, 1893, after quick deliberation the jury delivered a guilty verdict and sentenced Prendergast to death by hanging. His execution was scheduled for March 23.

Prendergast's attorneys motioned for a new trial, citing errors "in admitting incompetent and improper evidence," as well as claiming that testimony that was allowed during the arraignment about Prendergast's conduct had amounted to compelling Prendergast to "give evidence against himself," in violation of the Fifth Amendment to the Constitution of the United States. Judge Brentano considered the motion. On February 24, Brentano denied the motion, sentencing Prendergast to execution on March 23, 1894.

=== Initial appeal attempts ===
Defense counsel for appeals

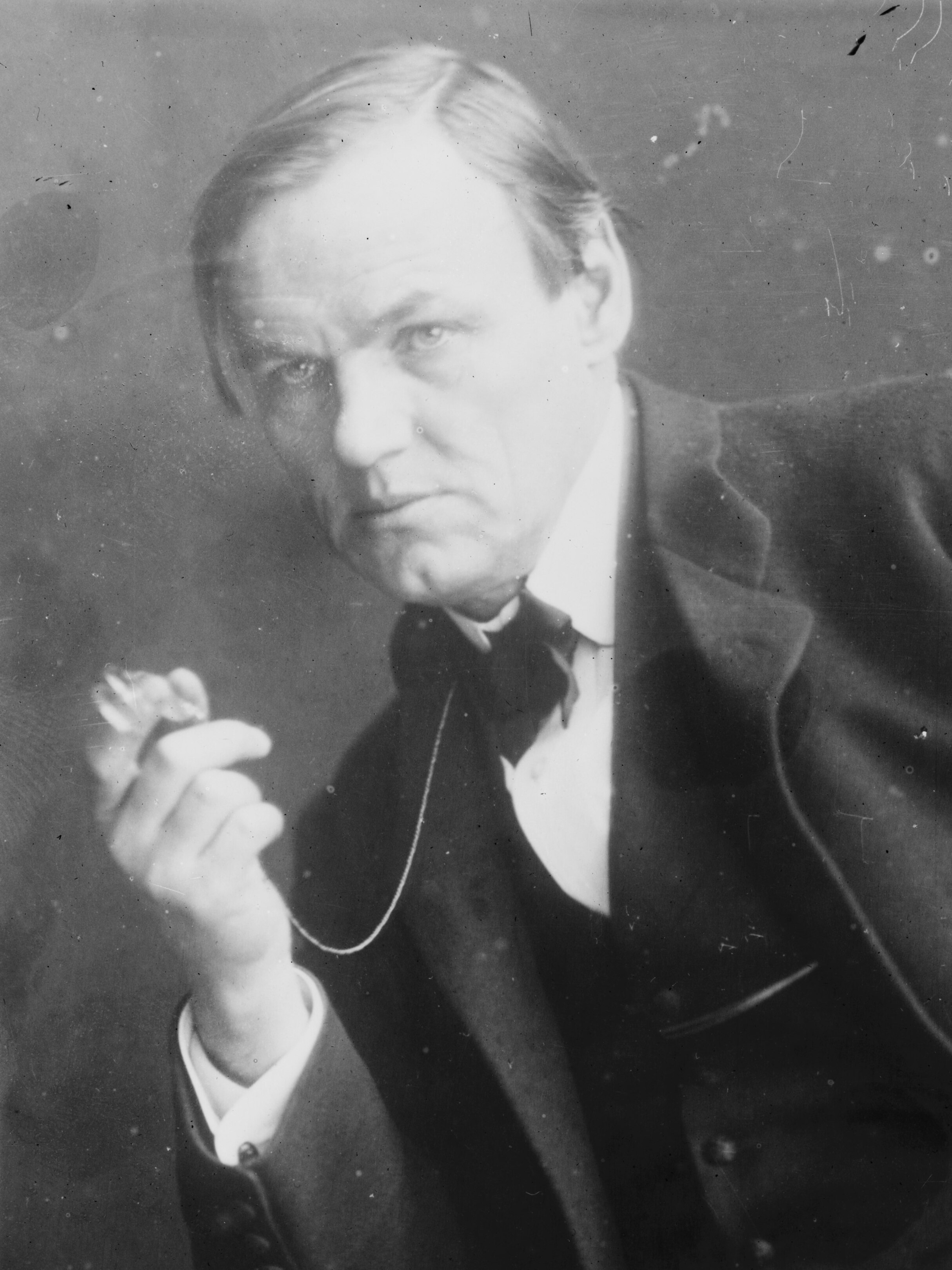
Clarence Darrow (photographed in 1900)

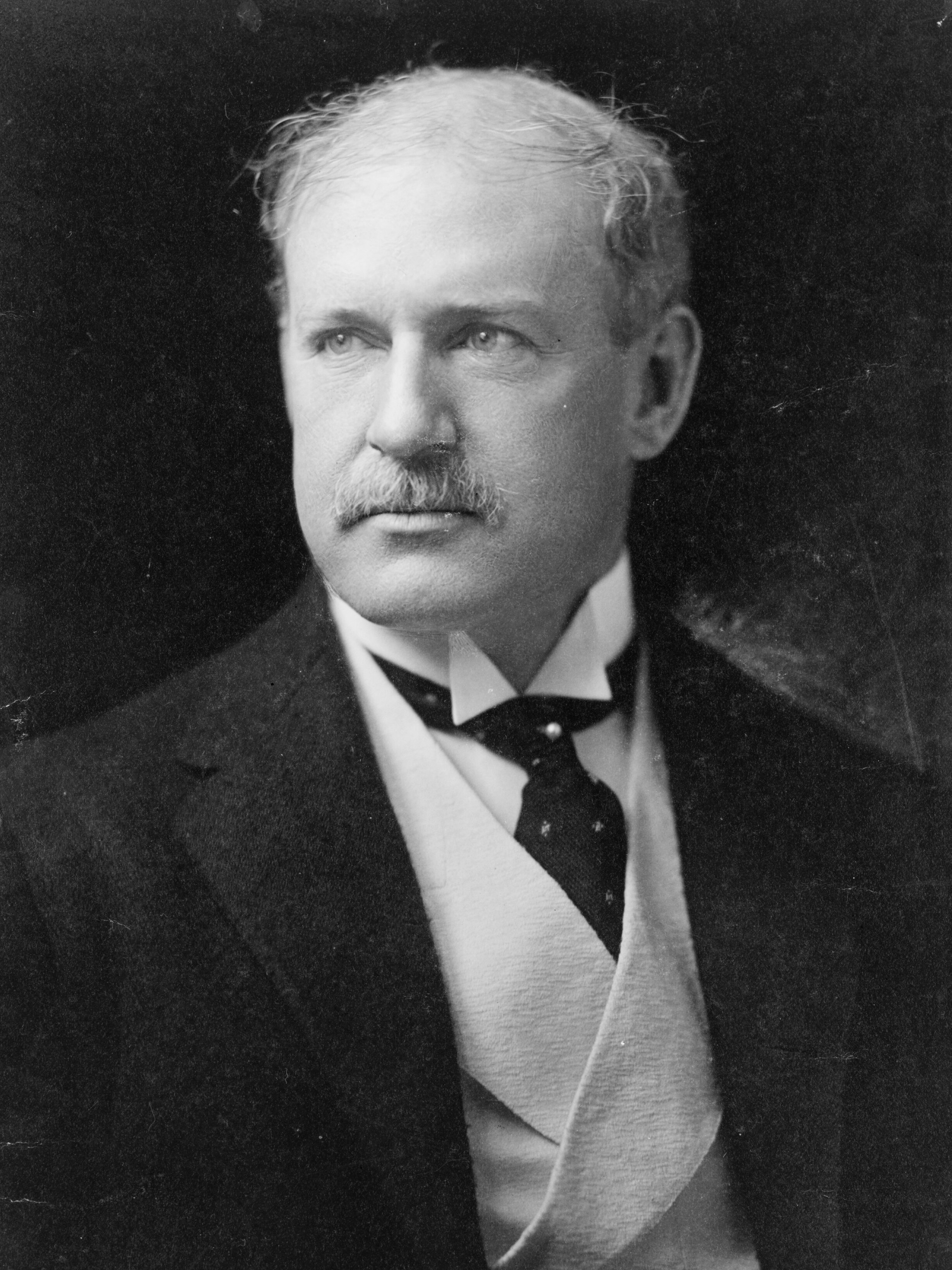
James S. Harlan (photographed in 1904)

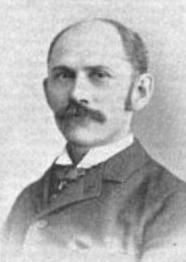
Stephen S. Gregory (illustrated, circa 1904)

Darrow, Harlan, and Gregory began representing Prendergast during the post-trial efforts

By some time in May, Wade had departed from Prendergast's defense and Clarence Darrow had become Prendergast's primary counsel. While it is not clear the exact date when Darrow involved himself in the matter of Prendergast's defense, an article in The New York Times supports that Darrow had involved himself as early as February 1894 in the defense, reporting that Darrow had by February 20 become junior counsel for the defense, and on that date had spoken before the court as part of the defense's arguments to support their motion for a new trial.

Darrow had months earlier left his position as the city's assistant corporation counsel. This was his first murder case, and marked the start of a storied criminal law career for him. Joining Darrow in his representation of Prendergast was James S. Harlan and Stephen S. Gregory. Trude continued as the case's prosecutor. Darrow was among Chicago's most boisterous opponents of capital punishment (the death sentence), but had never before represented a defendant in a murder case.

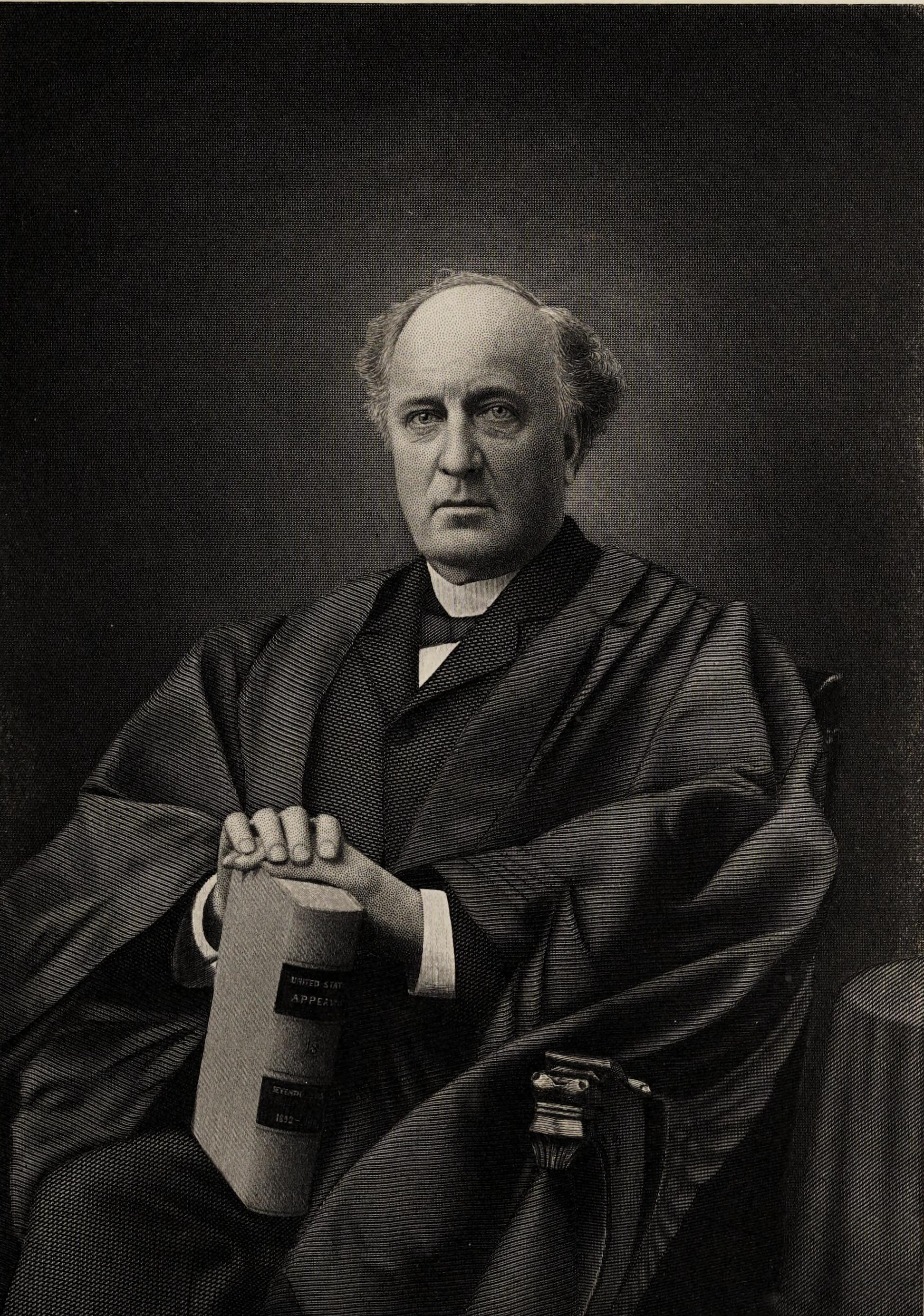
Federal Judge James Graham Jenkins (illustrated, circa 1898) declined to issue a writ of habeas corpus

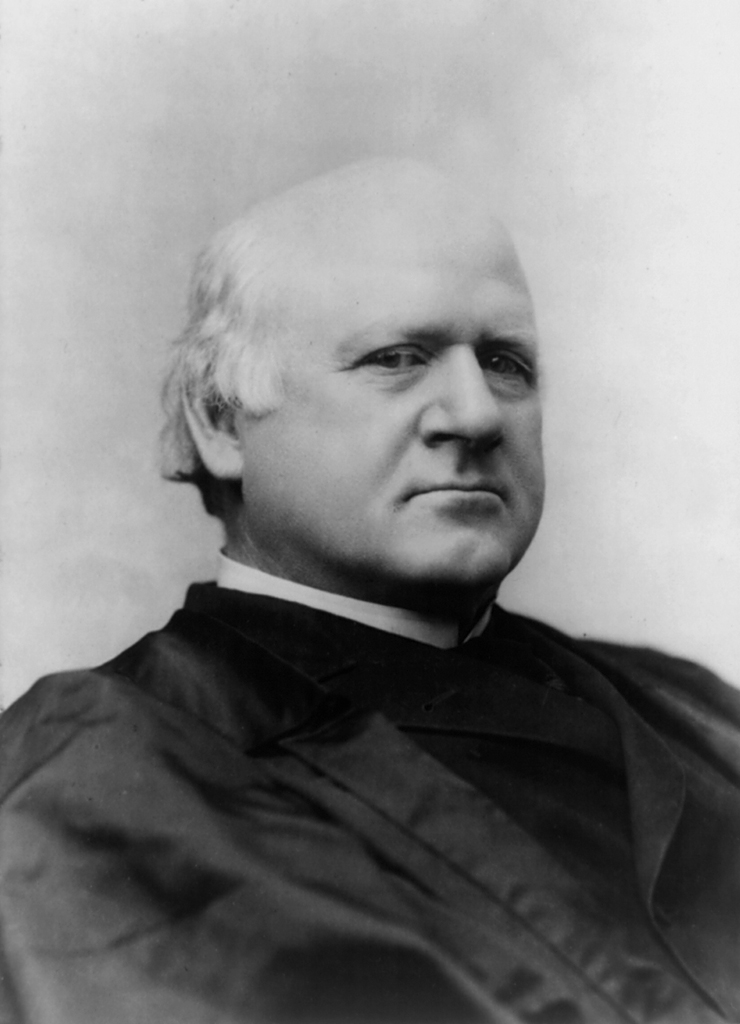
Associate Justice John Marshall Harlan of the Supreme Court of the United States (pictured, circa 1890) also declined to issue a writ of habeas corpus

On March 21, an application for writ of habeas corpus was sent to Judge James Graham Jenkins (of the United States Court of Appeals for the Seventh Circuit) and Justice John Marshall Harlan (Note: Justice Harlan was the father of one of Prendergast's attorneys, James S. Harlan) (associate justice of the United States Supreme Court). After this was denied, Darrow traveled to Springfield, Illinois (the state's capital city) to speak with Lieutenant Governor Joseph B. Gill, in hopes that he could persuade Gill into joining him in lobbying the governor to issue Prendergast a pardon.

On March 22, the eve of the scheduled execution date, the Illinois Supreme Court delivered their refusal to a request that had been made immediately after the trial on Prendergast's behalf that they intervene.

=== Sanity proceeding ===
Also on March 22, Prendergast's brother filed a petition on Prendergast's behalf citing Illinois' section 285 of the (then-current) Illinois Criminal Code, which barred the trial or execution of individuals who become "lunatic or insane" after the commission of a crime for as long as they remain in such a mental state. If he were to be deemed insane, this would forbid Prendergast's death sentence from being carried out until such a point that he would be deemed sane. The statute required a sanity hearing to take place if it appeared that the condemned may have become insane since the verdict sentencing them to death had been delivered.

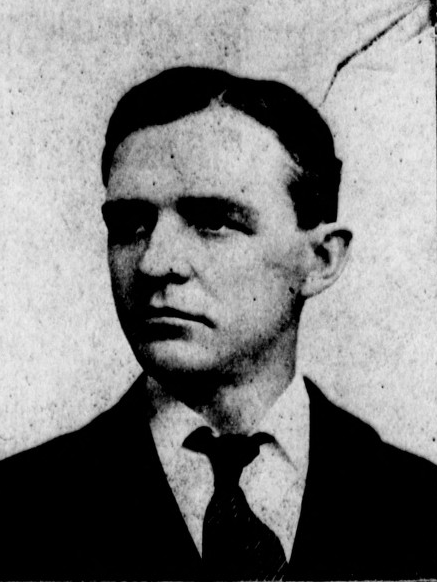
Judge John Barton Payne (pictured, in 1910) presided over the insanity inquiry proceeding

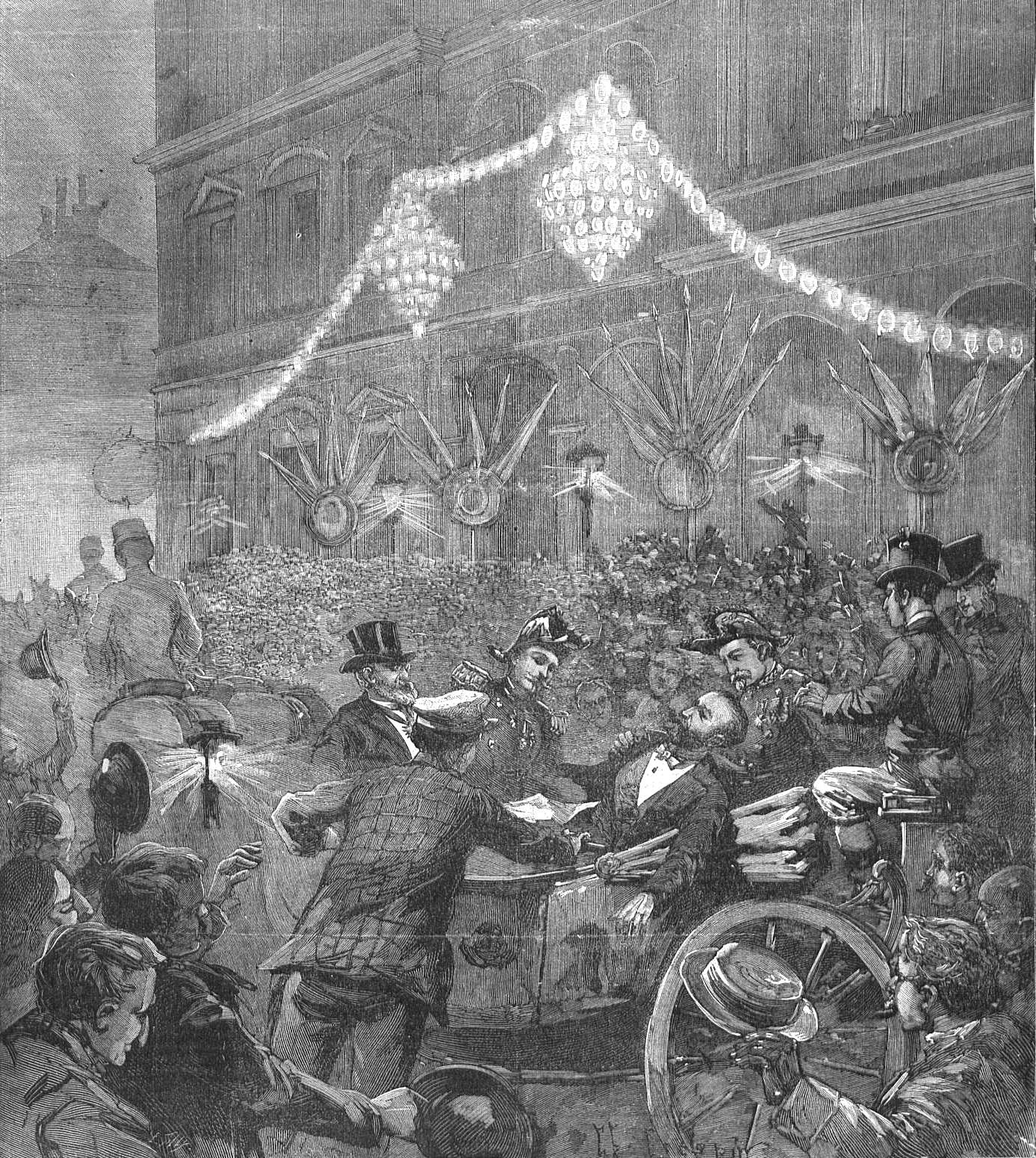
The assassination of French president Sadi Carnot (illustrated above) brought renewed interest in Prendergast's legal proceedings

Late that night, from the Cook County Criminal Court, Judge Arthur H. Chetlain ordered a two-week reprieve; issuing a de lunatico inquirendo –a writ which ordered for an inquiry to be held in which a jury would rule as to whether or not Prendergast was currently insane. If he were currently insane, it would make him ineligible to be executed. This move by Chetlain was highly unexpected, and he faced tremendous backlash for issuing the reprieve. He was accused of philandering and having exceeded his judicial authority. It created a problematic appearance that Chetlian had previously been a legal partner of Stephen S. Gregory, who was now one of Prendgergast's attorneys. In response to criticism, Chetlain recused himself from the matter and the case was given to Judge John Barton Payne.

Following many delays, the sanity proceeding began on June 20, 1894. Despite objections by the defense, Trude was allowed to continue representing the state against Prendergast.

The proceedings received renewed public interest after French president Sadi Carnot was assassinated on June 24. Many had already been concerned after Harrison's assassination that it was part of a perceived trend of violent crimes being committed against officials, with other examples in then-recent years including the assassination of President Garfield and the assassination of Russian Tsar Alexander II.

Richard Allen Morton has written,

Unlike the first trial, where Trude had overwhelmed the defense, Darrow was not intimidated and fought and objected at every point, often to the judge's irritation. He was so vigorous in this regard that he might be trying to lay the groundwork for a possible appeal. Also adding to the rising emotion of the trial were frequent, apparently irrational, punctuations by Prendergast himself, which the newspapers dismissed once again as merely role-playing.

On July 3, the jury delivered a verdict that found Prendergast sane. Prendergast was then scheduled for execution ten days later (on July 13). Darrow made a motion for a new proceeding, which Judge Payne denied. Prendergast's appeal was a rare loss in Darrow's legal career.

=== Further efforts to prevent Prendergast's execution ===
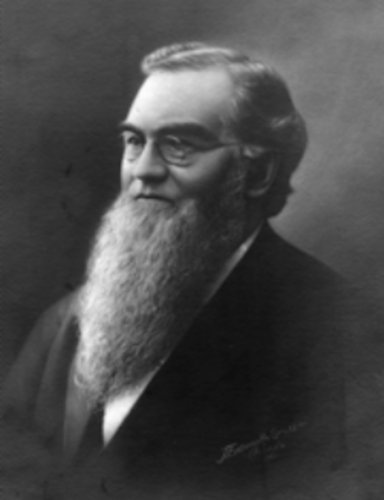
State Justice Joseph M. Bailey (pictured, circa 1895) declined to grant a writ of error or writ of supersedeas.

Immediately after the conclusion of the sanity proceeding, Prendergast's lawyers sent an application to Justice Joseph M. Bailey of the Illinois Supreme Court for a writ of error and writ of supersedeas. Bailey denied this.

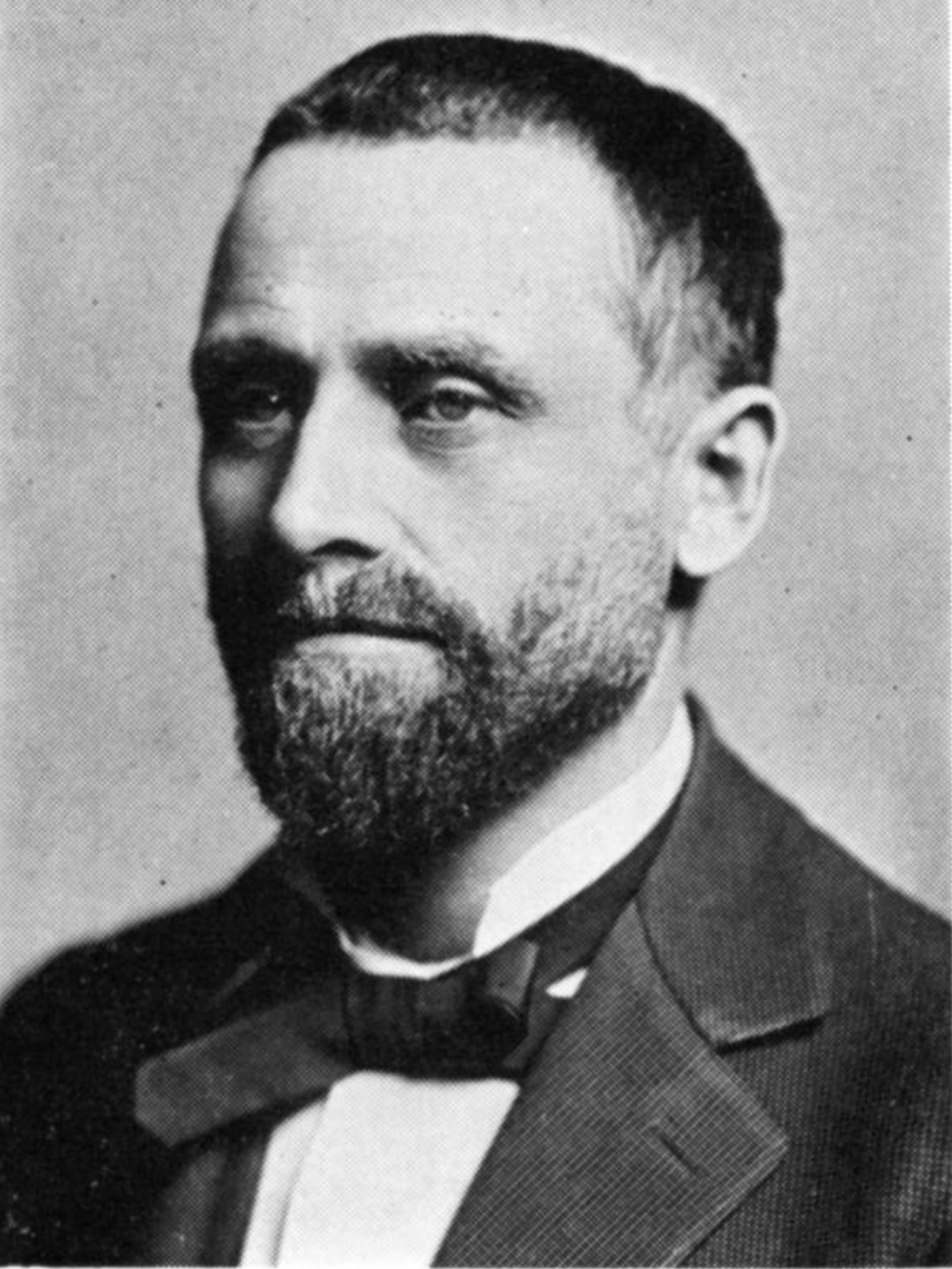
Darrow and Harlan unsuccessfully lobbied Illinois Governor John Peter Altgeld (pictured, circa 1896) for a pardon

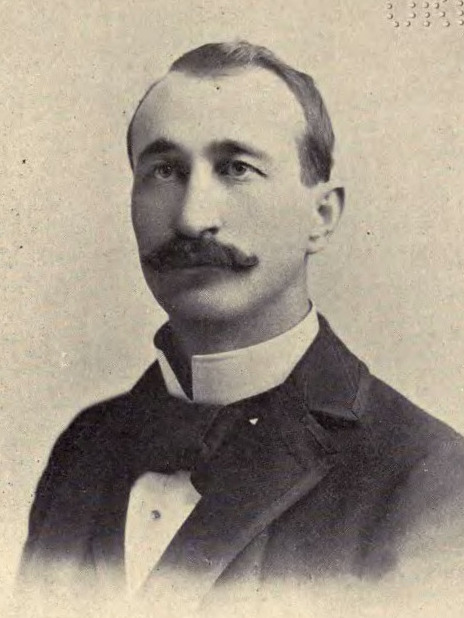
Darrow and Harlan unsuccessfully lobbied Lt. Gov. Joseph B. Gill (pictured, circa 1894–95) to support a pardon

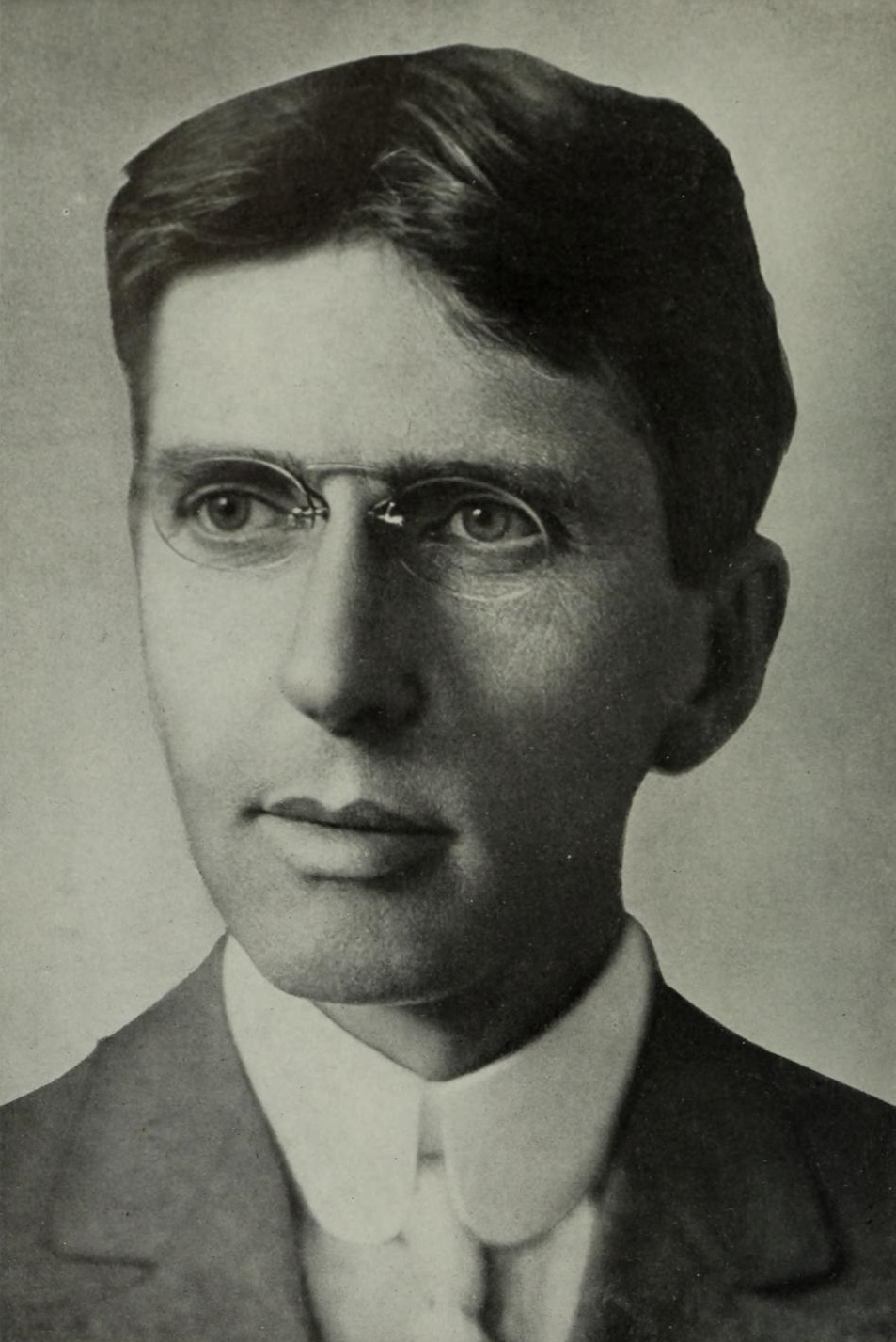
Brand Whitlock (pictured) also lobbied Gill

On July 11, Darrow and Harlan held a morning meeting with Governor John Peter Altgeld in Springfield, but were unsuccessful at persuading Altgeld to issue a pardon. The governor was already suffering damage to his public perception for his pardons of some of those convicted for the Haymarket Riot. Altgeld had been Darrow's law partner, and the year before Darrow had persuaded him to pardon anarchists that had been convicted in relation to the Haymarket affair. Those pardons had caused severe damage to Altgeld's political popularity. Already sinking with Chicago voters for those previous pardons, Altgeld was uninterested in pardoning Prendergast for his slaying of the city's mayor. This was particularly the case because the violent disorder of the then-ongoing Pullman Strike had created an appetite among Chicagoans to see harsh punishment for crime.

Darrow and Harlan also met with Lieutenant Governor Gill to urge him to join them in supporting a pardon. Separately traveling to meet Gill that day to persuade him to support a pardon for Prendergast was Brand Whitlock. Whitlock and Darrow first met that day, beginning a lasting friendship. Gill was unpersuaded, arguing that Prendergast had been given fair and due process and a jury had found him sane.

Federal judge Peter S. Grosscup (pictured, circa 1894) declined to grant a writ of habeas corpus or a stay of execution

A request was made on July 12 to federal judge Peter S. Grosscup (of the United States District Court for the Northern District of Illinois) for a writ of habeas corpus and a request for a stay of execution. in order to permit an appeal to be made to the Supreme Court of the United States under a claim that Prendergast's rights under the Due Process Clause in the Fourteenth Amendment had been denied, pointing to Judge Horton having presented an opinion of his own concerning Prendergast's sanity during the trial and allowed certain evidence regarding the facts of the murder. The request also falsely claimed that Prendergast had not been permitted to speak on his own behalf. In the hearing before Grosscup, strong arguments were made by Prendergast's lawyer. With hours left before Prendergast's scheduled execution, Grosscup refused to stop the execution in a detailed opinion. Grosscup opined that the Fourteenth Amendment was not applicable to "any particular trial but to the action of the Legislature and state polity".

== Execution of Prendergast ==
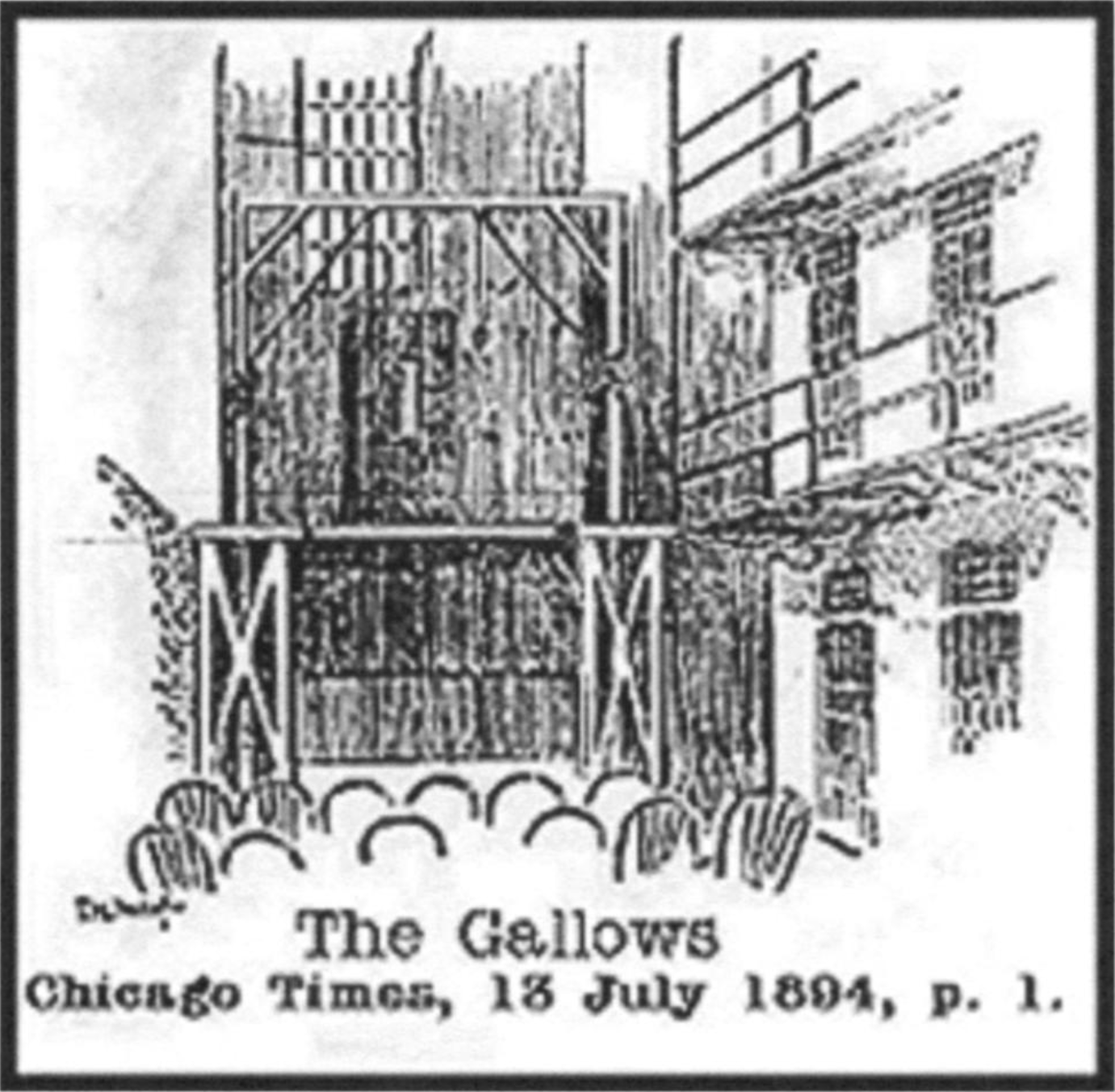
Illustration of the gallows in which Prendergast was hung

Prendergast was hanged on July 13, 1894. A gallows had been constructed in the north corridor of the jail and seats placed between the row of cells along the north side and the high building wall. About 500 ticketed witnesses assembled to watch the execution, which included the members of the jury which convicted Prendergast. Prisoners whose cells faced the corridor where the gallows were erected were removed from their cells 11:00 AM and brought to a location where the execution would not be visible to them. At 11:11, attendees were instructed to extinguish any cigars. At 11:43, the Cook County sheriff gave an order for Prendergast to be escorted to the gallows. When he got to the top of the platform, Prendergast briefly raised his hands, recognizing the crowd that gathered to view his execution. Prendergast walked to the edge of the trap without assistance, where his hands were fastened. Although having previously planned to make a last statement to the crowd, he had been dissuaded by Father Berry, to whom he quietly delivered his last words, "I had no malice against anyone."

Prendergast's feet, knees, and chest were bound with straps and a white shroud placed over him and he was taken onto the trap, where the noose was placed around his neck. A white muslin hood was placed over his head and the noose, obscuring both from view. A signal was given and at 11:48 the rope holding the heavy trap in place was cut. Prendergast's neck was broken by the six-foot drop and his body did not move after the fall. His pulse was taken several times. Before the hanging, his pulse stood at 120 beats per minute (BPM). Prendergast's heart continued to beat for about ten minutes after the trap was released. It decreased to 58 BPM within a minute after the trap was released, but rose to 100 the second minute, 148 the third minute, 160 the fourth minute, before declining gradually thereafter to 100 BPM in the eighth minute. It stopped some time before the twelfth minute. Five minutes later his body was taken down and placed in an awaiting coffin for burial.

The Chicago Daily News reported,

Prendergast retained his nerve to the end and approached his doom without faltering. He made no dying speech on the scaffold and not a word was spoken from the time he stopped on the trap until the end. The drop fell at 11:47 [AM] and the body was cut down at 11:58.

At 12:30 PM, Prendergast's hearse containing the coffin departed from the jail. He was buried at Calvary Cemetery in Evanston, Illinois in an unmarked grave located next to his father's grave.

== Aftermath ==
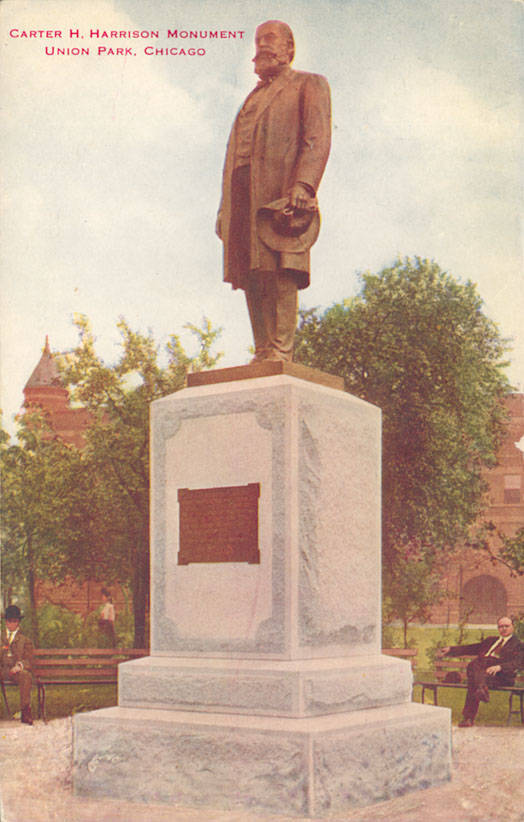
Postcard depiction of the Carter Harrison Memorial, located in Chicago's Union Park, sculpted by Frederick Hibbard

Harrison's death created a void in Chicago city politics that allowed Roger Charles Sullivan and John Patrick Hopkins to grow their political machine within the Democratic Party. Harrison's son, Carter Harrison IV, would run a rival faction of the city's Democratic Party. The Sullivan-Hopkins political machine would, however, grow into the city's dominant political machine, later being headed by Richard J. Daley.

After Harrison's assassination, George Bell Swift (a Republican) was appointed by the city council to serve as acting mayor in early November 1893. In December, Democratic nominee John Patrick Hopkins defeated Bell in the special election to serve the remainder of Harrison's term.

Harrison's namesake son, Carter Harrison IV, would later also be elected mayor of Chicago five times. Like Harrison III, Harrison IV served for two separate stretches of time, first in 1897–1905 and again in 1911–1915. Harrison IV held similar politics to his father.

Harrison's assassination inspired Chicago priest Casimir Zeglen to begin developing his design for a bulletproof vest.

Harrison is the first of two Chicago mayors to be assassinated: the second being Anton Cermak, who was assassinated in 1933 while standing near (then-U.S. President-elect) Franklin D. Roosevelt at an event in Miami, Florida. That assassination is speculated to have possibly been meant to instead target the president-elect. It coincidentally occurred only months before Chicago opened the gates of its second world's exposition (the Century of Progress).

For many decades, Harrison's assassination was regarded as a significant and well-known moment in United States history. However, it has since fallen into relative obscurity.

A bronze sculpture honoring Harrison is located in Chicago's Union Park. It was erected in 1907 using money raised by the Carter H. Harrison Memorial Association, which was formed in 1897. The sculpture was created by Frederick Hibbard, and was his first significant public artwork. The eight-foot tall sculpture depicts a standing Harrison, and is placed high atop a pedestal made of granite.

The appellate litigation that followed Prendergast's conviction set significant new state and federal legal precedent.

Thirty-three years later, Darrow would repurpose much of his rhetoric from Prendergast's case while defending murderers Leopold and Loeb. He also wrote about Prendergast in his 1932 autobiography. Prendergast's was the only individual that Darrow represented to be given a death sentence.

In a 2003 journal article published in The Journal of Criminal Law & Criminology, Chicago politician Edward M. Burke described speculation about the broader ramifications Harrison's assassination may have had on the course of American history,

It is speculated, for instance, that had [Harrison] not died in 1894, he, not William Jennings Bryan, would have been the candidate of Altgeld (Note: referring to Illinois Governor Altgeld's support for Bryan at the 1896 Democratic National Convention) and the Democrats in 1896. His sturdy achievements as a tested big city mayor, and his family's presidential pedigree... (Note: Harrison bore family relation to U.S. presidents Benjamin Harrison and William Henry Harrison,) might have been just the thing to put him over the edge against William Mckinley that year [in the general election]. Who knows how that might have altered American history. It certainly would have altered Teddy Roosevelt's [becoming president after McKinley's 1901 assassination].

== Media depictions ==
On occasion, the assassination and its aftermath has been depicted in media. In the 1991 made-for-TV movie Darrow (which starred Kevin Spacey as Clarence Darrow) Prendergast's sanity hearing was dramatized and Prendergast was portrayed by actor Paul Klementowicz. The assassination is one of the subplots in Erik Larson's 2003 best-selling non-fiction book The Devil in the White City.
