= Casimir Zeglen =

Inventor of a silk bulletproof vest

The Reverend Casimir Zeglen CR
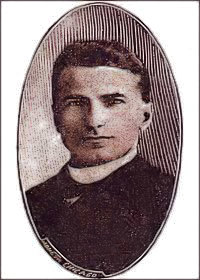
- Born: Kazimierz Żegleń; March 4, 1869; Kaczanówka, Austrian Poland (now Ukraine)
- Died: 1927 (aged 57–58) unknown
- Education: Warsaw University of Technology
- Occupation: priest
- Known for: invention of bulletproof vest

Casimir Zeglen, CR (Polish: Kazimierz Żegleń; 4 March 1869 – before 1927) was a Polish Catholic priest who invented a silk bulletproof vest in the late 19th century. He was a vowed member of the Resurrectionists.

== Life and career ==
Born on 4 March 1869 in Kaczanówka near Tarnopol, then part of the Kingdom of Galicia and Lodomeria within Austria-Hungary. In 1887, at the age of 18, he entered the Resurrectionist Order in Lwów (today Lviv, Ukraine), a decision that his father did not approve of. In 1890, he moved to the United States. He was the pastor of St. Stanislaus Kostka Catholic Church in Chicago, then the largest Polish church in the country, with 40,000 in the parish.

In his early twenties, he began experimenting with cloth armour, using steel shavings, moss, and hair. In his research, he came upon the work of Dr. George E. Goodfellow, who had written about the bullet-resistive properties of silk. In 1893, after the assassination of Carter Harrison Sr., the mayor of Chicago, he worked on an improved silk bulletproof vest. He had previously conducted experiments with a number of materials, including bristles, steel wool, wool and cotton but the only result he achieved was a rather stiff piece of clothing that did not resemble a modern vest in any way. In 1897, he went into partnership with Jan Szczepanik. Though the two parted ways, with Zeglen focusing on the United States and Szczepanik on Europe, a carriage covered with Szczepanik's bulletproof armour saved the life of Alfonso XIII, the King of Spain, when a bomb exploded near it.

In his mid-thirties Zeglen discovered a way to weave silk, to enable it to capture bullets, while visiting weaving mills in Vienna, Austria and Aachen, Germany. A 1/8 in (3.175 mm) thick, four-ply bulletproof vest produced there was able to protect the wearer from the lower velocity pistol bullets of that era. Zeglen offered a vest to President McKinley, who refused the gift, while Archduke Franz Ferdinand chose not to wear his vest when shot: tests and analysis suggest wearing a vest might have saved both.

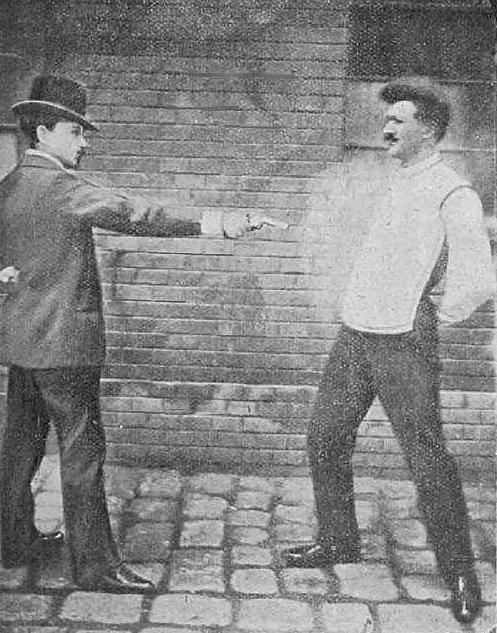
Tests of the bulletproof vest by Jan Szczepanik and Żegleń in 1901—Mr. Borzykowski (friend of Szczepanik) shoots his servant.

He died in 1927.

== Remembrance ==
In 2007, Zeglen and his work was discussed in a documentary series Weaponology aired on Discovery Channel and devoted to the development of firemarms. He appeared in Episode 2 (Body Armor) in the first season of the program.

In 2008, Zeglen and his legacy was the subject of a program Oblicza Ameryki (Faces of America) created as a joint project between Polsat 2 and a Chicago-based Polish-language television channel with historian of technology Sławomir Łotysz as the expert.

== See also ==
- List of Poles
- Timeline of Polish science and technology

== Sources ==
- "Three Grades of Fabric", Brooklyn Eagle, 9 October 1902
- Łotysz, Sławomir. "Mnich wynalazca" (Monk-inventor). Polonia (Chicago) Vol. 13, No. 1-2 (2007) pp. 68–71, and Vol. 14, No. 3-4 (2007) pp. 64–67.
- Articles in Nowy Dziennik (a Polish Daily News) published in New York City): Kuloodporny ksiądz (Bulletproof priest), 5 May 2006; Polski ksiądz i Polski Edison (A Polish priest and the Polish Edison), 13 May 2006; Od habitu do opony (From a Religious habit to a tire), 20 May 2006.
