= Kachanivka, Ternopil Oblast =

Rural locality in Ternopil Oblast, Ukraine

Kachanivka Качанівка
- Location in Ternopil Oblast
- Coordinates: 49°28′2″N 26°7′0″E
- Country: Ukraine
- Oblast: Ternopil Oblast
- Raion: Ternopil Raion
- Hromada: Pidvolochysk settlement hromada
- Time zone: UTC+2 (EET)
  - Summer (DST): UTC+3 (EEST)
- Postal code: 47852

Kachanivka (Ukrainian: Качанівка) is a village in Pidvolochysk settlement hromada, Ternopil Raion, Ternopil Oblast, Ukraine.

== History ==
The first written mention of the village was in 1546.

After the liquidation of the Pidvolochysk Raion on 19 July 2020, the village became part of the Ternopil Raion.

== Religion ==
- St. Michael church (1863, brick, OCU and UGCC),
- St. Michael church (1798, reconstructed in 1920 and 1991, RCC).

== Notable residents ==
- Casimir Zeglen (1869–1910), Polish Catholic priest who invented a silk bulletproof vest in the late 19th century

The composer, conductor, and public figure Ostap Nyzhankivskyi served as the village's parish priest; in 1898 and 1913 Ivan Franko visited the village.

== Sources ==
- (in Ukrainian) Гаврилюк О., о. Шаварин М., Качанівка // Ternopil Encyclopedic Dictionary: in 4 v. / editorial board: H. Yavorskyi and other, Ternopil: "Zbruch", 2008, V. 3: П—Я, S. 56. — ISBN 978-966-528-279-2.
- "Kaczanówka, pow. skałacki". Geographical Dictionary of the Kingdom of Poland (in Polish). 3. Warszawa: Kasa im. Józefa Mianowskiego. 1882. p. 653.
