= Thomas A. Russell =

American politician

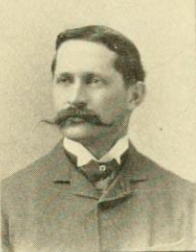
Thomas Russell, c. 1894

Thomas A. Russell (June 17, 1858 – April 8, 1938) was an American attorney who was the first law clerk at the Supreme Court of the United States.

Russell was born in Boston, Massachusetts, on June 17, 1858. His father, William Goodwin Russell, was a descendant of Mayflower passengers Myles Standish and John Alden.

In 1882, Russell graduated from Harvard Law School, and then became the first Supreme Court law clerk when he worked for Justice Horace Gray from 1882 to 1883. After his clerkship, Russell returned to Boston and from 1883 to 1886 worked for his father's law firm of Russell & Putnam. He then worked in private practice from 1896 to 1900.

In 1893 and 1894, Russell was elected from Suffolk County district 11 to the Massachusetts House of Representatives as a Republican, where he served as chairman of the Committee on Elections.

Russell died April 8, 1938, in Boston.

== See also ==
- List of law clerks for the second seat of the Supreme Court of the United States
