= Clarence M. York =

American lawyer

- Died: June 20, 1906 (aged 38)
- Education: National University School of Law
- Occupations: Lawyer; Supreme Court Law clerk

Clarence Melville York (November 24, 1867 – June 20, 1906) was an American attorney who, in the 1890s, was one of the first law clerks to the justices of the Supreme Court of the United States.

York was born in Vineland, New Jersey, on November 24, 1867, and moved to Washington, D.C., in 1887.

In June 1889, York graduated with a LL.B. from National University School of Law (now the George Washington University Law School) in Washington, D.C. In 1890, he was a clerk at the United States General Land Office. From 1890 to 1896, York was a Supreme Court law clerk to Chief Justice Melville Fuller. He then clerked for Associate Justice Stephen Johnson Field from 1896 to 1897, before returning to clerk to Fuller from 1897 to 1905. York is the longest-serving law clerk for the Court, his record of 17 years service equaled only by Frederick J. Haig.

On June 20, 1906, York died in Washington, D.C.

== See also ==
- List of law clerks for the chief justice of the United States
- List of law clerks for the ninth seat of the Supreme Court of the United States
