= Consumers Building =

Office skyscraper in Chicago, Illinois

- U.S. Historic district – Contributing property
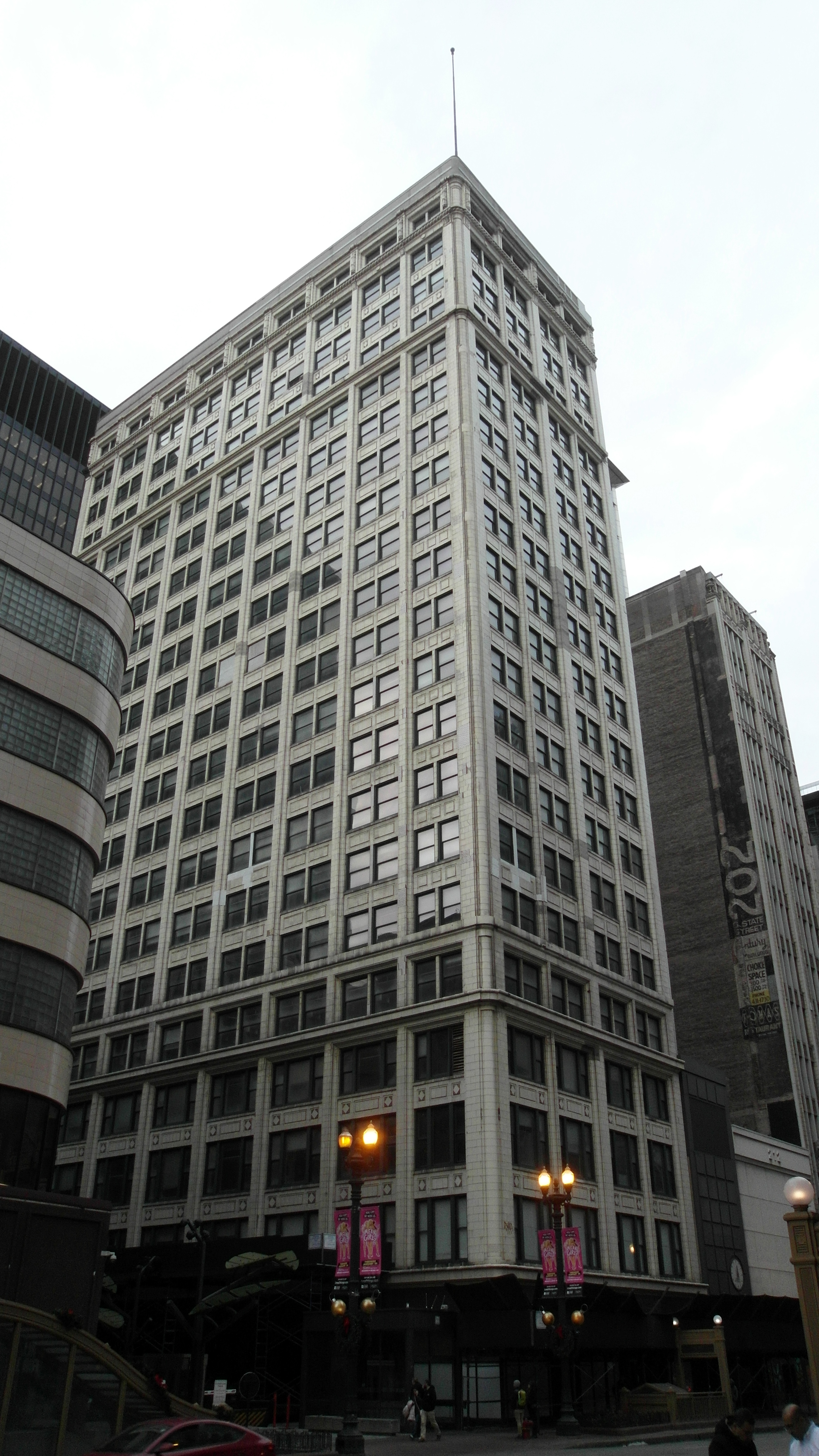
- Interactive map of Consumers Building
- Part of: Loop Retail Historic District (ID98001351)
- Building details

General information
- Architectural style: Chicago School
- Location: 220 S. State Street, Chicago, Illinois
- Coordinates: 41°52′44.3″N 87°37′41.1″W
- Completed: 1913

Height
- Height: 291 feet (89 m)

Technical details
- Floor count: 21
- Floor area: 176,000 sq ft (16,400 m^{2})

Design and construction
- Architect: Jenney, Mundie & Jensen

The Consumers Building is a Chicago school high rise office building in the Chicago Loop. It was designed by Jenney, Mundie & Jensen, and was built by Jacob L. Kesner in 1913. The building is owned by the General Services Administration and currently sits vacant. It is a contributing property to the Loop Retail Historic District.

In 2022, the building was proposed to be demolished, with $52 million (Note: equivalent to $57.2 million in 2025.) earmarked for tearing down both the Consumers Building and the neighboring Century Building.

== History ==
Early tenants included the Consumers Company, which occupied the 20th and 21st floors, the Hilton Company, a men's clothing retailer which occupied the corner store, Remington Typewriter Company, and film companies Mutual, Paramount, Pathé, and Universal. A sixty foot electric sign on the roof of the building advertised the Consumers Company. A. Weis & Company operated the Winter Garden, an upscale restaurant located in the basements of the Consumers Building and the adjacent 214 South State Street building, which Kesner had purchased to ensure a skyscraper would not be built there.

In the 1920s, the Allied Amusements Association, an association of motion picture and vaudeville theatre owners, had offices on the building's 13th floor. Other tenants in the 1920s included Carnation Milk, the Cooperative stores, Integrity Mutual Insurance Co., Liberty Mutual, and the Pullman Company. In 1931, men's clothing store Benson & Rixon began renting 5,000 square feet of space on the ground floor. In 1936, Benson & Rixon left the building and was replaced by another men's clothing retailer, Howard Clothes. Benson & Rixon moved to 206-12 S. State St., before moving to their newly built store at 230 S. State St. the following year. Howard Clothes remained in the Consumers Building through the 1970s.

In 1931, title to the building was transferred to Kesner's son in law, I.W. Kahn, who headed the Kesner Realty Trust. The trust defaulted on its lease, and in 1937, title to the building was turned over to the owners of the ground leases. In 1947, the building was sold to the 220 S. State St. Corporation for $2 million. (Note: equivalent to $28.8 million in 2025.)

In 1948, the Federal Mediation and Conciliation Service moved its offices into the Consumers Building. The building was also home to the College of Jewish Studies in the 1940s.

In 1960, a group of Chicago investors purchased the building for $2 million. (Note: equivalent to $21.8 million in 2025.) The building later served as home to the Illinois Public Action Council, the Chicago Public High School for Metropolitan Studies, and the regional office of the Community Relations Service. In 1976, the building was sold to a group of Chicago businessmen for $2 million. (Note: equivalent to $11.3 million in 2025.)

In 2005, the General Services Administration acquired the Consumers Building and neighboring buildings, using eminent domain to seize some of the properties, citing the need for increased security around the Dirksen Federal Building. In 2011 and 2013, Preservation Chicago listed the Consumers Building and the nearby Century Building as one of Chicago's 7 most endangered buildings.

In 2017, CA Ventures reached an agreement to purchase the Consumers Building, the Century Building, and the two smaller buildings in between, for $10.38 million. (Note: equivalent to $13.6 million in 2025.) The Consumers Building and Century Building would have been converted to apartments, as part of a $141 million (Note: equivalent to $185 million in 2025.) redevelopment project, while the historic Streamline Moderne storefront of 214 South State St. would have been restored and incorporated into a 25,000 square-foot structure built between the taller buildings for retail and commercial use. Under the terms of the agreement, the City of Chicago would purchase the buildings from the federal government and then immediately sell them to CA Ventures. However, the City of Chicago backed out of the agreement in December 2019, citing security concerns at the nearby Dirksen Federal Building.

In 2022, Preservation Chicago listed the Consumers Building and the nearby Century Building as one of Chicago's 7 most endangered buildings, after a $52 million (Note: equivalent to $57.2 million in 2025.) federal earmark to demolish the buildings was revealed.

== See also ==
- National Register of Historic Places listings in Chicago
