= Century Building (Chicago) =

Skyscraper in Chicago

- U.S. Historic district – Contributing property
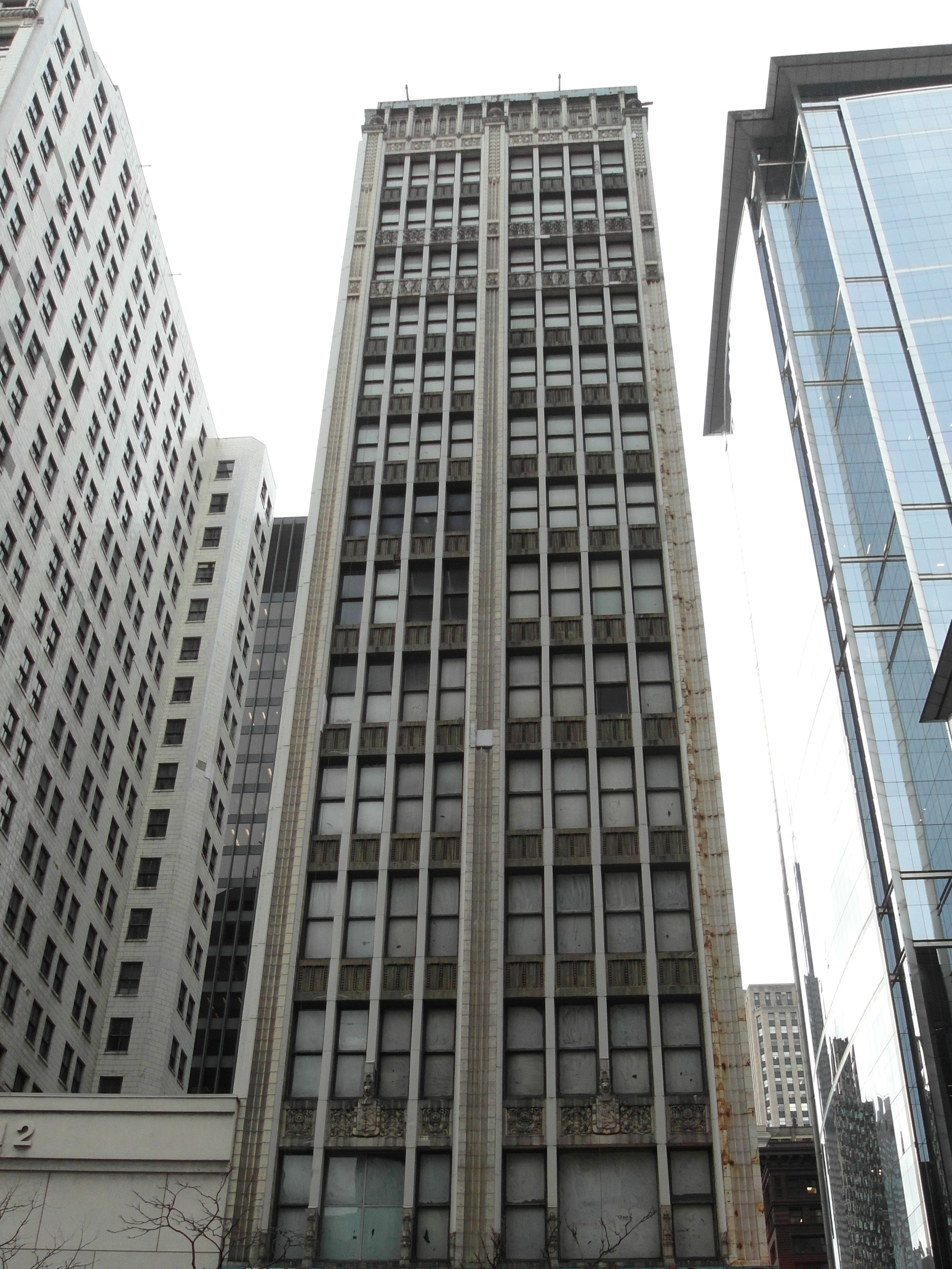
- Interactive map of Century Building
- Part of: Loop Retail Historic District (ID98001351)
- Building details

General information
- Architectural style: Chicago School
- Location: 202 S. State Street, Chicago, Illinois
- Coordinates: 41°52′45.6″N 87°37′40.8″W
- Completed: 1915

Height
- Height: 185.45 feet (56.53 m)

Technical details
- Floor count: 16

Design and construction
- Architect: Holabird & Roche
- Engineer: Henry J. Burt

The Century Building is a high rise office building in Chicago's Loop. It was designed by Holabird & Roche, and was built in 1915. It is a contributing property to the Loop Retail Historic District. The building is representative of the transition of Chicago high rise design from the Chicago School to Art Deco, and its north and east facades feature Neo-Manueline ornamentation. It is owned by the United States Federal Government and administered by the General Services Administration. It currently sits vacant.

In 2022, the building was proposed to be demolished, with $52 million earmarked for tearing down both the Century Building and the neighboring Consumers Building.

== History ==
Originally known as the Buck & Rayner Building or the Twentieth Century Building, the building was completed in 1915. Buck & Rayner was a Chicago chain of drug stores, and commissioned the construction of the building. It occupied the corner store and basement. In 1917, Lake and State Savings Bank signed a twenty-year lease for the building's second floor. The bank's name was changed to the Century Trust and Savings Bank, and the building's name was changed to the Century Building.

Home Federal Savings and Loan purchased the Century Building in 1950, and moved its headquarters into the building on June 30, 1952. Home Federal occupied the first five floors, as well as the two floors below street level. The building's name was officially changed to the Home Federal Building. In 1958, Home Federal Savings and Loan purchased the Republic Building across State Street. The Republic Building was demolished and a new 16 story building was constructed. Home Federal Savings and Loan moved its headquarters to the new building on December 17, 1962.

The building has also served as home to the headquarters of the Gideons International, Local 66 of the Elevator Operators and Starters Union, the main offices of Sterling Cleaners and Dyers, the Audit Bureau of Circulations, a Liggett's drug store, Family Loan Corporation, May Jewelers, Romas Restaurant, the Illinois Migrant Council, the National Alliance of Black Feminists, and the local office of the Guardian Angels.

Jesse Jackson's Chicago headquarters were in the Century Building during his 1984 presidential campaign.

In 2003, Marc Realty Co. purchased the building from Mitchell Macks for $1.25 million. In 2005, the General Services Administration used eminent domain to seize the Century Building, also acquiring other nearby buildings, citing the need for increased security around the Dirksen Federal Building. In 2011 and 2013, Preservation Chicago listed the Century Building and the nearby Consumers Building as one of Chicago's 7 most endangered buildings.

In 2017, CA Ventures reached an agreement to purchase the Century Building, the Consumers Building, and the two smaller buildings in between, for $10.38 million. The Century Building and Consumers Building would have been converted to apartments, as part of a $141 million redevelopment project, while the historic Streamline Moderne storefront of 214 South State Street would have been restored and incorporated into a 25,000 square-foot structure built between the taller buildings for retail and commercial use. Under the terms of the agreement, the City of Chicago would purchase the buildings from the federal government and then immediately sell them to CA Ventures. However, the City of Chicago backed out of the agreement in December 2019, citing security concerns at the nearby Dirksen Federal Building.

In 2022, Preservation Chicago listed the Century Building and the nearby Consumers Building as one of Chicago's 7 most endangered buildings, after a $52 million federal earmark to demolish the buildings was revealed.

== See also ==
- National Register of Historic Places listings in Chicago
