= Marshall Field's (disambiguation) =

Marshall Field's was a department store in Chicago, Illinois.

Marshall Field's may also refer to:

- Marshall Field (1834–1906), founder of the Chicago, Illinois department store
- Marshall Field (disambiguation), lists the several descendants of Marshall Field with the same name
- Marshall Field's Wholesale Store, a now demolished landmark building in Chicago, Illinois
- McDonald's Thanksgiving Parade, formerly known as the Marshall Field's Jingle Elf Parade
- Marshall Fields (White House intruder), man involved in a 1974 Christmas Day intrusion into the grounds of the White House complex in Washington, D.C.

== See also ==
- Marshall Field and Company Building
- Marshall Field and Company Store (Oak Park, Illinois)
