= Field marshall =

Field marshall may refer to:

- Misspelling of field marshal, a military rank
- Field Marshall, a tractor

== See also ==
- Marshall Field (disambiguation)
