= Alfred S. Alschuler =

American architect (1876–1940)

Alfred Samuel Alschuler (November 2, 1876 – June 11, 1940) was a Chicago architect.

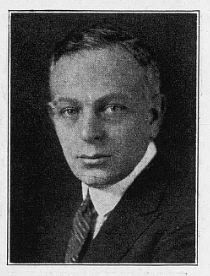

== Biography ==
Alschuler was born in Chicago to Samuel and Fannie (Guggenheimer) Alschuler. He was educated in the public school system. He graduated with a Master in Science from the Armour Institute of Technology in 1899 and spent a year studying architecture at the Art Institute of Chicago. In 1900, he began his career as a draftsman for famed architect Dankmar Adler. Alschuler studied under Adler for five years before joining the firm of Samuel Treat for two years. Alschuler opened his own office in 1907. Also in 1907, he married Rose Haas; they had five children.

His designs included warehouses, department stores, industrial buildings, synagogues, and offices. Alschuler's legacy lives on in the form of historically significant buildings such as the London Guaranty & Accident Building (1922–23) at the intersection of N. Michigan Avenue and Wacker Drive.

The Chicago Mercantile Exchange Building (1927), another of Alschuler's acclaimed commercial buildings, suffered a less fortunate fate; The Merc was demolished in 2003, despite a spirited set of protests organized by local preservation groups. The silver lining of The Merc's demolition was the creation of a new Chicago law which provides the Landmarks Commission a 90-day period to review and potentially save historically significant buildings. Other significant industrial and commercial works by Alschuler include the Bull Dog and Whistle Restaurant, Brach's Candy Factory, the Florsheim Shoe Factory, the Garment Center Building, and the Benson-Rixon Department Store.

Alschuler was also an accomplished designer of Jewish synagogues in the Chicago area, including the current K.A.M. Isaiah Israel Temple, Agudath Achim Bikur Cholim Synagogue, B'nai Sholom, Anshe Emet Synagogue, Am Shalom in Glencoe, and Am Echod in Waukegan.

A member of the American Institute of Architects, Alfred S. Alschuler died on June 11, 1940, near age 64, in Chicago. His son John also trained as an architect, as did Alfred S. Alschuler Jr.. Several of Alschuler's works are listed on the U.S. National Register of Historic Places. One of which was the KAM Isaiah Israel Synagogue

== Notable works ==
The following is a partial list of known works by Alfred S. Alschuler:

- Maurice L. Rothschild Building (now part of John Marshall Law School (Chicago)), 300-306 S. State St. (built in three phases, 1906, 1910 and 1928)
- Anshe Emet Synagogue, 3760 N. Pine Grove Avenue, Chicago (1910)
- Shops Building, 21 N. Wabash Ave., Chicago (1912)
- John R. Thompson Building, 350 N. Clark St., Chicago (1912)
- Chicago Sinai Temple (now Mt. Pisgah M.B. Church), 4622 S. Martin Luther King Dr., Chicago (1912)
- Donohue Building Annex, 727 S. Dearborn St., Chicago (1913)
- Thomas Flyer Garage and Service Building, 2255 S. Michigan Ave., Chicago (1916 addition)
- Goldblatt Bros. Department Store, a.k.a. Larkin Store Building, 4700 S. Ashland Ave., Chicago, Illinois (1914) NRHP listed
- John Sexton & Co. a.k.a. Sexton Foods Building, Illinois & Orleans Chicago, Illinois (1916/1928)
- Pelouze Building, 230 E. Ohio St., Chicago (1917)
- Henry E. Legler Regional Branch of the Chicago Public Library, 115 S. Pulaski Rd., Chicago, Illinois (1919) NRHP listed
- Torco Building (upper 7 floors only), 624 S. Michigan Ave., Chicago (1922)
- Atwell Building (then Atwell Printing & Binding Company & Rotary International; 1950s, Pentron Corporation & Revere Camera Company; 1960s, 3M; 2001-present, Prairie Avenue Lofts), 221 E Cullerton St., Chicago (1922)
- London Guaranty & Accident Building, Chicago (1923)
- Hartman Building, 30 E. Adams St., Chicago (1933)
- Furniture Exhibition Building, a.k.a. American Furniture Mart, 680 N. Lake Shore Dr. (eastern wing, 1923; western wing and tower, 1926)
- K.A.M. Isaiah Israel Temple, 1100 E. Hyde Park Blvd., Chicago (1924)
- Century Building, 808 N. Old World Third St, 230 W. Wells St, Milwaukee (1925)
- 33 East Congress Building, a.k.a. Congress-Wabash Building, Chicago (1925–26)
- Michigan and Lake Building, 180 N. Michigan Ave., Chicago (1926)
- Florsheim Shoe Company Factory, 3963 W. Belmont Ave., Chicago (1926)
- Hart, Schaffner and Marx Building, 728 W. Jackson Blvd., Chicago (1926)
- Igoe Building, 600 W. Van Buren St., Chicago (1926? addition built 1928 at 328 S. Jefferson St.)
- Chicago Mercantile Exchange Building, Chicago (1927)
- Hudson Motor Co. Building, 2228 S. Michigan Ave., Chicago (1928)
- Marmon-Chicago Showroom, 2230 S. Michigan Ave., Chicago (1928)
- Finchley Co. Men's Store Building, a.k.a. O'Malley Place, 23 E. Jackson Blvd. (1928)
- Harrison Hotel and Garage, 601 S. Wabash Ave., Chicago (1930)
- Benson & Rixon Building, 230 S. State St., Chicago (1937)
- Henry W. Austin Branch, Chicago Public Library, 5615 W. Race Ave., Chicago
- Lerman Building, 3045 N. Lincoln Ave., Chicago
- Richard Churchill House, 1214 Green Bay Rd., Highland Park, Illinois, NRHP-listed
- Park View Manor Apartments, 6834 S. South Shore Dr., Chicago
