= 214 South State Street =

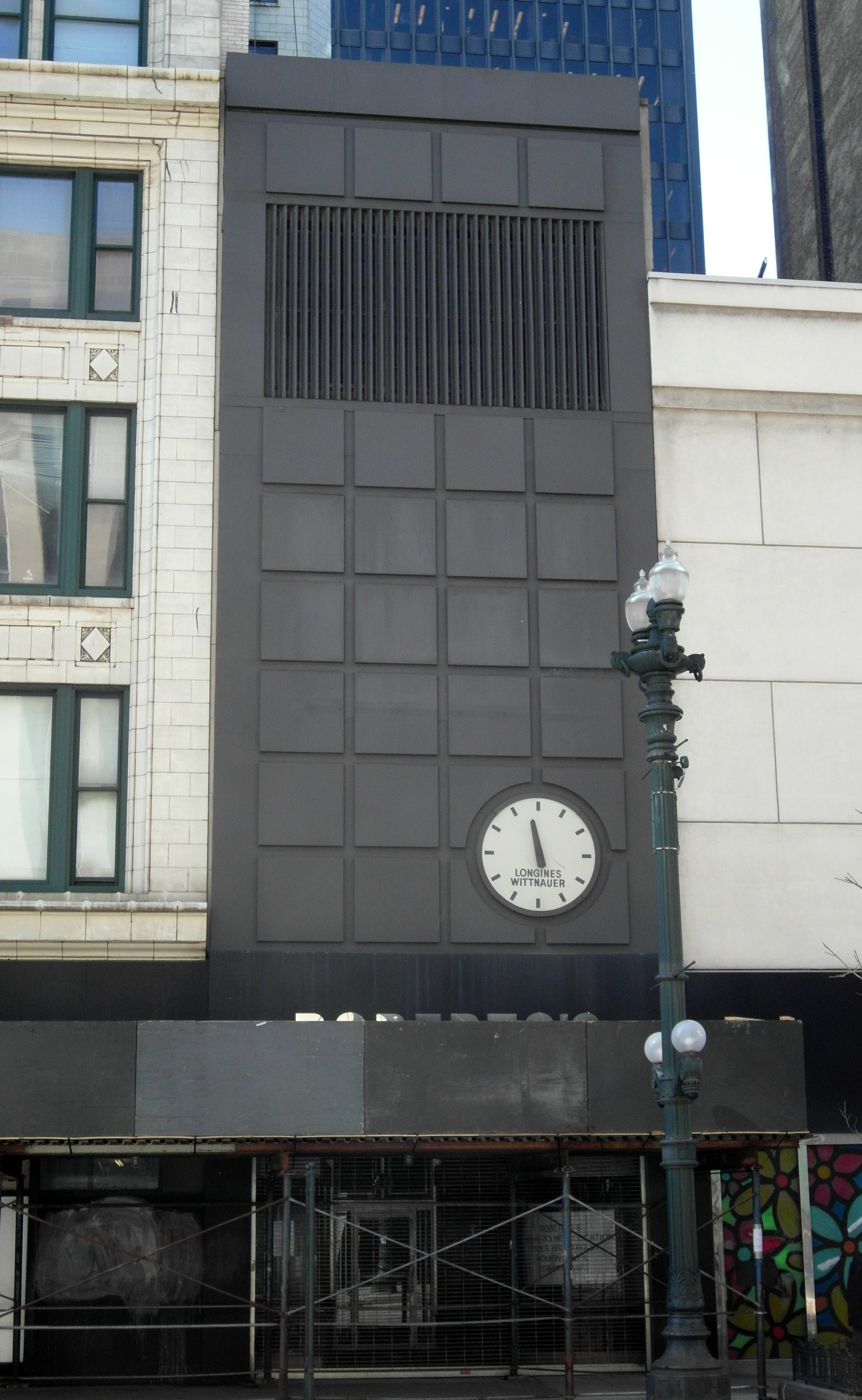

General information
- Location: 214 S. State Street, Chicago, Illinois
- Coordinates: 41°52′44.7″N 87°37′40.6″W
- Completed: 1887

Technical details
- Floor count: 4

Design and construction
- Architect: C. M. Palmer

214 South State Street is a building in Chicago's Loop, which was designed by C. M. Palmer and was built in 1887. The building is owned by the General Services Administration and currently sits vacant.

== History ==
The building was completed in 1887, and served as Charles F. Gunther's candy, pastry, and ice cream factory and salesroom. The building opened May 18, 1887. The building was originally 6 stories and its address was 212 State Street under the pre-1911 Downtown Chicago street numbering system.

In 1909, Gunther retired and sold the building to Jacob L. Kesner. Kesner built the Consumers Building at 220 South State Street in 1913, and had purchased 214 South State Street to ensure a skyscraper would not be built there. After the completion of the Consumers Building, 214 South State Street was known as the Consumers Annex. In 1913, Kesner was issued a building permit for alterations on the six-story building, with Jenney, Mundie & Jensen listed as the architects. By 1923, the building was reported to be four stories.

A. Weis & Company operated the Winter Garden, an upscale restaurant located in the basements of 214 South State Street and the adjacent Consumers Building. Another tenant in this era was the Economy Hat Bleachery. In 1923, Truly Warner began renting first, second, and third floors for a hat shop. The building was also home to a Harmony Cafeteria in the 1920s and 1930s. In 1946, Martin Jewelers began renting the building, replacing the Newart Company, a clothing retailer. Martin Jewelers had the building remodeled and it later with Isadore E. Alexander redesigning the first floor storefront in the Streamline Moderne style. After Martin Jewelers left the building, another jeweler, Busch Jewelers moved from a nearby location on Adams Street to become the occupants. The building was later home to Roberto's, a men's wear shop.

In 2005, the General Services Administration acquired 214 South State Street and neighboring buildings, using eminent domain to seize some of the properties, citing the need for increased security around the Dirksen Federal Building.

In 2017, CA Ventures reached an agreement to purchase 214 South State Street, the Consumers Building, the Century Building, and 212 South State Street, for $10.38 million. The Consumers Building and Century Building would have been converted to apartments, as part of a $141 million redevelopment project, while the historic Streamline Moderne storefront of 214 South State St. would have been restored and incorporated into a 25,000 square-foot structure built between the taller buildings for retail and commercial use. Under the terms of the agreement, the City of Chicago would purchase the buildings from the federal government and then immediately sell them to CA Ventures. However, the City of Chicago backed out of the agreement in December 2019, citing security concerns at the nearby Dirksen Federal Building.
