= Charles F. Gunther =

American confectioner and collector (1837–1920)

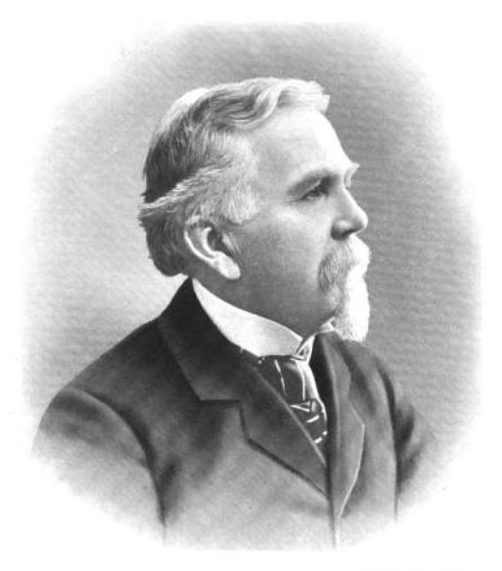

Chicago City Treasurer
- In office 1901–1903
- Preceded by: Adam Ortseifen
- Succeeded by: Ernst Hummel

Chicago Alderman from 2nd ward
- In office 1896–1900 Serving with Martin Best (1896–1897); Patrick J. Cook (1897–1899); Eugene R. Pike (1899–1900)
- Preceded by: Addison Ballard
- Succeeded by: William Hale Thompson

Personal details
- Born: March 6, 1837
- Died: February 10, 1920 (aged 82) Chicago, Illinois, U.S.
- Resting place: Rosehill Cemetery
- Occupation: Confectioner

Charles Frederick Gunther (March 6, 1837 – February 10, 1920) was a wealthy German-American confectioner, politician, and collector. He purchased many of the items now owned by the Chicago History Museum. He served two terms as a Chicago alderman from the city's 2nd ward and one term as Chicago city treasurer.

== Early life ==
Gunther and his family moved from Württemberg, Germany, to Pennsylvania in 1842, then resettled in Peru, Illinois. In 1860, Gunther traveled south and landed a job with Bohlen, Wilson & Company, an ice distributor based in Memphis, Tennessee. When the American Civil War broke out, Gunther pledged to "stick by Memphis", and helped transport Confederate soldiers along the tributaries of the Mississippi River. He was captured by Union troops in 1862, but was released and traveled back to Illinois. During the later years of the war, he worked as a traveling salesman for a Chicago candy manufacturer, mainly selling goods throughout the southern states.

== Candy and collections ==
After the Civil War, Gunther traveled to Europe to learn from the candymakers there. He started his own candy company in Chicago in 1868, specializing in caramel, which he is sometimes credited with introducing to the United States. Gunther's business was destroyed in the 1871 Great Chicago Fire, but he quickly recovered and built a new factory on State Street. With wealthy customers like socialite Bertha Palmer, Gunther amassed a fortune, and began purchasing historical artifacts to display in his factory. Many of these were artifacts from the Civil War, but there were also more unusual items in his collection, such as shrunken heads. Gunther even claimed to own the skin of the serpent from the Garden of Eden and the mummy of Moses' foster mother, Bithiah (both assumed to be fakes). One of Gunther's most important authentic items was Abraham Lincoln's deathbed, which he purchased in 1877.

Gunther's collection continued to grow, and he eventually turned his sights to the Libby Prison, a former Confederate prison in Richmond, Virginia. Gunther purchased the structure and had it dismantled and shipped to Chicago, where it was reassembled and converted into a museum to house Gunther's artifacts. It opened to the public in 1889 and hosted thousands of visitors within its first few months of existence. The infirmary of the prison was converted into the Lincoln Room, in which Gunther displayed Lincoln's deathbed, along with other artifacts associated with Lincoln's assassination. Gunther later tried to purchase an Egyptian pyramid and Independence Hall in Philadelphia so he could bring them to Chicago, but he was unsuccessful.

During the 1890s, Gunther became involved with Chicago's growing convention industry. When the original Chicago Coliseum burned down in 1897, Gunther decided to build a new Coliseum on the site of the Libby Prison, since attendance at the museum was beginning to wane. The prison building was disassembled, and parts of it were donated to the Chicago Historical Society. Gunther offered the rest of his collection to the city, with the hope that the city would build a museum for it in Garfield Park, but Illinois law prevented such a building from being constructed on parkland.

== Political career ==
Gunther served two terms (1896–1900) as a Chicago alderman and one term (1901–1903) as City Treasurer of Chicago. He was briefly a Gold Democrat and supported John McAuley Palmer for president in 1896. In 1908, Gunther sought the (regular) Democratic Party's nomination as an Illinois gubernatorial candidate, but lost to Adlai E. Stevenson I.

== Collection today ==
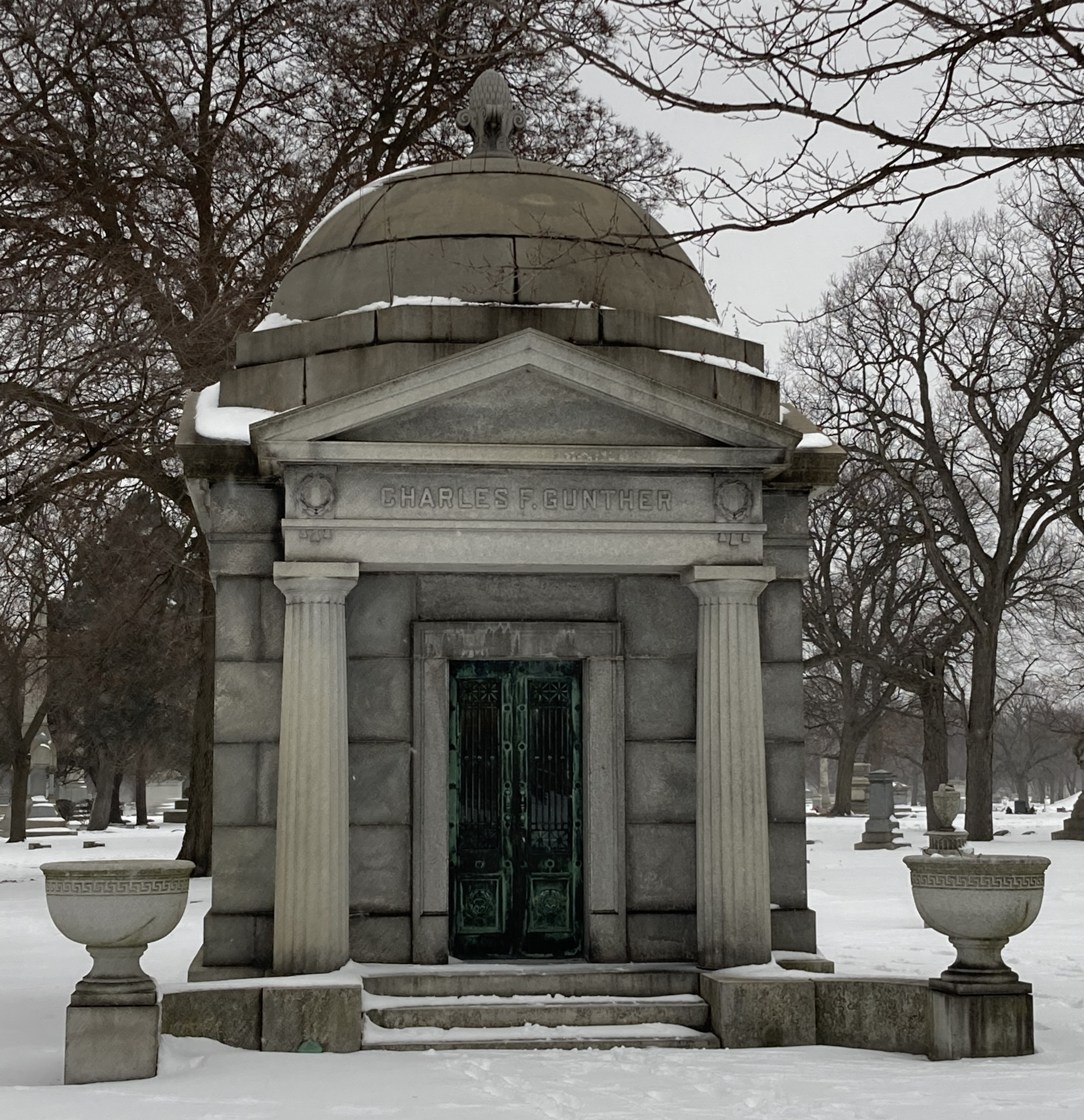
Gunther's mausoleum at Rosehill Cemetery, Chicago

After Gunther's death at his home in Chicago on February 10, 1920, the Chicago Historical Society paid $150,000 for the bulk of Gunther's collection, which by that point also included the table on which Robert E. Lee surrendered at Appomattox Court House. Shortly afterwards, the society began building a $1 million museum to display its expanded collection. The building opened in 1932 at Clark Street and North Avenue, and is currently known as the Chicago History Museum.

One of the smaller objects within the large estate collection turned out to be an alleged "skin of the serpent" from the Garden of Eden, suitably framed. Though the skin may be that of a real anaconda or python, the museum staff assumes it did not come from the Garden of Eden, since the hieroglyphic markings in its frame are merely gibberish.
