= Revere Camera Company =

American movie cameras and projectors (1920–1960)

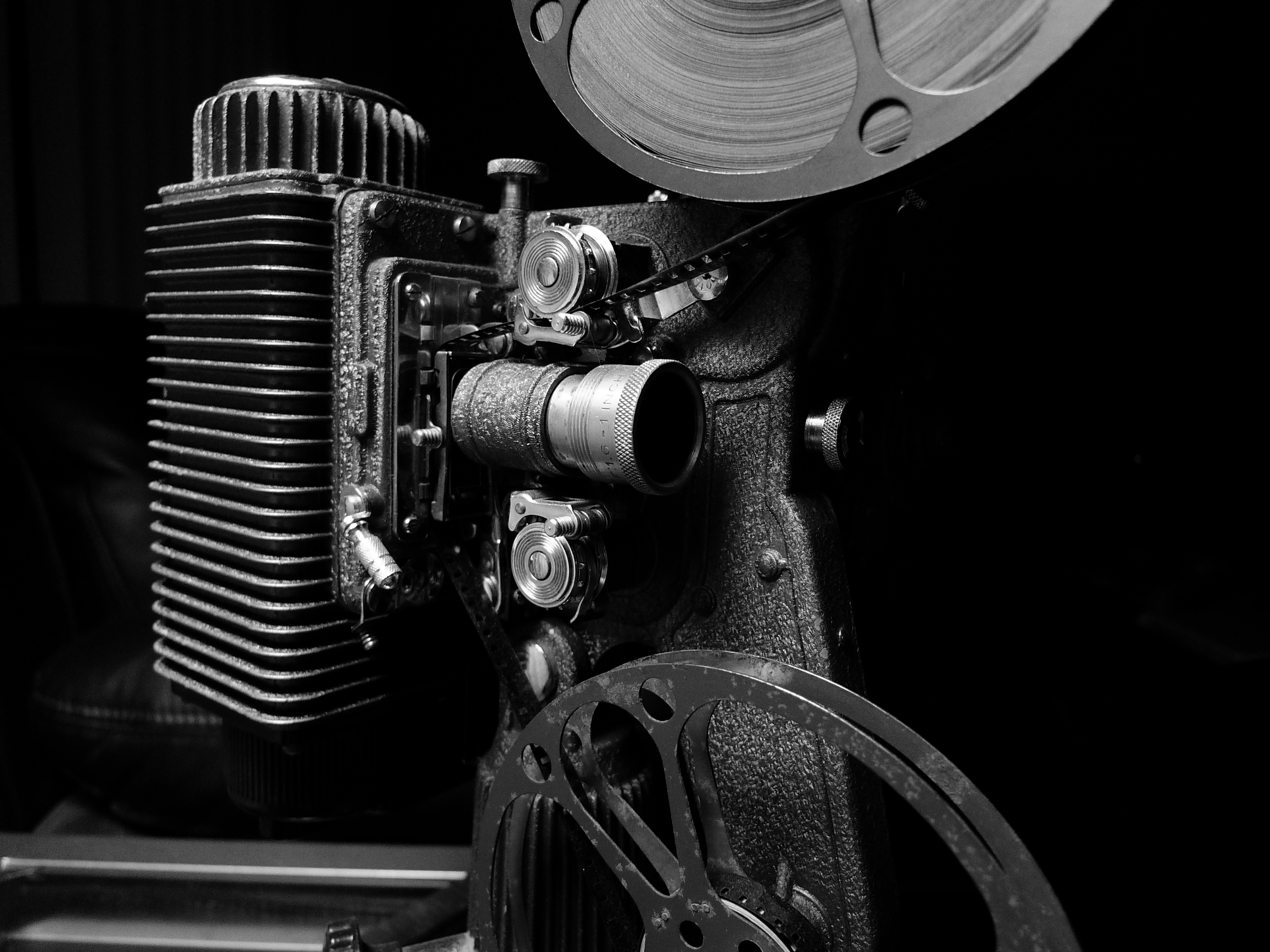
- Revere 8mm projector, circa 1941
- Company type: Private
- Industry: Photography
- Founded: Early 1920s in Chicago, Illinois, U.S.
- Founder: Samuel Briskin
- Defunct: 1960
- Fate: Acquired by 3M
- Headquarters: Chicago, Illinois, U.S.
- Products: Movie cameras, projectors

The Revere Camera Company was started in 1920 by Samuel Briskin, who also started Wollensak Recorders and Opticals.

== History ==
The Revere Camera Company was founded in the early 1920s in Chicago, Illinois, as the Excel Auto Radiator Company by Ukrainian immigrant Samuel Briskin. Built for Excel – and designed by Alfred S. Alschuler, the manufacturing facility was located at 320 E. 21st St., Chicago, Illinois. They started making budget 8 mm movie cameras in 1939 through a subsidiary run by Briskin's sons, such as the Revere 88 Movie Camera and the Revere 85 8mm Projector. That company was later merged into Excel Auto Radiator Co., which then changed its name to Revere Camera Co. The Revere name is taken from the Revere Copper Company.

In November 1952, Revere purchased the nearby Atwell Building – also designed by Alfred S. Alschuler – at 221 E. Cullerton St., Chicago, Illinois – and operated machinery on four of the building's eight floors. In the 1950s, the company was the second largest manufacturer of small movie cameras in the United States. In order to grow that business further the company took over their primary lens and shutter supplier, New Jersey-based Wollensak Optical Co. The Revere brand name had become synonymous with budget cameras; soon after the take-over, Wollensak models appeared that were almost identical mechanically to the standard Revere models but had better lenses, more stylish casing, and sold for a premium price.

Revere started manufacturing tape recorders in the early 1950s. That side of the business never became an important part of the company's output.

Revere, starting probably in the 1950s, produced a rotary grinding hand tool similar to the Dremel Moto-tool. The Revere-O-Matic was a 0.55 ampere model that operated at 15,000 r.p.m. (Model No. RG-1). The tools that attached to its collet are compatible with the Dremel tool. The standard product included a table mount and a system for duplicating objects, adaptable to the Dremel without modification.

Samuel Briskin was diagnosed with inoperable cancer in 1960 and sold the company to 3M for $17 million (equivalent to $181 million in 2024).
