= Wollensak =

American audio-visual products manufacturer (1899–1972)

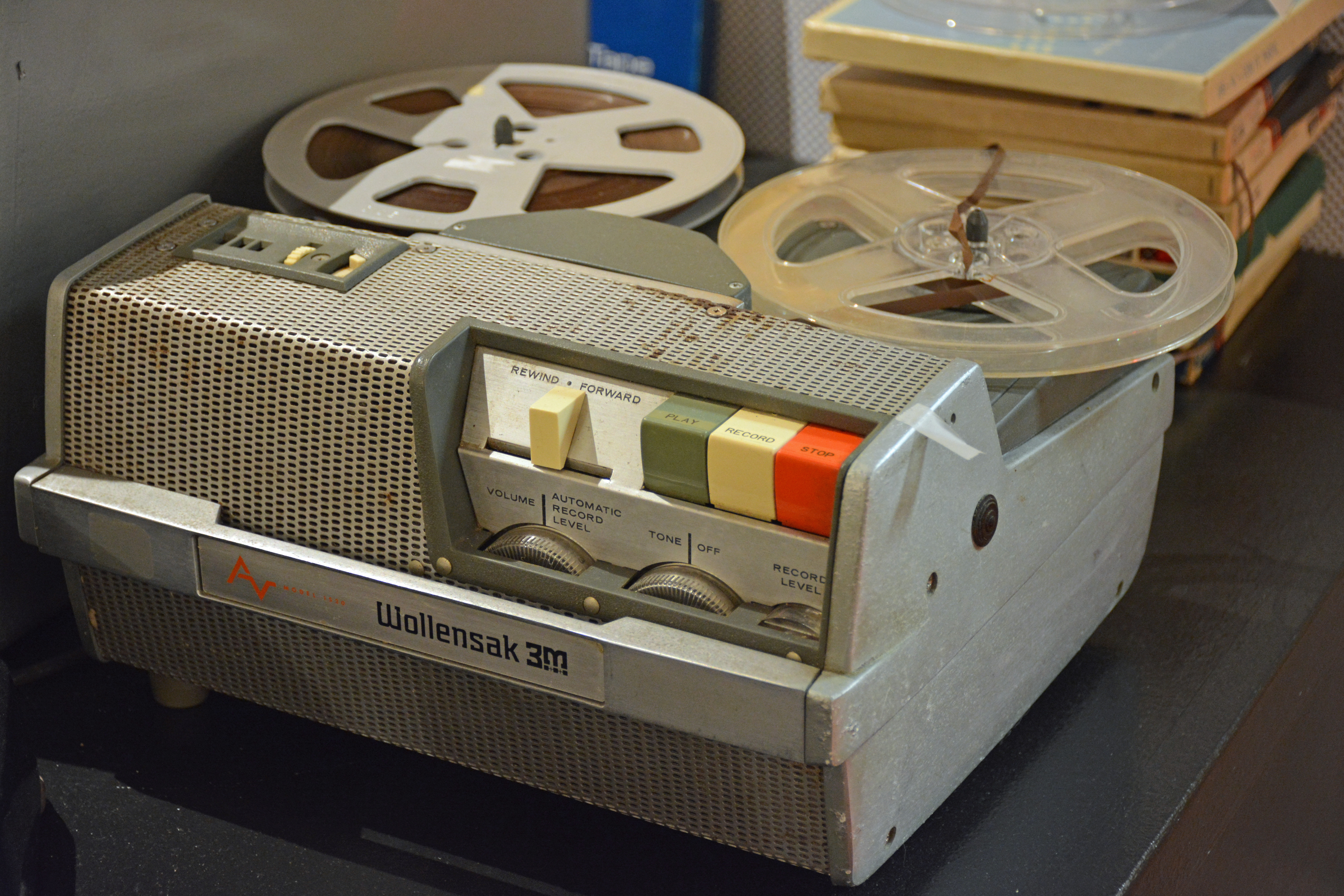
Wollensak portable reel-to-reel tape recorder

Wollensak Optical was an American manufacturer of audio-visual products located in Rochester, New York. At the height of their popularity in the 1950s and 1960s, many brands of movie cameras came with a Wollensak Velostigmat lens. Wollensak reel-to-reel tape recorders were known for their construction, reliability, and value. Wollensak tape recorders were used for amateur home, school, and office recording. They were produced in both stereo and mono designs.

The company was founded in the 1890s by Andrew and John C. Wollensak to produce camera shutters and lenses. At its peak in the 1950s, it employed over 1000 people. The company had several owners, including Revere Camera Company and 3M Company. Wollensak ceased operation in 1972.

== Camera equipment ==
Wollensak began making camera lenses in 1902. The company also produced camera shutters for large format cameras. They made shutters such as the Betax, Alphax, Optimo and, for the Graflex Corporation, Rapax.

The Betax shutters were patented in 1912 and remain popular for large format photographers. Betax shutters are made in sizes from #0 to the huge size #5. These shutters are very reliable and relatively easy to repair.

Wollensak purchased the Fastax high speed rotating-prism camera developed by Bell Labs from Western Electric, and improved it to a rate of 10,000 frames/second. Fastax cameras were used for recording projectiles and explosions, including nuclear explosions. The cameras, with the rotating prism removed, were used for "streak" and "smear" photography.

Wollensak made only one still camera model, the "Stereo 10" 35 mm 3D camera.

They formed a partnership with the Revere Camera Company that led to their offering some movie cameras (mostly 8 mm) under their name in the 1950s and early 1960s.

== Audio-visual ==
3M also used the Wollensak brand name on audio tape recorders for many years; the Wollensak recorders were solidly built with all-metal construction. They were among the first manufacturers of cassette decks, as well as 8-track decks for home use.
