= Rose Haas Alschuler =

American educator (1887–1979)

Rose Haas Alschuler (December 17, 1887 – July 4, 1979) was an American educator. She worked with the Chicago Woman's Club to create and direct the first nursery school in Chicago. That school, organized in the Franklin Public School system was also the second nursery school created in the United States. Alschuler continued to support and promote early childhood education throughout her life. She later became a fund-raiser for the new State of Israel.

== Biography ==
Rose Haas was born and raised in Chicago. Her grandfather, Michael Greenebaum, was a Jewish community leader. Alschuler attended the University of Chicago from 1904 to 1905, then went to Vassar College for a year before she returned again to the University of Chicago, finishing in 1907. That same year, she married architect, Alfred Alschuler and together they had five children. In 1915, the family moved to Winnetka.

Alschuler, along with her cousin, Charlotte Kuh, started the first nursery school in Chicago, the Children's Community School, in 1922. In 1926, she and Carleton W. Washburne founded the Winnetka Public School Nursery. In 1928, she helped create nursery schools for the tenants of the Garden Apartments. She helped set up 18 different Works Progress Administration (WPA) nurseries between 1933 and 1940. When the International Congress of Women was held in 1933 in Chicago, she was the chair for the Opportunity Through Education Round Table.

On June 11, 1940, her husband died. Alschuler moved to Washington, D.C. From 1941 to 1943, she was the chair of the National Commission for Young Children. In that capacity, she provided information about early childhood education for providers around the country. She worked as a consultant for the Federal Housing Authority. When WWII was over, Alschuler traveled to Israel and helped raise money for Israel Bonds.

== Selected publications ==
- Play: The Child's Response to Life. with Christine M. Heinig. New York: Houghton Mifflin Co. 1936. OCLC 1805050.
- Children's Centers: A Guide for Those Who Care for and About Young Children. with National Commission for Young Children. New York: Morrow. 1942. OCLC 14733210.
- Painting and Personality: A Study of Young Children. with La Berta Weiss Hattwick. Chicago: University of Chicago Press. 1947. OCLC 833703657.
