= Richard Churchill House =

Historic house in Illinois, United States

- U.S. National Register of Historic Places
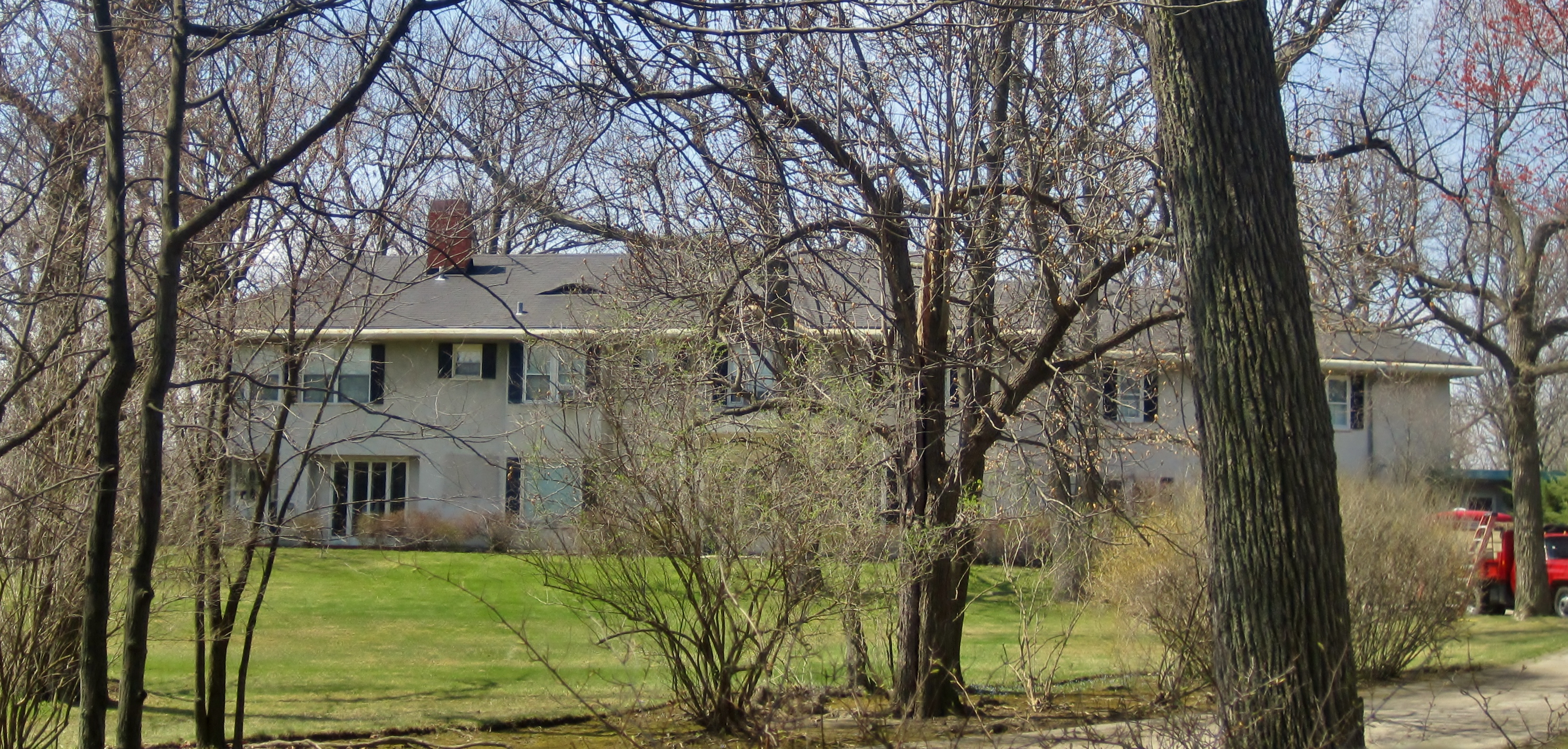

- Location within Chicago metropolitan area Location within Illinois Location within the United States
- Location: 1214 Green Bay Rd., Highland Park, Illinois
- Coordinates: 42°10′28″N 87°47′49″W
- Area: 4 acres (1.6 ha)
- Built: 1908
- Architect: Alfred S. Alschuler
- Architectural style: English Country House
- MPS: Highland Park MRA
- NRHP reference No.: 82002557
- Added to NRHP: September 29, 1982

The Richard Churchill House is a historic house at 1214 Green Bay Road in Highland Park, Illinois. The house was built in 1908 for the Churchill family, which used the last name Kirschberger at the time but later changed it due to anti-German sentiment during World War I. Architect Alfred S. Alschuler, who was also known for his work on skyscrapers and industrial buildings in Chicago, designed the house. The house has an English country house design, a popular choice for early twentieth-century suburbanites building on large plots. The two-story house has a stucco exterior, an entrance flanked by columns and latticework, and a Palladian window above the entrance.

The house was added to the National Register of Historic Places on September 29, 1982.
