= Marshall Field and Company Store (Oak Park, Illinois) =

- U.S. National Register of Historic Places
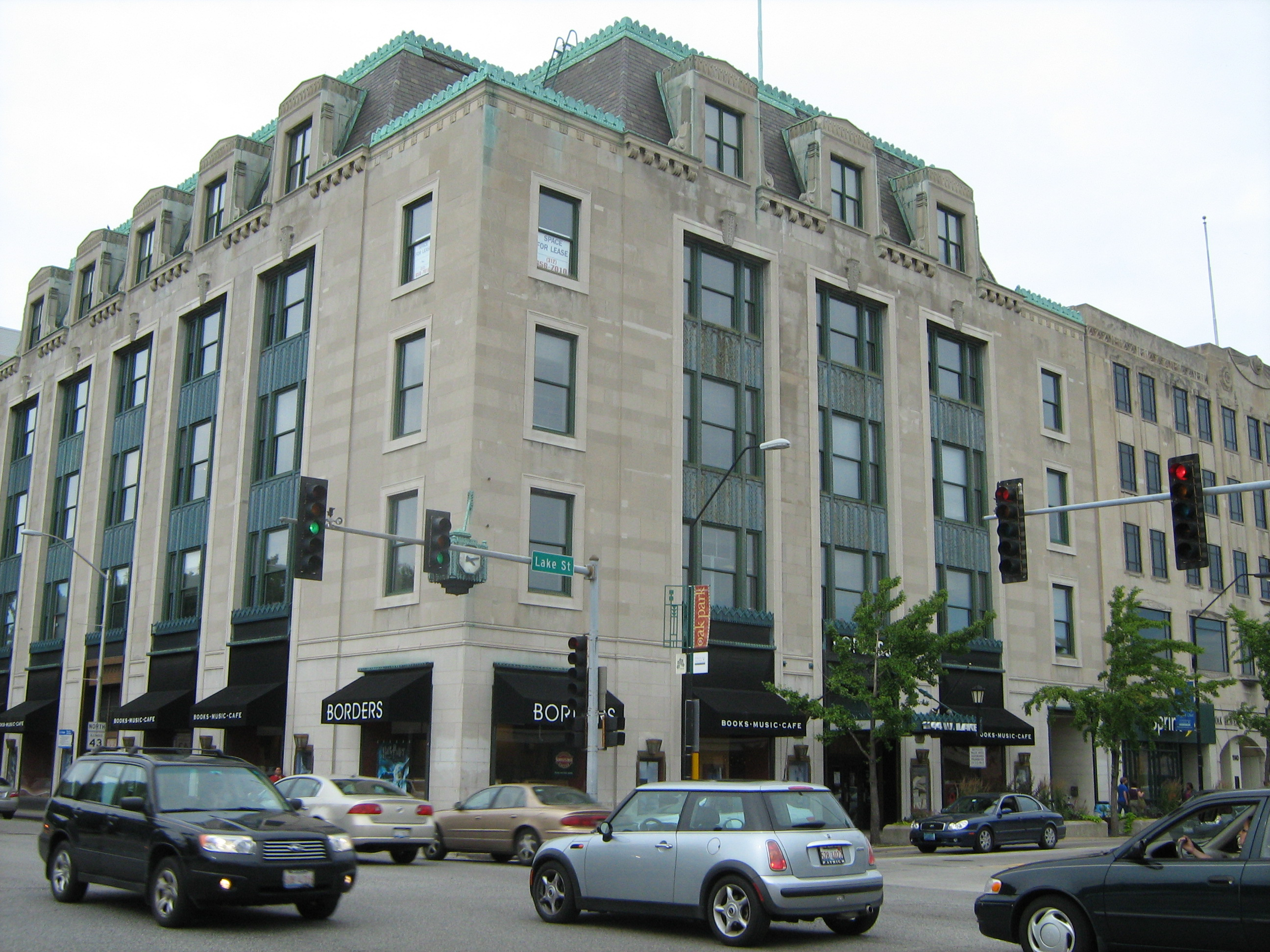

- Location within Illinois Location within the United States
- Location: 1144 W. Lake St. Oak Park, Illinois; United States
- Coordinates: 41°53′21.32″N 87°48′16.02″W
- Built: 1928
- Architects: Graham, Anderson, Probst & White
- Architectural style: Art Deco
- NRHP reference No.: 87002510 (original); 100011693 (increase)

Significant dates
- Added to NRHP: January 21, 1988
- Boundary increase: April 9, 2025

Marshall Field and Company Store is a building in Oak Park, Illinois that was added to the National Register of Historic Places on January 21, 1988. It is one of the two locations (along with the Evanston location) that the company chose to expand to when it decided to add suburban stores. The store is a miniature replica of the Marshall Field and Company Building in the Chicago Loop and a twin of the Evanston store.

The building served as a Marshall Field's store from its opening until 1986, when Marshall Field's then-owner BATUS Inc. closed it because it was deemed out of date and too costly to operate. The building housed a Borders, until the chain closed in 2011. Today, it houses several offices with a Barnes and Noble store where the former Borders was grand opening on July 1, 2026.
