= Marshall Field and Company Building =

Store building in Chicago, Illinois

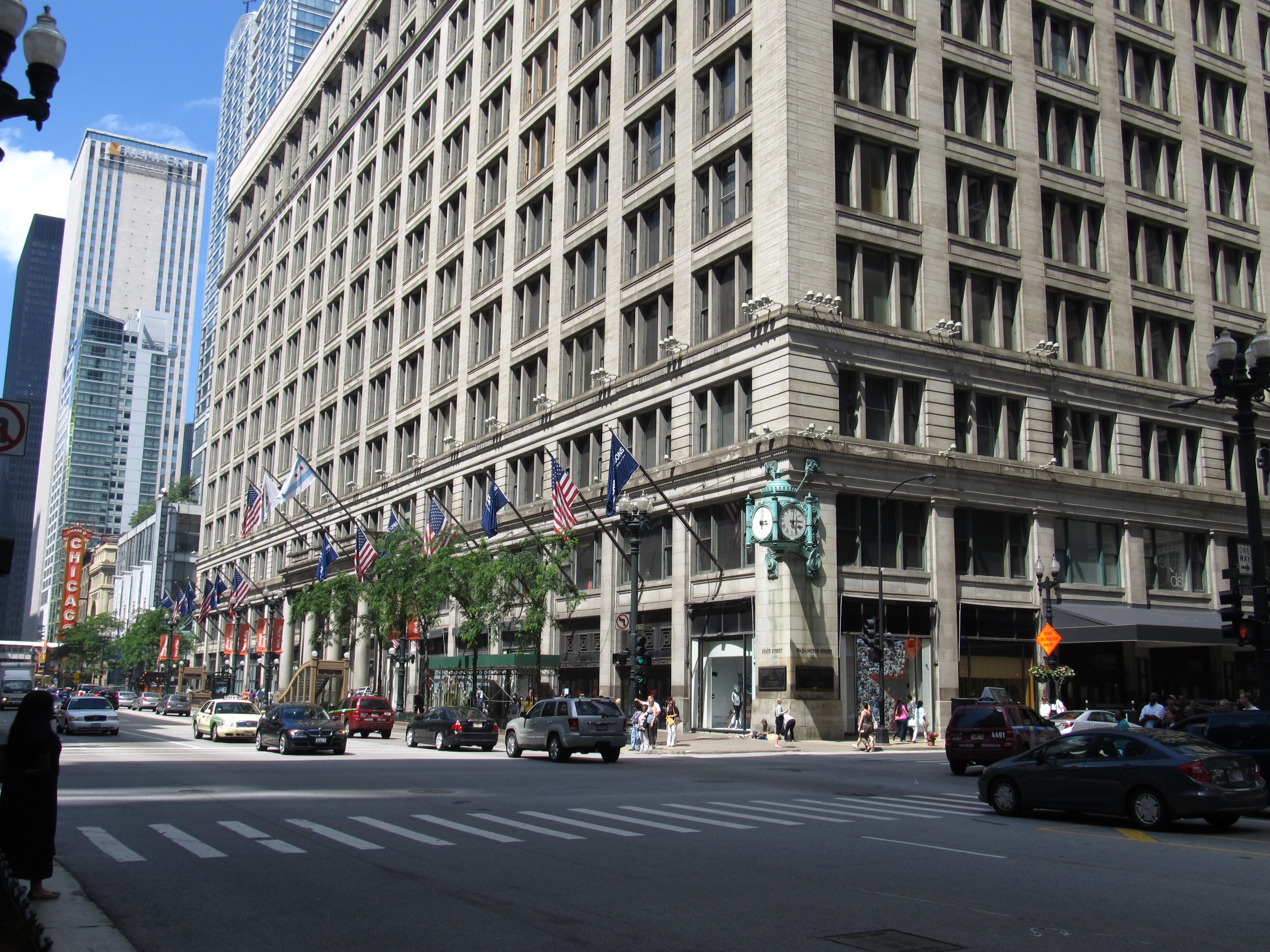
- Exterior of the Marshall Field and Company Building (2013)
- Alternative names: Macy's State Street

General information
- Status: Open
- Type: Department store
- Architectural style: Beaux-Arts and Commercial style
- Location: 111 North State Street, Chicago, Illinois, United States
- Coordinates: 41°53′1.31″N 87°37′37.09″W
- Current tenants: Macy's
- Opened: 1902
- Client: Marshall Field
- Owner: Macy's, Inc. (floors 1–7); Brookfield Corporation (floors 8–14)

Technical details
- Floor count: 14

Design and construction
- Architect: Daniel Burnham
- Marshall Field and Company Building
- U.S. National Register of Historic Places
- U.S. National Historic Landmark
- Chicago Landmark
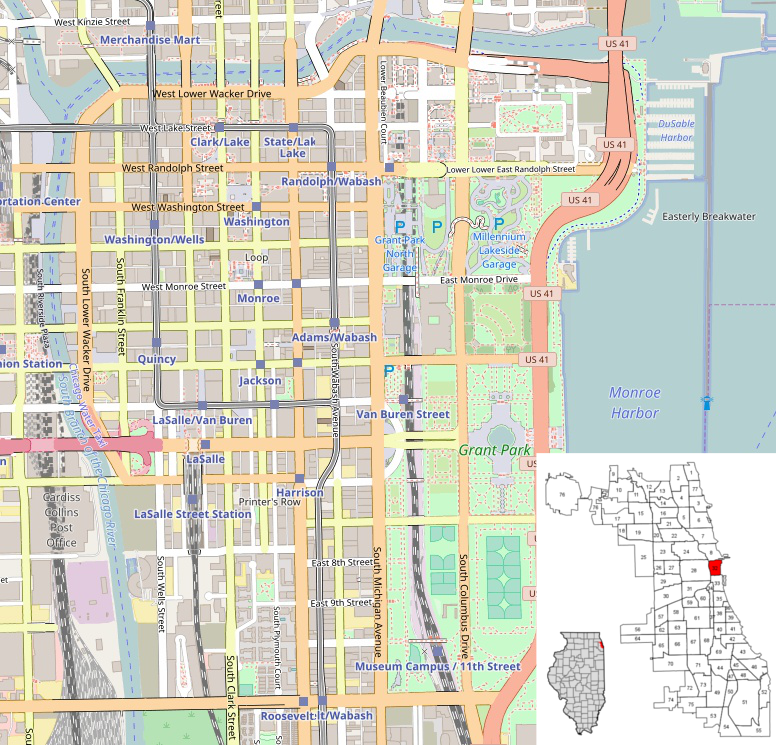
- Location within Chicago Loop Location within Chicago Location within Greater Chicago Location within Illinois Location within the United States
- NRHP reference No.: 78001123

Significant dates
- Added to NRHP: June 2, 1978
- Designated NHL: June 2, 1978
- Designated CHICL: November 1, 2005

The Marshall Field and Company Building is a department store building and National Historic Landmark on State Street in Chicago, Illinois, United States. Located in the Chicago Loop, it was designed in the Beaux-Arts and Commercial style by Daniel Burnham for Marshall Field. The building takes up the entire city block bounded clockwise from the west by State Street, Randolph Street, Wabash Avenue, and Washington Street; the north end (including the columned entrance) was built in 1901–1902, and the south end in 1905–1906. It was the flagship store of the Marshall Field's department store chain until The May Department Stores Company was acquired by Federated Department Stores and converted the store to Macy's in 2006, and remains the Midwest Macy's flagship store.

Field and partners founded their Chicago store in 1852, and first built an expansive shopping emporium on this site in 1868. The 1901 building was the fourth for the department store at this site. Marshall Field's established numerous important business "firsts" in this building and in the series of previous elaborate decorative structures on this site for the last century and a half, and it is regarded as one of the three most influential establishments in the nationwide development of the department store and in the commercial business economic history of the United States. The name of the stores formerly headquartered at this building changed on September 9, 2006, as a result of the merger that produced Macy's, Inc. and led to the integration of the Marshall Field's stores into the Macy's now-nationwide retailing network.

The building, which is the third largest store in the world, was both declared a National Historic Landmark and listed on the National Register of Historic Places on June 2, 1978, and it was designated a Chicago Landmark on November 1, 2005. The building architecture is known for its multiple atria (several balconied atrium - "Great Hall") and for having been built in stages over the course of more than two decades. Its ornamentation includes a mosaic vaulted ceiling designed by Louis Comfort Tiffany and a pair of well-known outdoor street-corner clocks at State and Washington, and later at State and Randolph Streets, which serve as symbols of the store since 1897.

== Business history ==
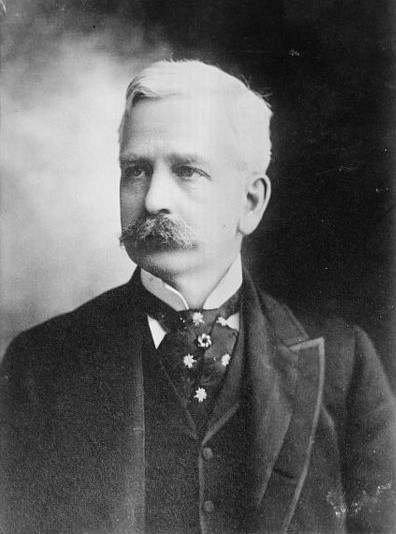
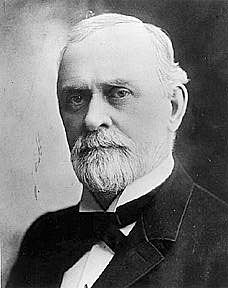
Marshall Field (left) and Potter Palmer (right) were instrumental in the Marshall Field's move to anchor the future "Loop" Retail Historic District at State Street and Washington Street.

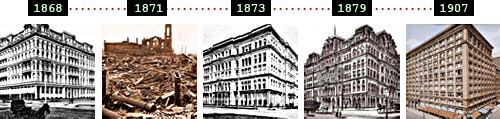
Sequence of store fronts at North State & Washington Streets corner, broken by the aftermath of the 1871 Great Chicago Fire

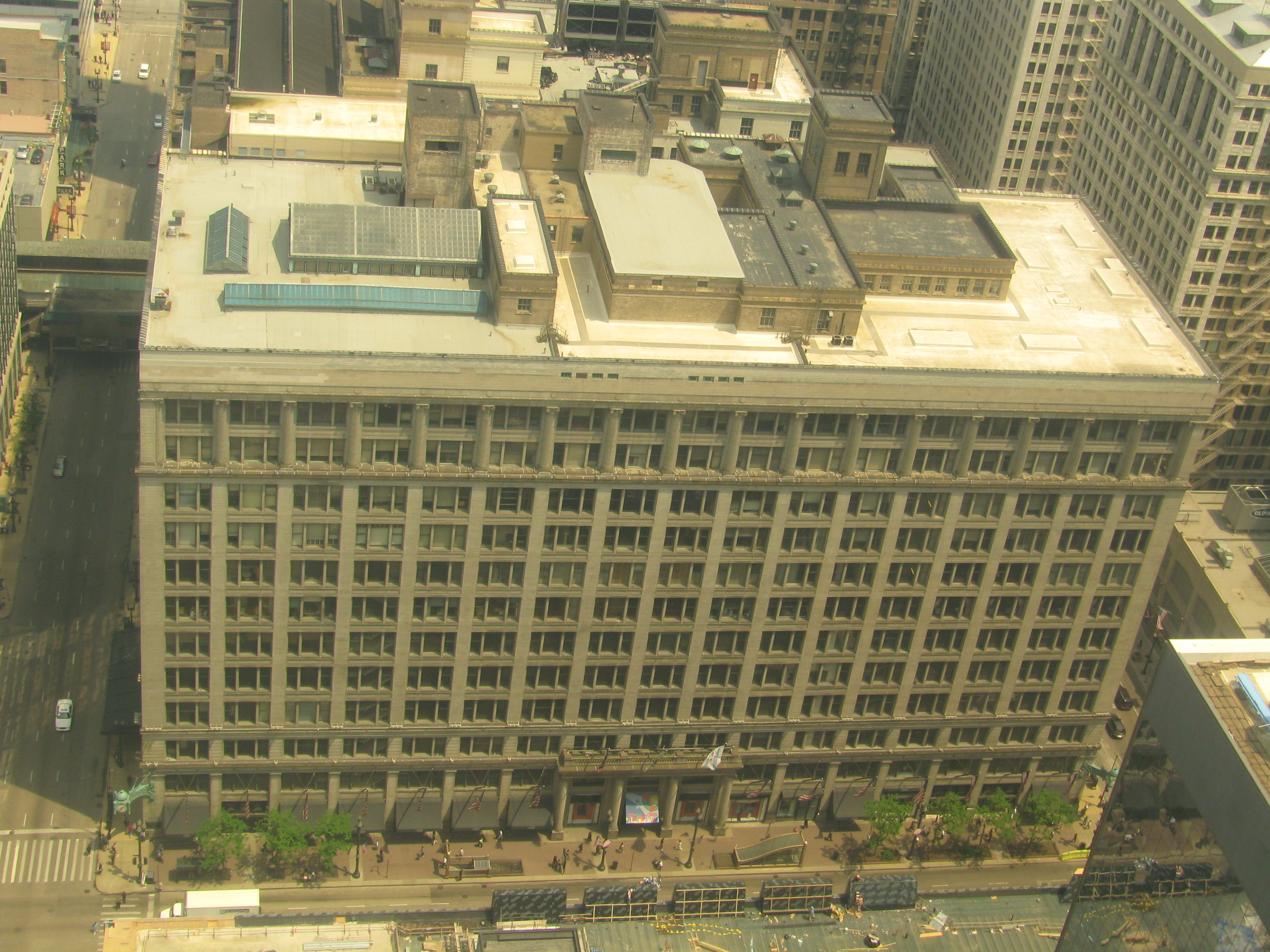
Overhead view of the Marshall Field and Company Building (2008)

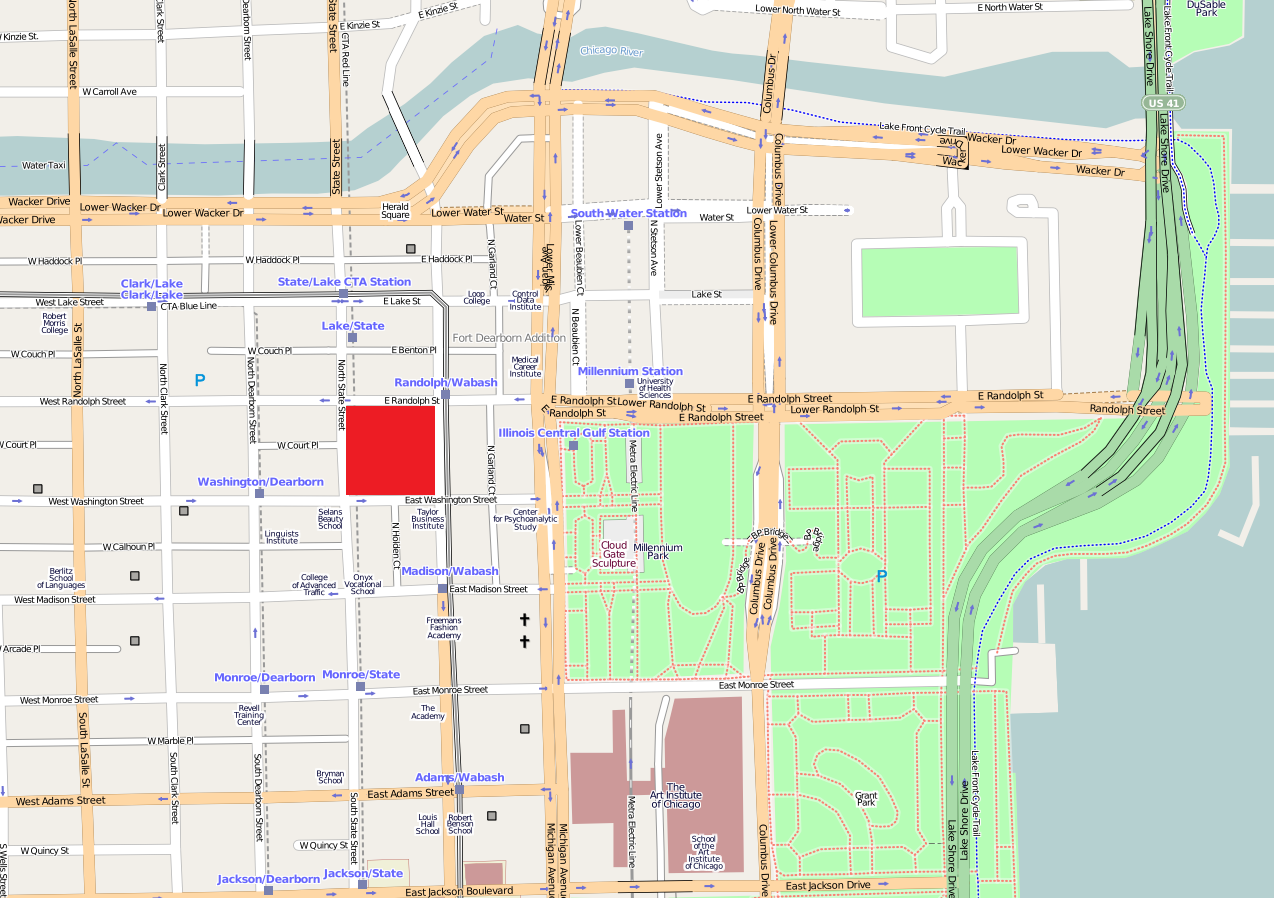
Marshall Field and Company Building location (red square) in Chicago's "Loop" downtown business district area

Although the official corporate name of the retail entity based in this building had been Marshall Field & Company (nicknamed Marshall Field's) from 1881 until 2006, the store has had five different names since its inception in 1852 as P. Palmer & Co. In 1868, after bowing out of involvement in day-to-day operations with his new partners of Field, Palmer & Leiter, Potter Palmer convinced Marshall Field and Levi Leiter to move the Field, Leiter & Co. store to a building Palmer owned on State Street at the corner of Washington Street. After being consumed by the "Great Chicago Fire" and splitting the wholesale business from the retail operations, the store resumed operations at State and Washington in a rebuilt structure, now leased from the Singer Sewing Machine Company. In 1877 another fire consumed this building, and when a new Singer Building was built to replace it at the same location in 1879, Field then put together the financing to purchase it. The business has remained there ever since, and it has added four subsequent buildings to form the integrated structure that is now called the "Marshall Field and Company Building."

Chicago's retailing center was State Street in the famous downtown "Loop" after the "Great Chicago Fire" of 1871, and this center has been anchored by Marshall Field's and its predecessor companies in this building complex. However, commuter suburbs began to have significant retail districts by the 1920s. In the 1920s, the store created new suburban locations such as their Oak Park store to remain competitive. After 1950, with the booming post-World War II economic/social climate with increasing suburban residential and commercial development, saw the construction of first "strip" shopping centers, followed by regional enclosed shopping malls along major thoroughfares and interstate highways such as the "Magnificent Mile" reduced the role of the "Loop"'s daily significance to many Chicagoans as downtown retail sales slipped and gradually additional business moved outward following first the streetcar lines and then the automobile. Eventually, there was an influx of stores from other parts of the country as the pace of commercial retailing merged, consolidating, and spreading first regionally then nationwide.

With the merger and conversion to Macy's in 2006, the emphasis of the store changed and store-branded lines replaced many designer labels, such as Dolce & Gabbana, Prada, Miu Miu and Jimmy Choo, which led to the disassembly of several designer departments of the former Field's. On September 9, 2006, the name of the building was officially changed to "Macy's at State Street". The sentimental objections to the conversion that both eliminated the existence of the corporate entity bearing his name and renaming the building bearing his name were widely reported in the national media of newspapers, radio and television.

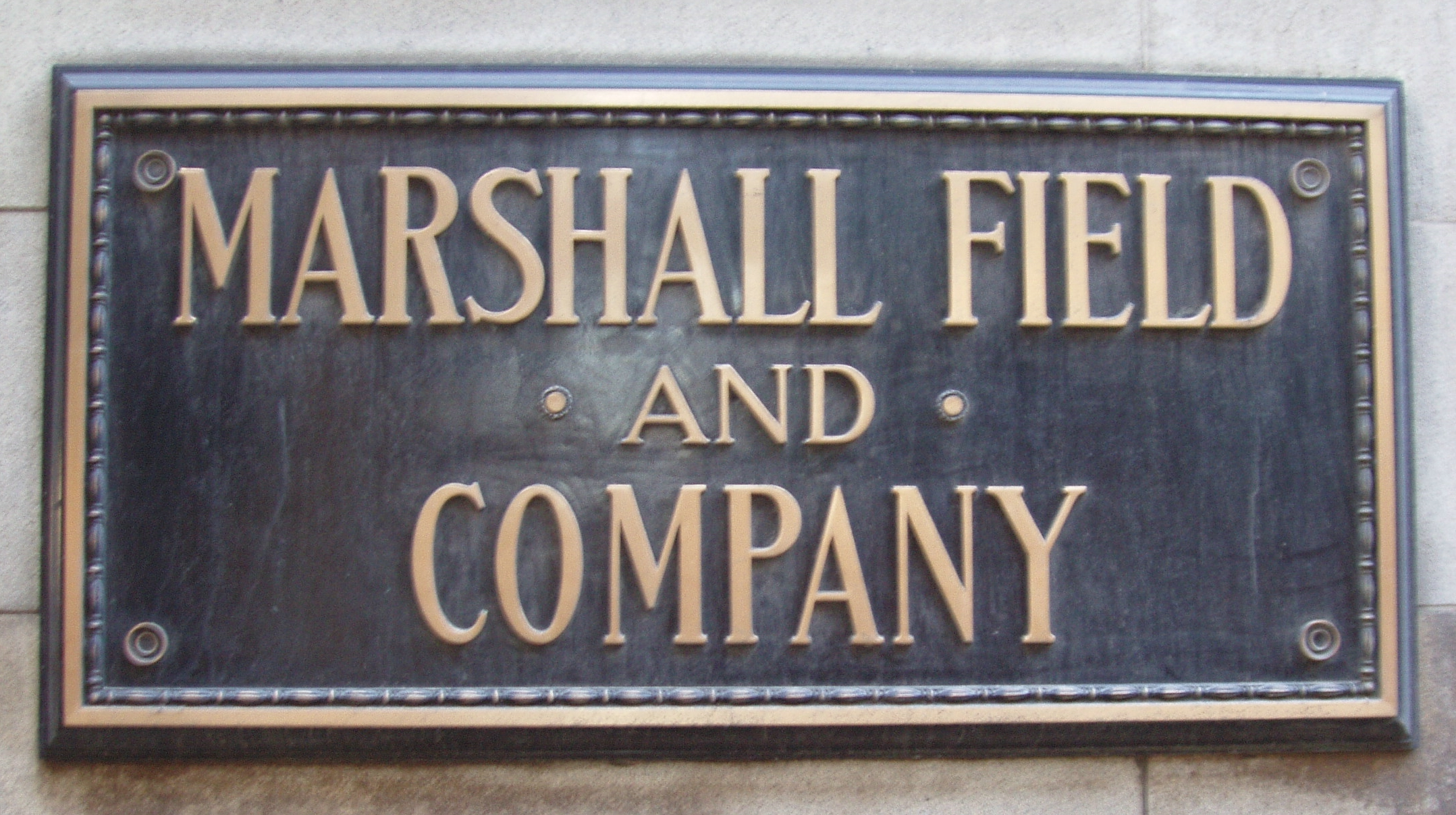
A remaining Marshall Field's building nameplate (2006)

=== Business legend ===
The store housed a business that established new retailing standards and broke many retailing conventions of the day. The company quickly became successful, and by the 1880s it was one of the three largest retailers in the country. Before Marshall Field's death in 1906, his company became the largest wholesale and retail dry goods enterprise in the world. The Marshall Field & Company offered the first bridal registry, provided the first in-store dining facilities and established the first European buying office. The former store also was the first to provide personal shopping assistants. In the early 1900s, annual sales topped $60 million, and buying branches were located in New York City, London, Paris, Tokyo, Stockholm and Berlin.

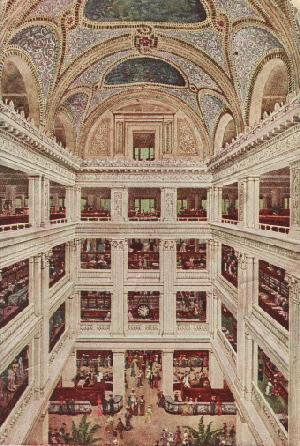
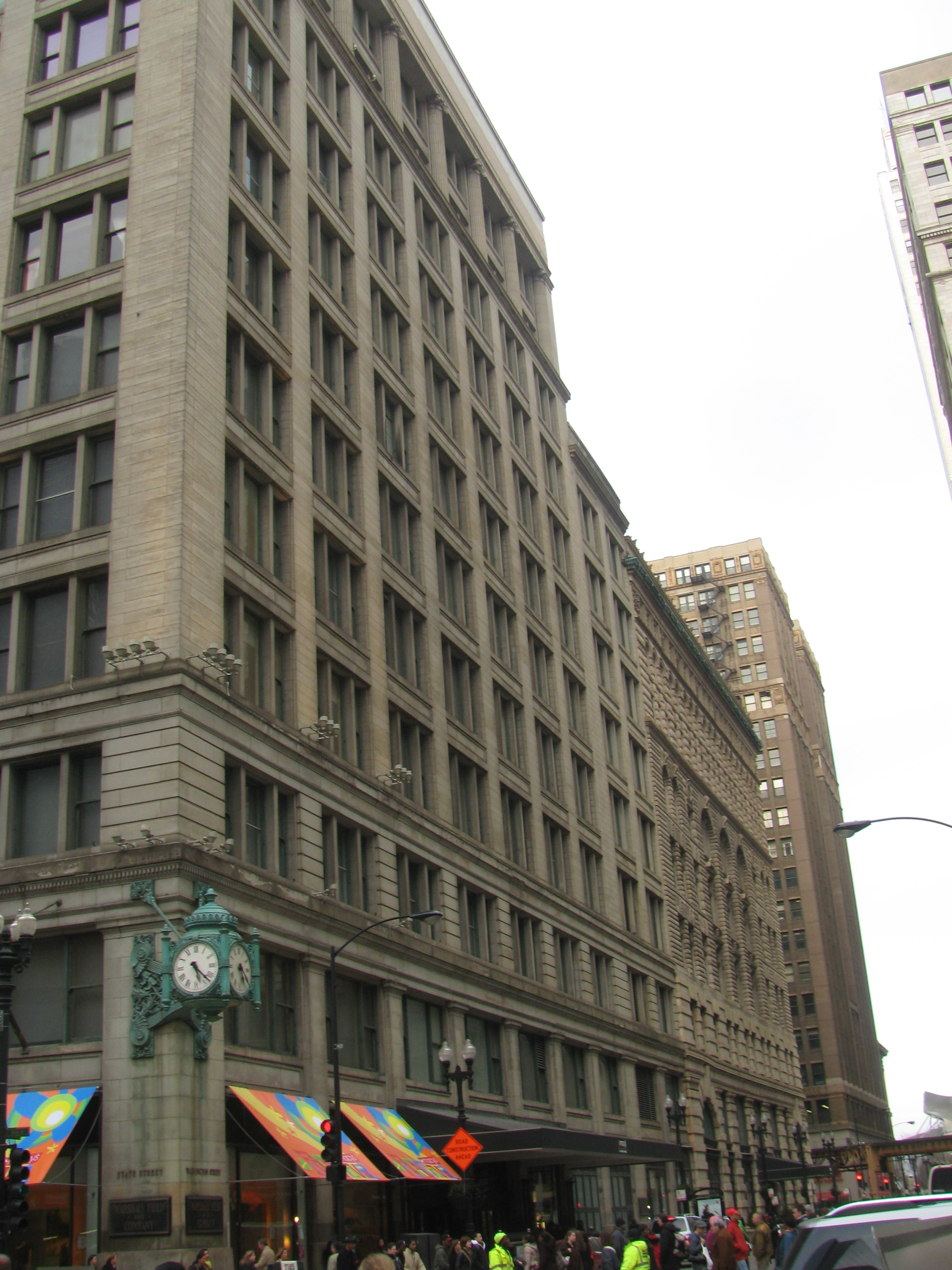
The building has three atria including the 5-story balconied Louis Comfort Tiffany, (1848-1933), (later Tiffany & Co.) mosaic-capped vaulted ceiling one (left, 1910) in the southwest corner. On the right notice the construction stages/years evidenced by slight exterior facade differences.

The building continues to be the second largest store in the world. Marshall Field took over the operations of the store in 1881 and became the first merchant to post the price of the goods in plain sight, which eliminated the common practice of haggling and charging whatever the buyer would pay. On top of that, Field stood behind his product with his famous slogan that symbolized his willingness to refund the full price of all merchandise (a policy inherited from early mentor and partner Potter Palmer) purchased in his store:

Give the lady what she wants.

== Building details ==
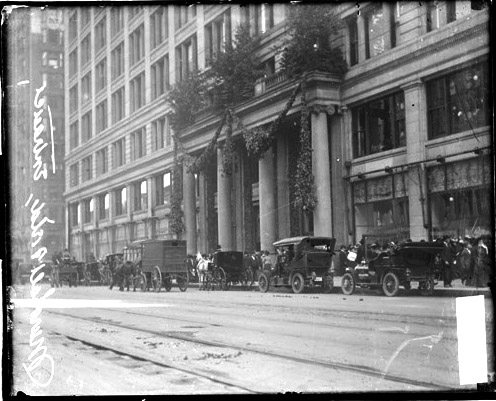
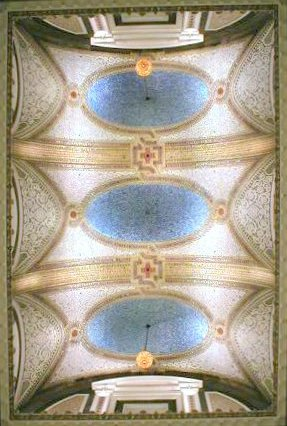
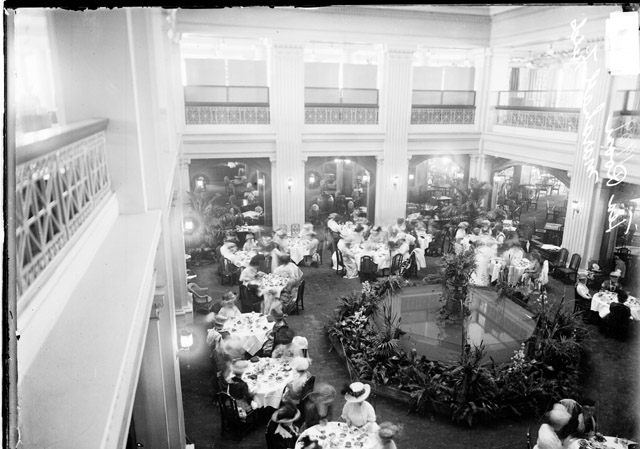
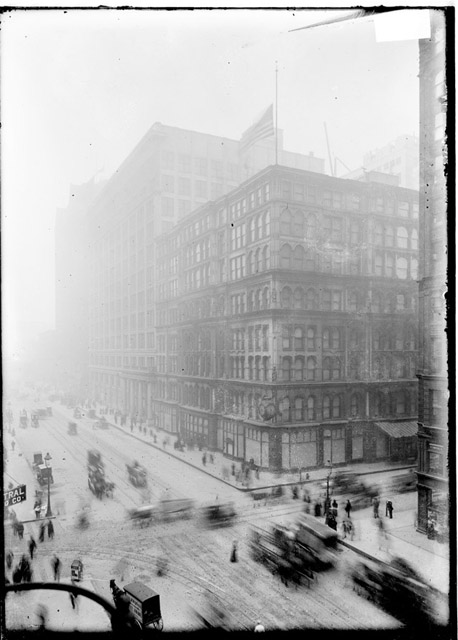
From left to right: Entrance with Holiday decorations and automobiles parked along State Street, c.1910s • Louis Comfort Tiffany, (1848–1933), (later Tiffany & Co. studios of New York City) glass mosaic vaulted ceiling of Marshall Field & Company Building • Marshall Field & Company Building famous two-level balconied Tea Room restaurant • Marshall Field & Company Building view, 1905

The 13-story granite building on State Street was constructed in stages between 1902 and 1906 on a partitioned block with sections that were added to the building in 1902, 1906, 1907, and 1914. Daniel H. Burnham, (1846–1912), designed the two primary sections along State Street (the north building built in 1902 and the south in 1905–06). For a time, the building was the largest store in the world at 73 acres (300,000 m^{2}) of floorspace, with the largest book, china, shoe, and toy departments of all the world's department stores.

The current building has several atria: A Louis Comfort Tiffany mosaic vaulted ceiling dome caps a 5-story balconied atrium in the southwest corner; the northwest section has a 13-story skylit atrium, and a newer atrium with a fountain in the center is bridged by double escalator banks. Crafted by a group of 50 artisans over 18 months, the Tiffany ceiling is over 6,000 square feet (560 m^{2}) and made up of 1.6 million pieces of iridescent glass. It is the first iridescent glass dome and it continues to be the largest glass mosaic of its kind. Only Egypt's 3,000-year-old Temple of Karnak, with its 70-foot (21 m) columns rivals the four 50-foot (15 m) Ionic-style capped granite columns on the State Street façade. The building is estimated to be 150.68 feet (45.93 m) high.

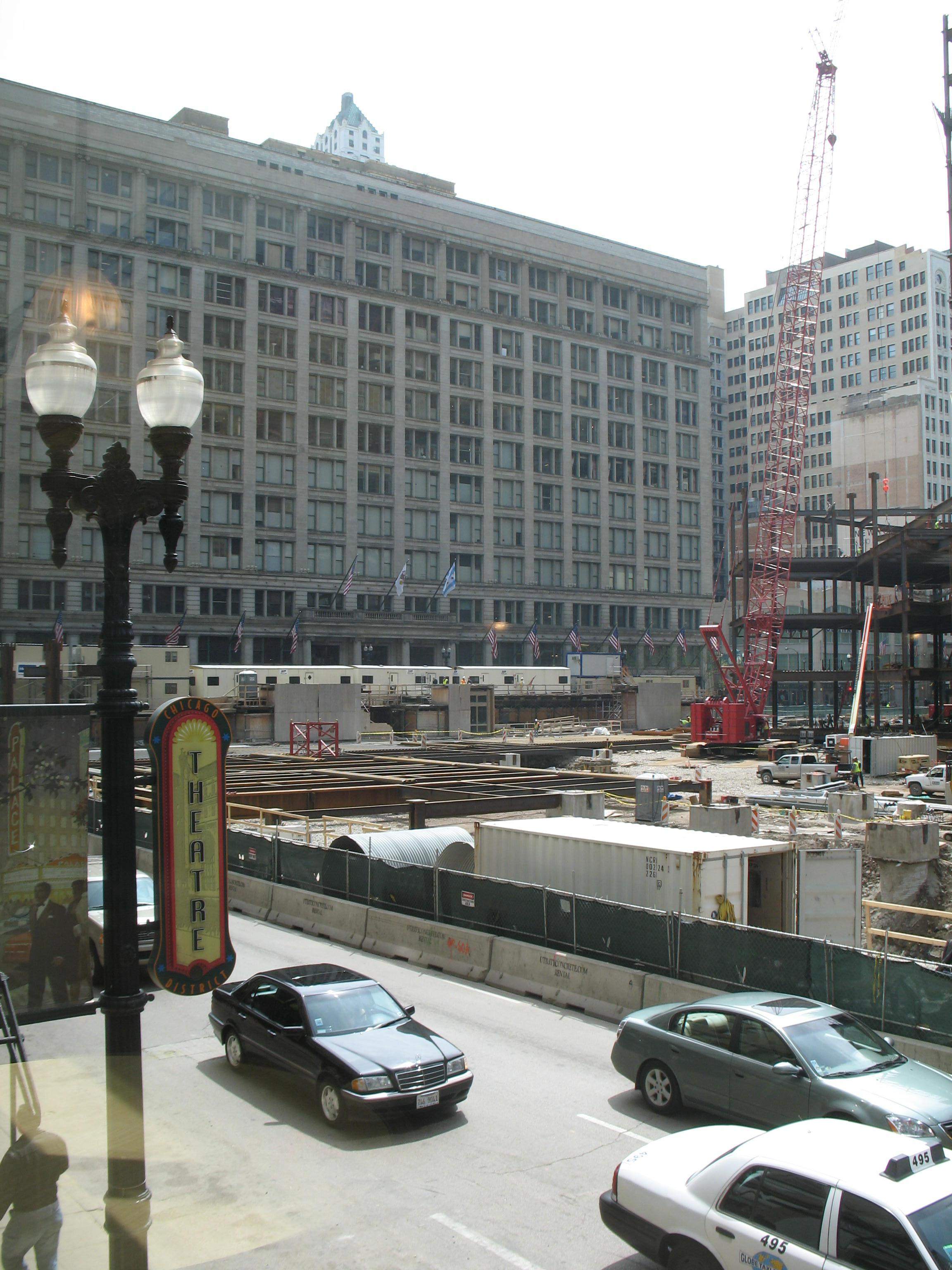
Marshall Field and Company Buildings front facade on North State Street, pictured behind adjacent "Block 37" construction project underway across State Street.

The building is known for its two exterior clocks, which weigh about 7.5 short tons (6.7 long tons) each, on its northwest and southwest corners along State Street at both Randolph and Washington Streets. The southwest clock at the original Washington Street intersection, known as "The Great Clock", was installed on November 26, 1897. Marshall Field envisioned the clock as a beacon for his store which he viewed as a meeting place. The clock was installed after the southwest corner of the store had become a popular meeting place and people began leaving notes for one another on the Marshall Field's windows. The clock was an attempt to end this practice, and encourage punctuality.

Today, the building is located at 111 North State Street, between Washington and Randolph Streets, within the designated "Loop" Retail Historic District of the Chicago "Loop", across State Street from the Block 37 mall, across Randolph Street from the Joffrey Tower, and across Wabash Avenue from The Heritage at Millennium Park. An underground public concourse connects the basement to 25 East Washington Street, which formerly housed the Marshall Field's Men's Store. The building is a major hub for the "Chicago Pedway".

== Traditions and place in popular culture ==
Norman Rockwell, (1894–1978), famous Saturday Evening Post magazine cover, November 3, 1945 - "The Clock Mender"

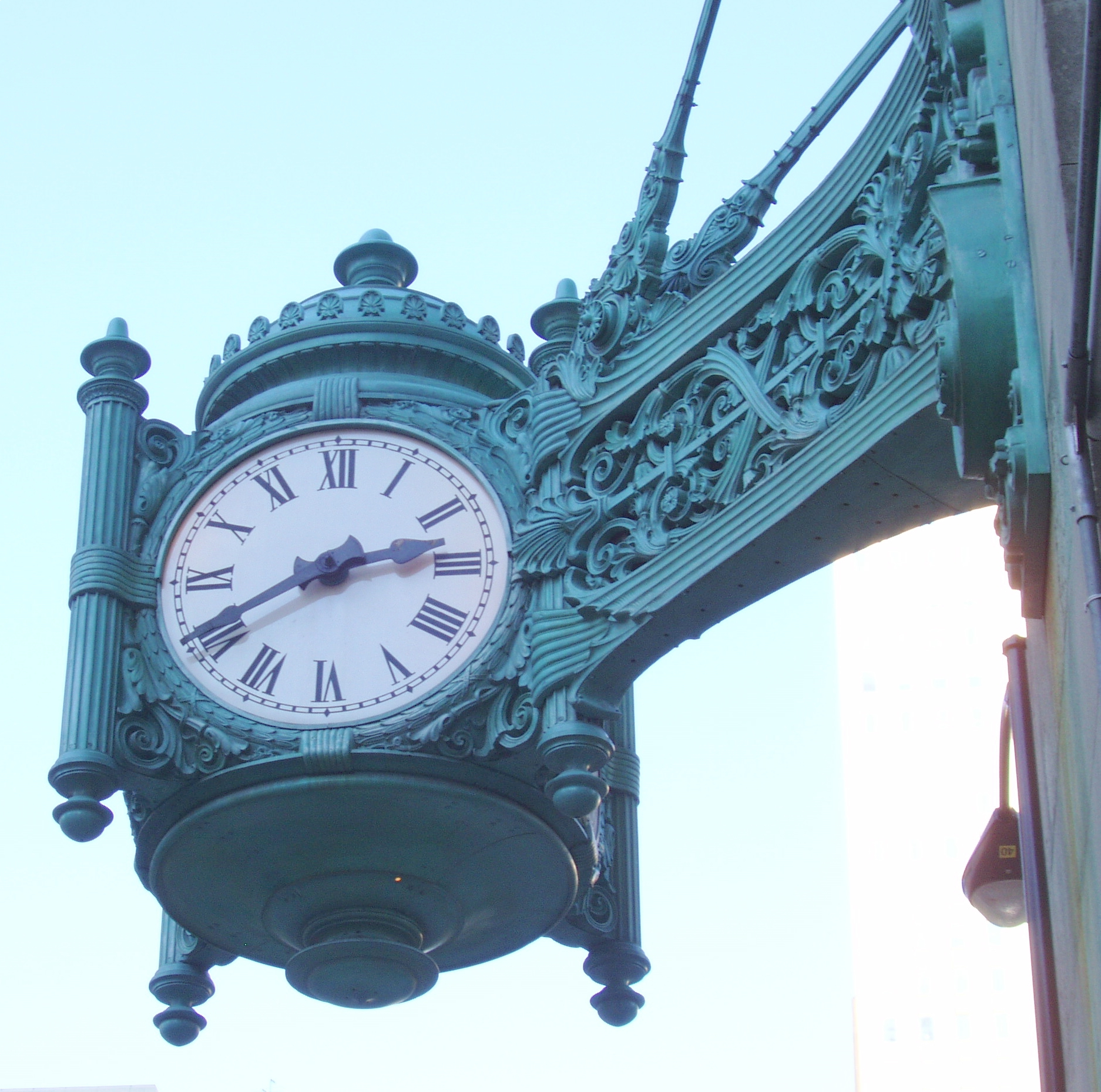
One of the famous iconic Marshall Field's "Great Clock"

The building has several Christmas traditions: it is known as the former production site of Frango mints and for the Walnut Room Christmas tree. It also hosts an ornate decorated display windows series at the street level. The windows display includes thirteen themed windows along State Street that in recent years have displayed the themes of the unfolding of stories of Snow White, Charlie and the Chocolate Factory, Paddington Bear, The Night Before Christmas, Harry Potter, and Cinderella. Annually a three-story tall Christmas tree is brought in for the Holiday season. In an effort to quell opposition to the merger/ conversion, Macy's made a formal statement of its intent to continue the traditions of a 45-foot (13.716 m) Christmas tree, a seventh floor "Frango" viewing kitchen, and animated holiday window displays.

On November 3, 1945, American illustrator Norman Rockwell drew a picture of one of the Marshall Field's Building clocks on the cover of the famous "Saturday Evening Post" magazine, entitled "The Clock Mender". The Rockwell painting shows a man perched atop a ladder and adjusting one of the Marshall Field's clock to correspond with his own pocket watch. The presence of the old Oriental Theatre in the background evidences the location. In 1948, Rockwell donated the original painting, "The Clock Mender", to the store, where it had hung on the seventh floor. The painting has since been donated to the Chicago Historical Society.

In John Dos Passos' novel The 42nd Parallel (1930), character Eric Egstrom is employed at this Marshall Field's building.

Authors G. K. Chesterton and Sinclair Lewis met in the Field's department store building's book department, which resulted in their collaboration on the unpublished play "Mary Queen of Scotch."

== Gallery ==
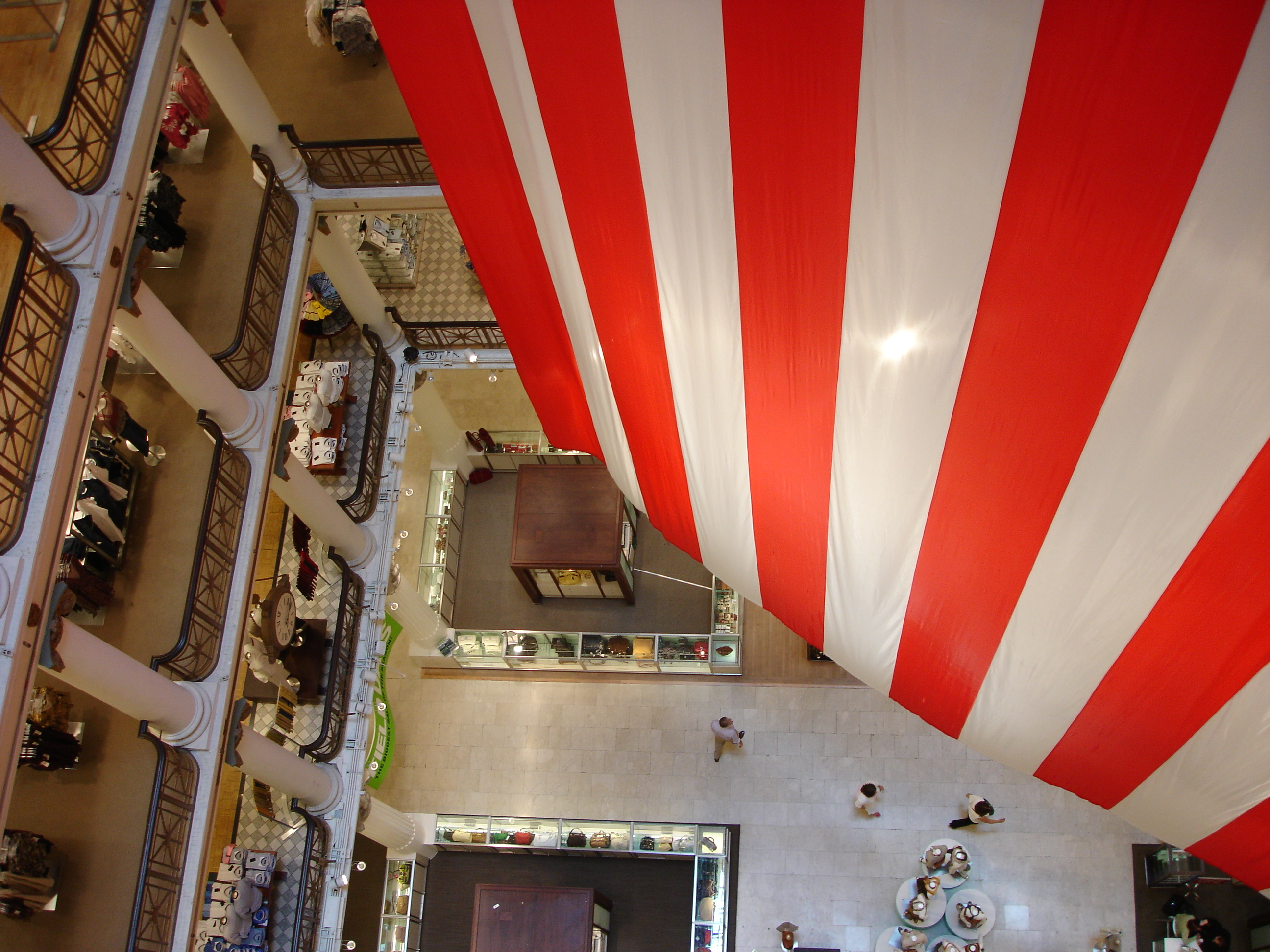
Looking down the northwest atrium with the edge of the hanging American flag in Marshall Field's

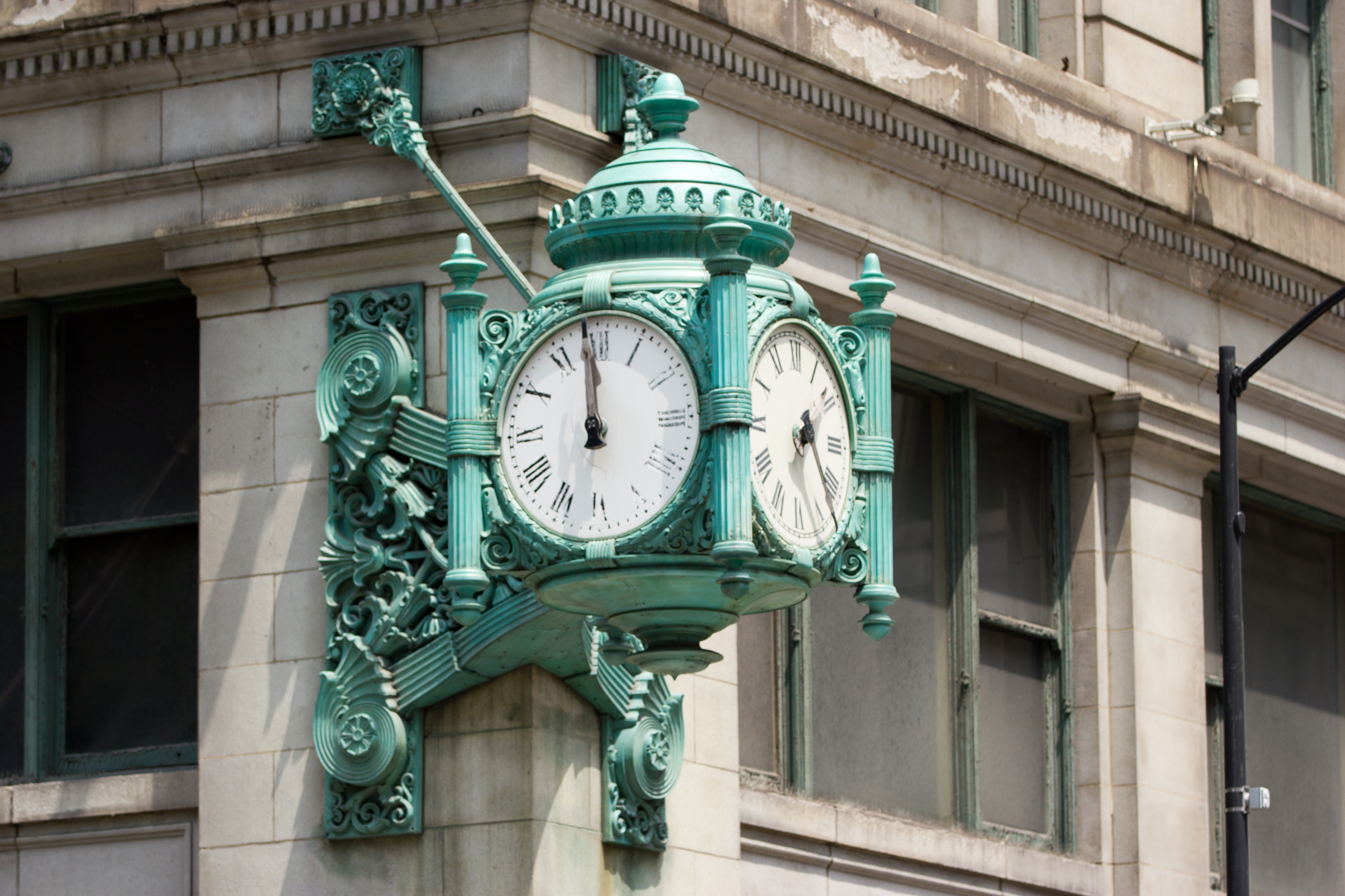
Detail of the "Great Clock" on the corner of the Marshall Field & Company Building, built 1891–1892, at North State and Washington Streets, erected 1897

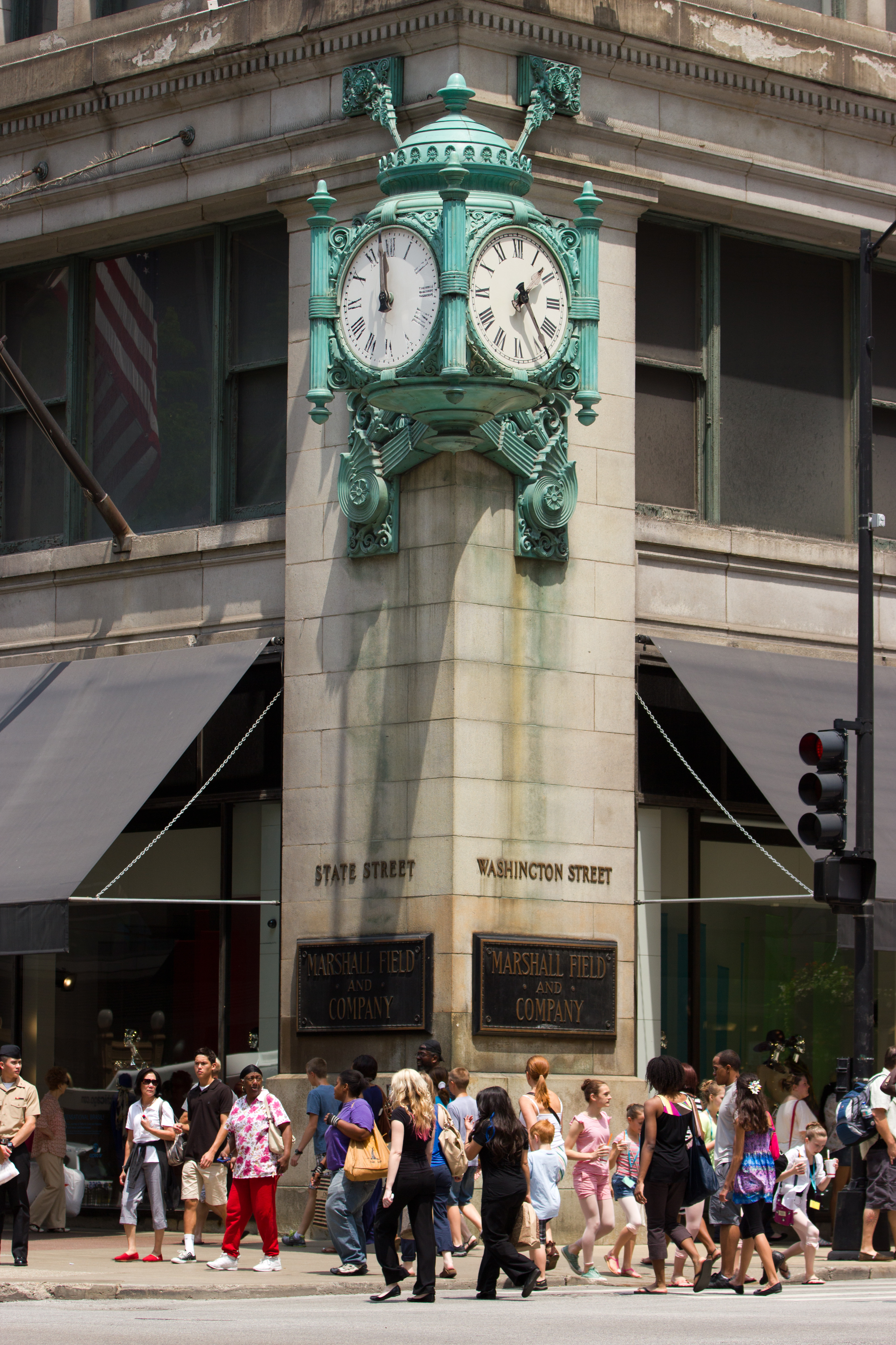
The "Great Clock" on the corner of the Marshall Field & Company Building of 1891–1892, above a crowd of pedestrians at North State and Washington Streets, erected 1897

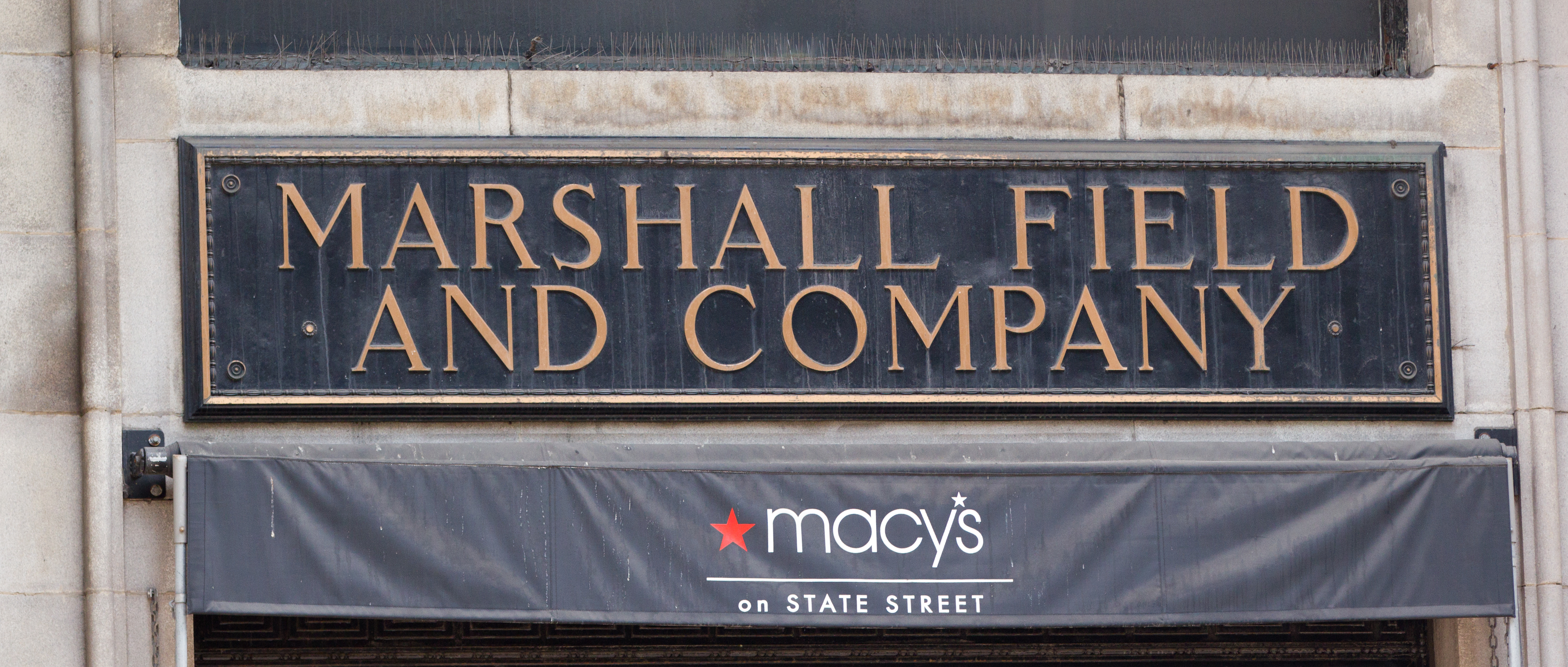
The original State Street entrance sign bronze plaque for Marshall Field and Company with adjacent new Macy's signage, Chicago, 2005

== See also ==
- List of National Historic Landmarks in Illinois
- National Register of Historic Places listings in Central Chicago
- Other National Historic Landmark department stores:
  - 280 Broadway
  - John Wanamaker Store
  - Macy's Herald Square
  - Sullivan Center
