= National Register of Historic Places listings in Chicago =

There are more than 350 places listed on the United States National Register of Historic Places in Chicago, Illinois, including 83 historic districts that may include numerous historic buildings, structures, objects and sites. This total is documented in the tables referenced below. Tables of these listings may be found in the following articles:

- National Register of Historic Places listings in Central Chicago
- National Register of Historic Places listings in North Side Chicago
- National Register of Historic Places listings in South Side Chicago
- National Register of Historic Places listings in West Side Chicago

The first sites in Chicago to be listed were four listed on October 15, 1966, when the National Register was created by the National Park Service: the settlement house Hull House, the Frank Lloyd Wright-designed Frederick C. Robie House, the Lorado Taft Midway Studios, and the site of First Self-Sustaining Nuclear Reaction. The NPS first incorporated previously named National Historic Landmarks, including these four. In total, thirty-four of the sites in Chicago are further designated National Historic Landmarks of the United States and there are three National Historic Landmark Districts, indicated by the darker colors in the tables.

There are numerous early skyscraper buildings designed by Louis Sullivan, and at least three sites relate to the city's role in nationwide retailing. Included also are numerous religious buildings, 15 hotels, and six theaters. Fully 55 are located in the downtown Loop area, including the Loop Retail Historic District itself.

Chicago is a historic and continuing world port city due to its location on the Great Lakes, which has an outlet to the Atlantic Ocean via the St. Lawrence Seaway. There are two listed properties that are watercraft: the German submarine U-505, and a U.S. aircraft rescue vehicle, AVR 661. Two National Historic Landmark ships were formerly located in Chicago, but have been relocated out of state.

To be listed on the National Register, sites must retain their historic integrity, they usually must be 50 years old at least, and their listing must be promoted – or at least not opposed – by the current owner. As a result of these criteria, many historically important sites in Chicago are not yet listed. Over 100 are also among the City of Chicago-designated landmarks, which include numerous more structures that do not yet meet National Register criteria for historic integrity or for other reasons have not been listed.

== See also ==
- List of Chicago Landmarks
- National Register of Historic Places listings in Illinois
- List of National Historic Landmarks in Illinois
