= Benson & Rixon Building =

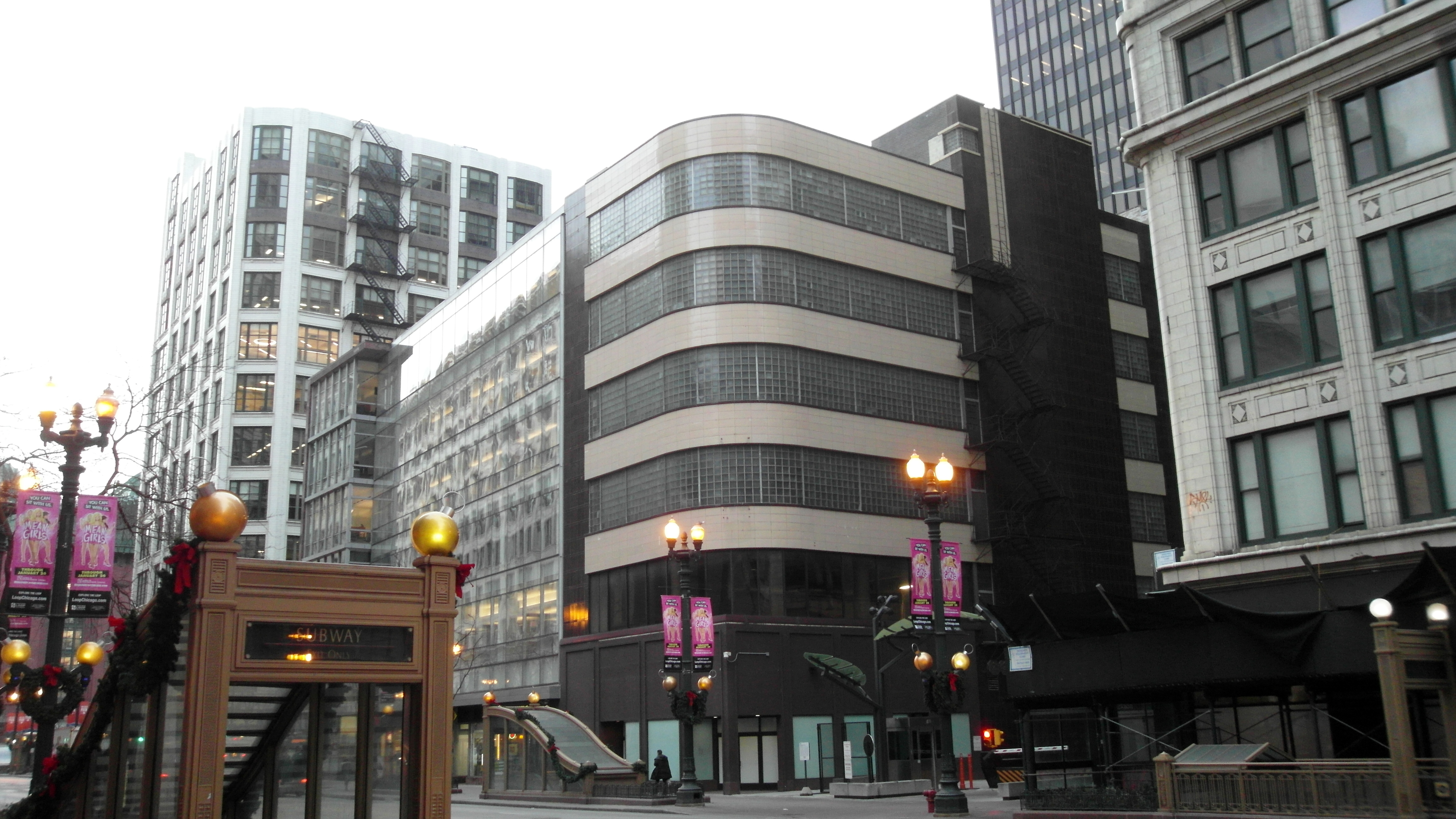
- Interactive map of the Benson & Rixon Building area

General information
- Architectural style: Streamline Moderne
- Location: 230 S. State Street, Chicago, Illinois
- Coordinates: 41°52′43.3″N 87°37′40.5″W
- Completed: 1937

Technical details
- Floor count: 6

Design and construction
- Architect: Alfred S. Alschuler

The Benson & Rixon Building is a Streamline Moderne building in Chicago's Loop. It was designed by Alfred S. Alschuler, and was built in 1937.

== History ==
Men's clothing retailer Benson & Rixon purchased the property where the building stands in 1936 for $598,500. The building was constructed at a cost of $375,000, and their new store opened on October 12, 1937. Benson & Rixon's State Street store was previously in the Consumers Building, across Quincy Street. The building was remodeled in 1958 and 1970. Alterations in 1970 included replacing the original rounded storefront with a square one. In 1966, Benson-Rixon was purchased by Eagle Clothes, and the chain was phased out by February 1973. The store became Leading Man Clothing.

In late October 1979, Cirilo McSween opened a McDonald's franchise in the building. It was the first African-American owned business in the State Street Mall. In 1983, it was the top McDonald's restaurant in the country, in terms of gross sales. The restaurant remained open until the 2010s.

In 2005, the General Services Administration acquired the Benson & Rixon Building and neighboring buildings, using eminent domain to seize some of the properties, citing the need for increased security around the Dirksen Federal Building. In 2012, the Benson & Rixon Building and the neighboring Bond Building were renovated.
