= Marshall Field (disambiguation) =

Marshall Field (1834–1906) was the founder of Marshall Field's.

Marshall Field may also refer to:

- Marshall Field III (1893–1956), publisher, founder of the Chicago Sun newspaper
- Marshall Field IV (1916–1965), owner of the Chicago Sun-Times
- Stagg Field, American football stadium at the University of Chicago opened in 1893 as Marshall Field, renamed in 1913, and demolished in 1957
- Marshall Army Airfield Named Marshall Field from 1923 until 1948.

== See also ==
- Marshall Field's (disambiguation)
  - Marshall Field's department store
- Field Marshall, a brand of tractor
- Field marshal, the most senior military rank in many armies
