= Loop Retail Historic District =

Historic district in Illinois, United States

- U.S. National Register of Historic Places
- U.S. Historic district
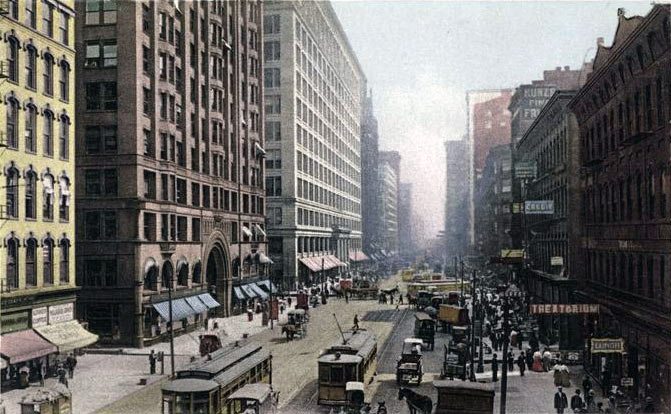
- State Street in 1907

- Location within Chicago metropolitan area Location within Illinois Location within the United States
- Location: Chicago, Illinois
- Coordinates: 41°53′N 87°38′W
- Area: 26 acres (11 ha)
- Built: 1871
- Architect: Holabird and Roche; Sullivan, Louis Henri, et al.
- Architectural style: Italianate, Early Commercial, Chicago
- NRHP reference No.: 98001351
- Added to NRHP: November 27, 1998

Loop Retail Historic District is a shopping district within the Chicago Loop community area in Cook County, Illinois, United States. It is bounded by Lake Street to the north, Ida B. Wells Drive to the south, State Street to the west and Wabash Avenue to the east. The district has the highest density of National Historic Landmark, National Register of Historic Places and Chicago Landmark designated buildings in Chicago. It hosts several historic buildings including former department store flagship locations Marshall Field and Company Building (now Macy's at State Street), and the Sullivan Center (formerly Carson, Pirie, Scott and Company Building). It was added to the National Register of Historic Places on November 27, 1998. It includes 74 contributing buildings and structures, including 13 separately listed Registered Historic Places, and 22 non-contributing buildings. Other significant buildings in the district include the Joffrey Tower, Chicago Theatre, Palmer House, and Page Brothers Building. It also hosts DePaul University's College of Commerce, which includes the Kellstadt Graduate School of Business and the Robert Morris College.

The district is most commonly associated with department store buildings. In its heyday the district hosted seven prominent department stores from which six buildings remain today. These include the aforementioned Marshall Field and Company Building, and Carson, Pirie, Scott and Company Buildings as well as the National Register of Historic Places A. M. Rothschild & Company Store at 333 S. State St. The other department store buildings are contributing properties.

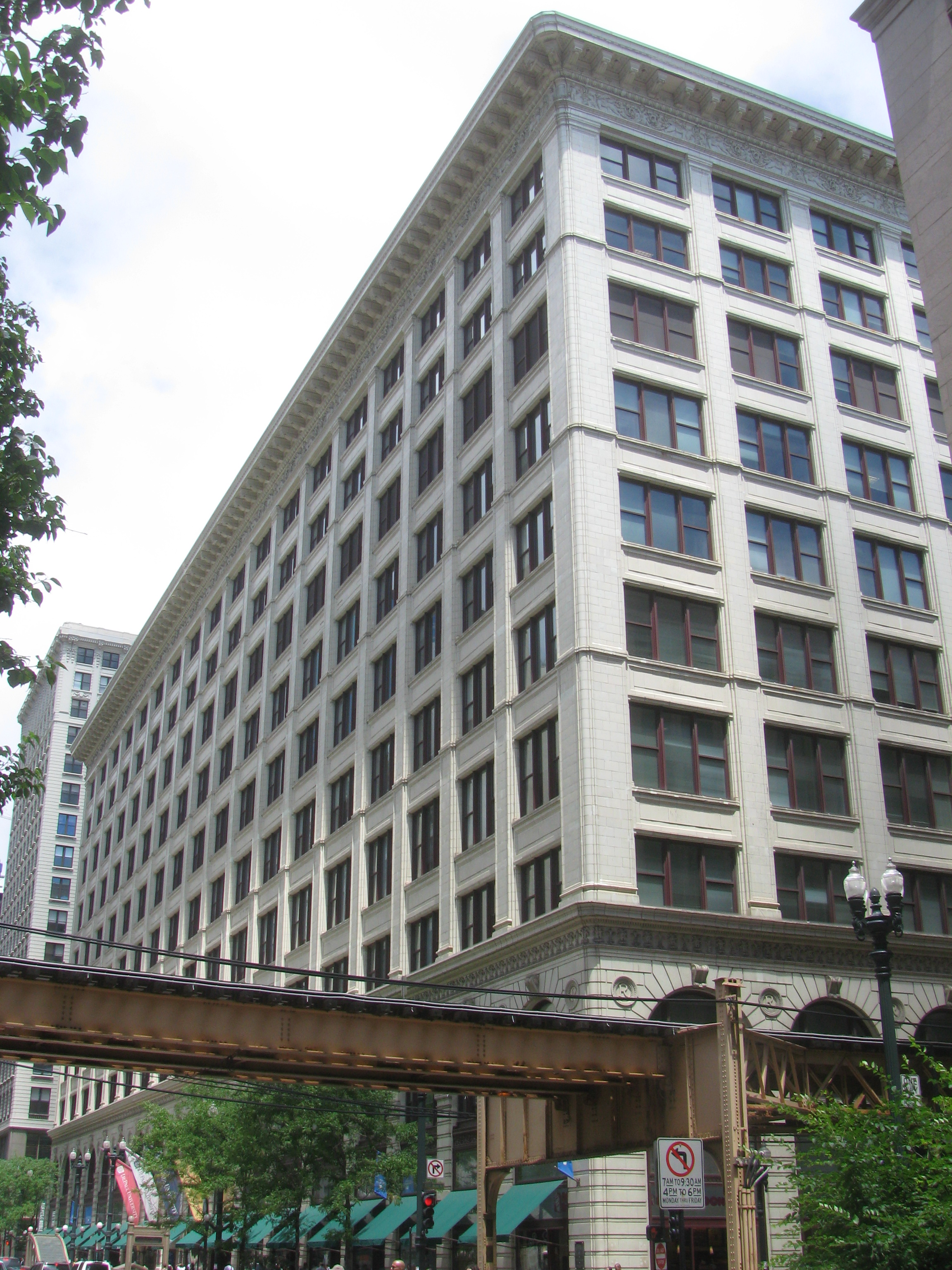
The A. M. Rothschild & Company Store at 333 S. State St. is part of the historic district

== History ==
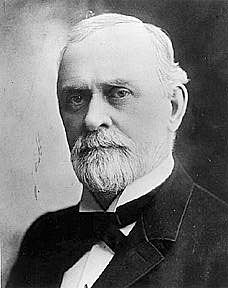
Potter Palmer

The district's period of historic significance was 1872–1949. In the late 1860s, Potter Palmer improved State Street by building his own Palmer House hotel on State Street in 1870. He had also convinced Marshall Field and Levi Leiter to move the Field, Leiter & Co. store to State Street in 1868. Chicago's retailing center was State Street (anchored by Marshall Field's) in the downtown Loop after the Great Chicago Fire of 1871. Convenient mass transit such as streetcars and elevated trains, supported a retail corridor along State Street from Lake Street to Van Buren Street. State Street became a shopping destination during the 1900s, and is referred to in Frank Sinatra's song Chicago (That Toddlin' Town), where Frank refers it to "State Street, that Great Street." At one time seven major department stores were situated on State Street: Benson & Rixon, Karolls, Charles A. Stevens and Mandel Brothers (in addition to Marshall Field's and Carson, Pirie Scott).

However Chicago evolved and by the 1920s, commuter suburbs began to have significant retail districts. After 1950, suburban development reduced the role of the Loop's daily significance to many Chicagoans as downtown retail sales slipped. However, the Magnificent Mile kept a luxury shopping district close to the central business district.

In 1979, Chicago Mayor Jane Byrne converted the downtown portion into a pedestrian mall with only bus traffic allowed. Mayor Richard M. Daley oversaw the State Street Revitalization Project and on November 15, 1996, the street was reopened to traffic. In addition, the Chicago Transit Authority Red Line serves State Street and the elevated trains of the Chicago 'L' serve Wabash and Lake streets in this district. Current revitalization is catering to the mix of student residents and other new residents with the newly available residential spaces.

== Gallery ==
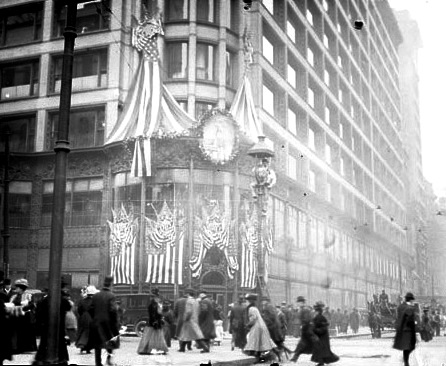
Carson Pirie Scott Building on Lincoln's 100th Birthday

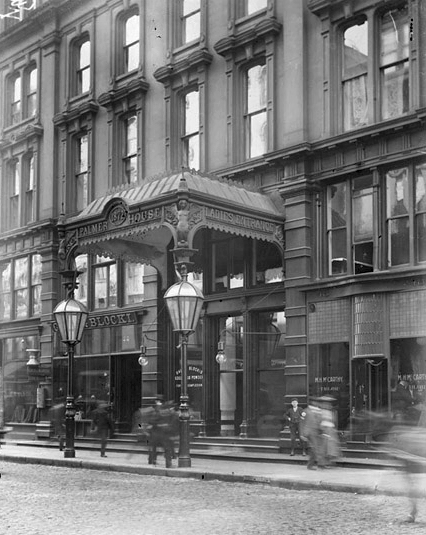
Palmer House Hotel Ladies Entrance

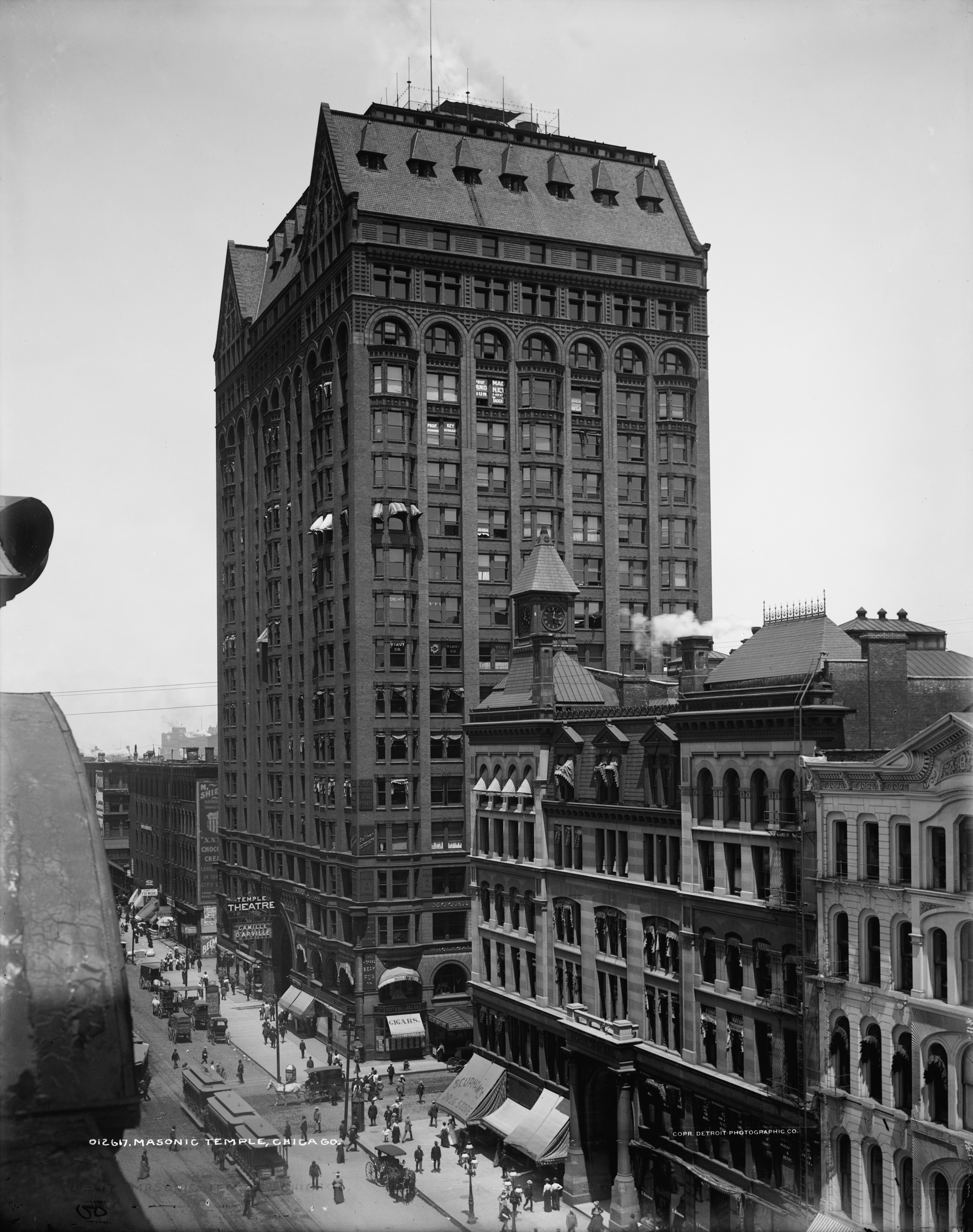
Masonic Temple, 1900

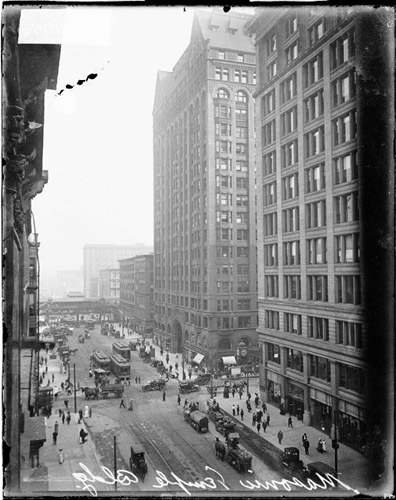
Masonic Temple with new Marshall Field and Company Building, 1911

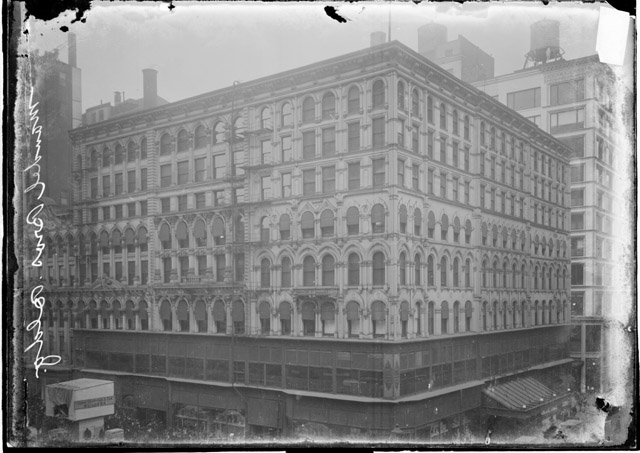
Mandel Brothers Store

== See also ==
- National Register of Historic Places listings in Central Chicago
