= Montastruc, Tarn-et-Garonne =

Montastruc
- Commune
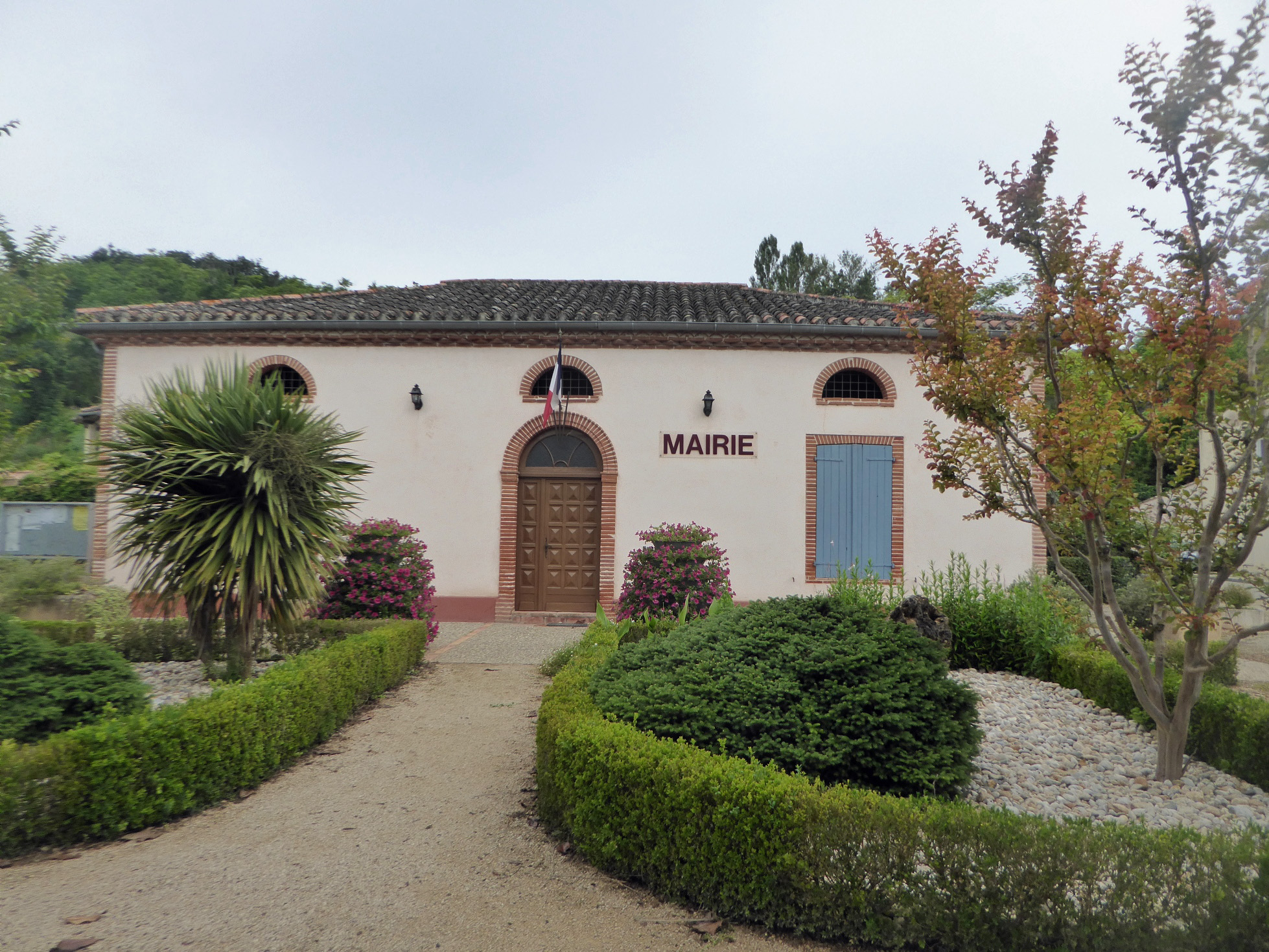
- Town hall
- Location of Montastruc
- Location within France Location within Occitanie
- Coordinates: 44°06′07″N 1°17′41″E
- Country: France
- Region: Occitania
- Department: Tarn-et-Garonne
- Arrondissement: Montauban
- Canton: Quercy-Aveyron
- Intercommunality: CC du Pays de Lafrançaise

Government
  - Mayor (2020–2026): Jean-Luc Silot
- Area^{1}: 4.67 km^{2} (1.80 sq mi)
- Elevation: 80 m (260 ft)
- Highest elevation: 213 m (699 ft)
- Lowest elevation: 73 m (240 ft)
- Population (2023): 303
  - Density: 64.9/km^{2} (168/sq mi)
- Time zone: UTC+01:00 (CET)
  - Summer (DST): UTC+02:00 (CEST)
- INSEE/Postal code: 82120 /82130
- ^{1} French Land Register data, which excludes lakes, ponds, glaciers > 1 km^{2} (0.386 sq mi or 247 acres) and river estuaries.

Montastruc (French pronunciation: [mɔ̃tastʁyk]) is a commune in the Tarn-et-Garonne department in the Occitanie region in southern France.

Montrastruc is not the site of the "Montastruc rock shelter" in which prehistoric remains have been found in Bruniquel. (These include the carving of the Swimming Reindeer which is held by the British Museum and which was included in A History of the World in 100 Objects and the Mammoth spear thrower.)

== See also ==
- Communes of the Tarn-et-Garonne department
