= Temenos =

Piece of land assigned as an official domain or dedicated to gods

A temenos (Ancient Greek: τέμενος; pl. τεμένη, temenē) is a piece of land cut off and assigned as an official domain, especially to kings and chiefs, or a piece of land marked off from common uses and dedicated to a god, such as a sanctuary, holy grove, or holy precinct.

A temenos enclosed a sacred space called a hieron. It was usually surrounded by a wall, ditch, or line of stones. All things inside the demarcated area belonged to the designated god. Greeks could find asylum within a sanctuary and be under the protection of the deity and could not be moved against their will.

== Etymology ==
The word derives from the Greek verb τέμνω (temnō), "I cut". The earliest attested form of the word is the Mycenaean Greek 𐀳𐀕𐀜, te-me-no, written in Linear B syllabic script.

The Latin language equivalent was fanum.

In religious discourse in English, temenos has also come to refer to a territory, plane, receptacle or field of deity or divinity.

== Examples ==
- The race-course of the Pythian Games is called a temenos.
- The sacred valley of the Nile is the Νείλοιο πῖον τέμενος Κρονίδα ("the rich temenos of the Cronide by the Nile");
- The Acropolis of Athens is the ἱερὸν τέμενος ("holy temenos") of Pallas Athena.
- A large example of a Bronze Age Minoan temenos is at the Juktas Sanctuary of the palace of Knossos on ancient Crete in present-day Greece, the temple having a massive northern temenos.
- Another example is at Olympia, the temenos of Zeus.
- There were temene dedicated to Apollo in many places, as he was a patron god of settlers.
- There is a Temenos area in the Romano-British temple complex of the Roman town of Caerwent in Wales
- Herod's expansion of the Temple Mount in Jerusalem, which enlarged the Second Jewish Temple and its sanctuary, produced the largest temenos in the ancient world.

== Historical development ==
The concept of temenos arose in classical antiquity as an area reserved for worship of the gods. Some authors have used the term to apply to a sacred grove of trees, isolated from everyday living spaces, while other usage points to areas within ancient urban development that are parts of sanctuaries.

A temenos is often physically marked by a peribolos fence or wall (e.g. Delphi) as a structural boundary.

Originally, the peribolos was often just a set of marker stones demarcating the boundary, or a light fence. The earliest sanctuaries appear to have begun as a peribolos around a sacred grove, spring, cave, or other feature, with an altar but no temple or cult image. Later, as Greek sanctuaries became more elaborate, large stone walls with gateways or gatehouses were built around important sanctuaries, although the most famous, the Acropolis of Athens, had an elaborate enclosure because it began as a palace and military citadel and was converted into a sanctuary.

== Psychological interpretation ==
Carl Jung relates the temenos to the spellbinding or magic circle, which acts as a "square space" where mental "work" can take place. This temenos resembles among others a "symmetrical rose garden with a fountain in the middle" in which an encounter with the unconscious can be had and where these unconscious contents can safely be brought into the light of consciousness. In this manner, one can meet one's own animus / anima, shadow, wise old wo/man (senex), and finally the self. (Note: Animus, ... senex, etc. were technical terms that Jung coined for archetypal personifications of (unpersonal) unconscious contents which he believed to be part of the 'collective unconscious'.)

== See also ==
- Bruniquel Cave
- Kiva
- Kshetra

== Sources ==
- Molyneaux, Brian Leigh; Vitebsky, P. (2000). Sacred Earth, Sacred Stones: Spiritual site and landscapes, ancient alignments, Earth energy. London, UK: Duncan Baird. ISBN 1-903296-07-2.
- Jung, C.G. (1968). Psychology and Alchemy. Collected Works. Vol. 12. Princeton, NJ: Princeton University Press. ISBN 0-691-01831-6.
