= Alzou =

Alzou may refer to the following rivers in France:

- Alzou (Ouysse), tributary of the Ouysse, in the Lot department
- Alzou (Aveyron), tributary of the Aveyron, in the Aveyron department
