= Château de Bruniquel =

Castle in the French commune of Bruniquel

Coordinates: 44°3′22″N 1°39′58″E

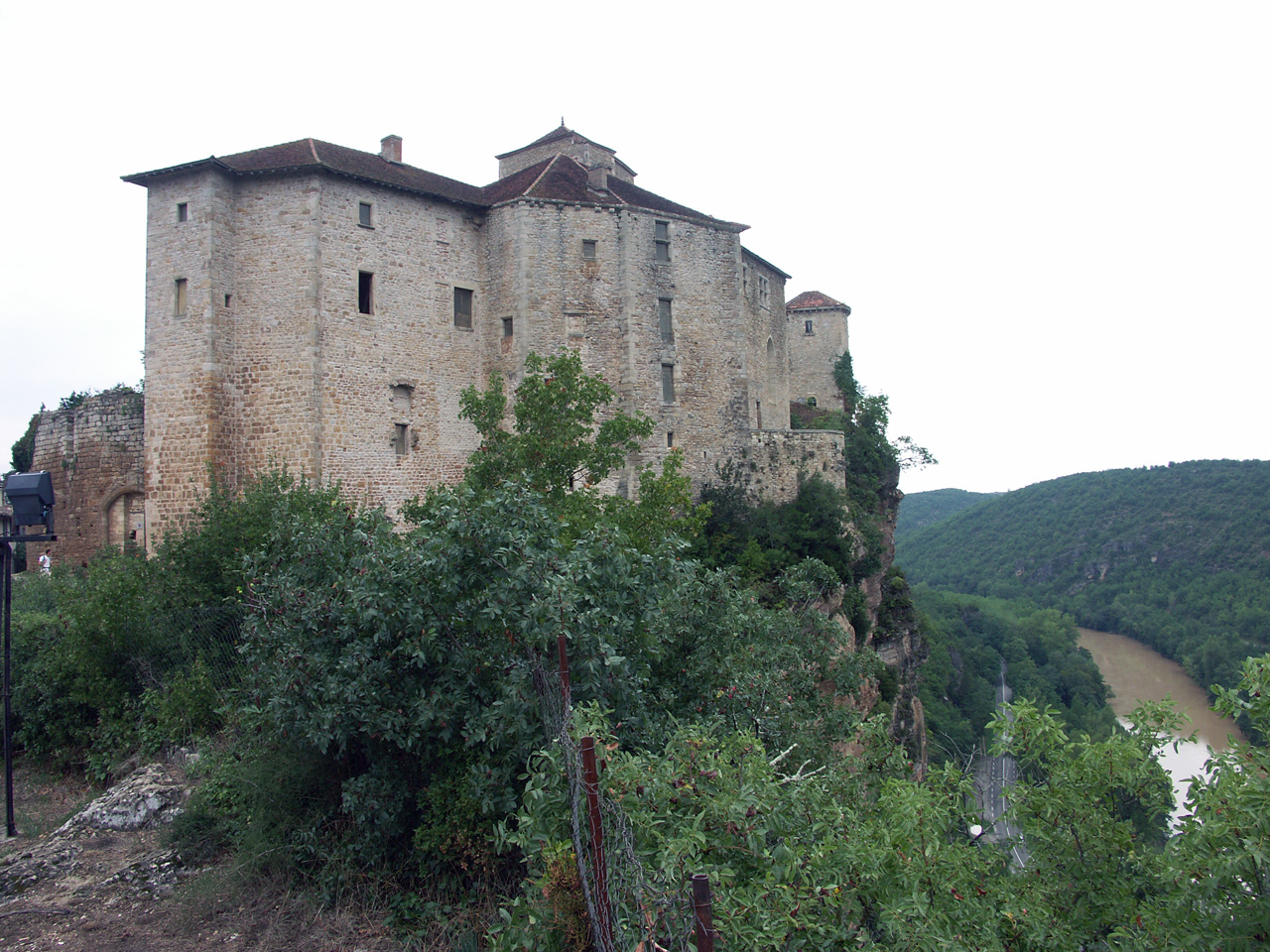
Châteaux de Bruniquel

The Château de Bruniquel is a castle in the French commune of Bruniquel, in the Tarn-et-Garonne département of the Occitanie region of France.

== Name ==
The castle is often called Châteaux de Bruniquel (i.e. castles, plural). This is because, two centuries after its construction, the castle was shared between two branches of the Comminges house, hence "château vieux" (old castle) and "château jeune" (young castle).

== Legend ==
According to Gregory of Tours, the Merovingian Queen Brunehaut or Brunhilda built the first castle, "château vieux" or "castel Biel in the 6th century on the site of a Roman castrum.

== Architecture ==
Of the early 12th century castle, the only remains are partial foundations, parts of walls and the keep, the so-called Tour de Brunehaut. The site has been altered at various times, notably in the 13th, 15th, 17th and 19th centuries.

The "château vieux" still has its keep from the 12th century, an era when the castle was the property of the Counts of Toulouse, and its residence from the 13th century. It also has a Renaissance gallery; other parts have undergone extensive remodelling in the 18th and 19th centuries. The keep is named after Brunehaut (la tour de la Reine Brunehaut).

The "château jeune" dominates the confluence of the rivers Aveyron and Vère from a height of 90 m (300 ft). It was built between 1485 and 1510 and was remodelled during the Baroque period. Its Renaissance gallery has six arcades.

A chimney from Bruniquel was taken and installed in the 19th century in the dining room at the Château de Lastours in Réalville.

== Today ==
The site was a location for the 1975 film Le Vieux Fusil, directed by Robert Enrico and starring Romy Schneider, Philippe Noiret and Jean Bouise. The well now seen in the centre is not original; it was placed there for the film. Photographs showing the filming are displayed in the château vieux.

The whole site has been classified as a historic monument (monument historique) since 1840 and has recently been restored. The castle has been owned by the commune since 1987 and is open to the public from March to mid-November.

== Gallery ==
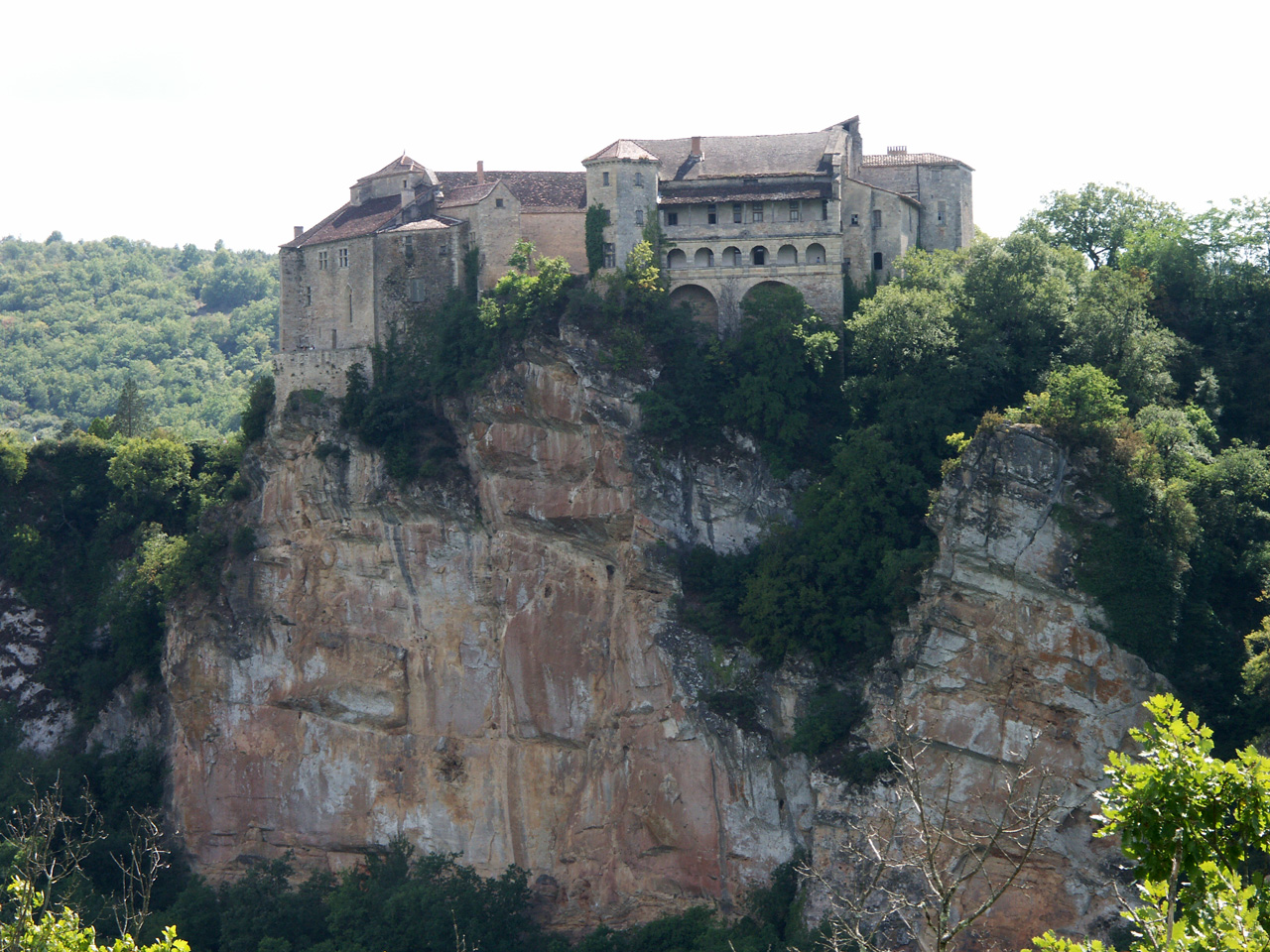

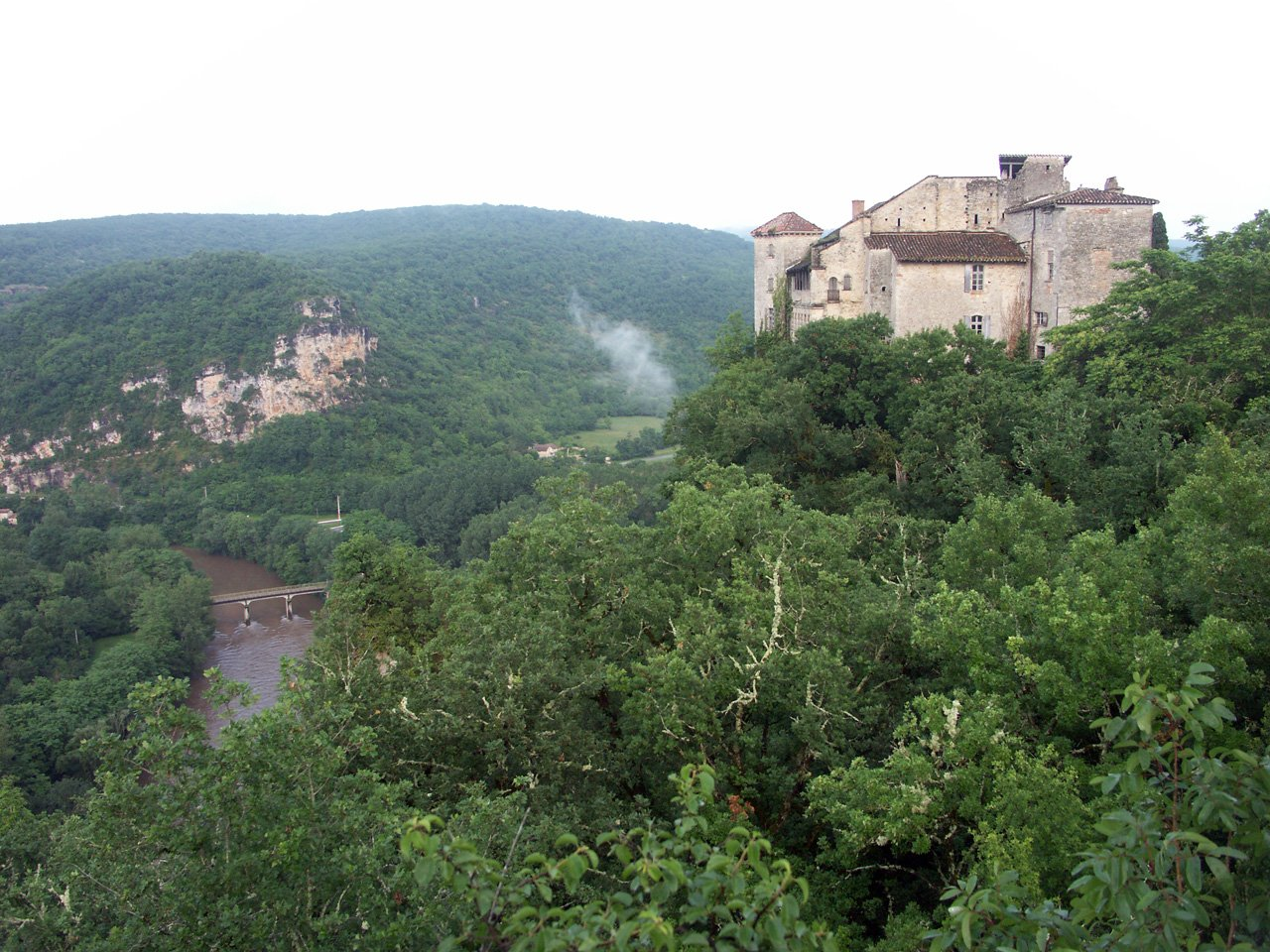

== See also ==
- List of castles in France
