= Montfermier =

- Commune
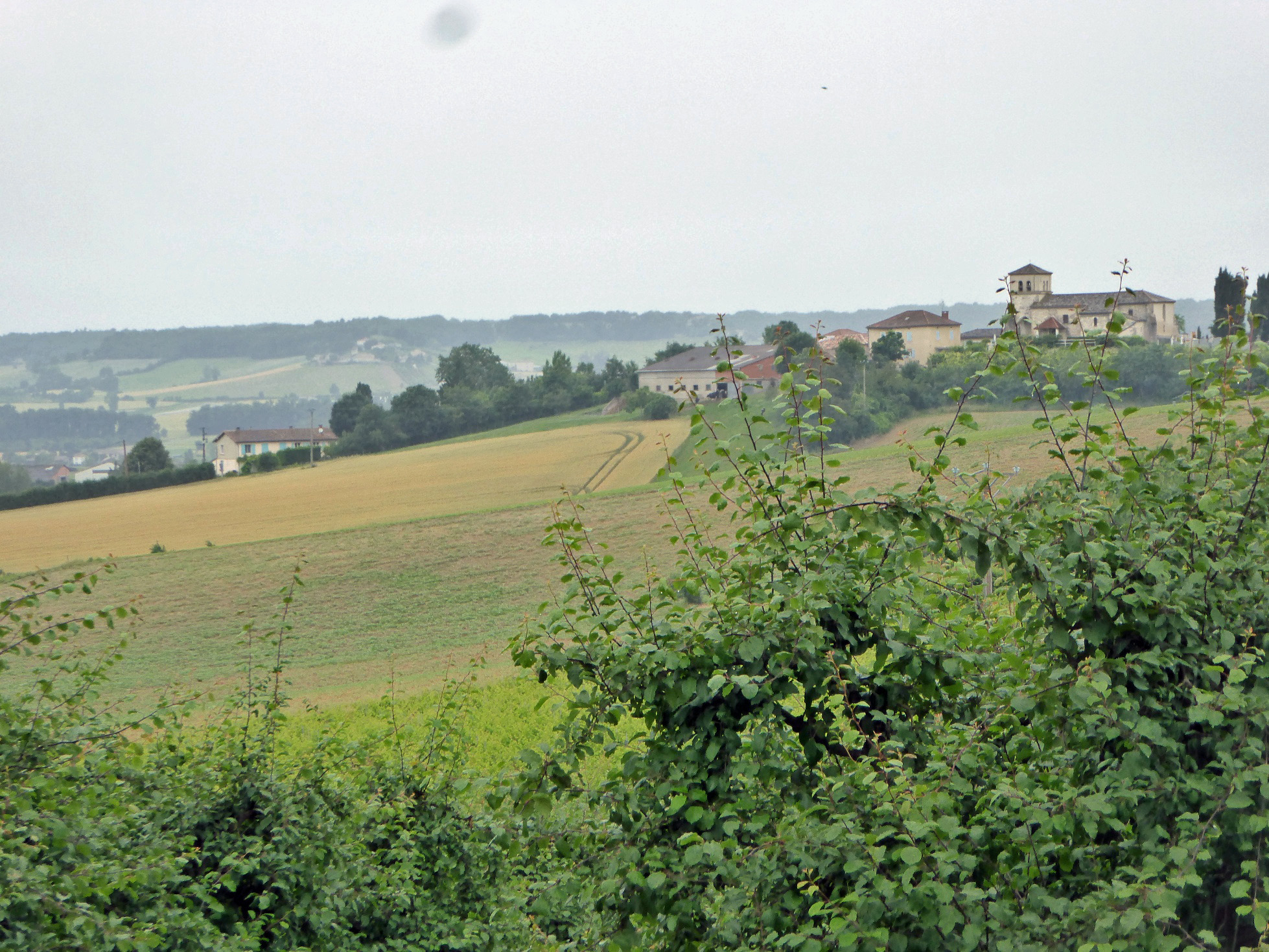
- Location of Montfermier
- Location within France Location within Occitanie
- Coordinates: 44°13′12″N 1°24′38″E
- Country: France
- Region: Occitania
- Department: Tarn-et-Garonne
- Arrondissement: Montauban
- Canton: Quercy-Aveyron
- Intercommunality: Quercy caussadais

Government
  - Mayor (2020–2026): Rémy Soupa
- Area^{1}: 6.55 km^{2} (2.53 sq mi)
- Elevation: 210 m (690 ft)
- Highest elevation: 229 m (751 ft)
- Lowest elevation: 125 m (410 ft)
- Population (2023): 111
  - Density: 16.9/km^{2} (43.9/sq mi)
- Time zone: UTC+01:00 (CET)
  - Summer (DST): UTC+02:00 (CEST)
- INSEE/Postal code: 82128 /82270
- ^{1} French Land Register data, which excludes lakes, ponds, glaciers > 1 km^{2} (0.386 sq mi or 247 acres) and river estuaries.

Montfermier (French pronunciation: [mɔ̃fɛʁmje]; Occitan: Montfermièr) is a commune in the Tarn-et-Garonne department in the Occitanie region in southern France.

== See also ==
- Communes of the Tarn-et-Garonne department
