= Aveyron (river) =

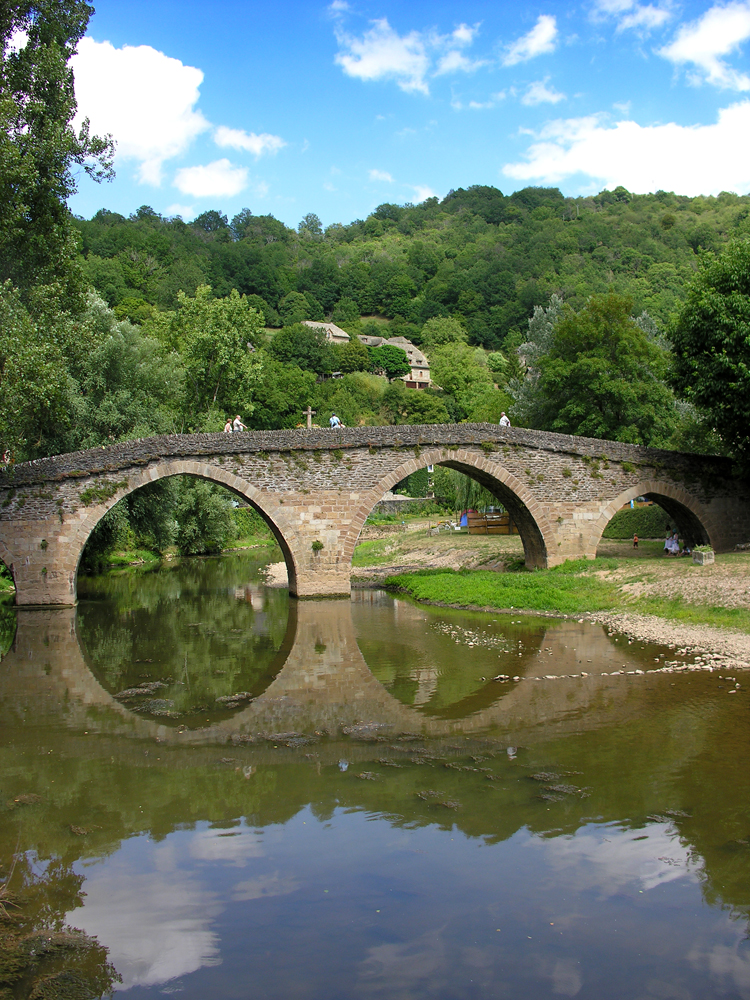
- 15th-century bridge at Belcastel

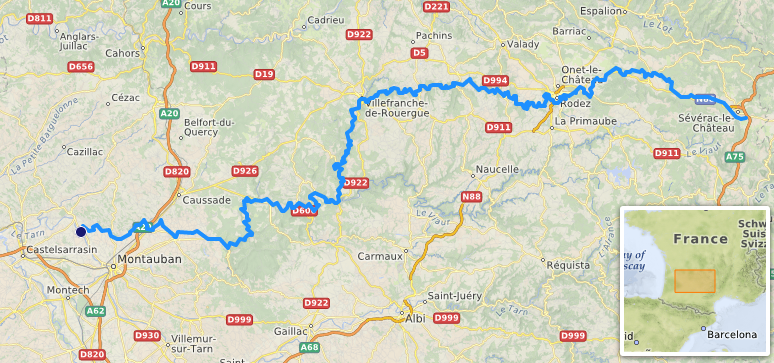
- Native name: L'Aveyron (French)

Location
- Country: France

Physical characteristics
- Source
  - location: Massif Central
- Mouth
  - location: Tarn
  - coordinates: 44°5′13″N 1°16′0″E
- Length: 291 km (181 mi)
- Basin size: 5,300 km^{2} (2,000 sq mi)
- Discharge
  - average: 57 m^{3}/s (2,000 cu ft/s)

Basin features
- Progression: Tarn→ Garonne→ Gironde estuary→ Atlantic Ocean

The Aveyron (French pronunciation: [aveʁɔ̃]; Occitan: Avairon) is a 291 km long river in southern France, right tributary of the Tarn. It rises in the southern Massif Central, near Sévérac-le-Château.

In 1855, evidence of prehistoric humans was discovered near Bruniquel beneath a hill called Montastruc. The hill was 98 feet high. According to contemporary accounts, the rock overhang extended for about 46 feet along the river, enclosing an area of 298 square yards. Within this shelter, archaeologists found the 13,000-year-old sculpture known as the Swimming Reindeer.

== Tributaries include ==
- Viaur
- Cérou
- Vère
- Alzou

== Places along the river ==
The Aveyron flows west through the following départements and towns:

- Aveyron (named after the river): Rodez, Villefranche-de-Rouergue.
- Tarn.
- Tarn-et-Garonne.
  Bruniquel: a town north-east of Toulouse

It flows into the Tarn near Lafrançaise, north-west of Montauban.
