= Bruniquel Cave =

Cave and archaeological site in France with Neanderthal stalagmite structures

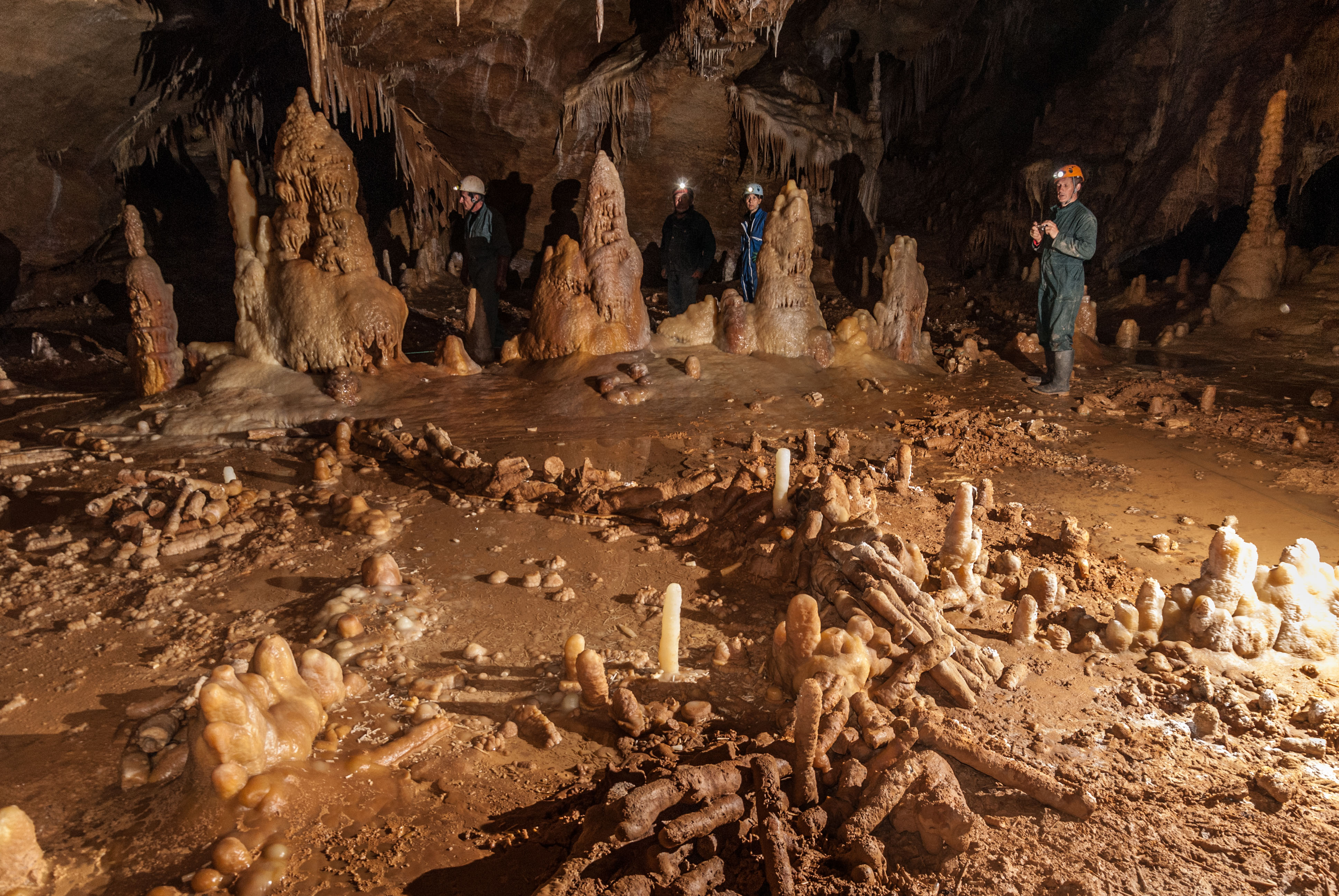
- The ring structures built in Bruniquel cave by Neanderthals using speleofacts

- Location in Occitania, France
- 44°3′51″N 1°40′33″E
- Periods: Palaeolithic
- Location: Bruniquel, Occitania, France

History
- Built: c. 176,500 years ago

Site notes
- Discovered: 1990

Bruniquel Cave is an archeological site near Bruniquel, in an area which has many paleolithic sites, east of Montauban in southwestern France. Annular (ring) and accumulation (pile) structures made of broken stalagmites have been found 336 metres from the cave entrance. Traces of fire were also found. The constructions have been dated to approximately 176,500 years ago.

In a letter to Nature reporting the discovery in 2016, Jacques Jaubert and his co-authors state the structures are of anthropogenic origin, and as early Neanderthals were the only humans in the area at that time, they must have been the builders, a conclusion that is accepted by Chris Stringer of the Natural History Museum in London.

The discovery demonstrates Neanderthals were capable of building more elaborate structures than previously realised, and had a more complex social organisation than previously thought. The modern human Aurignacian culture, more than 100,000 years later, is not known to have produced constructions in caves.

== Discovery ==
Bruniquel Cave was closed naturally during the Pleistocene. A complex structure containing three circles located in the cave was discovered when cavers dug through the collapsed entrance in 1990. During initial research in the cave during the early 1990s, a plan was made of the circles. A burnt bone found in the cave was carbon-dated to more than 47,600 years because carbon-14 was no longer detectable in the bone, indicating thus a greater age. Research stopped after the death of the lead archaeologist François Rouzaud and at that time it was unclear whether the structures could be attributed to the Neanderthals.

In 2013, Jacques Jaubert and his colleagues decided to study and date the structures. They published a letter outlining the results of their research in Nature in 2016.

== The constructions ==
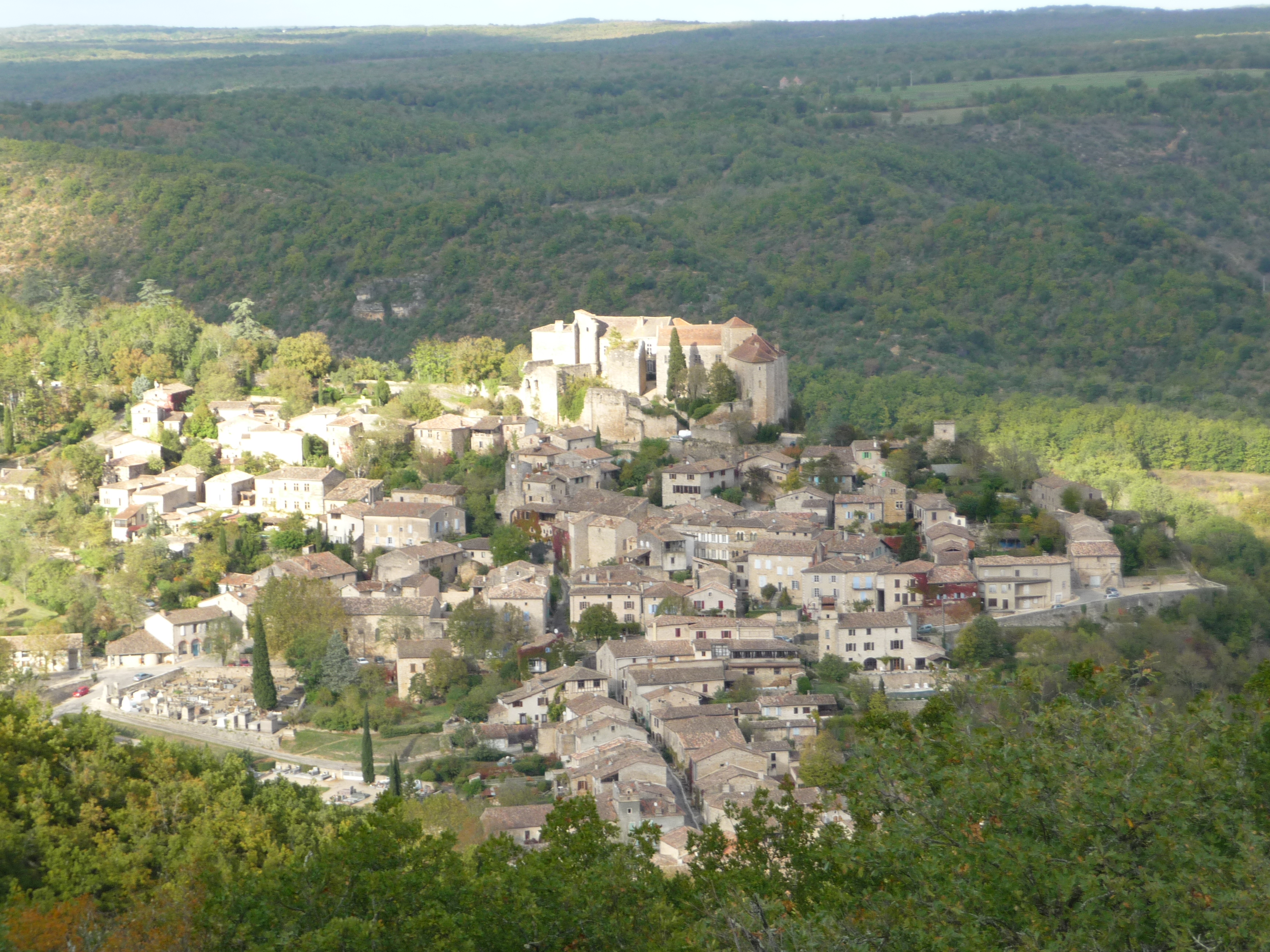
The village of Bruniquel

The artificial ring structures made of broken stalagmites now have been dated by uranium series dating as 176.5 (±2.1) thousand years old, with 2σ uncertainties (95.5% probability). There are two annular structures, one 6.7 by 4.5 metres (ellipse major/minor axes), and the other 2.2 by 2.1 metres (ellipse major/minor axes), composed of one to four aligned layers of stalagmites, with some small pieces placed inside the layers to support them. Some stalagmites were placed vertically against the rings, possibly as reinforcement. There are also four stacks of stalagmites measuring between 0.55 and 2.60 metres in diameter, two of which were inside the large ring and two outside it. Approximately 400 stalagmite pieces (called "speleofacts" by the researchers) were used in the construction of the structure, with a total length of 112.4 metres and weight of approximately 2.2 tons.

Very few of the stalagmites are whole, with half being from the middle of a broken off portion, trimmed to exclude the root and tip. All six structures show signs of fire, with 57 reddened and 66 blackened pieces. The stalagmite pieces are well calibrated, with an average length of 34.4 cm for the large ring and 29.5 cm for a small one, which in the view of Jaubert and colleagues strongly suggests intentional construction. Burnt organic material was also found, including a 6.7 cm bone from a bear or large herbivore. As of 2023, no other evidence of human activity has yet to be found during the archaeological research that continues in the cave.

== Interpretation ==
The constructions were made during the cold MIS6 period, but calcite flows on the surface of the main ring are similar in age to the structures, showing that in spite of the generally glacial conditions, the climate was then warm and humid enough to allow calcite deposition. The researchers suggest that the constructions may date to a warm phase in the cold period. Chris Stringer suggests that the cave may have provided a temporary refuge from arctic conditions, however, and evidence of occupation may be found under unexcavated sediments or later calcitic encrustations.

Deep karst is a difficult environment, and before the discovery of Bruniquel, Neanderthal constructions in caves beyond the distance exposed to daylight, and thus requiring artificial lighting, were completely unknown. Even in caves visited by modern humans during the Upper Paleolithic, there are no proven cases of constructions. Stringer observes that: "this discovery provides clear evidence that Neanderthals had fully human capabilities in the planning and the construction of 'stone' structures". It is not known whether the structures were built as part of a ritual or had a symbolic function.

In the view of Jaubert and his colleagues:

The attribution of the Bruniquel constructions to early Neanderthals is unprecedented in two ways. First, it reveals the appropriation of a deep karst space (including lighting) by a pre-modern human species. Second, it concerns elaborate constructions that have never been reported before, made with hundreds of partially calibrated, broken stalagmites (speleofacts) that appear to have been deliberately moved and placed in their current locations, along with the presence of several intentionally heated zones. Our results therefore suggest that the Neanderthal group responsible for these constructions had a level of social organization that was more complex than previously thought for this hominid species.
