= Mirabel, Tarn-et-Garonne =

Mirabel
- Commune
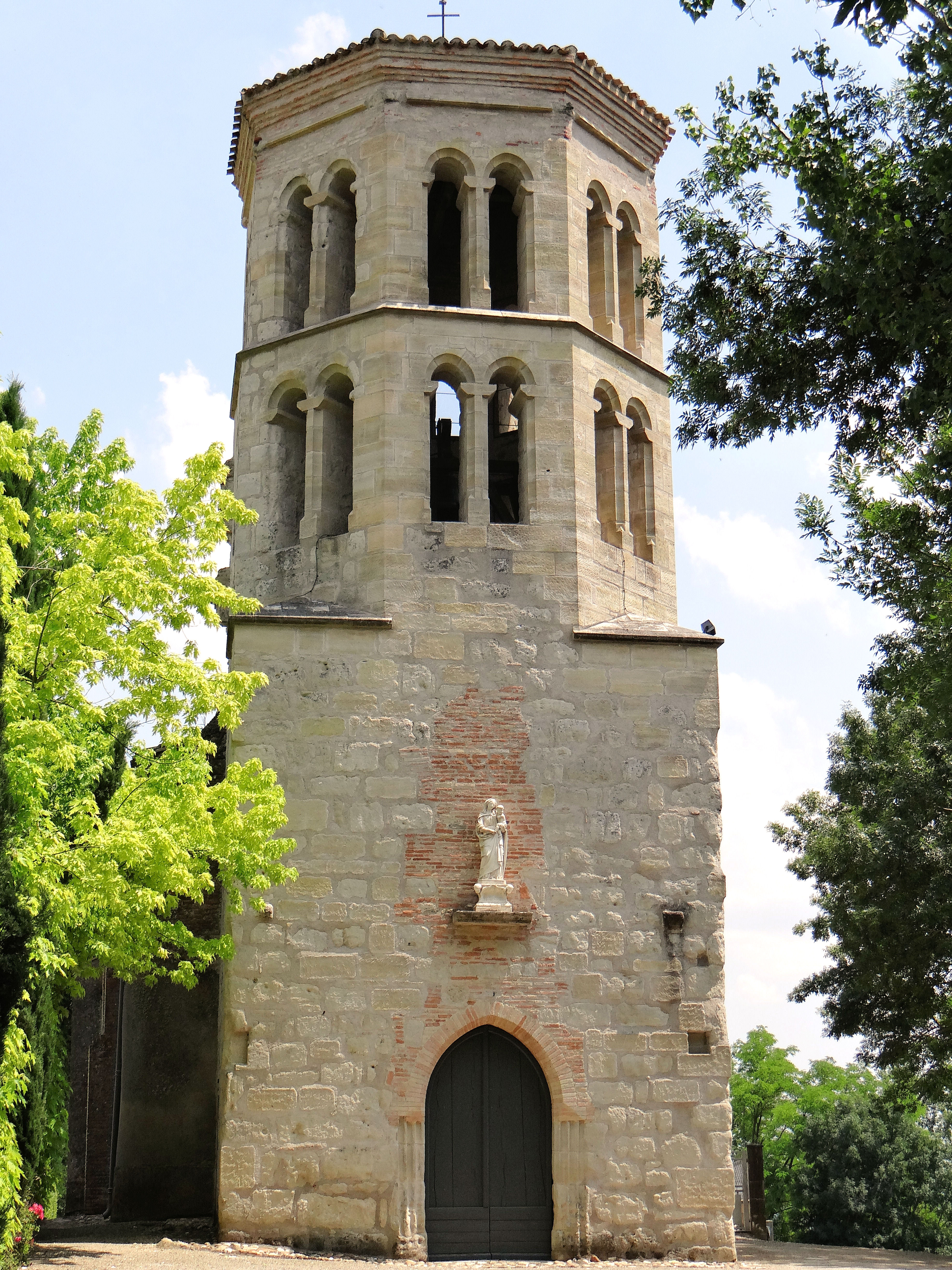
- The church of Notre-Dame-des Misères, in Mirabel

- Coat of arms
- Location of Mirabel
- Location within France Location within Occitanie
- Coordinates: 44°08′41″N 1°25′15″E
- Country: France
- Region: Occitania
- Department: Tarn-et-Garonne
- Arrondissement: Montauban
- Canton: Quercy-Aveyron
- Intercommunality: Quercy caussadais

Government
  - Mayor (2020–2026): Jacques Pautric
- Area^{1}: 32.07 km^{2} (12.38 sq mi)
- Elevation: 150 m (490 ft)
- Highest elevation: 217 m (712 ft)
- Lowest elevation: 79 m (259 ft)
- Population (2023): 1,045
  - Density: 32.58/km^{2} (84.39/sq mi)
- Time zone: UTC+01:00 (CET)
  - Summer (DST): UTC+02:00 (CEST)
- INSEE/Postal code: 82110 /82440
- ^{1} French Land Register data, which excludes lakes, ponds, glaciers > 1 km^{2} (0.386 sq mi or 247 acres) and river estuaries.

Mirabel (French pronunciation: [miʁabɛl]; Occitan: Mirabèl) is a commune in the Tarn-et-Garonne department in the Occitanie region in southern France.

== See also ==
- Communes of the Tarn-et-Garonne department
