= Cave of Mayrières supérieure =

Cave and archaeological site in France

- Grotte de Mayrière supérieure (French)
- Upper Mayriere Cave
- Location in France Cave of Mayrières supérieure (France)
- 44°2′22″N 1°41′3″E
- Location: near Bruniquel
- Region: Occitanie, France

The Cave of Mayrières supérieure (French: Grotte de Mayrières supérieure, English: Upper Mayriere Cave) is an archaeological site near Bruniquel, Tarn-et-Garonne, France, which contained two prehistoric cave paintings of bison until they were erased during an attempt to remove modern graffiti by members of the Eclaireurs de France, a French scouting association.

In March 1992, about 70 youth who belonged to the group descended on the cave with steel brushes to clean up graffiti. They damaged a portion of the cave's 15,000-year-old bison paintings before realizing what they were. René Gachet, director of cultural affairs for the Tarn-et-Garonne department, described the mistake as "absolutely stupid!"

The act earned them the 1992 Ig Nobel Prize in Archaeology.
