= Albias =

- Commune
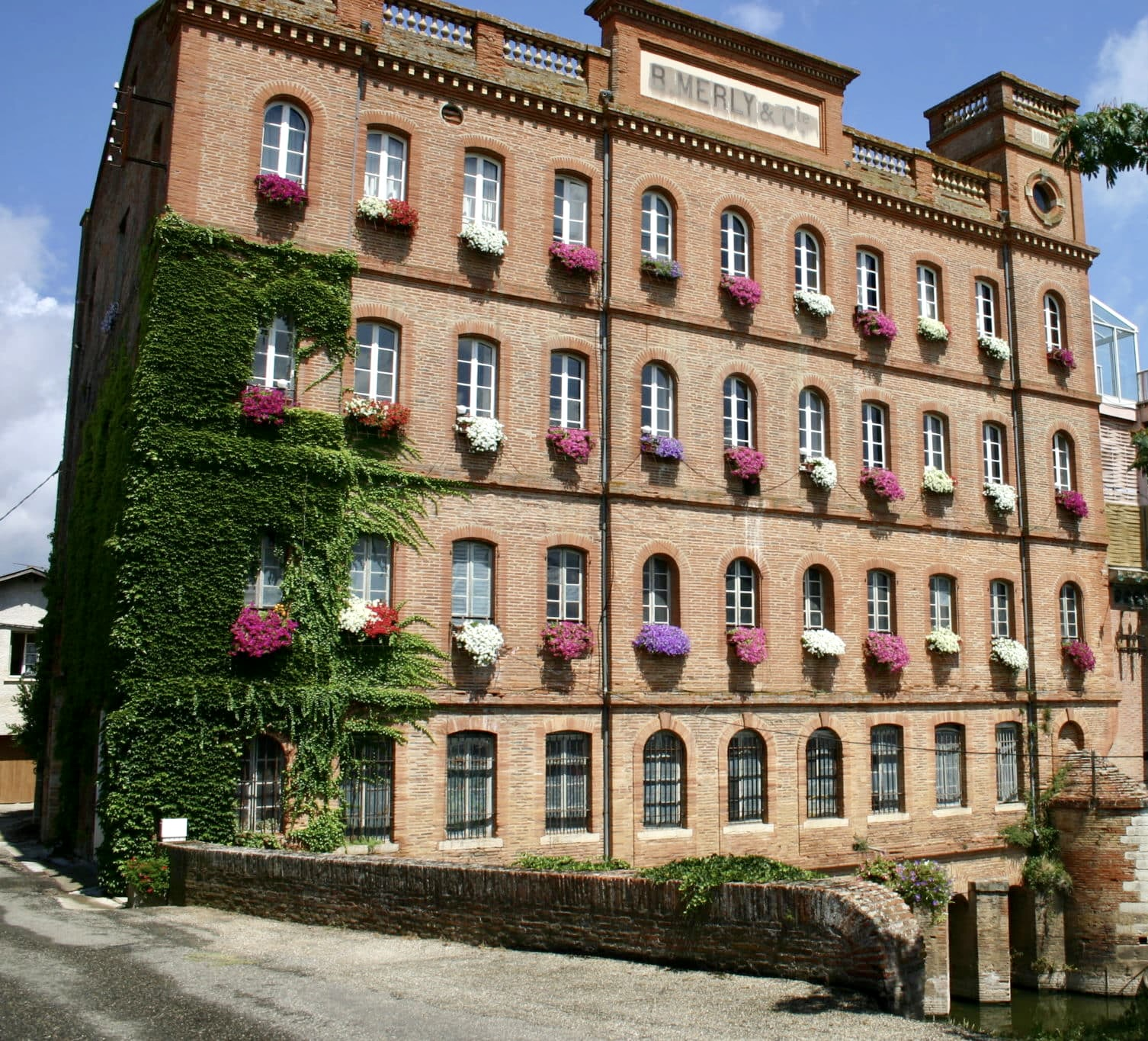

- Coat of arms
- Location of Albias
- Location within France Location within Occitanie
- Coordinates: 44°05′27″N 1°27′01″E
- Country: France
- Region: Occitania
- Department: Tarn-et-Garonne
- Arrondissement: Montauban
- Canton: Quercy-Aveyron
- Intercommunality: Quercy Vert-Aveyron

Government
  - Mayor (2020–2026): Véronique Magnani
- Area^{1}: 21.6 km^{2} (8.3 sq mi)
- Elevation: 91 m (299 ft)
- Highest elevation: 107 m (351 ft)
- Lowest elevation: 78 m (256 ft)
- Population (2023): 3,240
  - Density: 150/km^{2} (388/sq mi)
- Time zone: UTC+01:00 (CET)
  - Summer (DST): UTC+02:00 (CEST)
- INSEE/Postal code: 82002 /82350
- ^{1} French Land Register data, which excludes lakes, ponds, glaciers > 1 km^{2} (0.386 sq mi or 247 acres) and river estuaries.

Albias (French pronunciation: [albjas]; Occitan: Albiàs) is a commune in the Tarn-et-Garonne department in the Occitanie region in southern France.

== Population ==
Historical population
Year	Pop.	±% p.a.
1968	1,668	—
1975	1,888	+1.79%
1982	2,091	+1.47%
1990	2,313	+1.27%
1999	2,338	+0.12%
2007	2,608	+1.38%
2012	3,166	+3.95%
2017	3,246	+0.50%
2023	3,240	−0.03%
Source: INSEE

== See also ==
- Communes of the Tarn-et-Garonne department
