= Canton of Quercy-Aveyron =

Coordinates: 44.09°N 1.45°E

The canton of Quercy-Aveyron is an administrative division of the Tarn-et-Garonne department, in southern France. It was created at the French canton reorganisation which came into effect in March 2015. Its seat is in Albias.

It consists of the following communes:

1. Albias
2. Auty
3. Cayrac
4. L'Honor-de-Cos
5. Lamothe-Capdeville
6. Mirabel
7. Molières
8. Montalzat
9. Montastruc
10. Montfermier
11. Montpezat-de-Quercy
12. Piquecos
13. Réalville
14. Saint-Vincent-d'Autéjac
15. Villemade
