= L'Honor-de-Cos =

- Commune
- Location of L'Honor-de-Cos
- Location within France Location within Occitanie
- Coordinates: 44°07′23″N 1°20′56″E
- Country: France
- Region: Occitania
- Department: Tarn-et-Garonne
- Arrondissement: Montauban
- Canton: Quercy-Aveyron
- Intercommunality: CC du Pays de Lafrançaise

Government
  - Mayor (2020–2026): Michel Lamolinairie
- Area^{1}: 32.07 km^{2} (12.38 sq mi)
- Elevation: 190 m (620 ft)
- Highest elevation: 215 m (705 ft)
- Lowest elevation: 72 m (236 ft)
- Population (2023): 1,610
  - Density: 50.2/km^{2} (130/sq mi)
- Time zone: UTC+01:00 (CET)
  - Summer (DST): UTC+02:00 (CEST)
- INSEE/Postal code: 82076 /82130
- ^{1} French Land Register data, which excludes lakes, ponds, glaciers > 1 km^{2} (0.386 sq mi or 247 acres) and river estuaries.

Honor-de-Cos is a rural town with 1,600 inhabitants in 2020. It is part of the Montauban attraction area. Its inhabitants are called Honorois or Honoroises.

Honor-de-Cos is a French commune located in the center of the department of Tarn-et-Garonne, in the Occitanie region. On the historical and cultural level, the town is in the Quercy Blanc, corresponding to the southern part of Quercy, in front of its name with its lacustrine limestones of the Tertiary.

Exposed to an altered oceanic climate, it is drained by the Aveyron, the Rieutord, the Cantegrel stream, the Cardac stream, the Gesse stream and by various other small streams. The town has a remarkable natural heritage: a Natura 2000 site (The "valleys of the Tarn, Aveyron, Viaur, Agout and Gijou"), a protected area (the "course of the Garonne, 'Aveyron, Viaur and Tarn') and three natural areas of ecological, faunal and floristic interest.

== See also ==
- Communes of the Tarn-et-Garonne department
