= Saint-Vincent-d'Autéjac =

- Commune
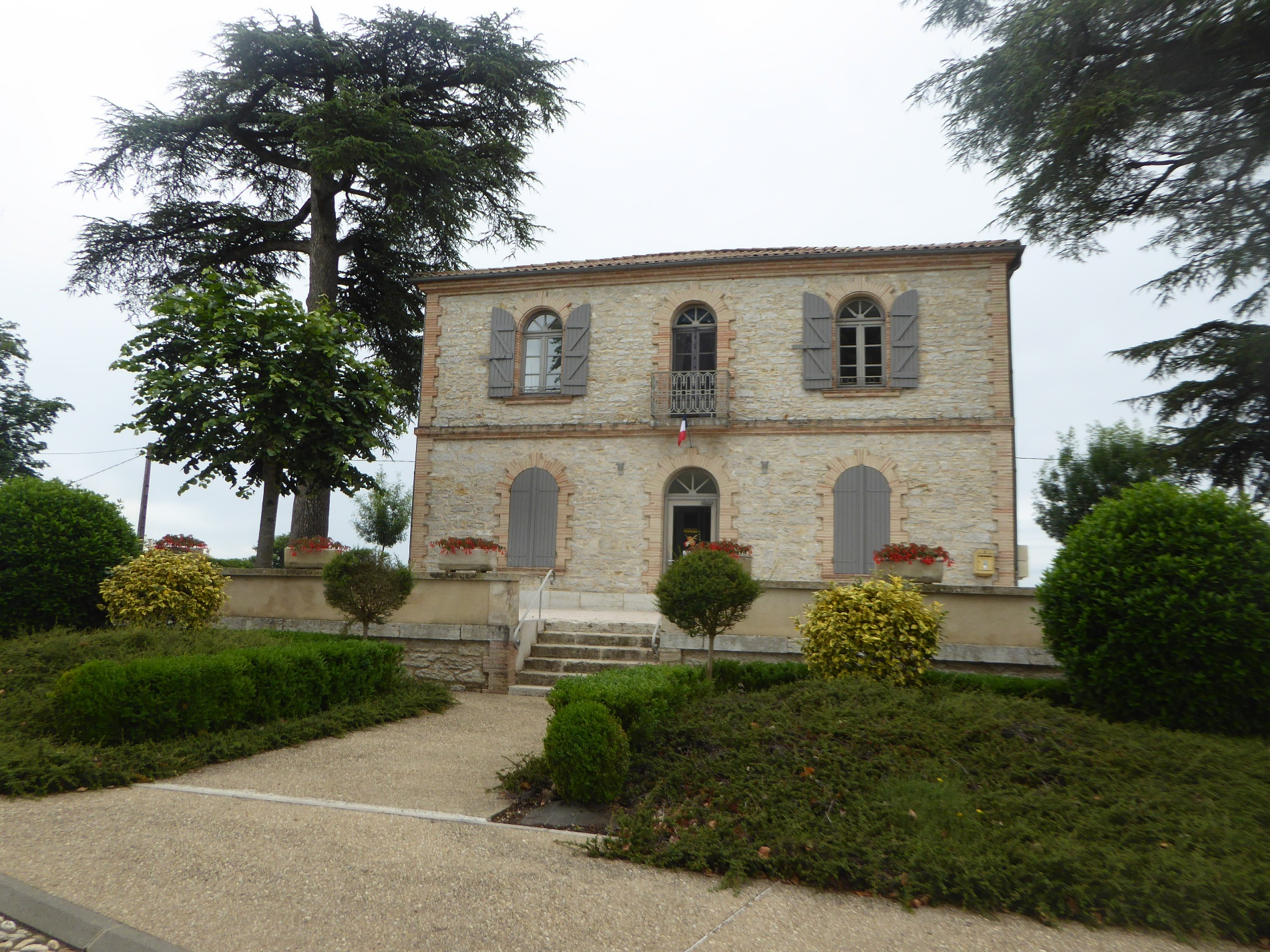
- Town hall
- Location of Saint-Vincent-d'Autéjac
- Location within France Location within Occitanie
- Coordinates: 44°09′42″N 1°28′20″E
- Country: France
- Region: Occitania
- Department: Tarn-et-Garonne
- Arrondissement: Montauban
- Canton: Quercy-Aveyron
- Intercommunality: Quercy caussadais

Government
  - Mayor (2020–2026): Nadine Quintard
- Area^{1}: 16.27 km^{2} (6.28 sq mi)
- Elevation: 203 m (666 ft)
- Highest elevation: 212 m (696 ft)
- Lowest elevation: 96 m (315 ft)
- Population (2023): 282
  - Density: 17.3/km^{2} (44.9/sq mi)
- Time zone: UTC+01:00 (CET)
  - Summer (DST): UTC+02:00 (CEST)
- INSEE/Postal code: 82174 /82300
- ^{1} French Land Register data, which excludes lakes, ponds, glaciers > 1 km^{2} (0.386 sq mi or 247 acres) and river estuaries.

Saint-Vincent-d'Autéjac (French pronunciation: [sɛ̃ vɛ̃sɑ̃ doteʒak]; before 2014: Saint-Vincent; Languedocien: Sent Vincent d'Antejac) is a commune in the Tarn-et-Garonne department in the Occitanie region in southern France.

== See also ==
- Communes of the Tarn-et-Garonne department
