= Montalzat =

- Commune
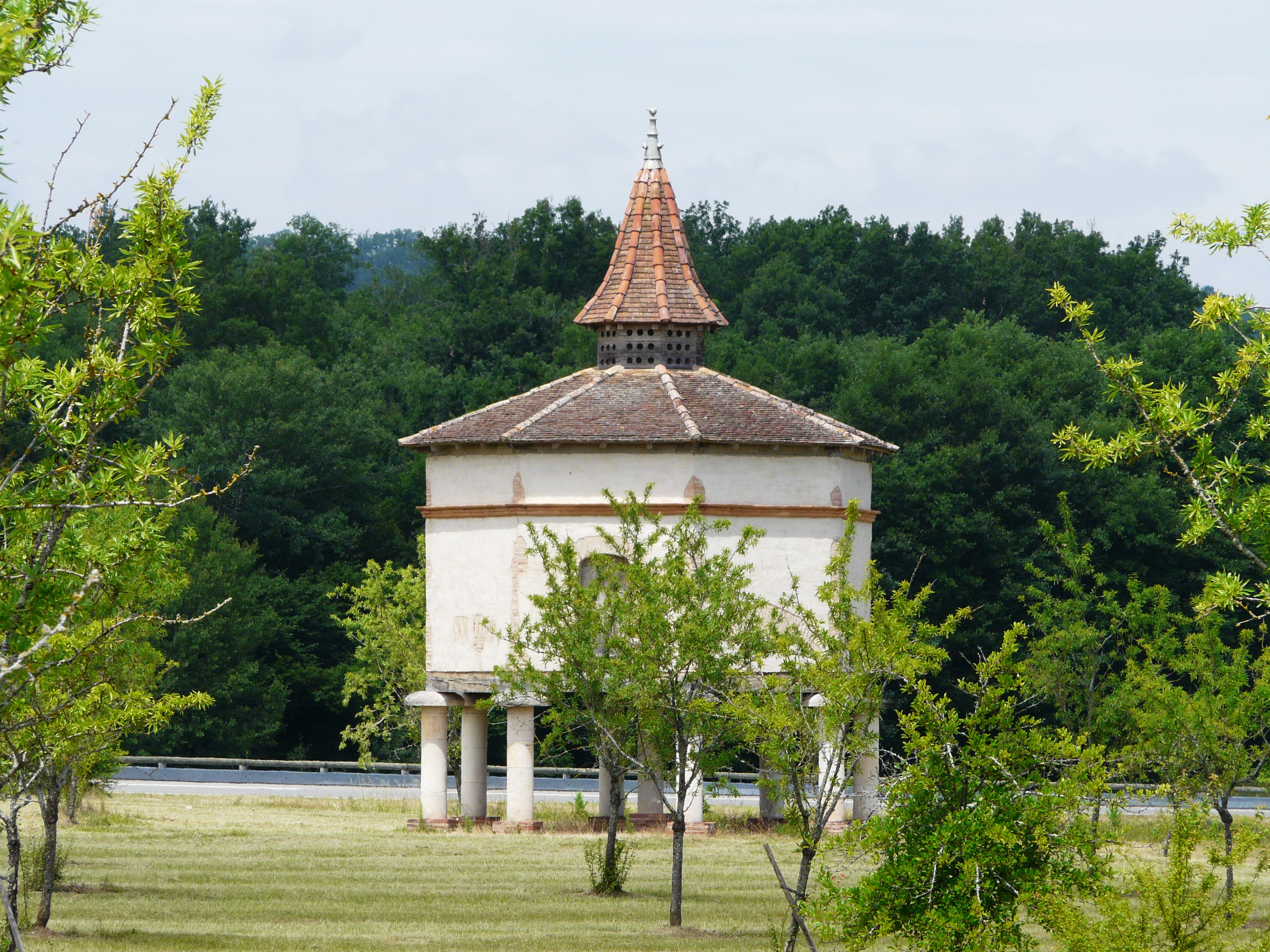
- The dovecote in Montalzat
- Location of Montalzat
- Location within France Location within Occitanie
- Coordinates: 44°12′33″N 1°30′02″E
- Country: France
- Region: Occitania
- Department: Tarn-et-Garonne
- Arrondissement: Montauban
- Canton: Quercy-Aveyron
- Intercommunality: Quercy caussadais

Government
  - Mayor (2020–2026): Jean-Claude Sicard
- Area^{1}: 27.5 km^{2} (10.6 sq mi)
- Elevation: 300 m (980 ft)
- Highest elevation: 306 m (1,004 ft)
- Lowest elevation: 115 m (377 ft)
- Population (2023): 663
  - Density: 24.1/km^{2} (62.4/sq mi)
- Time zone: UTC+01:00 (CET)
  - Summer (DST): UTC+02:00 (CEST)
- INSEE/Postal code: 82119 /82270
- ^{1} French Land Register data, which excludes lakes, ponds, glaciers > 1 km^{2} (0.386 sq mi or 247 acres) and river estuaries.

Montalzat (French pronunciation: [mɔ̃talza]; Occitan: Montalzac) is a commune in the Tarn-et-Garonne department in the Occitanie region in southern France.

== See also ==
- Communes of the Tarn-et-Garonne department
