= Piquecos =

- Commune
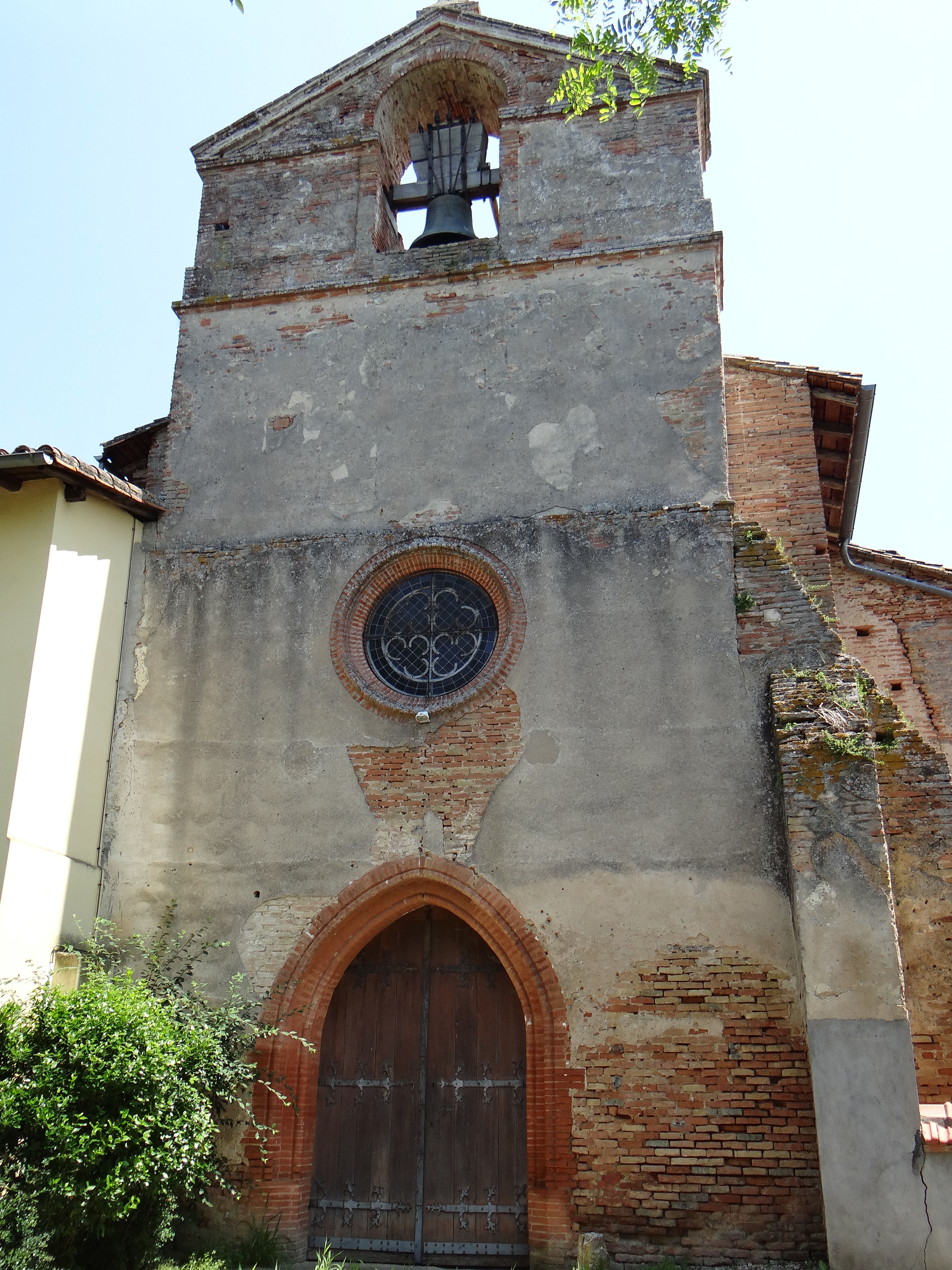
- The church of Saint-Félix, in Piquecos
- Location of Piquecos
- Location within France Location within Occitanie
- Coordinates: 44°06′01″N 1°19′18″E
- Country: France
- Region: Occitania
- Department: Tarn-et-Garonne
- Arrondissement: Montauban
- Canton: Quercy-Aveyron
- Intercommunality: CC du Pays de Lafrançaise

Government
  - Mayor (2020–2026): Christèle Garcia
- Area^{1}: 7.79 km^{2} (3.01 sq mi)
- Elevation: 300 m (980 ft)
- Highest elevation: 209 m (686 ft)
- Lowest elevation: 71 m (233 ft)
- Population (2023): 450
  - Density: 58/km^{2} (150/sq mi)
- Time zone: UTC+01:00 (CET)
  - Summer (DST): UTC+02:00 (CEST)
- INSEE/Postal code: 82140 /82130
- ^{1} French Land Register data, which excludes lakes, ponds, glaciers > 1 km^{2} (0.386 sq mi or 247 acres) and river estuaries.

Piquecos (French pronunciation: [pikəkɔs]; Occitan: Picacòs) is a commune in the Tarn-et-Garonne department in the Occitanie region in southern France.

== See also ==
- Communes of the Tarn-et-Garonne department
