= Cayrac =

- Commune
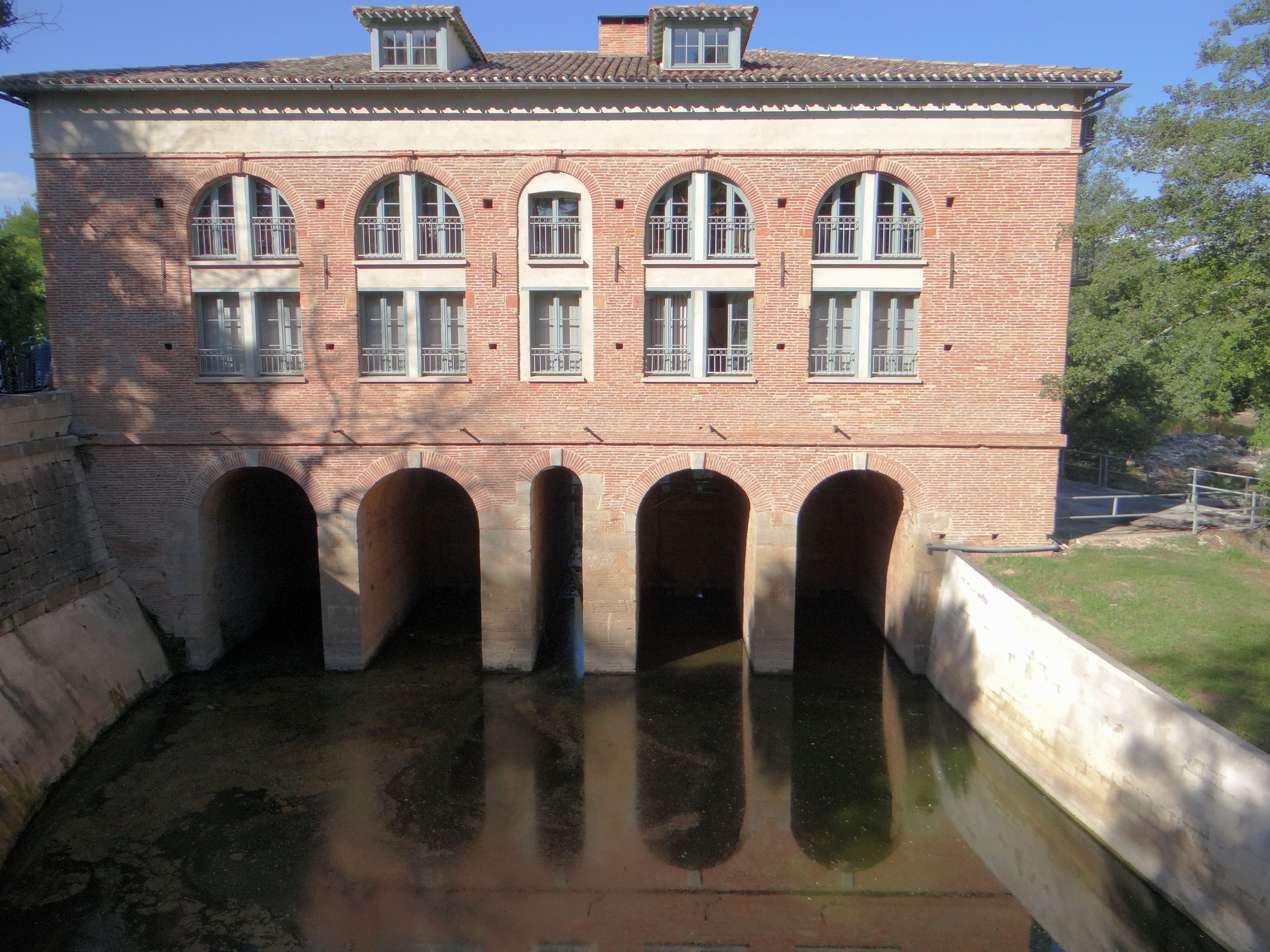
- The mill of Bellerive, in Cayrac
- Location of Cayrac
- Location within France Location within Occitanie
- Coordinates: 44°06′48″N 1°28′56″E
- Country: France
- Region: Occitania
- Department: Tarn-et-Garonne
- Arrondissement: Montauban
- Canton: Quercy-Aveyron
- Intercommunality: Quercy caussadais

Government
  - Mayor (2020–2026): Jacques Cousteils
- Area^{1}: 6.21 km^{2} (2.40 sq mi)
- Elevation: 80 m (260 ft)
- Highest elevation: 152 m (499 ft)
- Lowest elevation: 79 m (259 ft)
- Population (2023): 570
  - Density: 92/km^{2} (240/sq mi)
- Time zone: UTC+01:00 (CET)
  - Summer (DST): UTC+02:00 (CEST)
- INSEE/Postal code: 82039 /82440
- ^{1} French Land Register data, which excludes lakes, ponds, glaciers > 1 km^{2} (0.386 sq mi or 247 acres) and river estuaries.

Cayrac (French pronunciation: [kɛʁak]; Occitan: Cairac) is a commune in the Tarn-et-Garonne department in the Occitanie region in southern France.

== See also ==
- Communes of the Tarn-et-Garonne department
