= Molières, Tarn-et-Garonne =

Molières
- Commune
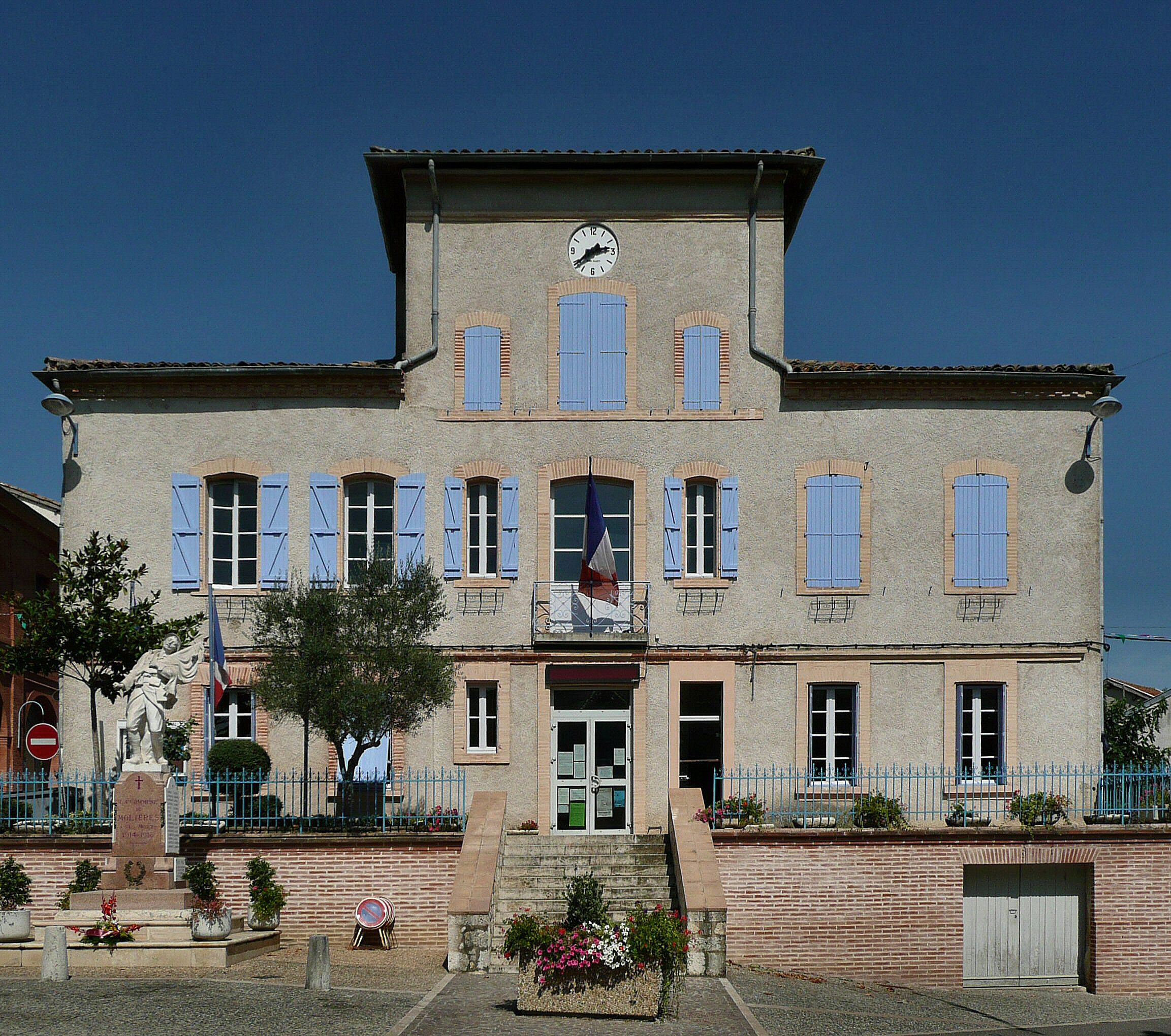
- The town hall of Molières

- Coat of arms
- Location of Molières
- Location within France Location within Occitanie
- Coordinates: 44°11′39″N 1°21′50″E
- Country: France
- Region: Occitania
- Department: Tarn-et-Garonne
- Arrondissement: Montauban
- Canton: Quercy-Aveyron
- Intercommunality: Quercy caussadais

Government
  - Mayor (2020–2026): Valérie Hebral
- Area^{1}: 38.46 km^{2} (14.85 sq mi)
- Elevation: 176 m (577 ft)
- Highest elevation: 223 m (732 ft)
- Lowest elevation: 102 m (335 ft)
- Population (2023): 1,273
  - Density: 33.10/km^{2} (85.73/sq mi)
- Time zone: UTC+01:00 (CET)
  - Summer (DST): UTC+02:00 (CEST)
- INSEE/Postal code: 82113 /82220
- ^{1} French Land Register data, which excludes lakes, ponds, glaciers > 1 km^{2} (0.386 sq mi or 247 acres) and river estuaries.

Molières (French pronunciation: [mɔljɛʁ]; Occitan: Molièras) is a commune in the Tarn-et-Garonne department in the Occitanie region in southern France.

== History ==
The first traces of occupation on the site of Molière date to the early Christian era. Cadurques, Gallic people of the Quercy, choose the site for its elevated position overlooking the Lemboulas and Petit Lembous valleys, which are easily defensible. The Roman occupation and the period of prosperity that accompanies it promote trade and open channels of communication . " Moleriis " is on the road between Tolosa (Toulouse) and Divona (Cahors).

After many centuries of unrest and insecurity during the period of the "Great Invasions", the beginning of the twelfth century marks the return of prosperity for Molière . The fertile lands provide grain, the many mills that line the streams, produce beautiful flour.

Religiously depending on the high priest of St. Vincent de Flaugnac, Molière's Ratier lord of Castelnau. It is in 1263 that people get permission to build a church dedicated to the Virgin ("Beata Maria Molieriis").

In May 1270, Alphonse de Poitiers, brother of Saint Louis, grants Molière a Charter of Customs, thus founding the fourteenth century Bastide Quercy. By new statutes, the village is protected by lordly power, placed under the authority of Bayle (representing the royal authority), accompanied by six consuls elected annually among the inhabitants . The Charter of Customs guarantees freedom of individuals, the protection of property and free bequest of such property. Each resident must participate in the defense of the Bastide, every man is obliged to provide military service for forty days. New residents arrive and from 1338, the Bastide inhabits the highest part of the hill, protected by a wall and a watchtower (which dominate the village until 1993). These defenses quickly become useful because the Black Death of 1348 arrives from the Languedoc, and the Anglo-French Hundred Years' War begins. In 1360, the Quercy is under English control, and Molière under French control, remained the northern boundary of the County of Toulouse. Molières lives behind its walls until the end of the war in 1450. It is from this date that Molière finds prosperity and becomes in 1573 a Royal City. But this period is no less eventful. From 1562, Catholics and Protestants clash in the region. The church outside the walls will be attacked and destroyed in 1567. It will be rebuilt at the beginning of the seventeenth century.

The constant desire of people to better control their future, the quality and dedication of their consuls are rewarded in 1696 when Molière becomes the fourteenth city Quercy to send deputies to the Provincial States. In the early eighteenth century, the growth of the city and its rich bourgeoisie become the center of an important trade network. However, this prosperity based on an agricultural economy, which is thwarted from 1785 to 1788 by major droughts followed by harsh winters.

The 1789 revolution and its attendant violence causes many problems in the city and Molière pays dearly as a royal city: its walls are destroyed, the bells melted to make cannons. It is not until the arrival of the Empire that passions subside.

Molière becomes the centre of six parishes (Molière, Espanel Saint Amans, Saint Arthémie, Saint Kitts and Saint Nazaire) initially in the department of Lot, it changes with the creation of the department of Tarn et Garonne in 1808 by imperial decree of Napoleon. Molière is the capital of rural townships consisting of Auty, Labarthe, and Puycornet Vazerac. With the economic and demographic expansion of the nineteenth century, the village extends along the communication path between Montauban and Cahors (the current main street Avenue de Larche ). The church is in disrepair and becomes too cramped to accommodate all the faithful, it will be completely rebuilt on the site of the cemetery (the latter will be transferred out of the village to Labarthe road). Opened in late 1898, of the original building, only the clock tower remains, now separate from the church. In 1900, a new church square is built, plus a hall for poultry and an area for unloading. From this date, the carts do not have to mount the steep road which leads to the square of the old city. It soon become useless due to loss of markets, the hall will be demolished in the 1980s while the site will be redesigned in 2009.

The twentieth century will be marked by the end of the First World War, and a massive rural exodus that emptied the town of half its inhabitants. From the late 1980s, the trend finally reverses while Molière modernizes and turns to tourism with the construction of a leisure center, around a lake of 10 ha.

== See also ==
- Communes of the Tarn-et-Garonne department
