= Swimming Reindeer =

Paleolithic ivory sculpture

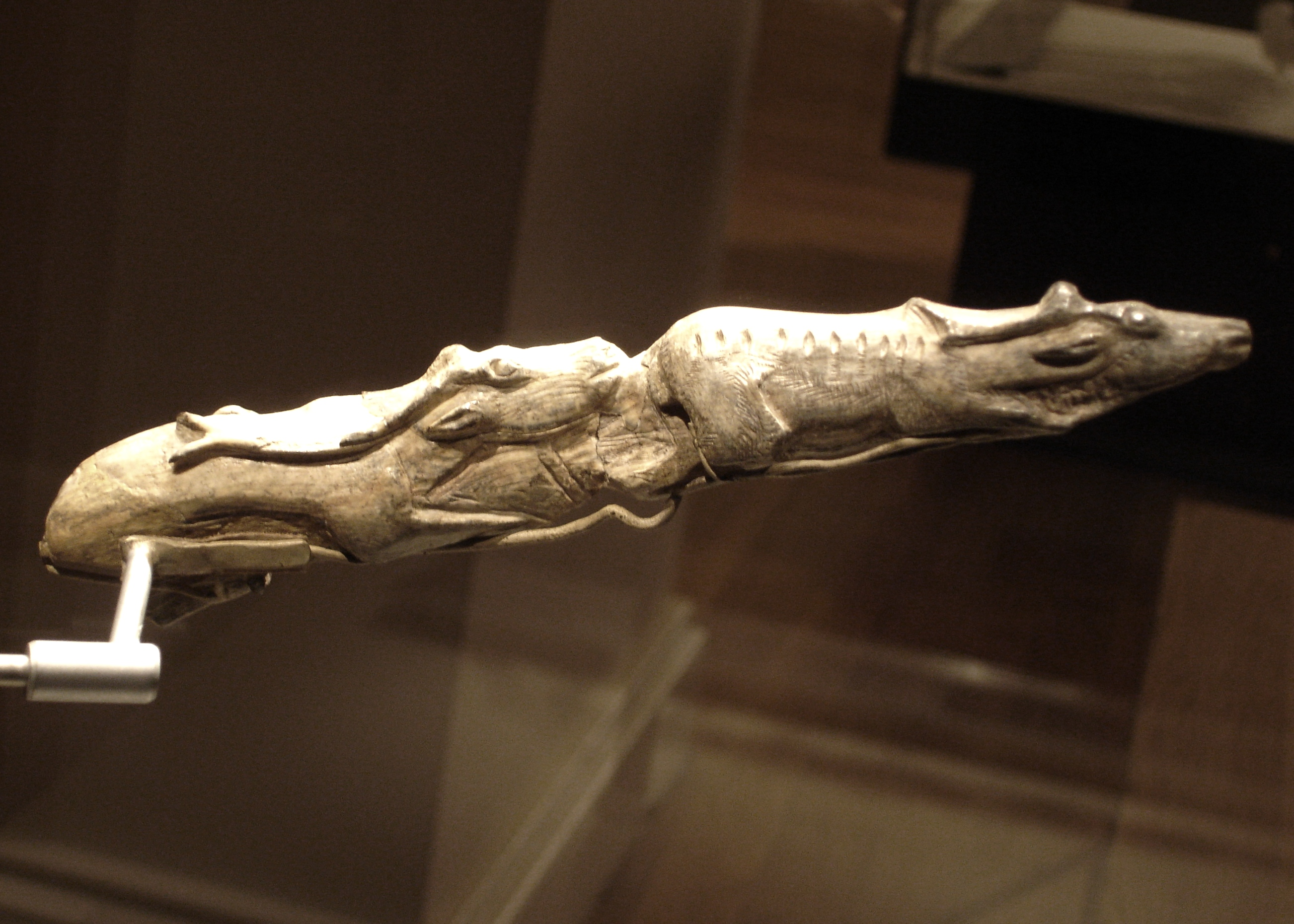
- The 13,000-year-old Swimming Reindeer sculpture
- Material: Mammoth ivory
- Size: 207 mm long
- Created: 13,000 years ago
- Discovered: Bruniquel, France
- Present location: British Museum, London
- Registration: Palart.550

The Swimming Reindeer is a 13,000-year-old Magdalenian sculpture of two swimming reindeer conserved in the British Museum. The sculpture was made in what is now modern-day France by an unknown sculptor who carved the artwork from the tip of a mammoth tusk. The sculpture was found in two pieces in 1866, but it was not until 1904 that Abbé Henri Breuil realised that the two pieces fit together to form a single artwork of two reindeer swimming nose-to-tail.

== Discovery ==
The pieces of the sculpture were discovered by a French engineer, Peccadeau de l’Isle, in 1866 while he was trying to find evidence of early man on the banks of the River Aveyron, although contemporary accounts attributed the find to Victor Brun, a local antiquarian. At the time, de l'Isle was employed in the construction of a railway line from Montauban to Rodez, and while digging for artefacts in his spare time he found some prehistoric flint tools and several examples of late Ice Age prehistoric art in a rock shelter of Bruniquel. The finds took the name of the rock shelter : "abri Montastruc" (Montastruc rock shelter). The hill was estimated to be 98 feet (30 m) high, and the artefacts were found beneath an overhang that extended for about 46 feet (14 m) along the river and enclosed an area of 298 square yards (249 m^{2}). De l'Isle had to dig through 7 metres (23 ft) of material to get to the level where the artefacts were found. At this time it was thought that there were two separate carvings of reindeer as it was not obvious that the two pieces fitted together.

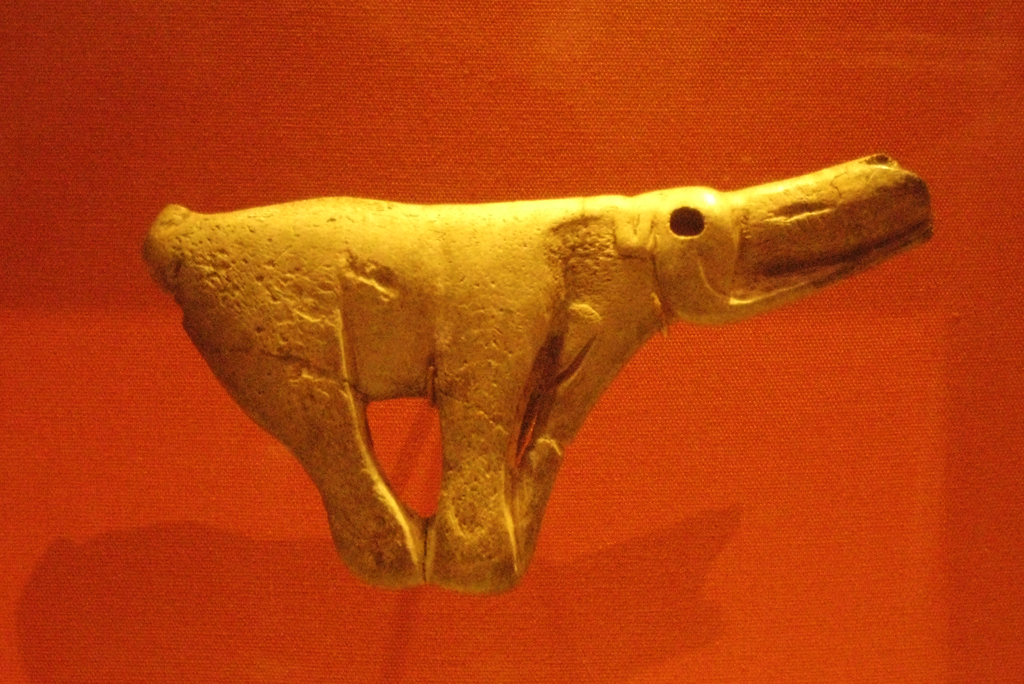
The Mammoth spear thrower

De l'Isle wrote a paper on his discovery, and his finds were exhibited in 1867 at the Exposition Universelle in Paris. People were intrigued to see the sophistication of his finds and this sculpture in particular. The carvings were remarkable in that they illustrate reindeer, which no longer live in France. Dating was possible as the two reindeer were carved in the ivory of an extinct animal. This dated the find as ancient and required a re-evaluation of the life of humans in the late Ice Age. This find was particularly astounding, as at that time no cave paintings had been discovered, and it was to be some years before those that were found were accepted as genuine. In fact it was only the work of Henry Christy and Edouard Lartet that had recently persuaded informed opinion that mankind had lived during the ice age and coexisted with mammoths.

The evidence for coexistence came not only from the reindeer but also from a carved spear thrower which was found in the same location. This device was used to gain extra leverage when throwing a spear. In this case it was made from a piece of reindeer antler that had been carved into the shape of a mammoth.

The reindeer sculptures were again exhibited in 1884 in Toulouse, when it is speculated that a French buyer might have been found, but they were eventually procured by the British Museum in 1887. De l'Isle initially offered his finds to the British Museum for the large sum of 150,000 francs, which would have a value in excess of half a million pounds in 2010. The offer was considered much too high and was not accepted by Augustus Franks, an enthusiastic antiquarian who was in charge of the north European collection at that time. Franks had been known to fund the museum's acquisitions himself, and he sent Charles Hercules Read to negotiate with de l'Isle. Read successfully managed to bring the price down to £500 (about £30,000 today). The purchase was funded by the Christy Fund, a £5,000 bequest by Henry Christy who had also left his own collections to the museum.

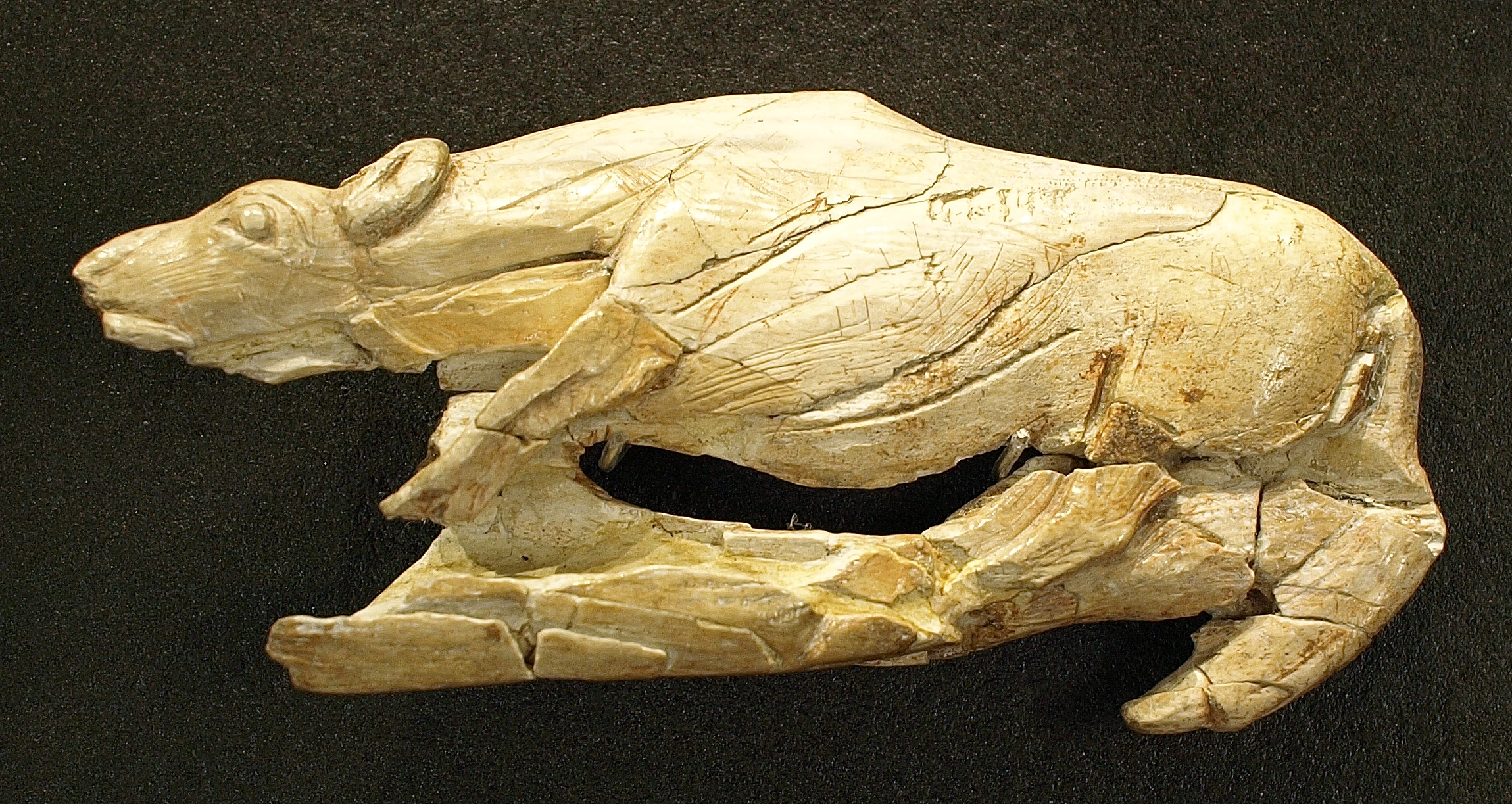
Rampant Hyena carving found at Abri de la Madeleine, also in France

It was not until 1904 when Abbé Breuil saw the sculptures whilst visiting the British Museum that he realised that the two pieces fitted together, and were in fact two parts of a single sculpture.

The sculpture is kept in a controlled atmosphere and is rarely moved. The ivory is now very fragile and it is feared that it could "turn to dust" if it were treated roughly. Unlike the mammoth spear thrower, the reindeer sculpture has no practical purpose, and is considered to be the oldest piece of art in any British museum.

== Age ==
The finds came from the late Ice Age, which Henry Christy and Edouard Lartet originally called the "age of the reindeer". That is notable as the carving of mammoth ivory depicted reindeer and the mammoth spear thrower was carved from a reindeer antler. That fixes the co-existence of reindeer, mammoths and man at a time that the area had a climate similar to that of Siberia today.

Later, this period became known as Magdalenian, named after a French cave, Abri de la Madeleine, where similar art to the Swimming Reindeer were found.

== Appearance ==
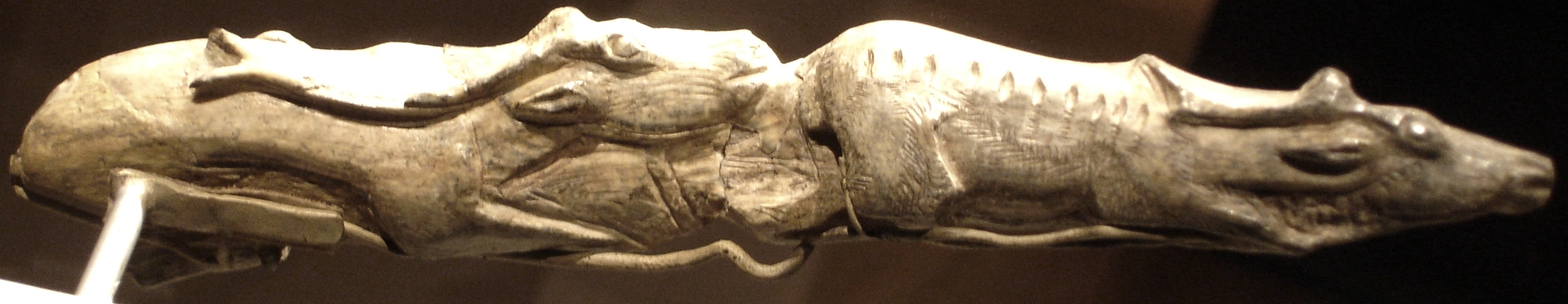
The male reindeer is on the left, the female is to the right.

The sculpture shows a female reindeer closely followed by a larger male reindeer. The larger male is indicated by his size, antlers and genitals, whilst the female has her teats modelled. The reindeer are thought to be swimming in illustration of the migration of deer that would have taken place each autumn. It is known that it would be autumn as both reindeer are shown with antlers, and only during autumn do both male and female reindeer have antlers. At this time of year reindeer would be much easier to hunt, and the meat, skin and antlers would be at their best. Each of the reindeer has been marked with a burin to show different colouring and texture in the deer's coat. Oddly there are ten deeper cuts on each side of the back of the leading female reindeer. These may have been intended to indicate coloured markings, but their purpose is unclear.

Former Director of the British Museum Neil MacGregor says of the manufacturing process:

If you look closely, you can see that this little sculpture is the result, in fact, of four separate stone technologies. First, the tip of the tusk was severed with a chopping tool; then the contours of the animals were whittled with a stone knife and scraper. Then the whole thing was polished using a powdered iron oxide mixed with water, probably buffed up with a chamois leather. And finally the markings on the bodies and the details of the eyes were carefully incised with a stone engraving tool. In execution as well as in conception, this is a very complex work of art. And it seems to me that it has all the qualities of precise observation and interpretation that you'd look for in any great artist.

== Gallery ==
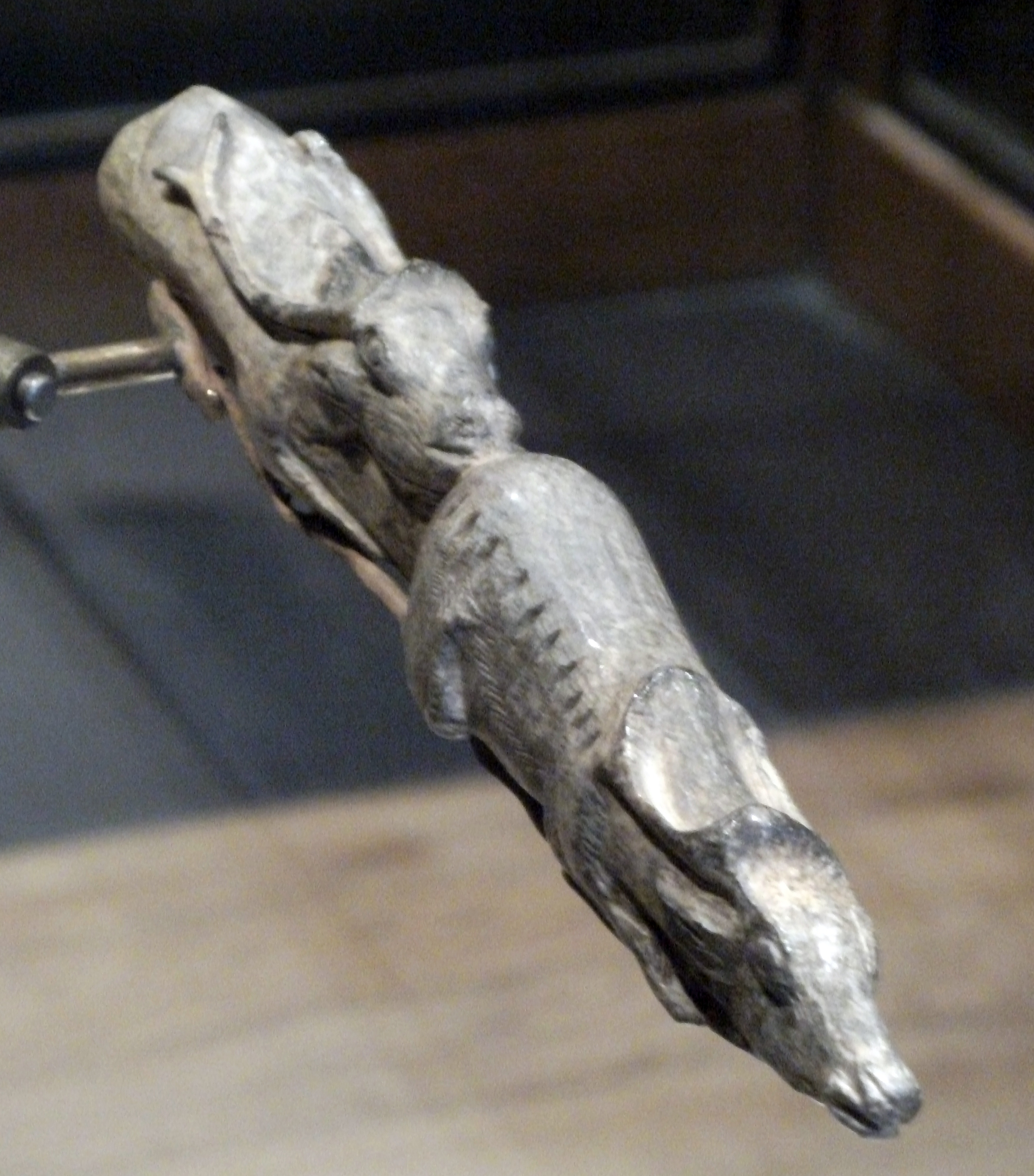

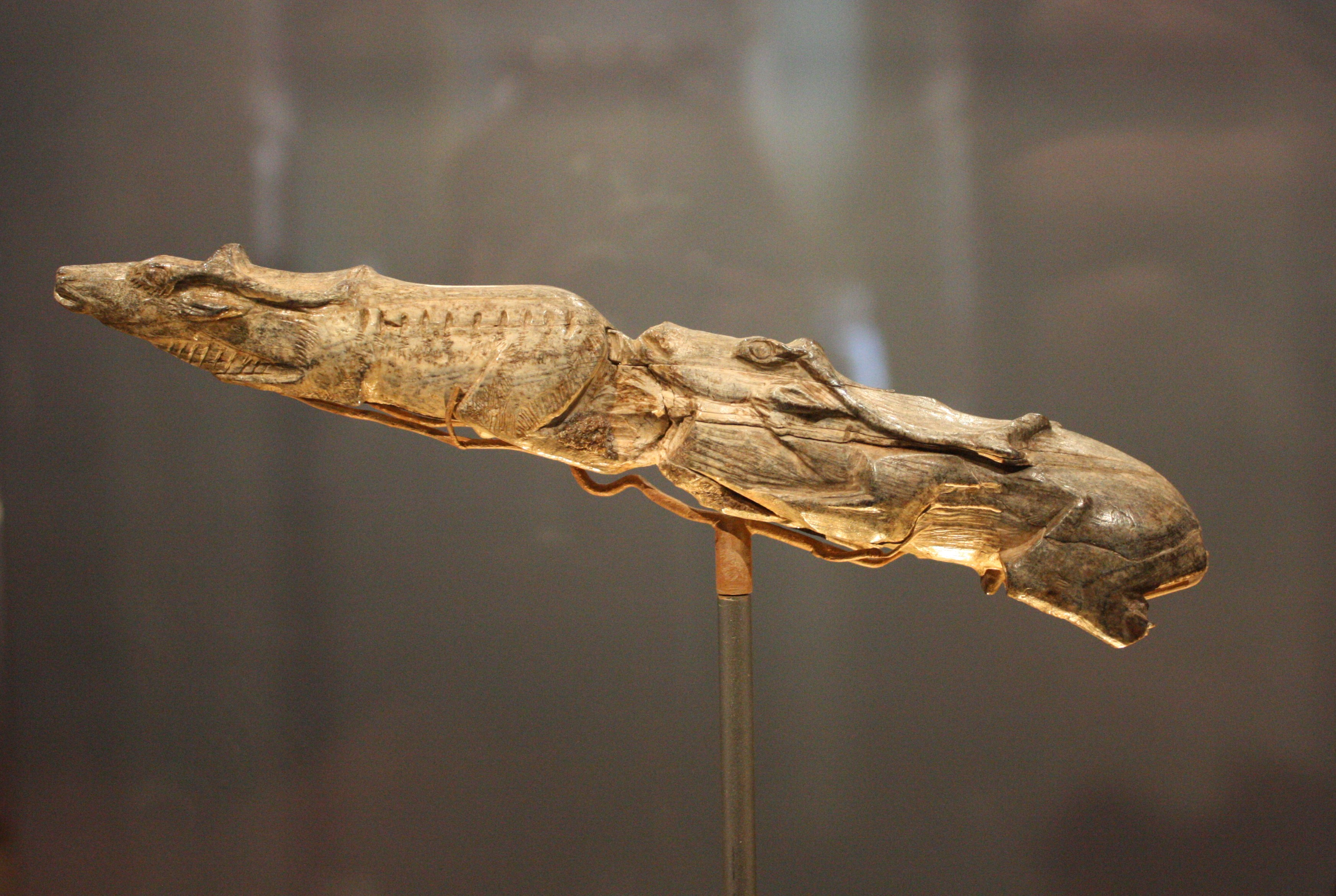

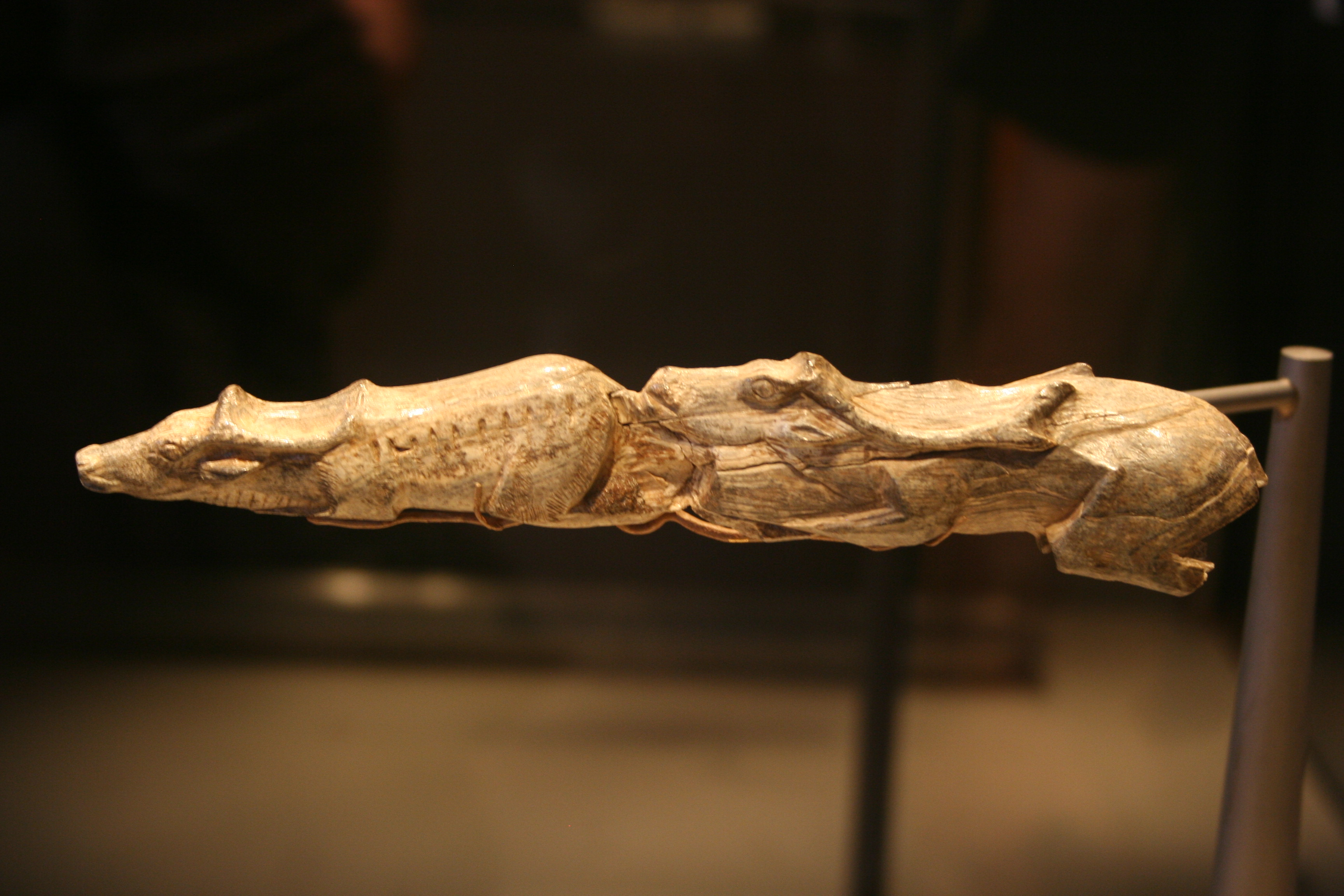

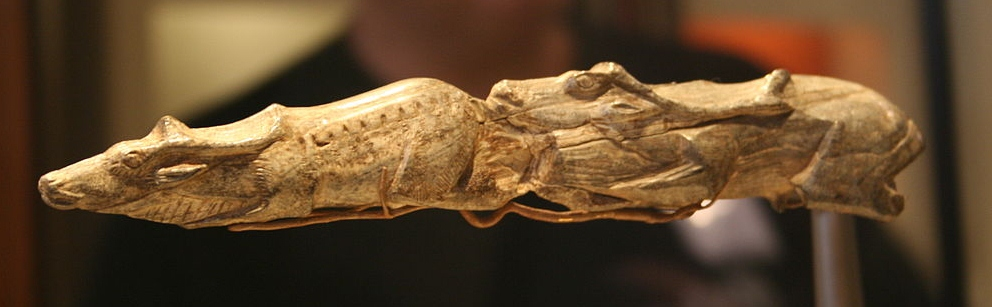

== History of the World in 100 Objects ==
This sculpture was chosen as object 4 in the History of the World in 100 Objects. This was a series of radio programmes created in a partnership between the BBC and the British Museum.

== See also ==
- Art of the Upper Paleolithic
- List of Stone Age art

== Bibliography ==
- The Swimming Reindeer, Jill Cook, 2010, British Museum Objects in Focus series, ISBN 978-0-7141-2821-4.

| Preceded by 3: Handaxe | A History of the World in 100 Objects; Object 4 | Succeeded by 5: Clovis Point |
