= Alzou (Aveyron) =

River in southern France

- Location within France Location within Occitanie

Location
- Country: France

Physical characteristics
- Mouth
  - location: Aveyron
  - coordinates: 44°21′1″N 2°2′34″E
- Length: 43.9 km (27.3 mi)

Basin features
- Progression: Aveyron→ Tarn→ Garonne→ Gironde estuary→ Atlantic Ocean

The Alzou (French pronunciation: [alzu]) is a 43.9 km (27.3 mi) river in the Aveyron department in southern France. It is a right tributary of the Aveyron. Its source is in Goutrens. It flows into the Aveyron in Villefranche-de-Rouergue.
