= Mammoth spear thrower =

Prehistoric spear thrower found in France

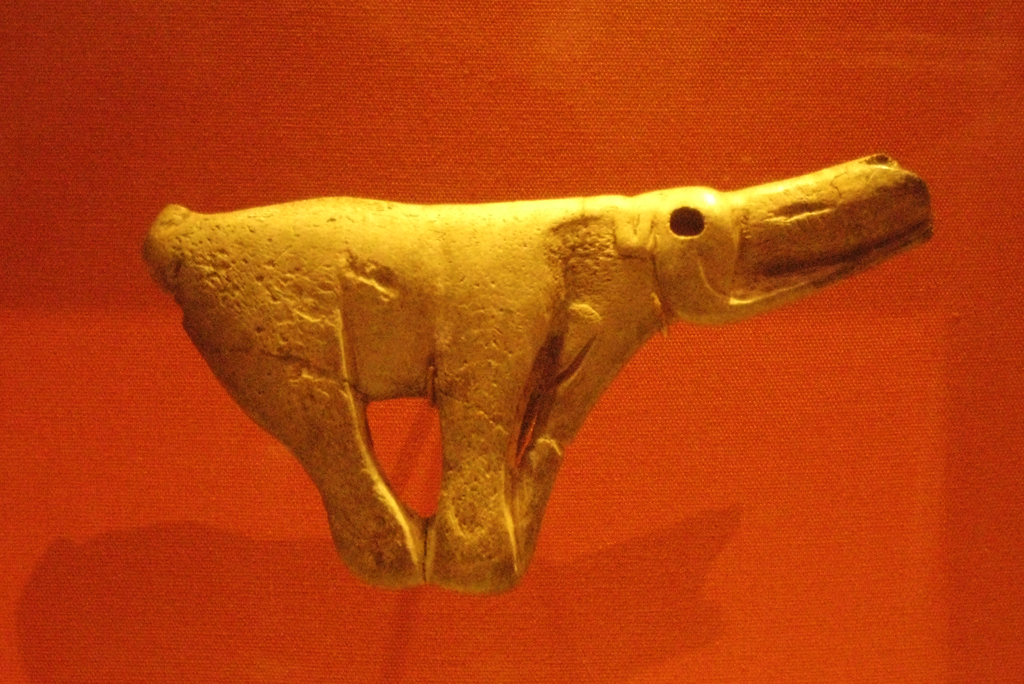
- The Mammoth spear thrower in the British Museum
- Material: Antler
- Size: Length: 12 cm
- Created: 12,500 years
- Discovered: Before 2013; Bruniquel, Tarn-et-Garonne, France
- Present location: London, England, United Kingdom
- Registration: Palart 551

The Mammoth spear thrower is a spear thrower in the form of a mammoth, discovered at the "Montastruc rock shelter" in Bruniquel, France. It is from the late Magdalenian period and around 12,500 years old. It now forms part of the Christy Collection in the British Museum (Palart 551), and is normally on display in Room 2. Between 7 February – 26 May 2013 it was displayed in the exhibition at the British Museum Ice Age Art: Arrival of the Modern Mind.

== Features ==
The spear thrower was carved from a reindeer antler and depicts a mammoth with a hole for an eye which probably held a bone or stone insert originally. The hook has been repaired after the antler from which it was carved broke. The tusks of the mammoth appear on each side but have mostly been lost due to damage. It is about 12 cm in length.

The mammoth is produced in low-relief on both sides of the object. When it was discovered, the broken tail hook had already been repaired. This was achieved by drilling a hole through the mammoth shape, just in front of the broken hook - and inserting in another piece of antler.

Spear throwers were first used in western Europe around 20,000 years ago and enabled hunters to launch spears with more force and speed than if they threw just by hand. It was common for them to be decorated with animal carvings.

Other types of spear throwers include the perforated batons, which are also often decorated. An example from La Madeleine can be seen at the British Museum in Room 2.

== See also ==
- Prehistoric art
- Swimming Reindeer (Palart 550) from the same site
- List of Stone Age art
- Art of the Upper Paleolithic
