= Jacques Jaubert =

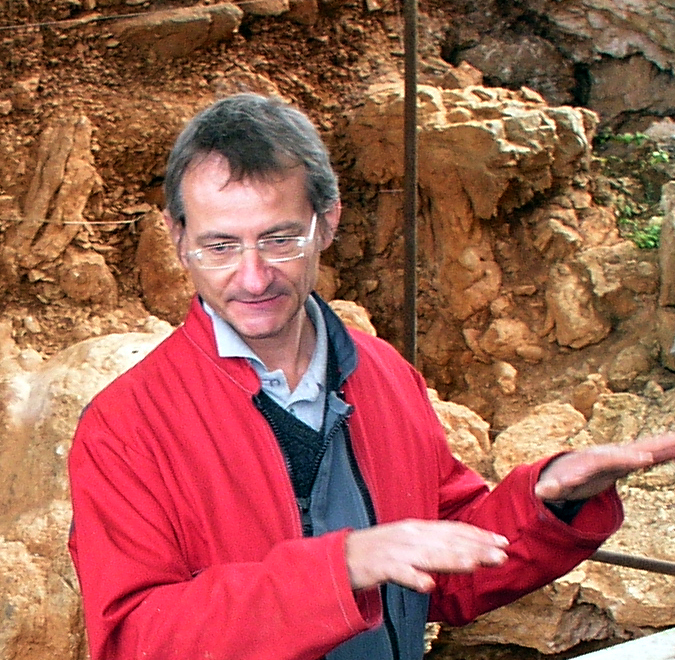
Jacques Jaubert

Jacques Jaubert (born 26 July 1957) is a French prehistorian and professor of Paleolithic archaeology at the University of Bordeaux.

== Academic career ==
He obtained his MA and PhD at University of Paris 1 Pantheon-Sorbonne. He obtained his Habilitation à Diriger des Recherches (HDR) in 2000 at University of Toulouse-Le Mirail with a thesis entitled Middle Paleolithic and Early Upper Palaeolithic in Southwestern Europe and Northeastern Asia. He is a member of the editorial boards of a number of international journals, including Archaeology, Ethnology, and Anthropology of Eurasia.

== Research ==
The majority of Jaubert's studies have been centered around Middle Paleolithic and Neanderthals in southwestern Europe and western Asia. He has been the director or co-director of a number of archaeological projects in France, including Quercy (Coudoulous, Espagnac) and Saintonge (Jonzac), Mongolia (Aimak of Hovd in Mongolian Altai), Iran (Mar Tarik cave and Qaleh Bozi Cave) and Armenia. He has also published many scholarly papers, co-edited books and a written book about Neanderthals for general readers in 1999.

== Teaching activities ==
Jaubert is the co-director of the master of biological anthropology and prehistory program at the University of Bordeaux.

== Selected publications ==
- Jaubert Jacques, Biglari Feiredoun, Crassard Rémy, Mashkour Marjan, Rendu William et Shidrang Sonia (2010).Paléolithique moyen récent de la grotte de Qaleh Bozi 2 (Ispahan, Iran) : premiers résultats de la campagne 2008. Iranian Archaeology, vol. 1, N° 1, p. 21-31.
- Jaubert J., Biglari F., Mourre V., Bruxelles L., Bordes J.-G., Shidrang S., Naderi R., Mashkour M., Maureille, B., Mallye J.-B., Quinif Y., Rendu W., Laroulandie V. (2009) The Middle Palaeolithic occupation of MarTarik, a new Zagros Mousterian site in Bisotun Massif (Kermanshah, Iran). - In : Otte M., Biglari F., Jaubert J.(eds.), Iran Palaeolithic. - Actes du XVe Congrès de l’UISPP, Lisbonne, septembre 2006, Session C15. - Oxford : Archaeopress, p. 7-27. - (BAR International Series; 1968)
- Otte M., Biglari F., Jaubert J., éds. (2009) - Iran Palaeolithic. - Actes du XVè Congrès de l’UISPP, Lisbonne, septembre 2006, Session C15. - Oxford : Archaeopress. - (BAR International Series; 1968)
- Cleyet-Merle J.-J., Jaubert J., Vandermeersch B. (2008) - Conclusion. - In : Vandermeersch B., Cleyet-Merle, J.-J., Jaubert J., Maureille B., Turq A. (éds), Première Humanité, gestes funéraires des Néandertaliens. -Catalogue d’exposition, Musée National de Préhistoire, Les Eyzies-de-Tayac. - Paris : Réunion des Musées Nationaux, p. 128.
- Jaubert J. (2008) - Quels peuplements avant l’Aurignacien sur le versant nord des Pyrénées ? Qui est l’Aurignacien ? - Actes du Colloque d'Aurignac, 20-21 septembre 2003. - Aurignac : Édition Musée-forum, p. 9-25. - (Cahier; 3)
- Jaubert J. et Maureille B. (2008) - Les dents humaines moustériennes du Rescoundudou (SébazacConcourès, Aveyron). - Bulletin de la Société préhistorique française, t. 105, n° 4, p. 677-690.
- Jaubert J. 1999 Chasseurs et artisans du Moustérien. : La Maison des Roches Editeurs, Collection « Histoire de la France préhistorique de −250 000 à 30 000 ans », Paris
- Jaubert, J., P. H. Giscard, Z. Batsaikhan, D. Erdenebaatar, and C. Servelle. 1997. Contribution a la connaissance du Paléolithique de Mongolie: étude des sites de L’Aimak de Hovd (Altai Mongol). L’Anthropologie 101(3): 419-447.
