= Bruniquel =

- Commune
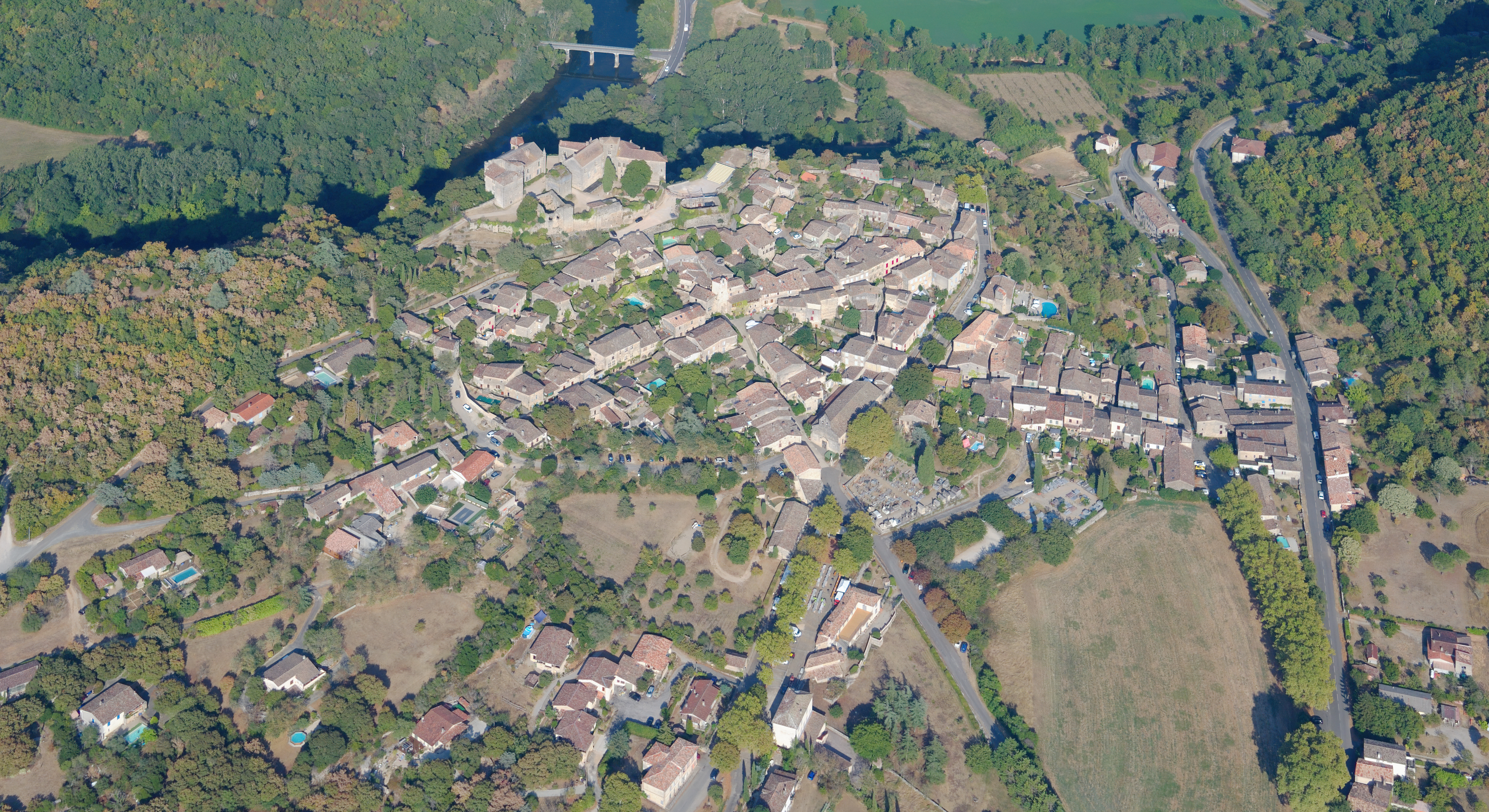
- Aerial view of Bruniquel

- Coat of arms
- Location of Bruniquel
- Location within France Location within Occitanie
- Coordinates: 44°03′24″N 1°39′59″E
- Country: France
- Region: Occitania
- Department: Tarn-et-Garonne
- Arrondissement: Montauban
- Canton: Tarn-Tescou-Quercy vert
- Intercommunality: CC Quercy Vert-Aveyron

Government
  - Mayor (2020–2026): Christiane Soulie
- Area^{1}: 33.2 km^{2} (12.8 sq mi)
- Elevation: 130 m (430 ft)
- Highest elevation: 382 m (1,253 ft)
- Lowest elevation: 90 m (300 ft)
- Population (2023): 641
  - Density: 19.3/km^{2} (50.0/sq mi)
- Demonym: Bruniquelais
- Time zone: UTC+01:00 (CET)
  - Summer (DST): UTC+02:00 (CEST)
- INSEE/Postal code: 82026 /82800
- Website: www.bruniquel.fr
- ^{1} French Land Register data, which excludes lakes, ponds, glaciers > 1 km^{2} (0.386 sq mi or 247 acres) and river estuaries.

Bruniquel (French pronunciation: [bʁynikɛl]; Languedocien: Borniquèl) is a commune in the Tarn-et-Garonne department in the Occitanie region in Southern France. It is in the Quercy natural region, on the departmental border with Tarn. The commune is a member of Les Plus Beaux Villages de France (The Most Beautiful Villages of France) association.

== Geography ==
The tiny fortified village of 561 inhabitants is at an altitude of 250 m (820 ft) by the river Aveyron. The river Vère flows northward through the commune, then flows into the Aveyron, which forms most of the commune's northern border.

== Sights ==
The village is a picturesque mixture of old pink stone and red tile with a dramatic belfry, medieval gateways and defensive walls. Two feudal medieval castles dominate the village and the valley, one of which is the Château de Bruniquel.

The 'old' castle was built in the 12th century on the ruins of an earlier fortress said to have been founded by Queen Brunehaut in the 6th century and remained occupied until the 20th century. It was the home of William of Tudela who wrote the first part of La Chanson de la Croisade Albigeoise, an account of the Albigensian Crusade against the Cathars. The castle is notable for a gallery 20 metres (66 ft) long in Renaissance style overhanging the valley of which it offers steep views that many visitors find alarming.

The 'young' castle was built in the 15th century and occupied for about 200 years. It now houses a museum of prehistory exhibiting "treasures of Bruniquel" found in several caves near the castles.

These caves include the Cave of Mayrières supérieure which contains ancient wall paintings that were damaged by overenthusiastic graffiti cleaners in 1991 and the Bruniquel Magdalenian abris, as well as the Bruniquel Cave that includes evidence of Neanderthal activity.

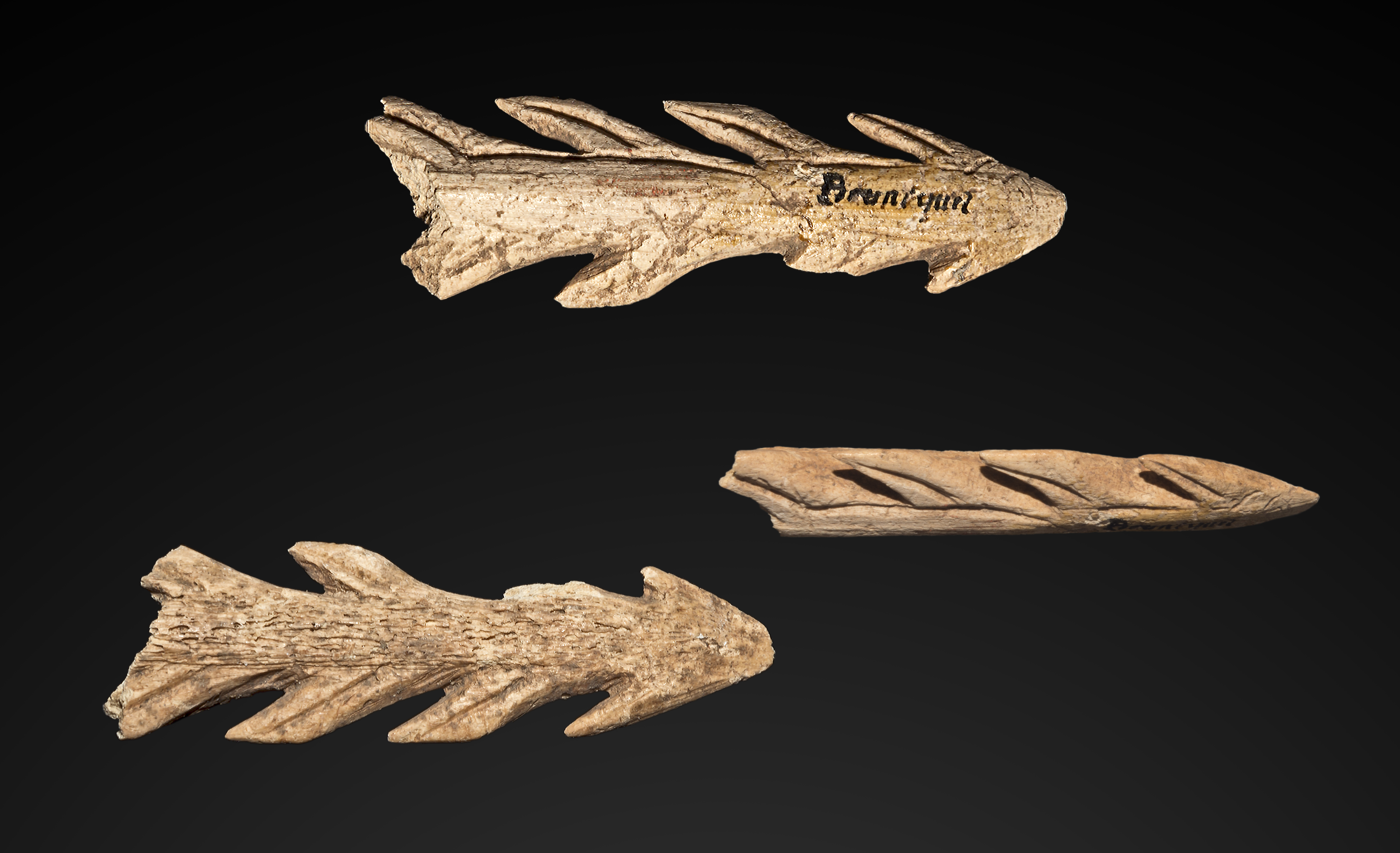
Harpoon reindeer bones MHNT

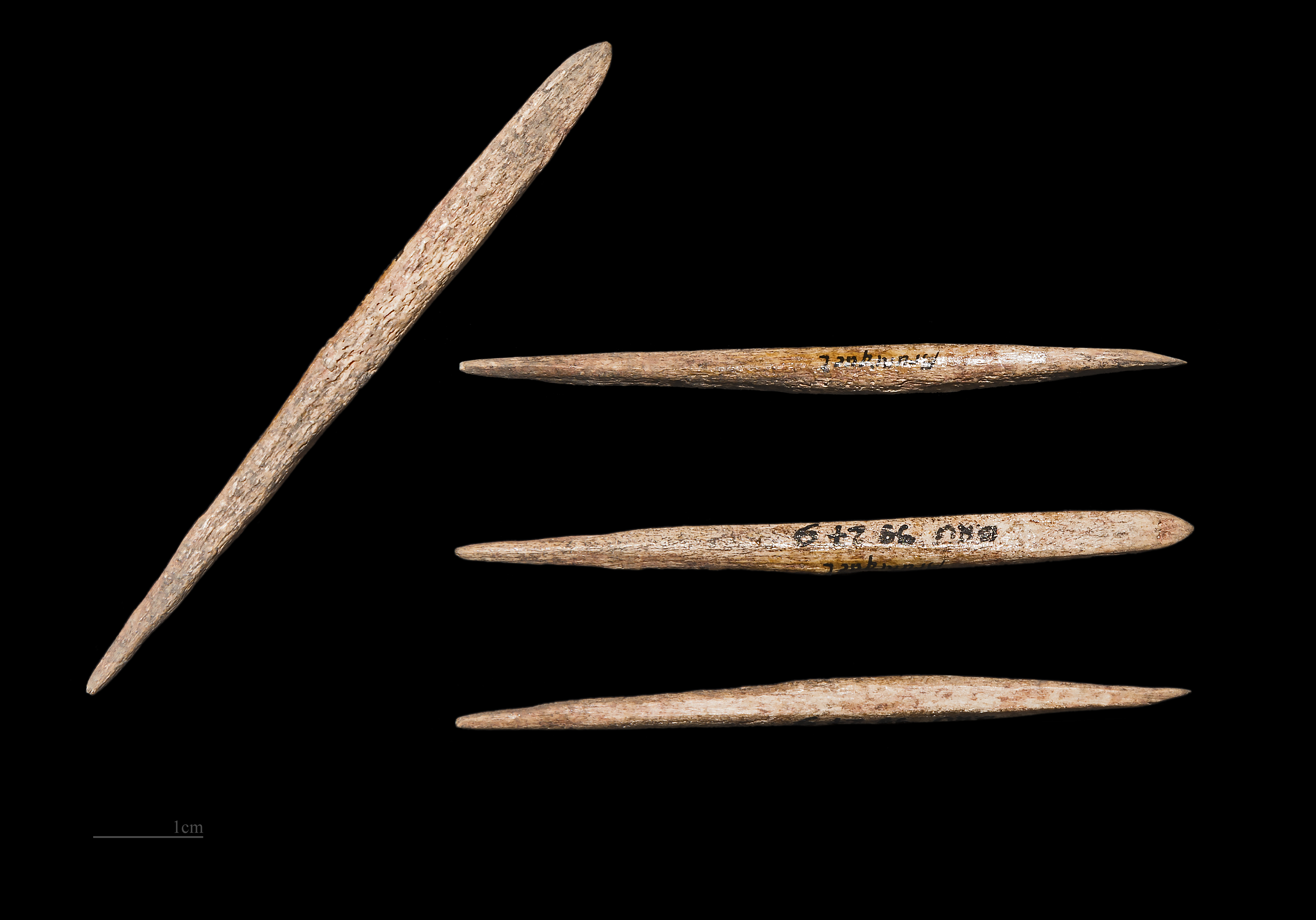
Sewing needle Magdalenian MHNT

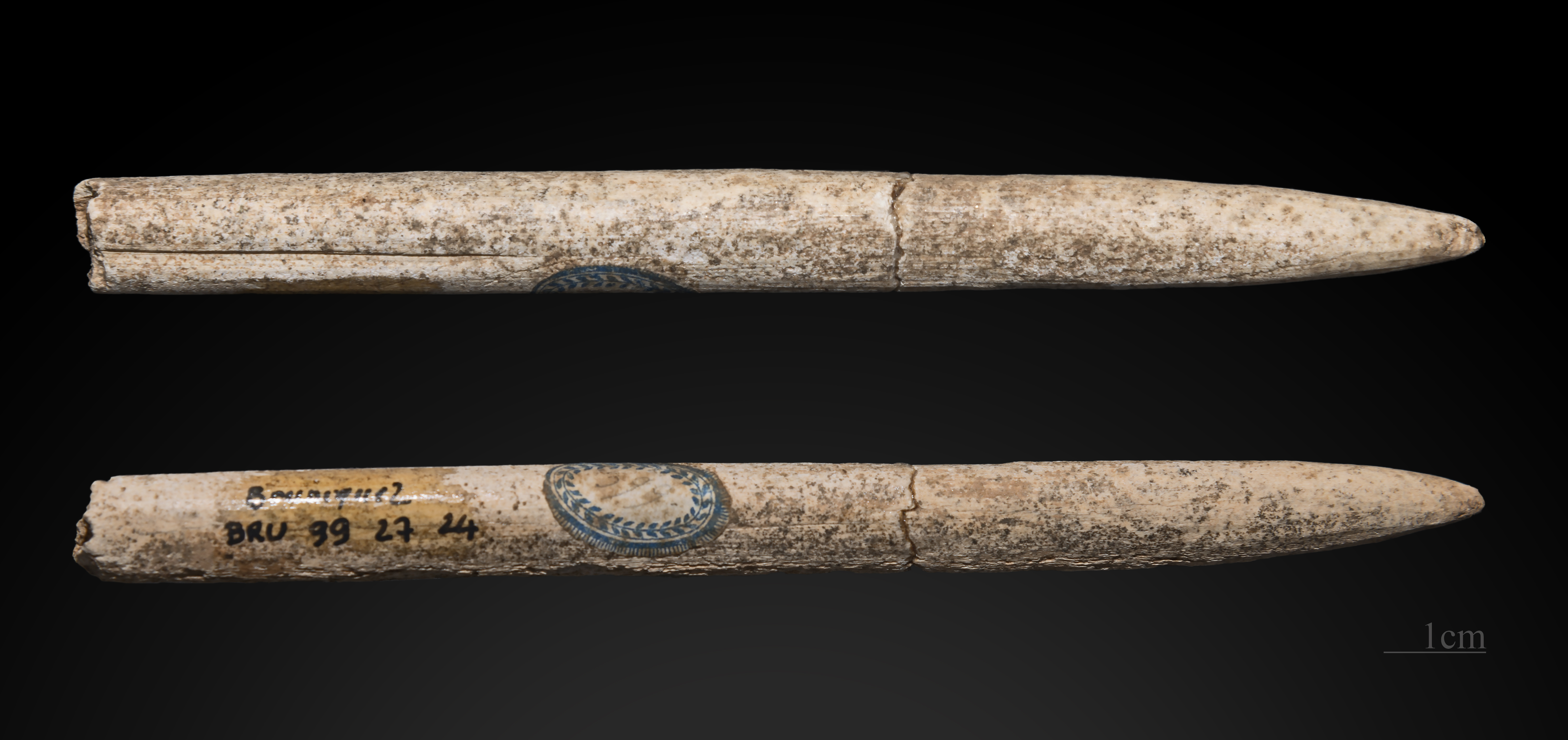
Javelin head, in bone MHNT

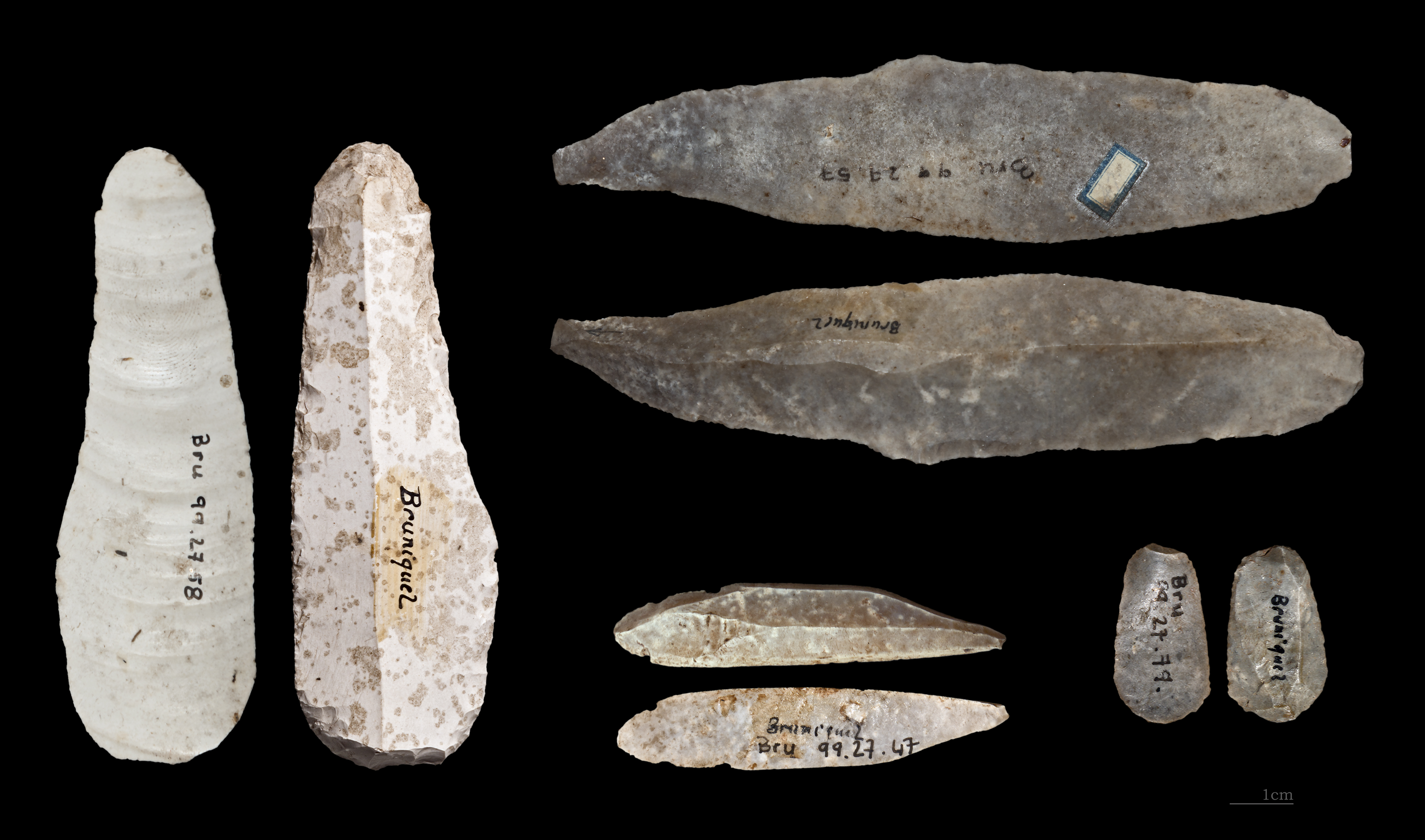
Lithic industry MHNT

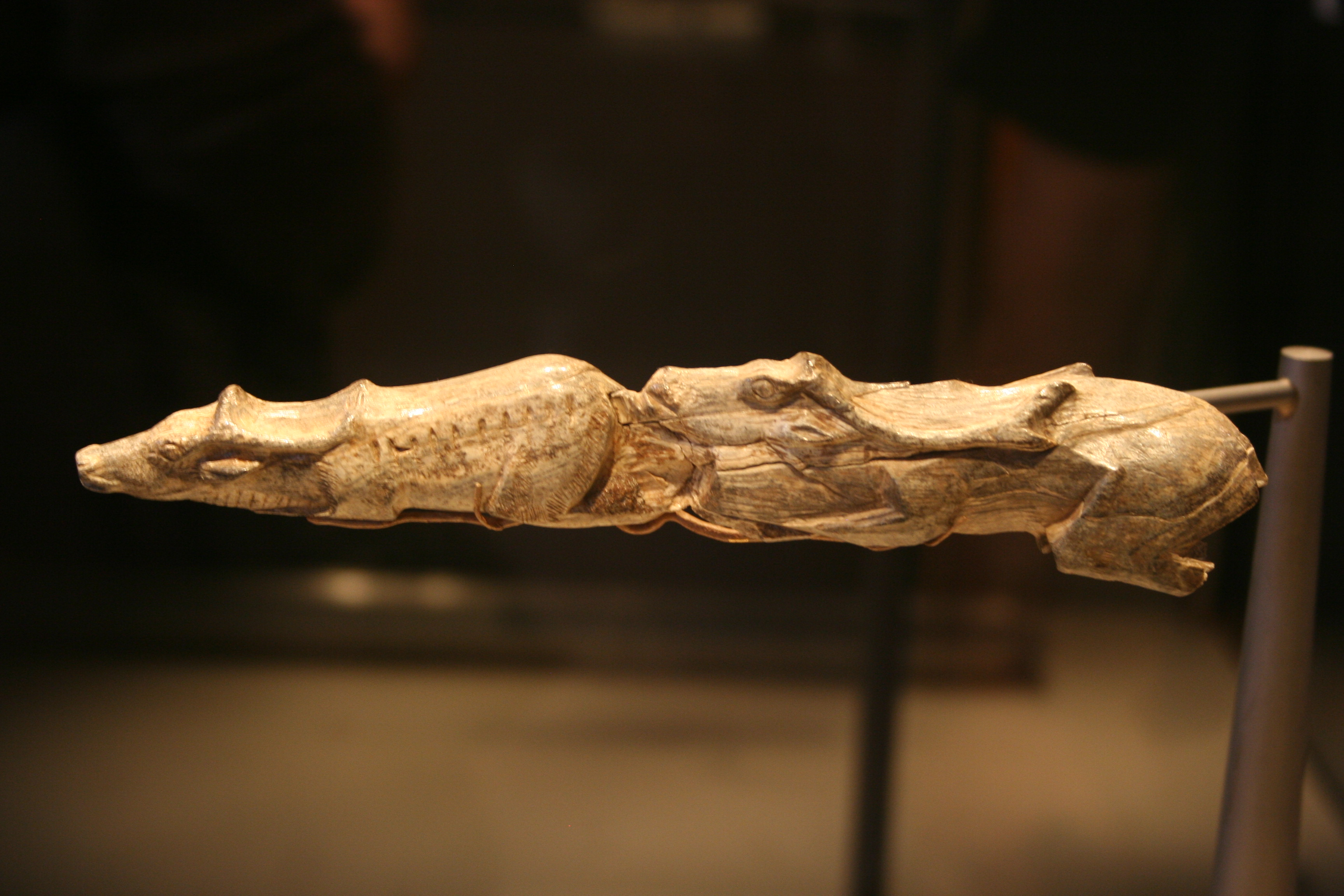
Swimming Reindeer BM

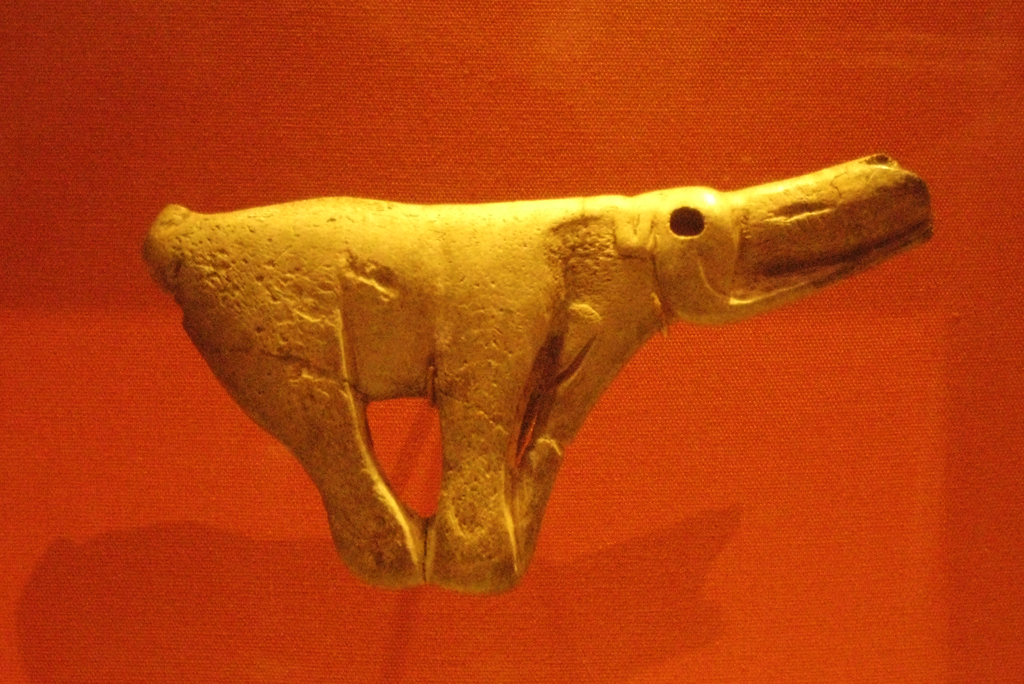
Mammoth spear thrower BM

== Miscellaneous ==
The commune's shield depicts a red chevron above a ram's head on a green ground.

Since 1997 the castles have been the venue of an annual arts festival celebrating the works of Jacques Offenbach.

The village, including the Château de Bruniquel, and its surroundings feature in the 1975 film Le Vieux Fusil (The Old Rifle) directed by Robert Enrico starring Romy Schneider and Philippe Noiret.

== Transportation ==
There is a scheduled bus service to Montauban.

== See also ==
- Communes of the Tarn-et-Garonne department
