= List of marketing terms =

Many terms are used in the marketing field.

== General terms ==
- AIDA (marketing)
- Arrow information paradox
- Attack marketing
- Bargain bin
- Business-to-business
- Business-to-consumer
- Business-to-government
- Call to action
- Cause marketing
- Copy testing
- Customer relationship management
- Decision making unit
- Davie-Brown Index
- Disintermediation
- Double jeopardy (marketing)
- Emotional branding
- Engagement (marketing)
- Facelift (product)
- Fallacy of quoting out of context
- Fine print
- Flighting (advertising)
- Growth Hacking
- Heavy-up
- Inseparability
- Intangibility
- Integrated marketing communications
- Low-end market
- Marketing communications
- Marketing experimentation
- Marketing exposure
- Marketing information system
- Marketing mix for product software
- Marketing mix modeling
- Marketing speak
- Megamarketing
- Networks in marketing
- Next-best-action marketing
- Nielsen ratings
- Out-of-box experience
- Perishability
- Permission marketing
- Price Analysis
- Product lifecycle
- Product lifecycle management
- Promoter (entertainment)
- Relational goods
- Representative office
- Science-to-business marketing
- SEO – search engine optimization
- Share of Wallet
- Soft launch
- Solutions Marketing
- SONCAS
- Sports Entertainment
- Square inch analysis
- Sweeps period
- Top of mind awareness
- Visual merchandising
- White label

== Marketing metrics ==
- Abandonment rate
- Churn rate
- Click-through rate
- Conversion marketing
- Cost per action
- Cost Per Click
- Cost per conversion
- Cost per impression
- Cost per lead
- Cost per mille
- Customer acquisition cost
- Customer lifetime value
- Frequency (marketing)
- Q Score
- Reach (advertising)
- Response rate ratio
- Return on investment
- ROMI (return on marketing investment)
- View-through rate
