= Monash University Faculty of Business and Economics =

Business school in Melbourne, Victoria, Australia

Faculty of Business and Economics - Monash University
- Established: 1961
- Accreditation: Advance Collegiate Schools of Business (AACSB), EFMD Quality Improvement System (EQUIS), Association of MBAs (AMBA)
- Affiliations: Group of Eight
- Dean: Professor Simon Wilkie
- Faculty: 420+ (FTE)
- Students: 21,600+ (EFTSL)
- Location: Melbourne, Australia
- Website: https://www.monash.edu/business

The Faculty of Business and Economics is one of the 10 primary faculties at Monash University.

The Faculty is made up of two distinct schools – Monash Business School located in Melbourne, Australia and the School of Business at Monash University Malaysia. In addition, the Faculty runs specialist business units and courses at Monash Suzhou in China, the Monash Prato Centre in Italy and Monash Indonesia, located in Jakarta.

Collectively the Faculty of Business and Economics is home to over 21,600 students. It offers undergraduate, graduate and research degrees, with different options available at the different Monash locations.

== History ==
The current Faculty structure is the result of the amalgamation of the Monash University Faculty of Economics and Politics, based at the University's Clayton campus, and the David Syme Business School, based at what is now the University's Caulfield campus. Monash University Malaysia School of Business was included as part of the Faculty in 1998 and in 2014, Monash Business School was created to encompass all Australian-based operations. Teaching of business degrees commenced at Monash Suzhou in 2020 and Monash Indonesia in 2021.

== Monash Business School, Australia ==
Monash Business School operates on three of Monash University’s four campuses in and around the city of Melbourne – Clayton, Caulfield and Peninsula. It is structured into seven discipline-based departments, together with four research centres and a Leadership and Executive Education group that is responsible for delivery of the Global Executive MBA and a range of Executive Education programs. The School also delivers a wide range of single and double coursework undergraduate and graduate programs, as well as research degrees.

=== Departments and Centres ===
- Department of Accounting
- Department of Banking and Finance
- Department of Business Law and Taxation
- Department of Econometrics and Business Statistics
- Department of Economics
- Department of Management
- Department of Marketing
- Centre for Development Economics and Sustainability (CDES)
- Centre for Health Economics (CHE)
- Monash Centre for Financial Studies (MCFS)
- Leadership and Executive Education

== School of Business, Monash University Malaysia ==
The School of Business is one of eight schools at Monash University Malaysia which was the first foreign university campus in Malaysia. Home to over 8,400 students from 78 different countries, Monash University Malaysia has established strong links with industry and government.

The School of Business is structured into seven discipline-based departments. The undergraduate program is anchored around the Bachelor of Business and Commerce and the graduate offering includes the Master of International Business (coursework) and the Doctor of Philosophy (research).

=== Departments ===
- Department of Accounting
- Department of Banking and Finance
- Department of Business Law and Taxation
- Department of Econometrics and Business Statistics
- Department of Economics
- Department of Management
- Department of Marketing

=== Accreditation ===
Monash University Malaysia School of Business is one of the few business schools in Malaysia to be accredited by the Association to Advance Collegiate Schools of Business (AACSB) which is the longest standing, most recognised form of specialised/professional accreditation an institution and its business programs can earn worldwide.

== Academic leadership ==
=== Leadership team ===
- Professor Simon Wilkie, Dean, Faculty of Business and Economics and Head, Monash Business School
- Professor Pervaiz K Ahmed, Head, School of Business (Malaysia)
- Professor Michelle Welsh, Senior Deputy Dean, Faculty Operations
- Professor Robert Brooks, Deputy Dean, Education
- Professor Deep Kapur, Deputy Dean, External Engagement and Director, Monash Centre for Financial Studies
- Professor Michaela Rankin, Deputy Dean, International and Accreditation
- Professor Richard Hall, Deputy Dean, Leadership and Executive Education
- Professor Russell Smyth, Deputy Dean, Research
- Michelle Clarke, Faculty General Manager
- Amanda Michael, Faculty Finance Manager

=== Heads of Department ===
- Professor Abe de Jong, Head, Department of Banking and Finance
- Professor Rob J. Hyndman, Head, Department of Econometrics and Business Statistics
- Professor Gavin Jack, Head, Department of Management
- Professor Hean Tat Keh, Head, Department of Marketing
- Professor Carolyn Sutherland, Head, Department of Business Law and Taxation
- Professor Michael Ward, Head, Department of Economics
- Professor Carla Wilkin, Head, Department of Accounting

== Notable faculty ==
- Professor Greg J. Bamber
- Professor Eduard Bomhoff
- Professor Maureen Brunt
- Professor Dianne Cook
- Professor Peter Dixon
- Professor Allan Fels
- Professor Rob J. Hyndman
- Professor Hean Tat Keh
- Professor Gael M. Martin
- Professor Yew-Kwang Ng
- Professor Xiaokai Yang
- Professor Yves Zenou

== Alumni ==
Alumni of the Faculty include:

- Richard Alston, Former Australian Senator and Minister, current Australian High Commissioner in London
- Mark Birrell - Company director, former Minister for Industry, Science and Technology
- Julian Burnside QC - High profile barrister, human rights advocate, author
- Alastair Clarkson - Former AFL footballer, current coach of the Hawthorn Football Club
- Simon Crean MP - Australian Minister for Trade, former Leader of the Opposition and Minister for Employment, Education and Training
- Josh Frydenberg MP - Prominent Investment Banker and current federal Member for Kooyong.
- Alan Griffiths, former Australian Minister for Industry and Resources
- Margaret Jackson AC - Company Director, first female Chairman of Qantas
- John Langmore - Politician and author
- Lim Guan Eng - Malaysian politician
- Ian Little (1956-2006) - Secretary of the Department of Treasury and Finance, 1998-2006
- Michael Luscombe - former CEO of the Woolworths conglomerate
- Ian Macfarlane AC - Economist, Governor of the Reserve Bank of Australia, 1996-2006
- Peter Marriott - Chief Financial Officer, Australia and New Zealand Banking Group (ANZ)
- Julian McGauran - Australian Senator
- Andrew Mohl - Managing Director and CEO, AMP
- Stuart Morris, Justice of the Supreme Court of Victoria, President of VCAT
- Trevor O'Hoy - President and CEO, Foster's Group
- Martin Pakula - Current Victorian Minister for Industry, Trade and Industrial Relations
- Pasuk Phongpaichit - Economist, author, anti-corruption campaigner
- Peter Reith - Executive Director of the European Bank for Reconstruction and Development, former Defence Minister
- Gary P. Sampson - WTO economist
- Helen Silver - Secretary of the Victorian Department of Premier and Cabinet
