= Response rate =

Response rate may refer to:

- Response rate (medicine) – the percentage of patients whose cancer shrinks or disappears after treatment
- Response rate (survey) – the percentage of persons asked to answer a survey who actually answer
