= Optimizely =

American software company

Optimizely, Inc.
- Type: Private
- Industry: Software
- Founded: January 2010
- Founder: Dan Siroker; Pete Koomen
- Headquarters: United States
- Area served: Worldwide
- Key people: Alex Atzberger; (CEO); Shafqat Islam; (CMO); Myles Johnson; (CFO)
- Number of employees: 1,400+ (as of May 2024)
- Parent: Episerver
- Website: www.optimizely.com

Optimizely is an AI platform purpose-built for enterprise marketing teams. They offer an agent platform to build and deploy AI agents, a content management system, agentic experimentation, A/B testing and multivariate testing tools, personalization, and feature toggle capabilities, as well as a content marketing platform and digital commerce solutions.

The company was acquired by Episerver in October 2020 and in January 2021 Episerver announced that they were branding the combined company as "Optimizely".

== History ==
Optimizely logo up until 2026

Optimizely was founded in 2010 by Dan Siroker and Pete Koomen, both formerly of Google. Optimizely completed the Y Combinator seed accelerator program in the winter of 2010. In November 2010, Optimizely closed a US$1.2 million funding round from angel investors. The company became cash flow positive in 2011. In May 2012 Optimizely announced that it had raised new funding from Battery Ventures, GV, and InterWest Partners.

In April 2013, Optimizely raised $28 million in Series A round funding. The round was led by Benchmark, with participation from Bain Capital Ventures and Optimizely's existing investors Battery Ventures, InterWest Partners, and Google Ventures. Benchmark's Peter Fenton joined Optimizely's board of directors. In April 2013 Optimizely launched support for nine European languages.

On April 17, 2014, Optimizely held its first Opticon user conference, where it announced the launch of its new mobile app A/B testing software. In May 2014, Optimizely raised $57 million in Series B funding. The round was led by Andreessen Horowitz with participation from Benchmark and Bain Capital Ventures. As part of the round, Scott Weiss general partner at Andreessen Horowitz joined Optimizely's board of directors.

In October 2015, the company released its second product for mobile and website personalization. The same month, Optimizely raised $58 million in Series C funding, led by Index Ventures, with participation from firms such as Andreessen Horowitz, Bain Capital Ventures, Battery Ventures, Benchmark Capital, Citi Ventures, Danhua Capital, Salesforce Ventures and Tenaya Capital. As part of the round, Ilya Fushman of Index joined Optimizely's board of directors.

On March 10, 2016, Optimizely laid off 40 employees, 10% of the workforce. In September 2016, the company released Optimizely X, with expanded solutions for web experimentation, personalization, recommendations, mobile, full stack, and OTT.

In July 2017, Jay Larson replaced Dan Siroker as the company's CEO. Pete Koomen was the company's CTO in 2012. Co-founder Dan Joseph Siroker became the company's Executive Chairman in July 2017.

In July 2020, the company laid off 15% of its staff due to the impact of the COVID-19 pandemic. On September 3, 2020, Episerver announced that they were acquiring Optimizely, and the acquisition was completed on October, 21st 2020.

On January 27, 2021, Episerver announced that they were rebranding the combined company as Optimizely. On March 22, 2021, Optimizely acquired Zaius, a Customer Data Platform. On December 6, 2021, Optimizely acquired Welcome, a marketing orchestration platform. On September 30th, 2024, Optimizely acquired NetSpring, a Native-Warehouse Analytics tool.

== Security Breach ==
On November 16, 2026, malicious JavaScript was detected inside the Optimizely Web experimentation platform. It was discovered by security researcher Scott Helme who confirmed that cryptocurrency had already been stolen. Visitors of 178 organizations, among them Zoom, BBC, CNN, GitLab, IKEA, Air France, KLM, and the cryptocurrency platform Ledger had been targeted.

Subsequent investigation by Optimizely and security researchers determined that the attacker had exploited a vulnerability in Optimizely's Web Experimentation account signup flow to gain unauthorized write access to the custom projectJS field across 188 snippets belonging to 178 organizations. The injected code loaded a second-stage script designed to skim payment card fields, hijack clipboard cryptocurrency wallet addresses, and deliver exploit chains targeting iOS and iPadOS devices. Optimizely stated that it blocked the vulnerable signup path, removed the injected code, revoked active tokens and sessions, and reset affected accounts.

== Software ==
Optimizely offers an AI platform purpose-built for marketing teams, offering an agent platform for building, scaling, managing, and deploying AI agents, an AI data interaction layer called 'Mark', experimentation products (Web Experimentation and Feature Experimentation), CMS (both SaaS and PaaS), a Content Marketing Platform, a Customer Data Platform and an Email Campaign Tool.
