= Networks in marketing =

Networks are crucial parts of any action taken in a marketplace. Peter Drucker even described the future economy as one of a society of networks. Companies embedded in such networks stand to gain a lot. There are a number of different network models, which have distinct relevance to customers, and marketing initiatives. A network in marketing can be formed either strategically (e.g. Business networking) or completely randomly (e.g. Referral economy). Marketing channels and business networks have been referred to, by Achrol & Kotler as:

“Interdependent systems of organizations and relations that are involved in carrying out all of the production and marketing activities involved in creating and delivering value in the form of products and services to intermediate and final customers.”

Achrol & Kotler stated that networks are not accepting of traditional mechanisms, such as authority and control. Suggesting that organizational hierarchy, power and contracts are now exchanged for instruments of relational control. Businesses such as Ford, Procter & Gamble and General Electric have evolved in much the same. It wasn't all to long ago that they were organized as classic hierarchies. Displaying central control, unified purpose, and complex management structure of many tiers.

Business and marketing networks differ in the amount of connectivity between agents. Some markets, which are more fragmented, have less connectivity between agents than others. On top of this, the level of complexity differs between various networks, some may seem ordered and rather linear, whereas other random and chaotic. As a network develops, agents or entities form relationships with others, which increases the efficiency of operations. Although, this inevitably adds complexity to otherwise simple networks, and makes them more prone to chaos.

== Networks in general ==
A network is a web of interrelated lines, passages, or edges, intersecting at a certain points, nodes, vertices, or places, which can be interlinked with other networks and contain sub networks . Networks have been linked to branches of mathematics, electronics, biology, and biosocial fields. Studies of inter-organization relations, and its networks, can be traced to early societies.

== History ==
In 1736, Leonhard Euler created graph theory. Graph theory paved the way for network models such as Barabási-Albert's scale-free networks, chance networks such as Paul Erdös and Alfréd Rényi, Erdős–Rényi model, which applies to random graph theory, and Watts & Strogatz Small-world network, all of which can be adapted to be representative of strategies and or relationships in the marketplace.

With respect to marketing, much of the creation of theories around systems, structure, and the management of business networks, can arguably be attributed to early economists such as John Common, Ronald Coase, and Joseph Schumpter. John Commons, in 1934, took ideas from the fields of law, economics, and psychology, and focused on transactions as a rudimentary unit of analysis. Commons showed how united economic entities arise and grow to deal with inherent conflicts of interest among agents and how united organizations are in control of individual actions in that it both restricts and facilitates it. Joseph Schumpter, in 1939, focused on the processes underlying industrial organizations and how they have transformed. He showed how the battle for survival among various types of businesses and networks, vying to serve the needs of society, fashioned the change of the industrial sector. Ronald Coase, in 1937, introduced the concept of transaction cost. His research signified the development of ideas about exchange and more specifically the cost of securing agreements as well as coordinating, controlling and implementing them. These three economists, Wilkinson stated, have been especially influential in the development of theories surrounding networks in marketing.

There are a number of notable historic studies, pieces of literature marketing networks. Theodore Macklin, in 1921, published a book called ‘Efficient marketing for agriculture’. He emphasized the importance of maintaining relationships between farmers and local middlemen, and between various levels of middlemen in bringing about successful and efficient marketing. Wilkinson stated that his study can be seen as a precursor for research on marketing and economic evolution and the way the development of marketing organizations linked local markets to larger scale markets that enabling the steps of economic specialize. Another key study in the field could be that by Ralph Breyer, in 1924. Breyer introduced the thought of marketing flows, depicting marketing frameworks in terms of the flow of electric current through wires, when connections are made. Distinguishing organization unit channels, enterprise channels, business type channels, and channel groups with respect to the number of business actors involved. In 1940's, there were signs that change was in order. Marketers by the names of Wroe Alderson, and Reavis Cox wrote an article in 1948, proposing a number of ways that marketing theory could be built upon. Alderson's research depicted a divide in the development of marketing thought and more specifically the structure and operations of channel networks and marketing institutions. They sought to understand the nature of work and the functional requirements of a marketing system and the way that marketing organizations come about to carry out this work.

These previously mentioned studies and pieces of literature demonstrate the creation of various ideas and thought surrounding networks in marketing. As the years have passed these concepts have develop and evolved, as will be shown.

=== 1960s ===
Studies around this time had a focus on the economic structure of distribution channels, looking at it from more of a macro view. A significant study was that by Cox, Goodman, and Fichandler, which built upon previous research conducted by Stewart, Dewhurst and Field (1939) and examined the distribution in a high level economy. Bert McCammon, in 1963, enriched the field further. He drew from previous literature by Schumpter and Coase, bringing together research and ideas from a number of behavioural sciences exploring the processes of change occurring in channel systems.

Other developments made in the 1960s were a number of models of channel systems. These models were created to study the many interactions taking place and how they affected performance. Wilkinson cited Forrester's (1961) models of industrial dynamics and Balderston and Hoggat (1962) models of market processes as fundamental frameworks for following logistic models developed by Bowersox (1972) and his colleagues.

=== 1970s ===
Research around this time looked more at the behavioral dimensions of channels, somewhat the result of Wroe Alderson's earlier writings. The first attempts were made to improve the typical conceptual models of inter-firm relations towards the tail end of the 1970s. Major developments were undertaken by researchers such as Robicheaux. Also the first marketing channels textbook was created Malled in 1976. Research in this decade was very limited in that studies were considered unsuccessful if conflict and power were not present. Leading researchers to focus on the car industry and franchisor-franchisee relations were conflict and power are more likely.

=== 1980s ===
As the 1980s dawned so too did another era of research into networks and its behavioral dimensions. A significant study by Phillips, in 1981, challenged the problem of various informants in inter-firm relations research. Phillips suggested that the perceptions of a relationship differed across various informants in an organization. Putting into question the validity of many studies carried out in the years prior. It also showed that inter-organization relations involve personal as well as business relations and interactions between many people in a company.

Researchers also started to explore additional facets of inter-organization relations, combining them with more extensive models of relationships (e.g. Anderson and Narus). As well as this work by Oliver Williamsons in 1975 on transaction cost and the nature and price of inter-firm governance, sparked interest again on economic theories.

=== 1990s ===
Literature around the 1990s brought together a number of research traditions. This is when various theories such as relationship marketing in industrial and consumer market appeared. The connection between services marketing to the analysis of relations and networks emerged. There was also more of a focus on cooperation as opposed to competing relations, which caused in an eruption of interest in the region of relationships and networks. Furthermore, Researchers began directing more effort to network dimensions, as opposed to isolated dyadic relationship. Moreover, new technology has been used in the study of business networks, allowing for specific issues to be addressed.

The developments made in the last several decades, demonstrate the evolution of pre-existing concepts and models in relation to networks in marketing, first proposed in the 1950s and 60's. Wilkinson stated that what is needed now is the application of modeling techniques to portray networks in marketing, in order to strengthen current theories with empirical evidence.

=== 2000s to present ===
Various studies have used a number of methods to study business networks. One such study conducted by Aino Halinen, & Jan-Åke Törnroos, looked at how networks are constructed and how they function in the modern day world. Giving insight into use of case studies as a method of measurement. Another key study, conducted by Jun, Kim, Kim, & Choi, modeled consumer referrals through use of a small world network. Demonstrating that Watts & Strogatz's Small world network model can be adapted to interpret the initial linear relationship between firms, and consumers, and its subsequent development exhibiting small world properties. Alternatively a study by Lorenzo Bizzi & Ann Langley (2012) considered the key choices, with regard to methodology, met by researchers, when looking at network dynamics.

== Examples ==
Work by Ravi Achrol & Philip Kotler identified several marketing network models.

=== Layered network ===
The first model proposed was that of a layered network. A layered network is a business which comprises “an operational layer of cross-functional teams on the one hand and a knowledge creating layer of functional silos on the other hand, connected internally and externally through extensive data bank knowledge and transparent information flows”. An example of this has been implemented by sharp electronics.

=== Internal marketing networks ===
The second model proposed is that of internal marketing networks. An internal marketing network is a “firm organized into internal enterprise units that operate as semiautonomous profit centers buying from, selling to, or investing in other internal or external units as best serves their needs on market determined terms of trade but subject to firm policy”. AC-Rochester is a definitive example of an internal marketing network. It is one of eight component manufacturing divisions of General Motors, structured as an internal market. It markets its products to Mitsubishi in Japan, Daewoo in Korea and Opel in Europe. Internal marketing networks have many similar properties to those of small worked networks.

=== Vertical networks ===
A vertical network comprises a groups of resource firms specializing in the various product, technologies, or services that constitute the inputs of particular industry, organized around a focal company that focusing on monitoring and managing the critical contingencies faced by the network participants in that market.

Vertical network in marketing often represent monopolies. These would include companies such as Transpower, Kiwi rail, and the like. These networks display preferential attachment, similar that of Barabasi-Albert Model.

== Small world networks ==
Watt's and Strogatz's used graph theory to create three models depicting varying amounts connectedness, these were named Small world network. A small world network Is a graph in which most nodes aren't connected to one another but as connections are made other nodes can be reached through only a couple of intermediaries. In terms of marketing small world networks have been used to model this such as consumer referrals (e.g. Jun, Kim, Kim, & Choi).

If we are to think of this in terms of a business relationship, it is not hard to see where this model becomes applicable. Consider Jun, Kim, Kim, & Choi's example of consumer referrals. Each node represents a consumer, and the connections represent the relationship one consumer has with another. As more incentive is given for referring a product the probability of increasing connections increases. What starts as a regular network, quickly becomes random and complex. This same thing could apply a network of firms, middlemen and consumers. With every step in the chain, value is added to the product, and the cost increases. This increases the incentive for middleman, and or consumer to form other connections to get better deals. As deals and relationships are forged the network becomes more and more complex and integrated, creating disorder.

== Hubs ==
‘Hubs’ or ‘connectors’ are important aspects to analyze when examining any system or network and marketing is no exception to this. A hub in a network is a consequence of a Power Law, whereby a small number of nodes or actors in a network have a disproportionately large number of links to other nodes in the network. A Power Law in a market system for instance could be explained in that there are many actors who have a very limited number of business contacts in their 'rolodex', but there are a small few, say 10% of those in the network, who have a huge number of network contacts in their 'rolodex' and can easily facilitate communication between two separated actors. The idea that in a network the majority of nodes will have a couple of links which can allow communication through many pathways, whereas hubs have a large number of links and ensure that a network has full contact and eases the complexity of this. One of the first empirical observations of hubs or connectors in social sciences experimentation came about in Stanley Milgram's Small world experiments, the first of which taking place in 1967. Of the 64 letters which made it through to the stated destination, 60% of those went through the same four people, and in a further experiment of a similar nature when 24 letters got through, 16 of those went through the same last person as a connection. Hubs are distinctive components of network systems and through understanding them a better understanding of network function and behavior can be attained. Barabási states that hubs dominate all networks through the large number of links they possess, that the links hubs provide in areas of high clustering and also between areas of high clustering demonstrate their connective qualities. The presence of hubs in a market can be an important aspect of new product adoption and diffusion rates, by utilizing hubs when bringing a product to market producers can generate more ‘buzz’ and reach a greater target audience with improved efficiency through the use of hubs and their large number of connections across a network. In terms of hubs acting as facilitators of diffusion, they can take many forms. One example of this is a celebrity endorsement in a marketing campaign for a product, the celebrity acts as the hub by using their fame and the perceived links that consumers have with their favorite celebrities to distribute information about the product which is given to them by the producer. The links involved with hubs exhibit small world properties of a number of short paths between actors which are clustered due to similarities. However, while the interconnectedness which hubs can bring into a network is a great strength it can also be their greatest weakness in that, if functioning correctly hubs keep everyone in touch through a system, but remove a hub and the clusters become segregated and communication and information flow become strained.

== Strong vs. Weak ties and their relative importance ==
The concepts of weak and strong ties in a marketing and social sciences context relates to the intensity of the relationships between members of a network. The strength of a tie according to Professor Mark Granovetter can be analyzed by looking at a combination of; the amount of time, the emotional intensity, the intimacy and mutual confiding, and the reciprocal services between those which the tie exists. A strong tie relationship obviously exhibits high levels of the afore mentioned attributes and in a relationship between two parties which is a strong tie there is assumed to be mutual choice for both parties involvement in the relationship. Strong ties are often found in highly dense groups of nodes who share many similarities and connections within the groups. Thus removing one or two strong ties in a group does not affect the information distribution through a group due to the intense interlinking present. Weak ties refer to the relationships that are present between individuals which are not actively sought out or maintained. Where strong ties require high levels of commitment and other factors a weak tie only needs a small amount of connection to function effectively and does not require mutual agreement to be present. Nor do they require similar interests across nodes in a network, on the contrary weak links occur due to different interests but are created through often minimal factors. They link groups or clusters together despite differences in the clusters and enable the flow of information or diffusion of ideas to take place across an entire network rather it remaining in one cluster. The idea that removing strong ties from a network will not have as big of an effect as removing a weak one. The concept of bridges is central to this idea. A bridge is a connection which acts as the only way for information to travel between two nodes in a network, there are no other connections available to get said information across. Due to the nature of bridges strong ties are not able to be bridges due to the interconnected nature of strong ties in a community and the presence of alternate connections to facilitate lateral diffusion. Conversely weak ties can be bridges because they are often the only links between groups or nodes, however not all weak links are bridges there may be other connections, but all bridges are weak ties, thus transmission probabilities rely heavily on them. An example of how weak ties can be effective at reaching a larger audience than strong ties is shown by Rapoport and Horvath's 1961 study of a high school in Michigan. 857 students were asked to rank their eight top friends from 1(best friend) to 8(associate). The results of the survey showed that those rated one or two were a small minority of the students, where those who were seen as more associates canvassed a vast majority of the sample. In this example the strong links were those rated as best friends where the weak links who had the ability for far greater diffusion of information were those considered associates. Through utilizing weak links available in the market a firm operating in one system or niche perhaps would potentially be able expand or tap into different markets through utilizing a weak link and diversify. Marketers also need to be aware that just because their advertisements are targeted specifically at a segment where they believe it will go down well or be acceptable such an adult advertisement on a billboard in a ‘suitable location’ or a giveaway on a beer bottle, due to weak links it has potential to be able to affect those outside the target audience or group who would find it appropriate.

== Complexity ==
Complexity in networks is tied to the notion of elements of the system or networks have relationships amongst themselves which from relationships they may have with other elements outside their group. A complex system is a system composed of interconnected parts that as a whole exhibit one or more properties which can be obvious when viewing the system as a whole, however when viewing the individual components of the system their potential to produce is not visible (or obvious). A complex system is a highly structured system, which shows structure with a number of variations. It is very sensitive to initial conditions and small alterations to these can result in dramatically different outcomes as chaos theory suggests, there are a number of pathways and evolutions which the 'butterfly's wings' are able to affect. A complex system is one that by design or function or both is difficult to understand and verify. There are multiple simultaneous interactions by actors and components which lead to an overall output of a system. It is important in a marketing environment to recognize that there are many levels of complex systems at play and that targeting individual parts of production, advertising or other aspects will not often result in proportional outputs. On this note it is also important to recognize the nesting potential in a market complex system, where a market is made up of different firms which are complex systems themselves, which in turn are made up of people who also exhibit complex system functionalities. The market must be viewed as a whole to understand the sum of the parts and analyze emergent behaviors. The many aspects of complex systems mean that they are unpredictable and involve aspects of chaos and non-linearity and this in turn leads to the rise in small-world phenomena.

== Chaos Theory ==
Chaos Theory studies the behavior of dynamical systems that are highly sensitive to initial conditions. Chaos Theory applied to marketing offers an alternative explanation for the complex, apparently disorderly patterns of behavior in marketing systems over time which are observed in phenomena such as sales, inventories, brand shares and prices. Marketing systems are identified as being nonlinear in nature because they fail to satisfy the superposition principle (outputs are not directly proportional to inputs). Even though the rules governing behavior in marketing systems are known, it is impossible to make accurate long-term predictions of system behavior due to the high sensitivity of initial conditions. This happens even though marketing systems are fully deterministic. Traditional explanations of marketing phenomena typically rely on assumed patterns of external shocks, random noise or inherently stochastic processes to account for the complex dynamics within marketing systems.

Chaos Theory explains at least a component of disorderly market behavior in terms of deterministic feedback mechanisms reflected in the rules governing system members’ behavior and interactions. This feedback represents non-linearity and occurs in two forms: (1) the reinforcing growth effect of positive feedback; and (2) the damping effect of negative feedback. Chaos theory also offers alternative explanations for the existence of various types of marketing institutions as 'disequilibrium mechanisms' designed to buffer or reduce the effects of complex dynamics. These include inventory-holding intermediaries, financial intermediaries, insurance agencies, and ordering systems. Finally, Chaos Theory can explain and predict structural change and evolution in marketing systems.

The application of chaos theory to marketing systems can lead to new ways of coping with or avoiding these chaotic patterns of behavior, to the extent the rules governing behavior are amenable to control by firms and/or policymakers.

=== Marketing Models with Chaos Properties ===
Chaos is present in several popular marketing models of product diffusion, market or brand share and market evolution. The transition from order to chaos can be demonstrated in this simple nonlinear equation, representing market evolution, under plausible assumptions of interdependence of actions and/or variables:

$N_{t+1}=rN_t[(K-N_t)/K]$

The rate of growth, $rN_t$, will be exponential as entry far exceeds exit. Eventually, the number of firms in the industry ($N_t$) approaches the capacity ($K$) and growth slows. Growth becomes negative should overcrowding occur, which may be reflected by, for example, price competition and competitive promotional activities. Eventually this competition will drive profit below threshold levels. The value $r$ determines the degree of non-linearity present in the model and is the critical determinant of the pattern of market evolution. Stable equilibrium occurs at values of less than 2, periodic and bifurcation patterns begin at values of $r$ exceeding 2 and chaos occurs at values of $r$ greater than 2.57.
