= Puygaillard-de-Quercy =

- Commune
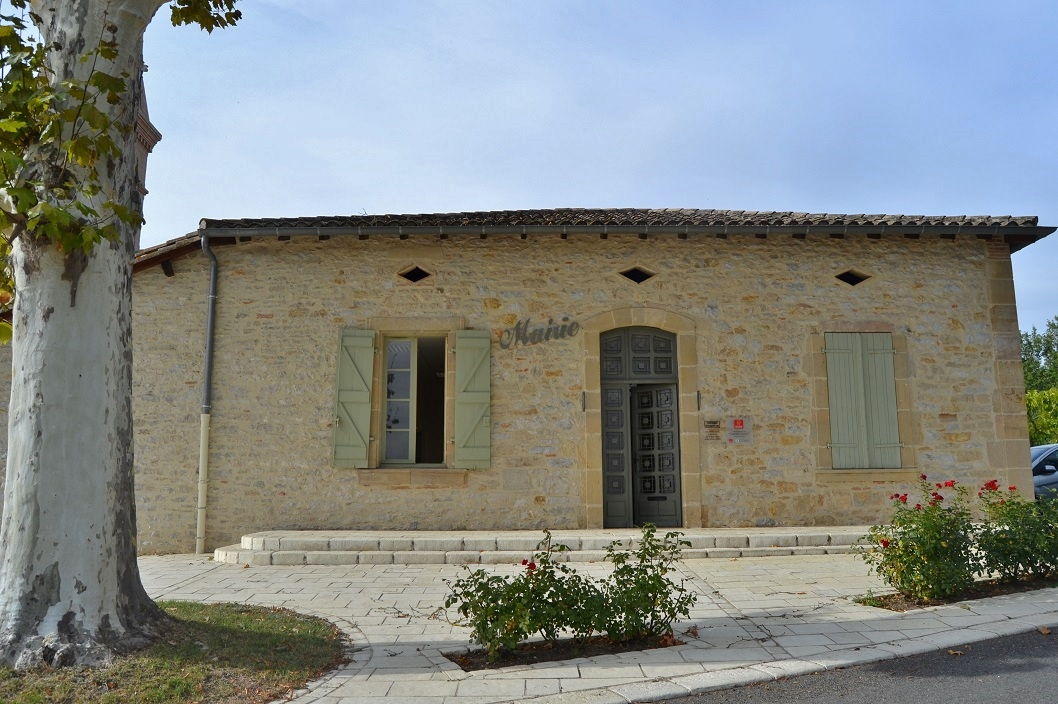
- Town hall
- Location of Puygaillard-de-Quercy
- Location within France Location within Occitanie
- Coordinates: 44°01′25″N 1°38′32″E
- Country: France
- Region: Occitania
- Department: Tarn-et-Garonne
- Arrondissement: Montauban
- Canton: Tarn-Tescou-Quercy vert
- Intercommunality: Quercy Vert-Aveyron

Government
  - Mayor (2020–2026): Gaëtan Escalette
- Area^{1}: 17.4 km^{2} (6.7 sq mi)
- Elevation: 130 m (430 ft)
- Highest elevation: 247 m (810 ft)
- Lowest elevation: 100 m (330 ft)
- Population (2023): 384
  - Density: 22.1/km^{2} (57.2/sq mi)
- Time zone: UTC+01:00 (CET)
  - Summer (DST): UTC+02:00 (CEST)
- INSEE/Postal code: 82145 /82800
- ^{1} French Land Register data, which excludes lakes, ponds, glaciers > 1 km^{2} (0.386 sq mi or 247 acres) and river estuaries.

Puygaillard-de-Quercy (French pronunciation: [pɥiɡajaʁ də kɛʁsi]; Occitan: Puèggalhard de Carcin) is a commune in the Tarn-et-Garonne department in the Occitanie region in southern France.

== See also ==
- Communes of the Tarn-et-Garonne department
