= Episerver =

Swedish software company

- Company type: Private
- Industry: Software
- Founded: Sweden (1994)
- Headquarters: Nashua, NH USA and Stockholm, Sweden
- Key people: Adam Berger, Executive Chairman; Alex Atzberger, Chief Executive Officer; Shafqat Islam, President
- Products: Episerver Digital Experience Cloud
- Parent: Insight Partners
- Website: www.episerver.com

Episerver is a software company offering web content management (WCM) (or CMS), digital commerce, and digital marketing through the Episerver Digital Experience Platform Cloud Service. In January 2021, Episerver announced they were rebranding as Optimizely, a company they acquired in October 2020.

== History ==
Episerver was founded in 1994 in Stockholm, Sweden, by Mikael Runhem. Then known as Elektropost Stockholm AB, the company focused on internet-based electronic mail. Elektropost Stockholm AB expanded to provide technology for building websites and introduced the first version of the EPiServer CMS platform in 1997. The first live installation of Episerver was at Scandinavian Leisure Group in the spring of 1998.

In 2002, the first version of EPiServer CMS, based on Microsoft’s .NET Framework, EPiServer CMS 4.0, was launched. In 2006, Mikael Runhem changed the company’s name to EPiServer AB. In 2007, the second .NET-based version of EPiServer CMS was launched, version 5.

In 2010, the company was owned by a group of investors, including Amadeus Capital, Martin Bjäringer, Monterro Holdings, Northzone Ventures, Mikael Runhem and family and employees. In November 2010, this group sold the company to IK Investment Partners.

== Mergers and acquisitions ==
IK Partners, through the IK 2007 Fund, acquired a majority stake in December 2010. The platform was later sold to Accel-KKR, a technology-focused private equity investment firm. Accel-KKR had also recently purchased Ektron, a Nashua, New Hampshire-based CMS company.

In March 2012, Episerver acquired Mediachase, an e-commerce and collaboration software solutions provider. In May of the same year, Episerver acquired 200OK AB, a Swedish enterprise search solutions provider. In May 2013, Episerver acquired Swedish search provider, Euroling.

In January 2015, Episerver and Ektron merged. Two former executives from KANA Software, CEO Mark Duffell and CMO James Norwood, were appointed President and CEO and Executive Vice President Strategy and CMO of Episerver, respectively. Martin Henricson, CEO of the former Episerver business assumed the role of Executive Chairman for the merged entity.

The company combined its software into the Episerver Digital Experience Cloud, and in June 2015, Episerver launched the first major release of its platform following the Ektron merger.

In November 2015, the company rebranded itself, changing EPiServer to Episerver, and including the shortened name “Epi”.

In August 2016, Episerver acquired Peerius, a London UK-based commerce personalization company. The brand now is fully integrated as EpiPersonalization into the Episerver Platform. Former Peerius CEO Roger Brown left the company. In October of the same year, Episerver acquired Berlin-based Optivo, an email-marketing automation service provider.

In September 2018, Episerver was sold to Insight Venture Partners for $1.16 billion.

In November 2019, Episerver acquired idio.io, a content intelligence software provider.

In December 2019, Alexander Atzberger, former President of Customer Experience at SAP, joined Episerver as the company's new CEO. In the same month, Episerver acquired Insite Software, a B2B Ecommerce provider.

In October 2020, Episerver acquired Optimizely, a digital experimentation company. Later in January 2021, Episerver announced they were rebranding as "Optimizely".
