= SONCAS =

French acronym for purchase motivation

SONCAS is a French acronym for Sécurité - Orgueil - Nouveauté - Confort - Argent - Sympathie. Well known in France, this system was invented to know what motivates a person to buy a product. After the research of a French study it was found that most people are driven by one of these six factors Sécurité - Orgueil - Nouveauté - Confort - Argent - Sympathie that could be translated to Security - Vanity - Novelty/Technology - Comfort - Money - Likeability.

This technique is used by sellers to find what motivation a buyer requires to make then buy the product. Another way of using SONCAS is to use every single point to cover all six topics to be sure to make the customer like the product.

SONCAS is also linked with the Enneagram of Personality and Maslow's hierarchy of needs.
