= Varennes, Tarn-et-Garonne =

Varennes
- Commune
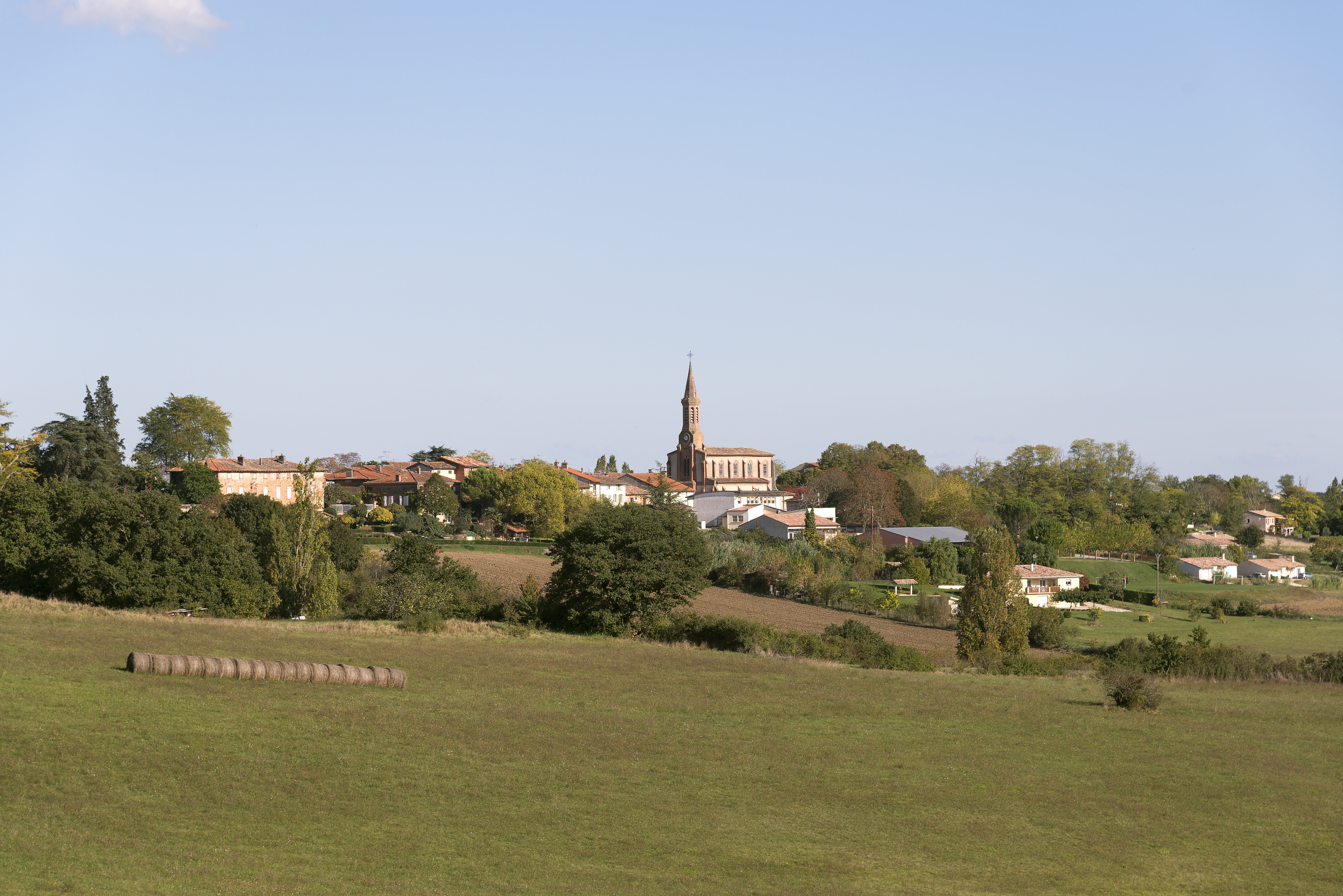
- A general view of Varennes

- Coat of arms
- Location of Varennes
- Location within France Location within Occitanie
- Coordinates: 43°54′07″N 1°29′53″E
- Country: France
- Region: Occitania
- Department: Tarn-et-Garonne
- Arrondissement: Montauban
- Canton: Tarn-Tescou-Quercy vert

Government
  - Mayor (2020–2026): Alain Albinet
- Area^{1}: 14.76 km^{2} (5.70 sq mi)
- Elevation: 206 m (676 ft)
- Highest elevation: 202 m (663 ft)
- Lowest elevation: 88 m (289 ft)
- Population (2023): 627
  - Density: 42.5/km^{2} (110/sq mi)
- Time zone: UTC+01:00 (CET)
  - Summer (DST): UTC+02:00 (CEST)
- INSEE/Postal code: 82188 /82370
- ^{1} French Land Register data, which excludes lakes, ponds, glaciers > 1 km^{2} (0.386 sq mi or 247 acres) and river estuaries.

Varennes (French pronunciation: [vaʁɛn]; Occitan: Varenas) is a commune in the Tarn-et-Garonne department in the Occitanie region in southern France.

== See also ==
- Communes of the Tarn-et-Garonne department
