= Génébrières =

- Commune
- Coat of arms
- Location of Génébrières
- Location within France Location within Occitanie
- Coordinates: 43°59′52″N 1°30′09″E
- Country: France
- Region: Occitania
- Department: Tarn-et-Garonne
- Arrondissement: Montauban
- Canton: Tarn-Tescou-Quercy vert
- Intercommunality: Quercy Vert-Aveyron

Government
  - Mayor (2024–2026): Marion Rigaud
- Area^{1}: 18.45 km^{2} (7.12 sq mi)
- Elevation: 140 m (460 ft)
- Highest elevation: 222 m (728 ft)
- Lowest elevation: 114 m (374 ft)
- Population (2023): 661
  - Density: 35.8/km^{2} (92.8/sq mi)
- Time zone: UTC+01:00 (CET)
  - Summer (DST): UTC+02:00 (CEST)
- INSEE/Postal code: 82066 /82230
- ^{1} French Land Register data, which excludes lakes, ponds, glaciers > 1 km^{2} (0.386 sq mi or 247 acres) and river estuaries.

Génébrières (French pronunciation: [ʒenebʁijɛʁ]; Occitan: Ginebrièras) is a commune in the Tarn-et-Garonne department in the Occitanie region in southern France.

== See also ==
- Communes of the Tarn-et-Garonne department
