= Nohic =

- Commune
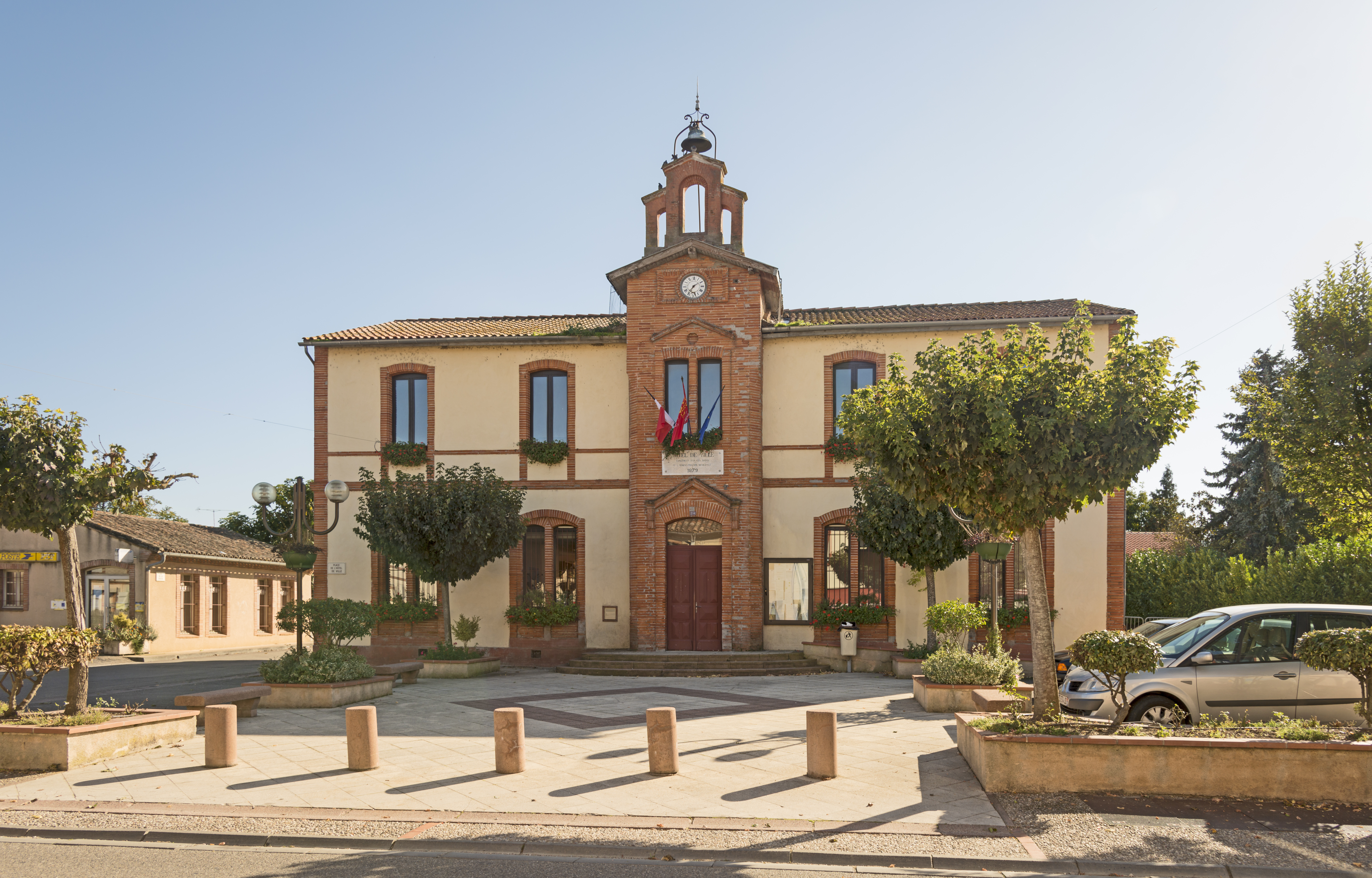
- The town hall of Nohic

- Coat of arms
- Location of Nohic
- Location within France Location within Occitanie
- Coordinates: 43°53′28″N 1°26′20″E
- Country: France
- Region: Occitania
- Department: Tarn-et-Garonne
- Arrondissement: Montauban
- Canton: Tarn-Tescou-Quercy vert

Government
  - Mayor (2020–2026): Bernard Doat
- Area^{1}: 12.61 km^{2} (4.87 sq mi)
- Elevation: 96 m (315 ft)
- Highest elevation: 111 m (364 ft)
- Lowest elevation: 75 m (246 ft)
- Population (2023): 1,388
  - Density: 110.1/km^{2} (285.1/sq mi)
- Time zone: UTC+01:00 (CET)
  - Summer (DST): UTC+02:00 (CEST)
- INSEE/Postal code: 82135 /82370
- ^{1} French Land Register data, which excludes lakes, ponds, glaciers > 1 km^{2} (0.386 sq mi or 247 acres) and river estuaries.

Nohic (French pronunciation: [nɔ.ik]; Occitan: Noïc) is a commune in the Tarn-et-Garonne department in the Occitanie region in southern France.

== Monuments ==
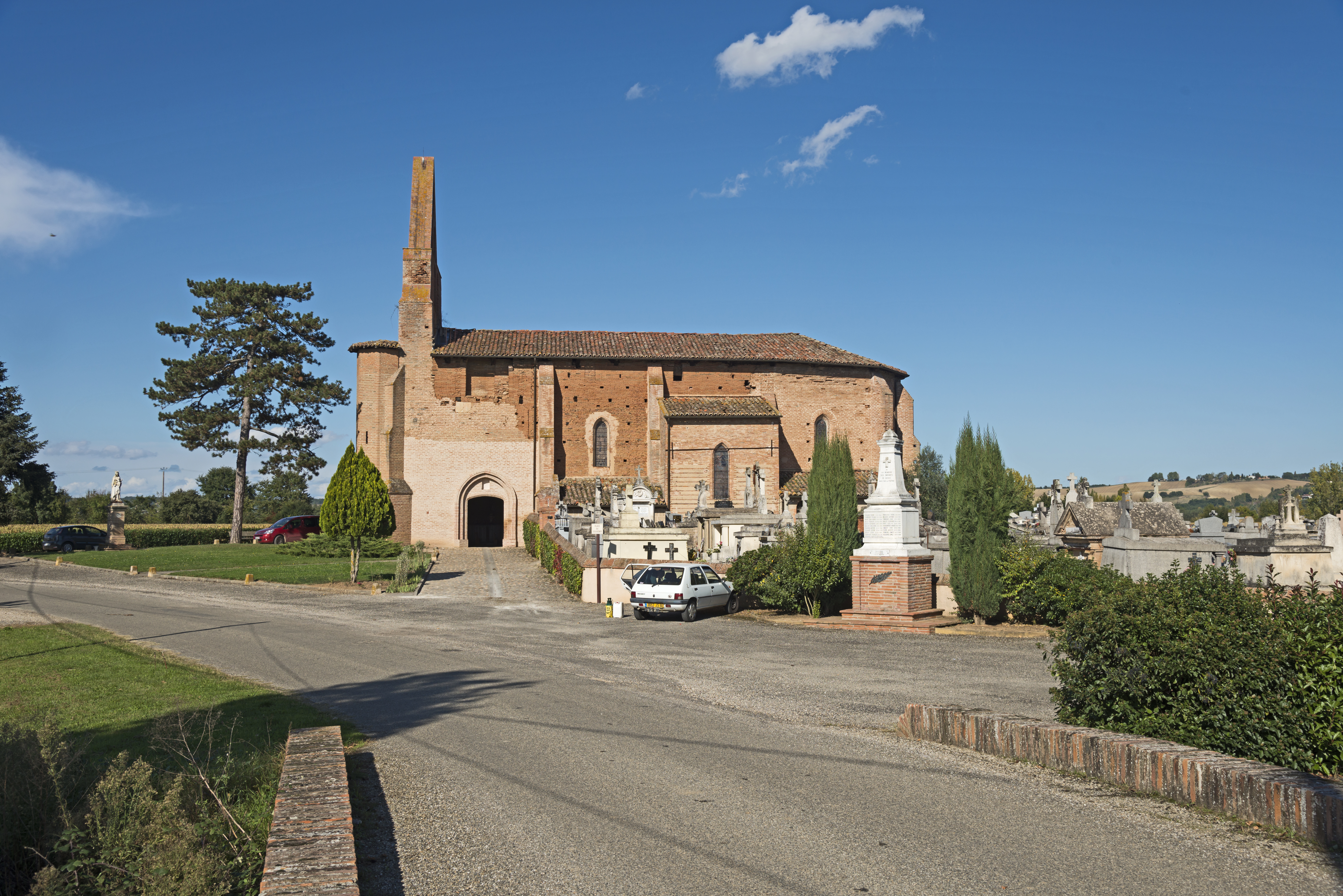
St. Sernin church

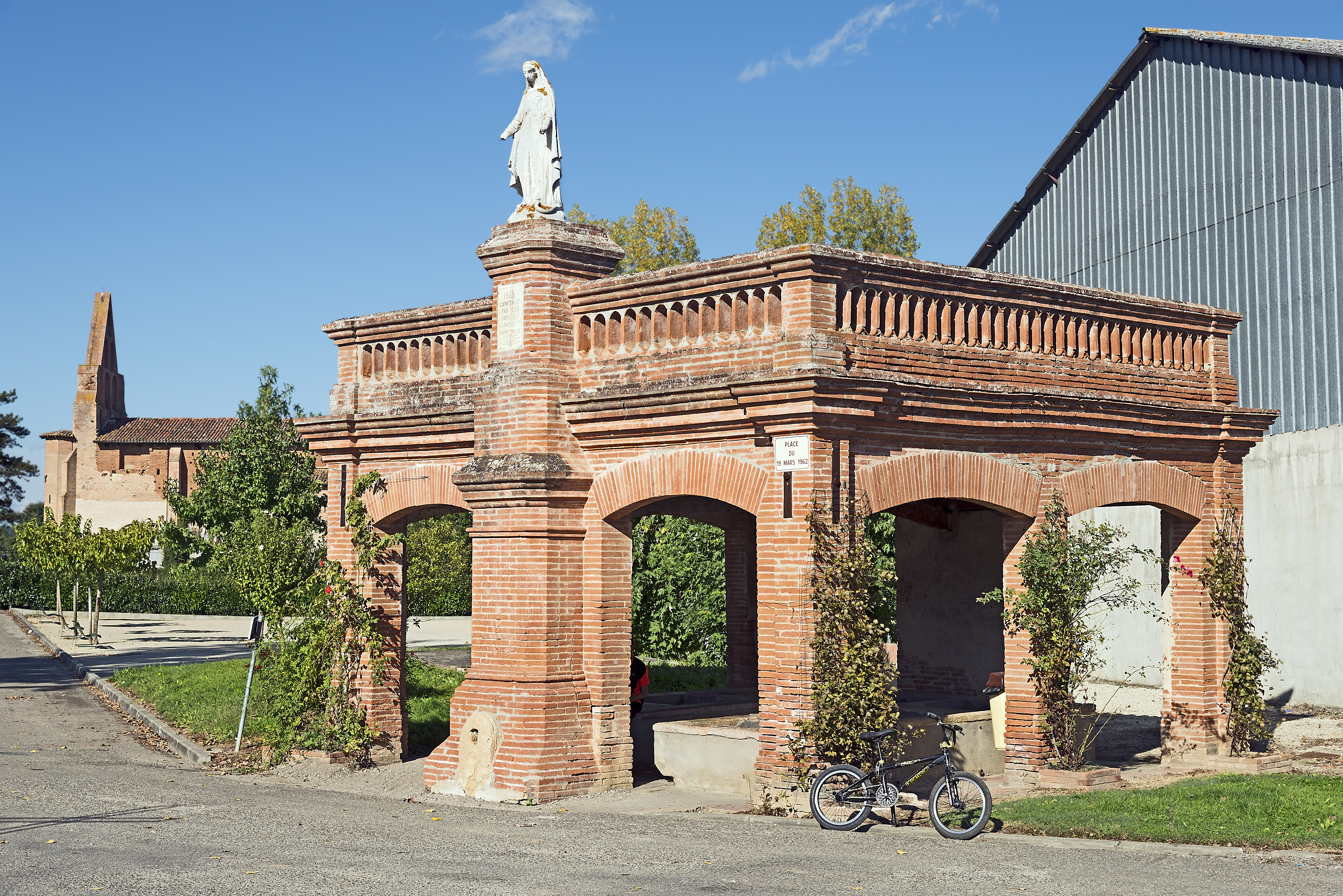
The 19th-century laundry

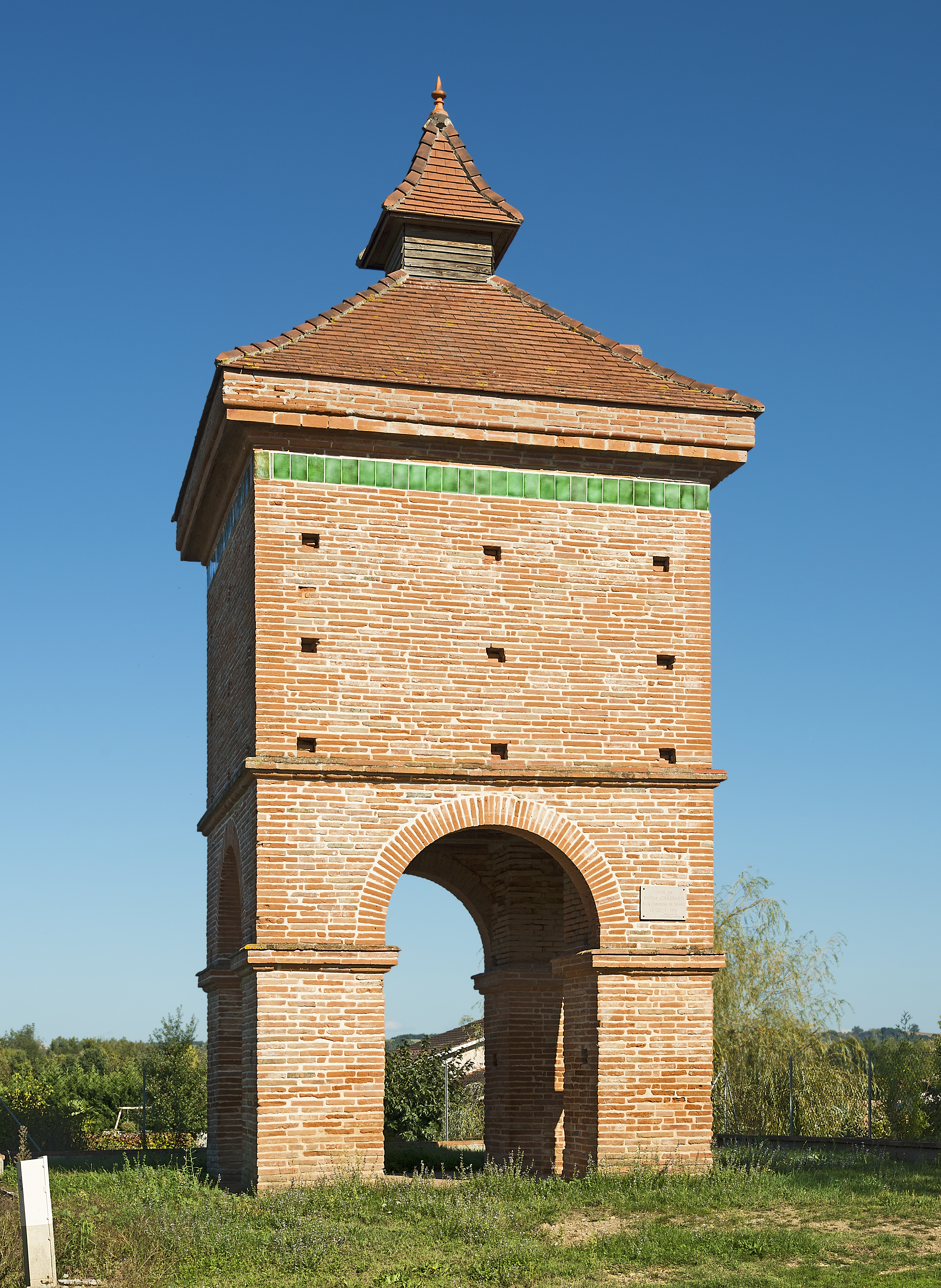
The dovecote of “la Mounette”.

== See also ==
- Communes of the Tarn-et-Garonne department
