= Verlhac-Tescou =

- Commune
- Coat of arms
- Location of Verlhac-Tescou
- Location within France Location within Occitanie
- Coordinates: 43°55′49″N 1°32′20″E
- Country: France
- Region: Occitania
- Department: Tarn-et-Garonne
- Arrondissement: Montauban
- Canton: Tarn-Tescou-Quercy vert

Government
  - Mayor (2020–2026): Michel Regambert
- Area^{1}: 22.69 km^{2} (8.76 sq mi)
- Elevation: 185 m (607 ft)
- Highest elevation: 220 m (720 ft)
- Lowest elevation: 110 m (360 ft)
- Population (2023): 569
  - Density: 25.1/km^{2} (64.9/sq mi)
- Time zone: UTC+01:00 (CET)
  - Summer (DST): UTC+02:00 (CEST)
- INSEE/Postal code: 82192 /82230
- ^{1} French Land Register data, which excludes lakes, ponds, glaciers > 1 km^{2} (0.386 sq mi or 247 acres) and river estuaries.

Verlhac-Tescou (French pronunciation: [vɛʁljak tɛsku]; Occitan: Verlhac) is a commune in the Tarn-et-Garonne department in the Occitanie region in southern France.

== See also ==
- Communes of the Tarn-et-Garonne department
