= Canton of Tarn-Tescou-Quercy vert =

Coordinates: 43.92°N 1.36°E

The canton of Tarn-Tescou-Quercy vert is an administrative division of the Tarn-et-Garonne department, in southern France. It was created at the French canton reorganisation which came into effect in March 2015. Its seat is in Labastide-Saint-Pierre.

It consists of the following communes:

1. Bruniquel
2. Corbarieu
3. Génébrières
4. Labastide-Saint-Pierre
5. Léojac
6. Monclar-de-Quercy
7. Nohic
8. Orgueil
9. Puygaillard-de-Quercy
10. Reyniès
11. Saint-Nauphary
12. La Salvetat-Belmontet
13. Varennes
14. Verlhac-Tescou
15. Villebrumier
