= Labastide-Saint-Pierre =

- Commune
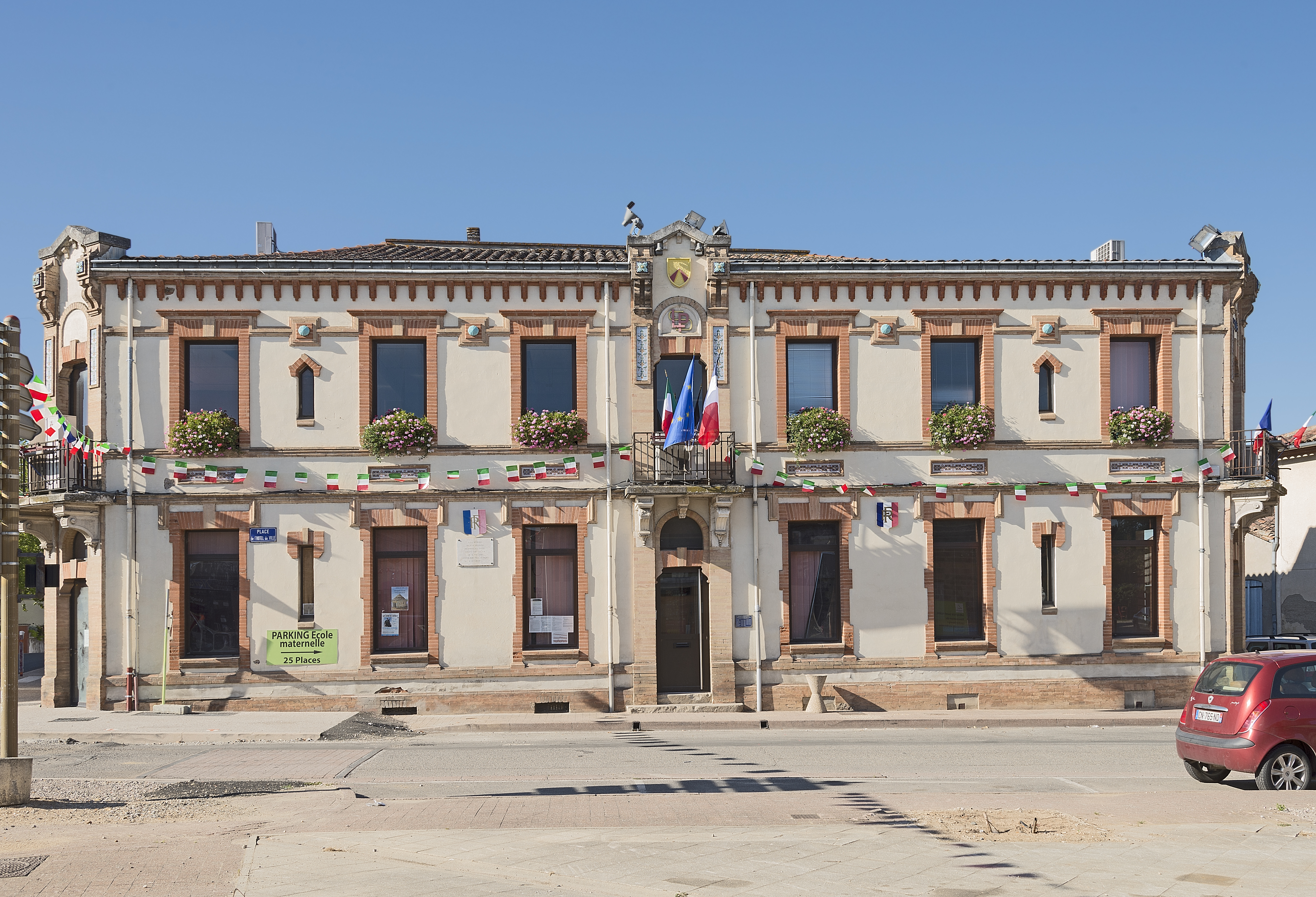
- Town hall

- Coat of arms
- Location of Labastide-Saint-Pierre
- Location within France Location within Occitanie
- Coordinates: 43°55′09″N 1°22′06″E
- Country: France
- Region: Occitania
- Department: Tarn-et-Garonne
- Arrondissement: Montauban
- Canton: Tarn-Tescou-Quercy vert
- Intercommunality: Grand Sud Tarn et Garonne

Government
  - Mayor (2020–2026): Jérome Beq
- Area^{1}: 20.64 km^{2} (7.97 sq mi)
- Elevation: 102 m (335 ft)
- Highest elevation: 119 m (390 ft)
- Lowest elevation: 75 m (246 ft)
- Population (2023): 3,745
  - Density: 181.4/km^{2} (469.9/sq mi)
- Time zone: UTC+01:00 (CET)
  - Summer (DST): UTC+02:00 (CEST)
- INSEE/Postal code: 82079 /82370
- ^{1} French Land Register data, which excludes lakes, ponds, glaciers > 1 km^{2} (0.386 sq mi or 247 acres) and river estuaries.

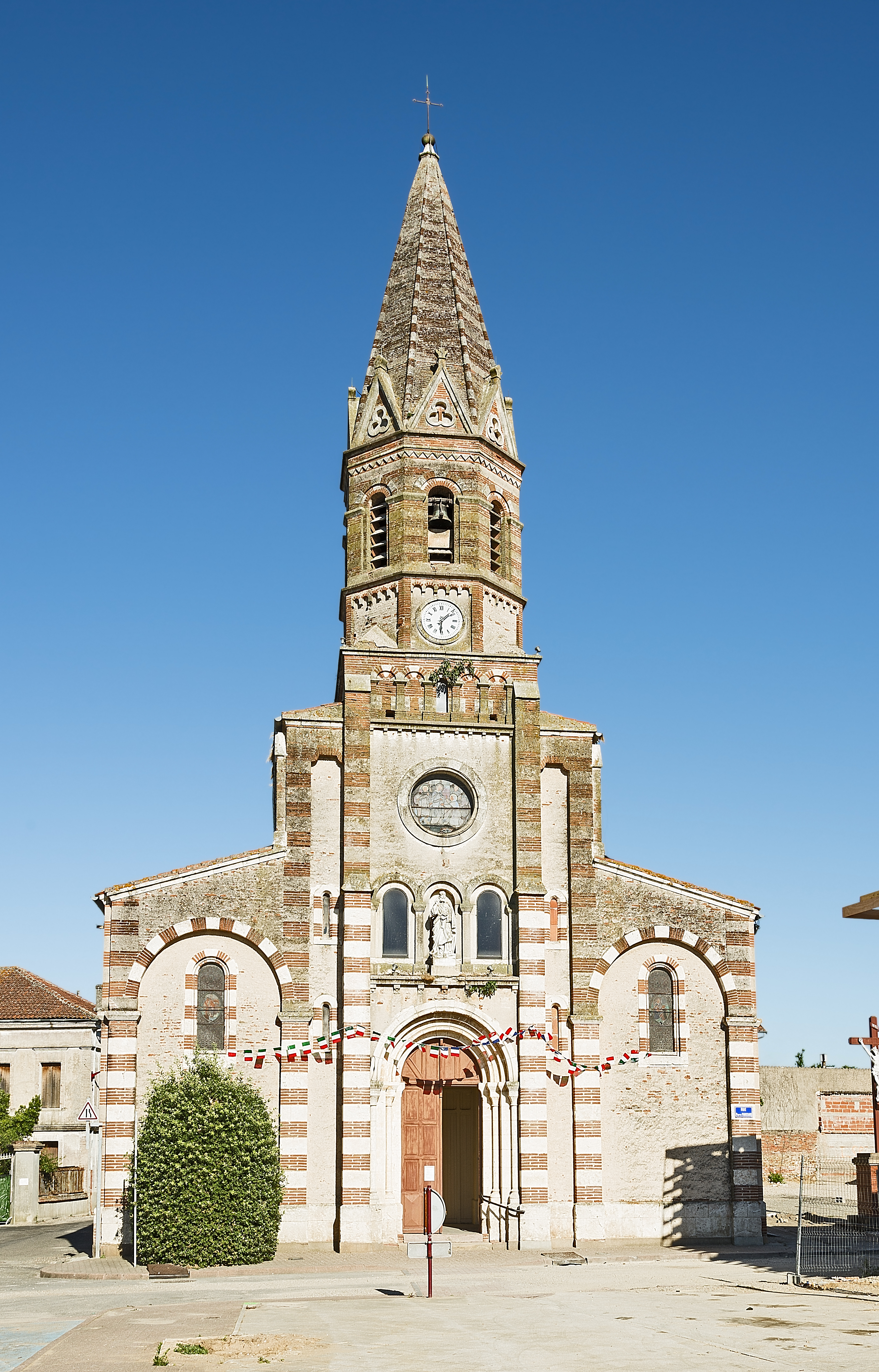
The church

Labastide-Saint-Pierre (French pronunciation: [labastid sɛ̃ pjɛʁ]; Languedocien: La Bastida Sent Pèire) is a commune in the Tarn-et-Garonne department in the Occitanie region in southern France.

== Population ==
Historical population
Year	Pop.	±% p.a.
1968	1,310	—
1975	1,848	+5.04%
1982	2,231	+2.73%
1990	2,653	+2.19%
1999	3,043	+1.54%
2007	3,539	+1.91%
2012	3,739	+1.11%
2017	3,742	+0.02%
2023	3,745	+0.01%
Source: INSEE

== See also ==
- Communes of the Tarn-et-Garonne department
