= Hean Tat Keh =

- Known for: Services marketing consumer behavior brand management marketing strategy

Academic background
- Education: University of Washington; Hong Kong University of Science and Technology; University of Macau

Academic work
- Discipline: Marketing
- Institutions: Monash University; University of Queensland; Peking University; National University of Singapore
- Website: https://research.monash.edu/en/persons/hean-tat-keh

Hean Tat Keh (simplified Chinese: 郭贤达; traditional Chinese: 郭賢達; pinyin: Guō Xiándá; Pe̍h-ōe-jī: Koeh Hiân-ta̍t) is a professor and former chair of the Department of Marketing at the Monash University Faculty of Business and Economics. He is known for his work on services marketing, consumer behavior, brand management, and marketing strategy. In particular, his research on services marketing addresses the limitations of the concepts of service inseparability and service intangibility. Keh has also published on the antecedents and consequences of brand equity. More recently, he has conducted research on sustainable marketing and healthcare marketing.

His research has been cited over 12,700 times according to Google Scholar, with an H-index of 44 and an i10-index of 63. Based on the three dimensions of productivity, impact, and quality of his research, ScholarGPS ranked Keh among the Top 1% of Marketing scholars worldwide in 2025.

== Education and career ==
Keh received his PhD in marketing from the University of Washington, MBA from the Hong Kong University of Science and Technology, and BBA Honours from the University of Macau.

Keh came to Australia as a full professor at the University of Queensland in 2011, before being recruited by Monash University in 2013. He is the immediate past chair of the Department of Marketing at the Monash University Faculty of Business and Economics, the first Asian-Australian to be appointed to this role.

Prior to Australia, he taught at the Guanghua School of Management, Peking University, and the NUS Business School. Earlier in his career, he gained corporate experience at The Wharf (Holdings), Hong Kong.

He is currently a member of the editorial board of the International Journal of Research in Marketing, Australasian Marketing Journal, and previously served as an associate editor of the Journal of Business Research.

In addition, Keh is a member of several advisory boards:

- Founding Advisory Board member of MKTBig15.com
- Academic Advisory Board member of the CMO Council.
- Academic Advisory Council member of Tsinghua University School of Economics and Management.

== Major awards ==
- ANZMAC Distinguished Marketing Researcher award 2019
- ANZMAC Distinguished Marketing Educator award 2018

Notably, Keh is one of only two academics to have received both the Distinguished Marketing Researcher and Distinguished Marketing Educator awards from ANZMAC.

== Selected publications ==
=== Journal articles ===
Keh has published over 50 journal articles. Based on the Financial Times list of Top 50 journals, Keh has published the following articles:

- Liu, Maggie Wenjing; Huang, Junhui; Fu, Dingsheng; Keh, Hean Tat (2026). "How human presence in environmental images shapes sustainable behaviors". Journal of the Academy of Marketing Science. doi:10.1007/s11747-026-01180-2.
- Yan, Li; Keh, Hean Tat; Murray, Kyle B. (2024). "Feeling the values: How pride and awe differentially enhance consumers' sustainable behavioral intentions". Journal of the Academy of Marketing Science. 52 (1): 75–96. doi:10.1007/s11747-023-00928-4.
- Keh, Hean Tat; Wang, Di; Yan, Li (2021). "Gimmicky or effective? The effects of imaginative displays on customers' purchase behavior". Journal of Marketing. 85 (5): 109–127. doi:10.1177/0022242921997359. S2CID 233943216.
- Yan, Li; Keh, Hean Tat; Chen, Jiemiao (2021). "Assimilating and differentiating: The curvilinear effect of social class on green consumption". Journal of Consumer Research. 47 (6): 914–936. doi:10.1093/jcr/ucaa041.
- Ding, Ying; Keh, Hean Tat (2017). "Consumer reliance on intangible versus tangible attributes in service evaluation: The role of construal level". Journal of the Academy of Marketing Science. 45 (6): 848–865. doi:10.1007/s11747-017-0527-8. S2CID 168964738.
- Pang, Jun; Keh, Hean Tat; Li, Xiuping; Maheswaran, Durairaj (2017). ""Every coin has two sides": The effects of dialectical thinking and attitudinal ambivalence on psychological discomfort and consumer choice". Journal of Consumer Psychology. 27 (2): 218–230. doi:10.1016/j.jcps.2016.10.001.
- Palmeira, Mauricio; Spassova, Gerri; Keh, Hean Tat (2015). "Other-serving bias in advice-taking: When advisors receive more credit than blame". Organizational Behavior and Human Decision Processes. 130 (Sep): 13–25. doi:10.1016/j.obhdp.2015.06.001.
- Torelli, Carlos J.; Ozsomer, Aysegul; Carvalho, Sergio W.; Keh, Hean Tat; Maehle, Natalia (2012). "Brand concepts as representations of human values: Do cultural congruity and compatibility between values matter?". Journal of Marketing. 76 (4): 92–108. doi:10.1509/jm.10.0400. S2CID 14063358.
- Sun, Jin; Keh, Hean Tat; Lee, Angela Y. (2012). "The effect of attribute alignability on service evaluation: The moderating role of uncertainty". Journal of Consumer Research. 39 (4): 831–847. doi:10.1086/665983. S2CID 56538859.
- Keh, Hean Tat; Pang, Jun (2010). "Customer reactions to service separation". Journal of Marketing. 74 (2): 55–70. doi:10.1509/jm.74.2.55. S2CID 220582315.
- Wang, Wenbo; Keh, Hean Tat; Bolton, Lisa E. (2010). "Lay theories of medicine and a healthy lifestyle". Journal of Consumer Research. 37 (1): 80–97. doi:10.1086/649772. S2CID 14380022.
- Bolton, Lisa E.; Keh, Hean Tat; Alba, Joseph W. (2010). "How do price fairness perceptions differ across culture?". Journal of Marketing Research. 47 (3): 564–576. doi:10.1509/jmkr.47.3.564. S2CID 146141465.
- Keh, Hean Tat; Nguyen, Thi Tuyet Mai; Ng, Hwei Ping (2007). "The effects of entrepreneurial orientation and marketing information on the performance of SMEs". Journal of Business Venturing. 22 (4): 592–611. doi:10.1016/j.jbusvent.2006.05.003.
- Keh, Hean Tat; Foo, Maw Der; Lim, Boon Chong (2002). "Opportunity evaluation under risky conditions: The cognitive processes of entrepreneurs". Entrepreneurship Theory and Practice. 27 (2): 125–148. doi:10.1111/1540-8520.00003. S2CID 144010815.

=== Books ===
- Lovelock, C.; Wirtz, J.; 郭贤达; 陆雄文 (2007). 服务营销（亚洲版·第2 版） (2 ed.). 中国人民大学出版社. ISBN 978-7-300-08303-2.
- 郭贤达; 蒋炯文 (2006). 战略市场营销—经理人精要指南. 北京大学出版社. ISBN 9787301111246.
- Lovelock, C.; Wirtz, J.; Keh, Hean Tat; Lu, Xiongwen (2005). Services Marketing in Asia: Managing People, Technology and Strategy, 2nd ed (2 ed.). Prentice-Hall. ISBN 0131275372.
- Keh, Hean Tat; Chiang, Jeongwen (2004). Strategic Asian Marketing: An Essential Guide for Managers. Prentice-Hall. ISBN 978-9812445650.
