= Monash University shooting =

2002 mass shooting in Melbourne, Australia

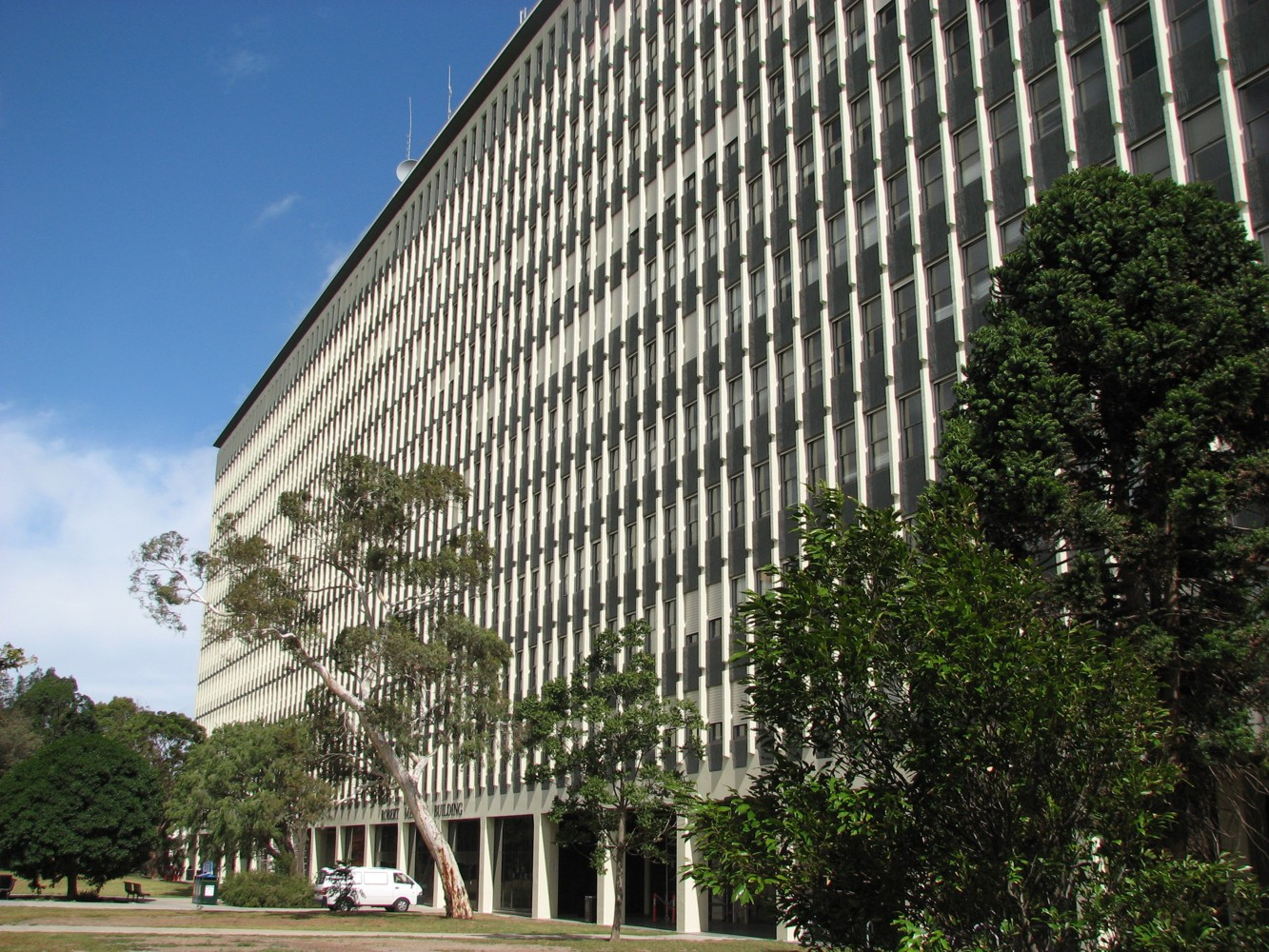
- Exterior of Menzies Building, site of the shooting
- Location: 37.9127°S 145.1326°E; Monash University, Clayton, Victoria, Australia
- Date: 21 October 2002; 24 years ago 11:24 a.m. (UTC+10)
- Attack type: Mass shooting, school shooting, double murder
- Weapons: CZ-75 9mm handgun; Smith & Wesson .357 Magnum 6-shot revolver (unused); Smith & Wesson .38-caliber 5-shot revolver (unused); Beretta 89 .22-caliber handgun (unused); Beretta Tomcat .32-caliber handgun (unused); Taurus PT100 .40-caliber handgun (unused)
- Deaths: 2
- Injuries: 5
- Perpetrator: Huan Yun "Allen" Xiang
- Motive: Delusions of persecution by victim

The Monash University shooting occurred on 21 October 2002, when a 36-year-old international student killed students William Wu and Steven Chan, both 26, and injured five others during a mass shooting at Monash University in Melbourne. The gunman, Huan Yun Xiang, was acquitted of murder charges stemming from the shootings due to mental impairment, and is currently under psychiatric care. Several of the people present in the room of the shootings were officially commended for their bravery in tackling Xiang and ending the shooting.

== Shooting ==
At 11:24 a.m. on 21 October 2002, Huan Yun "Allen" Xiang (向环云 Xiàng Huányún), a fourth-year commerce student at the university, entered room E 659 of the Menzies Building on Monash's Clayton campus in an econometrics class containing twelve students. Xiang climbed onto a desk and opened fire with a handgun from a standing position. People in the classroom were initially confused by the noise and by Xiang screaming, "You never understand me!"

When Xiang stopped shooting and moved to switch weapons, Lee Gordon-Brown, the classroom lecturer who was among those shot and wounded, grabbed Xiang's hands as he reached into his jacket. Gordon-Brown and a student in the room, Alastair Boast, then tackled him. Bradley Thompson later entered the room and discovered five guns in holsters around Xiang's waist, including two Berettas, a Taurus, and two revolvers, as well as two magazines from near his hip.

Gordon-Brown and Boast were assisted by a passing lecturer from a nearby room, Brett Inder, in restraining Xiang for thirty minutes until police arrived, while Thompson and university administrator Colin Thornby provided first aid. They both received Red Cross "Community Hero" awards for their assistance. At least one injured student reportedly left the room and sought help for his injuries from security staff.

Xiang was deemed by police to be unfit for interview but wrote a note referring to William Wu after his arrest saying, "I finally ended WW's life." All classes in the Menzies Building were cancelled for the rest of the day and the university set up counselling stations.

== Victims ==
Seven people were shot, resulting in two dead and five injured. The dead were Xu Hui "William" Wu, an international student from Hong Kong and neighbour of Xiang's in Melbourne; and Yat Ming "Steven" Chan, a student from Doncaster. The injured were lecturer Lee Gordon-Brown, who was shot in the arm and knee; student Daniel Urbach, who was wounded in the shoulder and arm; student Laurie Brown, who was wounded in the leg and abdomen; student Christine Young, who was shot in the face; and student Leigh Dat Huynh, who was shot in the leg and discharged from hospital within a day.

== Trial and post-trial ==
Xiang pleaded not guilty before his trial to two counts of murder and five of attempted murder on account of mental impairment. A Cantonese interpreter was required during the proceedings.

During his two-day trial in June 2004, prosecutor Sue Pullen presented evidence that Xiang felt the killings were his destiny. Evidence showed that Xiang had joined the Sporting Shooters Association of Australia in April 2002, and gained a handgun licence in June 2002. One lecturer, Gael M. Martin, told the court that she had expressed concerns about his mental state a week prior to the shootings. Evidence was offered that he harboured delusional beliefs that William Wu was an "agent of evil" and would "destroy him academically", and that his actions on 21 October 2002 focused on fulfilling a perceived destiny to kill Wu.

The defence and prosecution in Xiang's trial agreed that he suffered from a paranoid delusional disorder. The prosecution asked the jury to find him not guilty. On 17 June 2004 the Victorian Supreme Court jury found him not guilty of the murder of Wu and Chan and of the attempted murder of five other people in the tutorial room due to mental impairment. Justice Bernard Teague ordered Xiang be transferred to the Thomas Embling psychiatric hospital. He may be held there for as long as 25 years.

On 20 October 2015, while being treated, Xiang used a knife to attack a female consultant psychiatrist at Thomas Embling Hospital, where he had been incarcerated. He was sentenced to an additional 7 ^{1}/_{2} years in psychiatric custody in December 2016.

== Responses ==
=== Memorials ===
On 22 October 2002, the day after the shooting, flags on Clayton campus flew at half mast, and a graffiti artist wrote "Life is short. Cherish your friends. Love one another. R.I.P." on a campus billboard. On the first anniversary of the shootings, 21 October 2003, a day of reflection was held on Clayton campus. There is now a memorial (behind the campus's Matheson Library) to the victims.

William Wu and Steven Chan were posthumously awarded honours degrees by Monash University.

=== Media ===
Early media coverage focused on Xiang's limited English skills and resulting difficulties communicating as possible contributing factors to his decisions.

There was also editorial coverage arguing both for and against additional legal restrictions on handguns being introduced in Australia.

Shooting massacres in Australia and other English-speaking countries often occurred close together in time. Forensic psychiatrists attribute this to copycat behaviour, which is in many cases triggered by sensational media treatment. Mass murderers study media reports and imitate the actions and equipment that are sensationalised in them. The Monash shooting occurred at the height of publicity for the Beltway sniper attacks, which was extremely prominent from 3 October to the arrest of the perpetrators on 24 October 2002, three days after the Monash shootings.

=== Gun ownership laws ===
The then Prime Minister of Australia, John Howard, initiated another review of Australian gun laws, the last having been after the Port Arthur massacre, after it was discovered that Xiang had acquired his firearms legally. The Victorian State Government prepared new laws doubling the punishment for misuse of handguns and introducing new laws against trafficking in handguns after the shooting, and all other states followed.

The National Handgun Buyback Act 2003 put new restrictions on maximum calibre, magazine capacity and minimum barrel lengths for handguns held on a Category H sport/target shooting licence. Victoria began its handgun buyback scheme in August 2003.

=== Bravery awards ===
Lee Gordon-Brown, Alastair Boast, Brett Inder, Bradley Thompson, Andrew Swann and Colin Thornby all received bravery awards for their part in restraining Xiang and helping injured victims. The Royal Humane Society awarded Gordon-Brown the 2005 Stanhope Gold Medal, the highest Commonwealth award for bravery. In addition The Royal Humane Society of Australasia (RHSA) awarded him the 2004 Clarke Gold Medal of the RHSA and he was awarded the Star of Courage, the second highest award for bravery in the Australian honours system. The RHSA awarded Alastair Boast the Gold Medal of the RHSA.

== See also ==
- List of mass shootings in Australia
