= Villebrumier =

- Commune
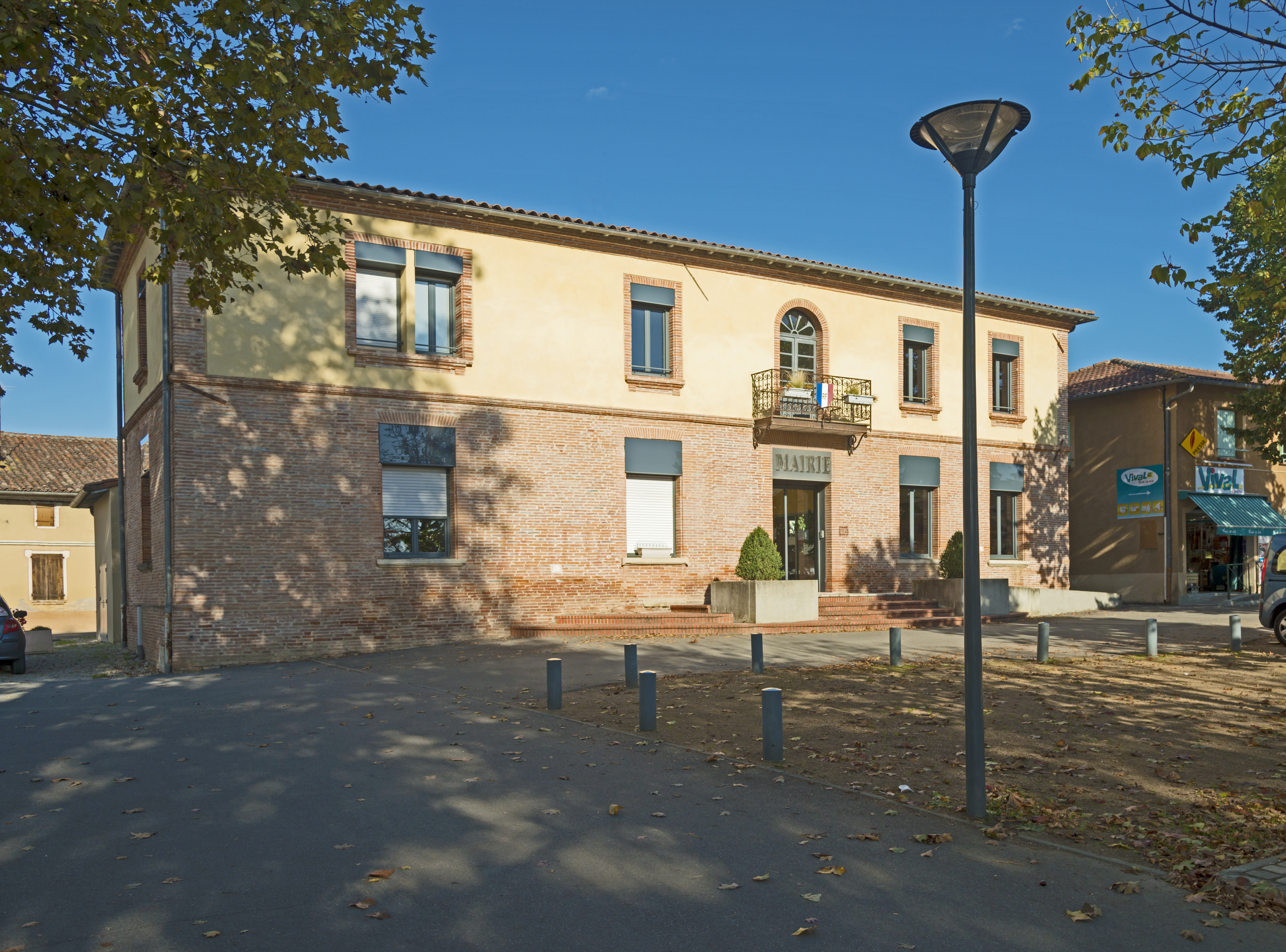
- The town hall of Villebrumier

- Coat of arms
- Location of Villebrumier
- Location within France Location within Occitanie
- Coordinates: 43°54′27″N 1°27′14″E
- Country: France
- Region: Occitania
- Department: Tarn-et-Garonne
- Arrondissement: Montauban
- Canton: Tarn-Tescou-Quercy vert

Government
  - Mayor (2022–2026): Pierre Blanc
- Area^{1}: 11.38 km^{2} (4.39 sq mi)
- Elevation: 90 m (300 ft)
- Highest elevation: 201 m (659 ft)
- Lowest elevation: 75 m (246 ft)
- Population (2023): 1,348
  - Density: 118.5/km^{2} (306.8/sq mi)
- Time zone: UTC+01:00 (CET)
  - Summer (DST): UTC+02:00 (CEST)
- INSEE/Postal code: 82194 /82370
- ^{1} French Land Register data, which excludes lakes, ponds, glaciers > 1 km^{2} (0.386 sq mi or 247 acres) and river estuaries.

Villebrumier (French pronunciation: [vilbʁymje]; Occitan: Vilabrumièr) is a commune in the Tarn-et-Garonne department in the Occitanie region in southern France.

== Monuments ==
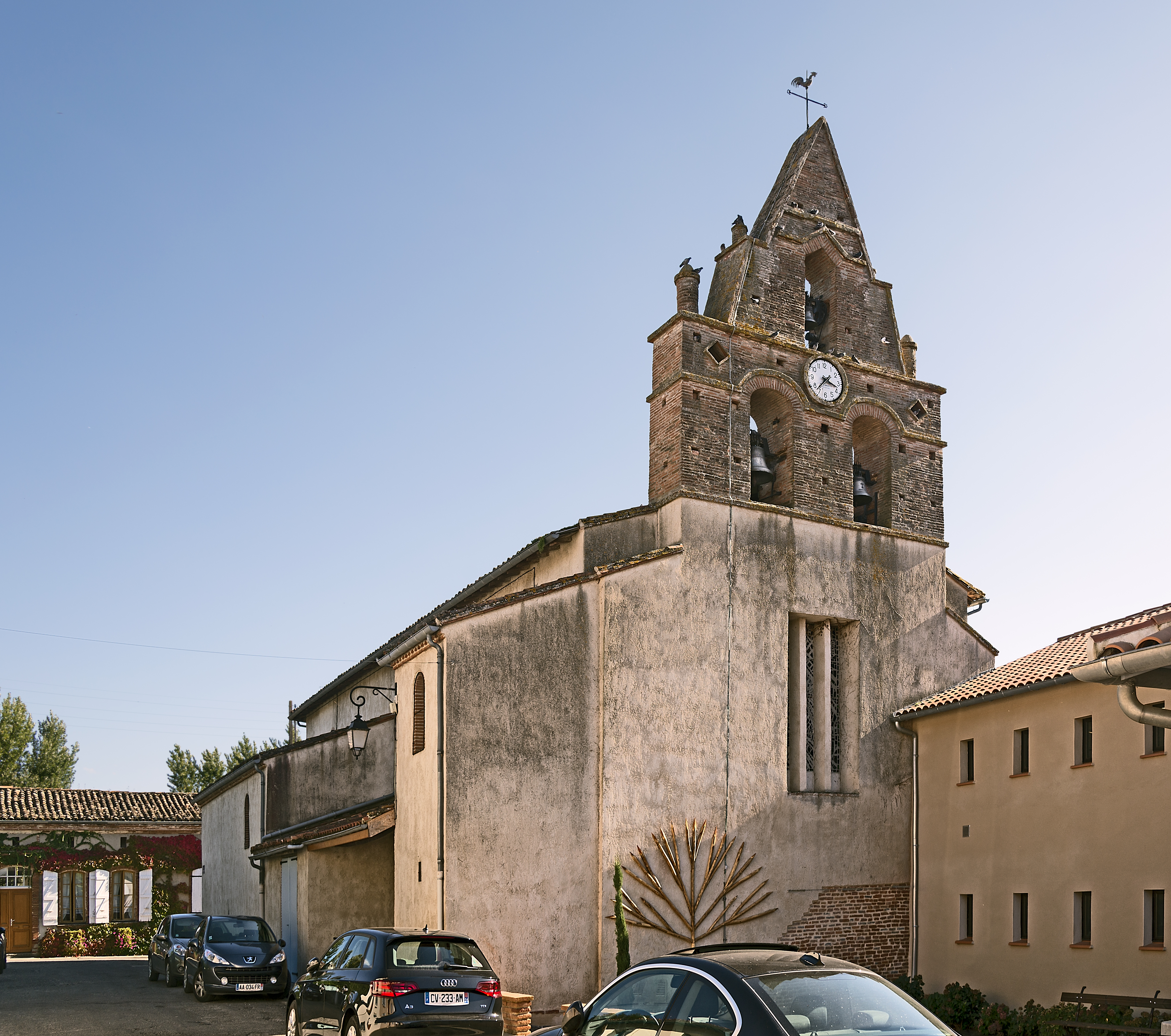
St. Theodard's church

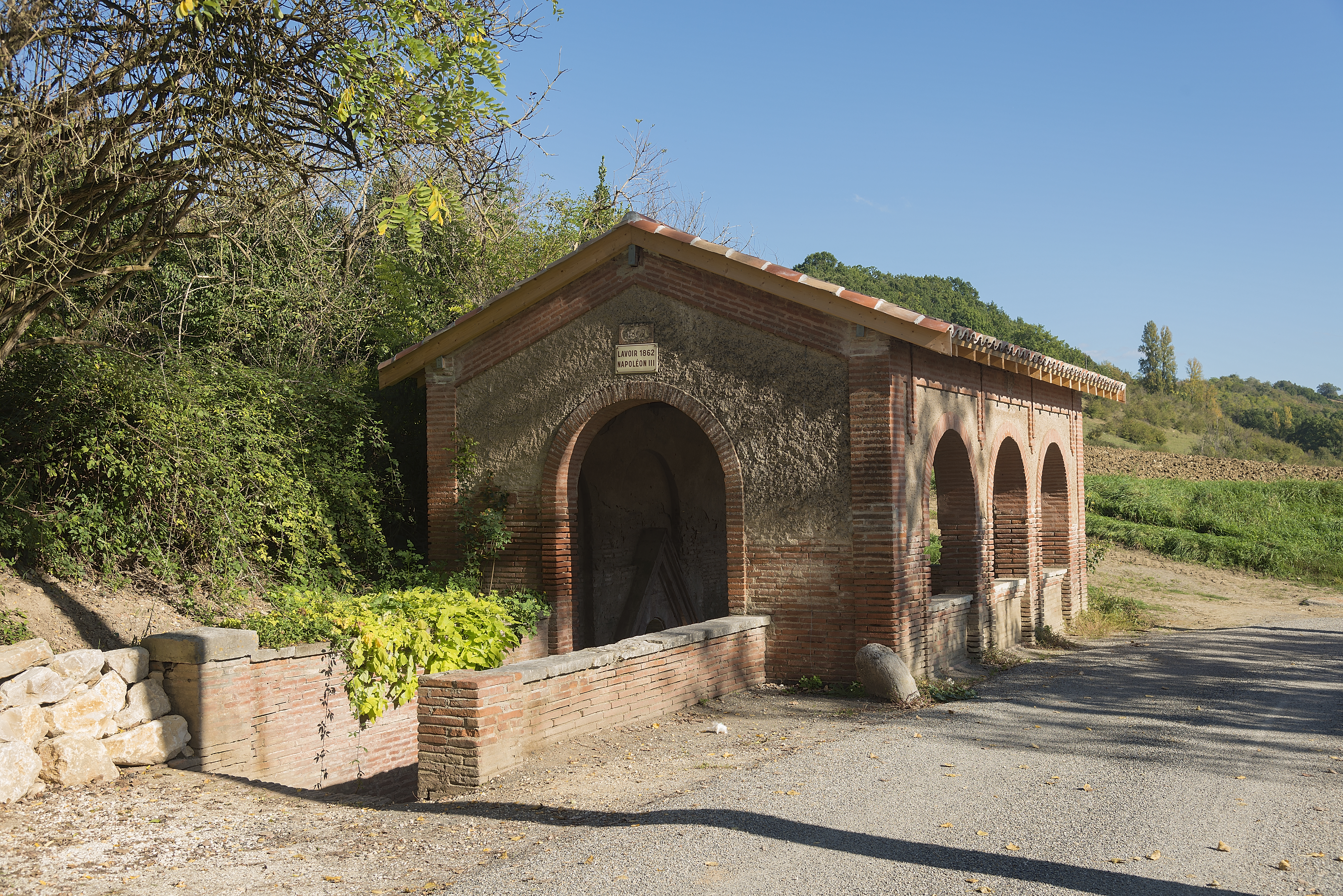
Laundry (1862)

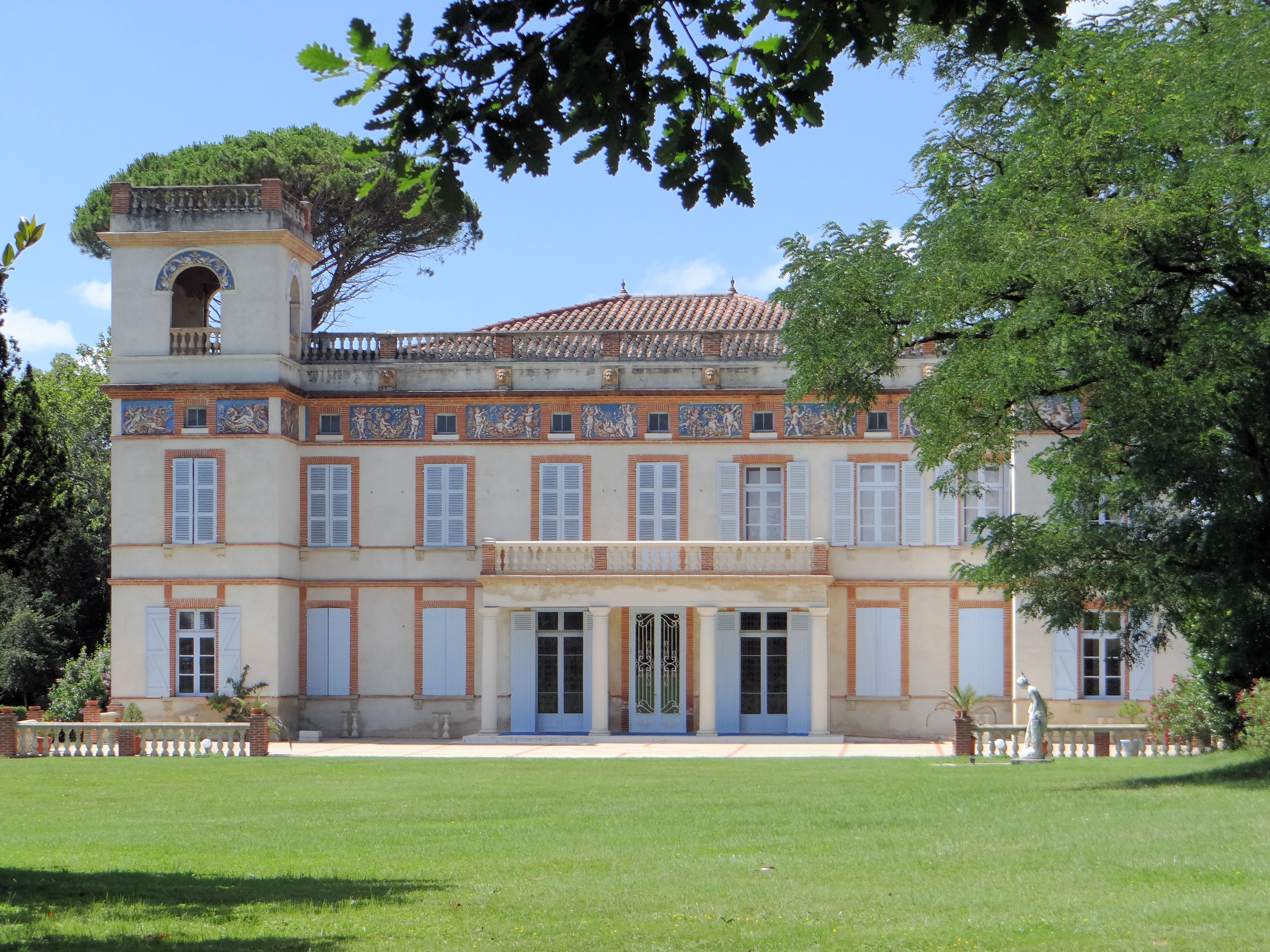
Castle of Villebrumier

== See also ==
- Communes of the Tarn-et-Garonne department
