= La Salvetat-Belmontet =

- Commune
- Location of La Salvetat-Belmontet
- Location within France Location within Occitanie
- Coordinates: 43°57′50″N 1°31′59″E
- Country: France
- Region: Occitania
- Department: Tarn-et-Garonne
- Arrondissement: Montauban
- Canton: Tarn-Tescou-Quercy vert

Government
  - Mayor (2020–2026): Bernard Pezous
- Area^{1}: 18.63 km^{2} (7.19 sq mi)
- Elevation: 113 m (371 ft)
- Highest elevation: 222 m (728 ft)
- Lowest elevation: 114 m (374 ft)
- Population (2023): 993
  - Density: 53.3/km^{2} (138/sq mi)
- Time zone: UTC+01:00 (CET)
  - Summer (DST): UTC+02:00 (CEST)
- INSEE/Postal code: 82176 /82230
- ^{1} French Land Register data, which excludes lakes, ponds, glaciers > 1 km^{2} (0.386 sq mi or 247 acres) and river estuaries.

La Salvetat-Belmontet (French pronunciation: [la salvəta bɛlmɔ̃tɛ]; Languedocien: La Salvetat e Bèlmontet) is a commune in the Tarn-et-Garonne department in the Occitanie region in southern France.

== See also ==
- Communes of the Tarn-et-Garonne department
