= Inseparability =

Qualify of services different from goods

Inseparability is a term used in marketing to describe a key quality of services as distinct from goods, namely the characteristic that a service has which renders it impossible to divorce the supply or production of the service from its consumption. Other key characteristics of services include perishability, intangibility and variability (or heterogeneity).

Although the notion of inseparability has become received wisdom in the marketing and services marketing literature over the past few decades, more recent research has challenged inseparability as a distinguishing characteristic of services.

== Developments in research ==
Lovelock and Gummesson (2004, p. 29) conceptually argue that "there is a large group of separable services that do not involve the customer directly, with the result that production and consumption need not be simultaneous". Examples of such separated services include freight transportation, dry cleaning, and routine maintenance on a wide array of equipment and facilities. Lovelock and Gummesson (2004) conclude that only one category of services — physical acts to customers' bodies, such as a haircut or medical examination — is inseparate. In the other three categories (i.e., physical acts to owned objects, nonphysical acts to customers’ minds, and processing of information), consumption can be separated from production, if so desired and designed into the system. Thus, inseparability is not effective as a distinguishing characteristic of services in general.

In the first empirical investigation, Keh and Pang (2010) defined service separation as "customers' absence from service production, which denotes the spatial separation between service production and consumption". They showed that service separation increases customers’ perceptions of not only access convenience and benefit convenience, but also performance risk and psychological risk. Subsequent research has investigated applications of service separation in a variety of contexts, including smart interactive services, telehealth, and higher (online) education.
