= Next-best-action marketing =

Purported marketing strategy

Next-best-action marketing (also known as best next action or next best activity or recommended action) is a customer-centric marketing approach that considers the different actions that can be taken for a specific customer and decides on the ‘best’ one.

The "next best action" (an offer, proposition, service, etc.) is determined by the customer's interests and needs, and the marketing organization's business objectives and policies. This is in sharp contrast to traditional marketing approaches that first create a proposition for a product or service and then attempt to find interested and eligible prospects for that proposition.

== Enabling technology ==
Since early this century, the technology has been available to allow a company to achieve next-best-action capabilities in high volumes as well as in real-time.

Another approach to next-best-action is using machine learning to access the impact of specific activities on Consumer Experience (CX) or measuring the impact of actions on latent affinity for brands or their products. It is widely understood that superior customer experience drives revenue growth. A CX based Next -Best-Action AI system can be developed and deployed at scale. A traditional measure of CX is the Net Promoter Score (NPS) introduced by Frederick Reichheld. Using supervised AI techniques where the desired outcome is a high CX, Next-Best-Action recommendation engine can be implemented.

== History ==
The Next Best Action paradigm is not new nor is it only applicable in marketing. A similar concept was suggested by John Boyd of the United States Airforce (OODA Loop). In a military context it describes thinking on the fly with distributed, local decision-making versus planned campaigns and objectives. In marketing it has only recently been possible to make decisions fast enough on an enterprise scale to build a ‘mini-business case’ in real-time, considering many courses of action before deciding on the best one.

From a business perspective, the rise of the next-best-action paradigm has in part been triggered by an increasing emphasis on inbound marketing. Organizations have found that volume in the inbound channels (web, call center, ATM, branch, etc.) is increasing in recent years, while outbound channels (direct mail, cold calling, etc.) are increasingly challenged. The reason for this is threefold: 1) customers have become less tolerant of receiving outbound marketing solicitations; 2) new regulations limit spam or spam-like activities, telemarketing calls and direct mail; and 3) customers are increasingly Internet savvy.

== Benefits and drawbacks ==
A first complication is that most companies are organized in a product-oriented way. This means that product managers have specific volume or revenue targets. Traditional campaign management is very much aligned with this. The Next Best Action paradigm, although capable of reflecting the same priorities, is normally used for bottom line optimization. Organizationally this means that different lines of business will need to collaborate to define next-best-action strategies, and goals may need to be reset to better reflect the customer-centric nature of the new processes. The second complication is its unpredictability. Although overall it will optimize the bottom line and have other attractive features (like built-in customer centricity), the ‘on the fly’ decision-making makes it harder to know in advance what the results will be. There are implications for supply chain management, staff incentive schemes, budgeting and service level agreements. Next-best-action strategies can be made predictable again by simulating them in advance.
