= Orgueil =

- Commune
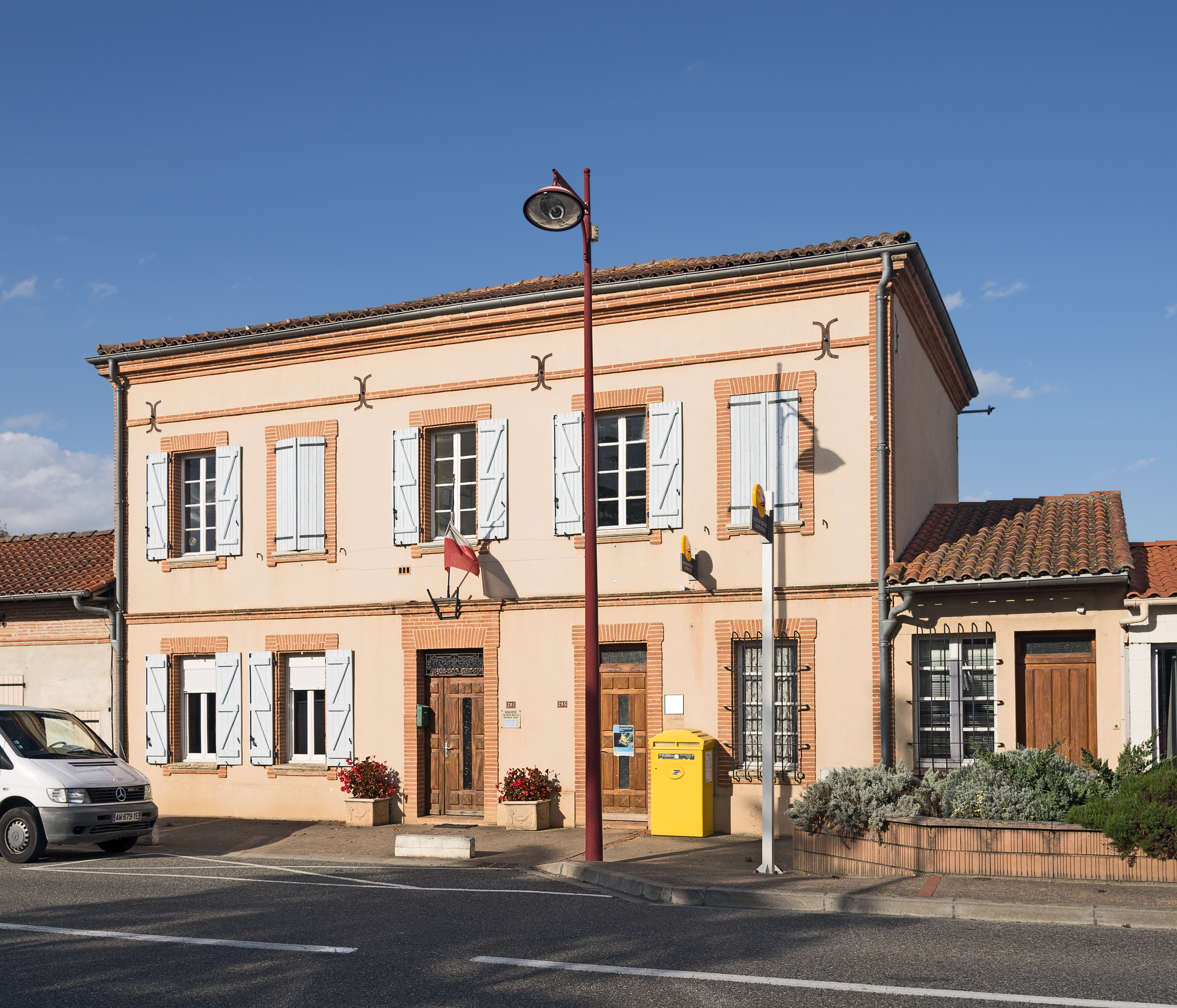
- The town hall of Orgueil

- Coat of arms
- Location of Orgueil
- Location within France Location within Occitanie
- Coordinates: 43°54′19″N 1°24′43″E
- Country: France
- Region: Occitania
- Department: Tarn-et-Garonne
- Arrondissement: Montauban
- Canton: Tarn-Tescou-Quercy vert
- Intercommunality: Grand Sud Tarn et Garonne

Government
  - Mayor (2020–2026): Willy Authesserre
- Area^{1}: 14.03 km^{2} (5.42 sq mi)
- Elevation: 102 m (335 ft)
- Highest elevation: 116 m (381 ft)
- Lowest elevation: 75 m (246 ft)
- Population (2023): 1,720
  - Density: 123/km^{2} (318/sq mi)
- Time zone: UTC+01:00 (CET)
  - Summer (DST): UTC+02:00 (CEST)
- INSEE/Postal code: 82136 /82370
- ^{1} French Land Register data, which excludes lakes, ponds, glaciers > 1 km^{2} (0.386 sq mi or 247 acres) and river estuaries.

Orgueil (French pronunciation: [ɔʁɡœj]; Occitan: Orgulh) is a commune in the Tarn-et-Garonne department in the Occitanie region in southern France.

== History ==
Orgueil has existed for more than 1000 years. It was first mentioned in the 9th century, when Orgueil was part of Saint-Sernin Abbaye in Toulouse.

On 14 May 1864 a rare carbonaceous chondrite meteorite landed there, now known as the Orgueil meteorite. For research purposes, it was split up into several pieces which can now be seen in museums in Europe and the United States. The Museum d'Histoire Naturelle of Montauban in Tarn-et-Garonne, France has a large piece of the meteorite that weighs eleven kilograms.

== Economy ==
Orgueil is also a wine-producing region: the red grape le frontonnais is cultivated there.

== See also ==
- Communes of the Tarn-et-Garonne department
