= Gael M. Martin =

Australian statistician

Gael Margaret Martin FASSA is an Australian Bayesian econometrician, known for her work in simulation-based inference and time series analysis of non-Gaussian data. She is a professor of econometrics and business statistics at Monash University, an associate investigator in the Australian Research Council (ARC) Centre of Excellence for Mathematical and Statistical Frontiers, and a Fellow of the Academy of the Social Sciences in Australia.

Martin has a bachelor's degree from the University of Melbourne, and a second bachelor's, master's, and PhD from Monash University, completed in 1997 under the supervision of Grant Hillier. She was an ARC Future Fellow for 2010–2013, and was a keynote speaker at Bayes on the Beach 2017, a biennial Australian statistics conference.

She was the honours supervisor of Huan Yun Xiang, who killed two Monash students in 2002 in the Monash University shooting.
