= Intangibility =

Term in services marketing

Intangibility refers to the lack of palpable or tactile property making it difficult to assess service quality. According to Zeithaml et al. (1985, p. 33), “Because services are performances, rather than objects, they cannot be seen, felt, tasted, or touched in the same manner in which goods can be sensed.” As a result, intangibility has historically been seen as the most important distinction between services and products in the literature on services marketing. Other key characteristics of services include perishability, inseparability and variability (or heterogeneity).

However, in practice service production and consumption often involve both intangible and tangible elements. Examples of intangible service attributes include service responsiveness and reliability, while tangible service attributes include the servicescape, décor, and furnishings.

Drawing on construal level theory, Ding and Keh (2017) investigated when and why intangible versus tangible attributes would be more influential in service evaluation. They showed that, under a high construal level, consumers rely more on intangible attributes in their service evaluation and choice formation; whereas under a low construal level, consumers rely more on tangible attributes in their service evaluation and choice. Furthermore, the effect of construal level on service evaluation can be explained by imagery vividness, and these effects are moderated by the type of service (e.g., experience vs. credence services).

== Marketing implications ==
When a customer is buying a service, they perceive a risk related to the purchase. In order to reassure the buyer and build their confidence, marketing strategists need to give tangible proofs of service quality. In addition, there is evidence that certain service industries already apply intangibilization versus tangibilization strategies as a function of construal level. For example, firms selling retirement insurance policies often target young workers who are a few decades away from retirement. Their advertising seeks to convey to the viewer ideas about retirement based on their insurance services and tends to use taglines that highlight company longevity and company reputation. Moreover, service firms should consider their physical distance from their customers. For example, a community shopping center should emphasize its tangible attributes such as accessibility of location and variety of stores. In contrast, a catalog or mail order retailer that does not have a physical outlet should emphasize intangible attributes such as responsive service and assurance of product delivery to attract customers.
