= Referral economy =

Referral (re•fer•ral /rɪˈfɜrəl/, “an act or instance of referring”) economy is a system where people help and trust each other by sharing their experiences about a product. The keystone of its function is confidence: "92% of respondents trusted referrals from people they knew" - Nielsen. This normally happens among friends, which enhances the value of the recommendation, since there are no trade interests.

This new economy has produced the growth of platforms such as Referral Factory and ReferralRock, which offers a small remuneration to those people whose references generate a further outlay of money.

A recent Nielsen study found that 84 percent of global respondents trust word-of-mouth recommendations from friends and family, making highly trusted among digital and traditional methods of receiving recommendations.

== Range ==
The referral economy affects every platform or social event where people share their interests. It scopes from blogs to social networks or community pages. Moreover, 65% of new business comes from referrals, per the New York Times.

Referral programs are strategies focused on achieving references from customers with the purpose of implementing sales or spreading the company's image and existence. There are some examples of programs which have obtained results over the average:

- Dropbox is a file hosting service that offers cloud storage, file synchronization and client software. Despite Dropbox is not appealing as a product, it has been the main reason for discussion in many colloquial talks between friends and family all over the world. His referral program is well known and it is the key element of its actual company size.
- Uber - Referring a friend is done by opening the app and clicking the "email a friend" button.

Banks. When it comes to money issues where people have a special interest and care, they tend primarily to rely on friends and their recommendations of any bank, as these sources are the most trustworthy.

Social media. Around 55% of people consult these platforms prior to a purchase. In addition, the same entrepreneurs and employers register themselves into these online platforms. As for making marketing decisions, social networks have influenced considerably. 71% of buyers are influenced by the reviews found online when purchasing a product.

In general, a positive increment of 30% on Twitter is four times more effective in provoking additional sales than an increment of the 30% on existing regular advertising.

The top influential sites are: Facebook (30.8%), YouTube (27%), LinkedIn (27%), Google+ (20%), Pinterest (12%), and Twitter (8%).

Travel sites. An example is TripAdvisor, a portal whose original idea, according to its founder Stephen Kaufer, was to focus on opinions of reliable sources such as travel guides and magazines. However, the page had an option for users to add his own comment referring a place, and this rocketed. In a very short time, the page started to be full of people's reviews about their own experiences, surpassing in great number the professional recommendations from its beginnings.

In fact, 59% of users say these sites have the greatest influence on their booking decisions. Peter Shankman, author of the book Zombie Loyalists, says that "the next fifty years of the economy are going to be run by customer experience".

=== Barriers ===
In terms of references, SMEs (small and medium-sized entities) are the great forgotten. The natural process and the referral economy suggest a remuneration; though, while these small companies refer to others by a value of £7,500, almost half of them would not be willing to spend their time establishing a formal remuneration system because of its difficulty or simply because the gain is small. Other companies, a 28% see referencing as a natural process, considering then that it does not require any payment.

At the same time, about 45% of these businesses are reluctant to recommend a good service from others as they see them as potential competitors or just fearing to recommend something that turns out to be finally not good and which could cause the company's reputation to plummet.

When starting a commission structure with SMEs who recommend regularly, there are numerous difficulties.

== Measures ==
We measure in order to know if we are adding business value.

The evolution of social networks has taken place in a prohibitive pace. General behaviour tries to measure the impact that each user generates as well as the impact that they add within the economy. Yet, it is difficult to participate in an optimum way through this channel.

When it comes to relying on indicators to measure, what matters is not the number of followers or friends, nor the number of publications, but their acceptance by other consumers or companies. What really matters are indicators like the generated attention or the consequences produced such as a purchase or purely sharing a review.

Rates:

- Conversation rate measures the number of responses or comments that the audience made for each publication. It is promoted due to relevant discussions between users, by being proactive.
- Amplification rate takes into account the number of shares of each publication. When it comes to sharing information, the audience extends from the person who published it originally to whom has shared it later. This causes a spread of information which reaches potential future readers. In this way, the limitations of your initial range breaks up. Relationships are something that money can not buy in marketing.
- Applause rate measures the amount of likes per publication and clearly illustrates the audience preferences.
- Economic value basically consists on the sum of short and long term revenue and cost savings. Despite the measures explained above, it is also necessary to estimate the value produced by the references. It is a strategy carried out by the companies - which are tools to make money - so there is a lucrative purpose in referencing behind all.

== Benefits ==
There are some remarkable benefits in using referral programs as part of a company communication strategy:

- References are cheap in terms of return on investment. Compared with the sales they produce, which are as valuable as an advertising campaign, its cost is very small. What's more, friend-to-friend referrals are actually among the most appreciated sales canals.
- Referrals build businesses; businesses build referrals. Doing a great effort for your customers, they will appreciate it in terms of repeating with a company and also referencing, thereby expanding your customer network.
- Referral marketing goes viral. If one customer is pleased, he recommends the service or product to another. Referrals have an inclination to build up on themselves.
- Referral marketing doesn't end online. Despite the effect created through social media recommendations, brand envoys develop a crucial role to reach clients networks.
- Referrals are teachable. By the simple process of soliciting your clientele to refer after the company have performed great. Because of it, when the customer listens to someone's need, he will mention you.
- Referral marketing is easy to measure and optimize. Track how successful your program is and the ways in which you can regulate to attract a higher rate of sales, is easy given the social nature of referral marketing online.
- Referral marketing builds trust. Accepting a recommendation for a friend is common and you do not even ask more about it. An example of a business based on reliance is eBay, where customer reviews are the key belief factor.
