= Square-inch analysis =

Square-inch analysis is a method used by direct marketers to evaluate the profitability of the offers appearing in the pages of a mail-order catalog. The results of square-inch analysis are used to improve the process of assigning merchandise offers to pages and allocating space in future catalogs, a process called page planning or pagination.

== Theory ==
Direct marketing businesses must record the revenues and profits received from merchandise sales in order to satisfy basic legal requirements and calculate tax liabilities. Sales of individual items must be tracked in order to fulfill customer orders and manage inventories. As a result, the gross profit and profit margin for each item sold can be calculated as a means of determining which items are most profitable to the business and its owners.

The costs of producing and distributing mail-order catalogs can also be measured. These costs include graphic design, copywriting, photography, print production, postage, and mailing list rental. These costs are typically tracked and totaled for entire publications, rather than for individual items of merchandise offered for sale on the pages of the publication. Square-inch analysis provides the means of allocating these costs to individual items according to the amount of space their sales offers occupy on pages, on a percentage basis (as measured in square inches).

=== History ===
Space-based analysis of profitability of individual items originated with self-service retail stores. This method of analysis was applied to mail-order catalogs starting in the 1990s, when the popularity of mail-order shopping rose sharply and direct marketers sought to increase their profitability. One of the earliest mentions of this technique in published articles was in 1996. The principles have remained largely unchanged to the present day, but the increasing complexity of interaction between marketing channels (direct mail, mass media, internet, retail) and sales channels (postal, telephone, internet, retail) make precise space-based profitability analyses of merchandise offers more and more difficult to obtain.

=== Rationale ===
The planning stages of catalog production involve assigning merchandise offers and their space allocations to pages in a publication of finite size. Based on an assumption that increased exposure leads to increased customer response, direct marketers seeking to maximize profits will choose to increase the exposure of their more profitable items by increasing the amount of space allocated to their offers. Square-inch analysis provides a means of normalizing the basis on which the profitability of published offers can be compared.

=== Place in direct marketing cycle ===
Since square-inch analysis is derived from spatial measurements taken from published offers and actual sales results produced by those offers, it is normally undertaken at the conclusion of one promotional publication cycle, and before the beginning of the next. As a part of a larger discipline of marketing analytics, it might be seen as an "optional extra" that follows other effectiveness measurements and precedes another cycle of strategic planning.

== Applications ==
Classic square-inch analysis was and still is used primarily by mail-order catalog publishers, because these vehicles contain multiple separate sales offers of varying size, and managers need a means of systematically subdividing aggregate publishing costs down to the individual item offer level. Printed offers in other formats (such as travel brochures, or magazine display ads) would also yield to this analysis. It has been suggested that square-inch analysis should play a role in website marketing analytics, but such use is not well documented.

=== Obtaining measurements ===
For the simplest of merchandise sales offers, the rectangular area on a page occupied by an item's illustration, its descriptive copy, its order number and price can be measured by hand with a ruler and the square area calculated by the formula width (inches) x height (inches) = area (square inches). A simpler, less accurate measure can be obtained using fractional page sizes (e.g. quarter page, half page). Measurements are tabulated for each item offered on each page. In certain design presentations which display offer-specific content in two or more areas (such as an illustration and descriptive copy on facing pages), each separate area is measured and the areas are summed for that item in the tabulation. When an offer occupying a discrete area on a page comprises more than one item in a grouping, the collective area is subdivided by the number of items in the grouping and the apportionments are entered into the tabulation for each item.

Non-offer areas such as front cover illustrations, postal address panels, indexes, order forms and editorial content are common in catalog designs. These areas can be treated individually in the same way as offers, or combined together with the space occupied by page margins, headlines, headers and footers and treated as "white space." A more conservative square-inch analysis proportionately subdivides the total of all "white space" and adds an apportionment to each item's offer area so that the cost of every square inch of space is accounted for.

With the emergence of software-assisted page planning, graphic design and page layout techniques, obtaining square-inch measurements has become at least partially automated. Software systems which store dimensional data related to sales offers as shown on page layouts should be capable of delivering the necessary area measurements for each item offered on each page in tabular form.

=== Obtaining sales data ===
The minimum data required for square-inch analysis consists of page number, unit sales volume, gross revenue, and gross profit for each item offered. Additional insights can be obtained from including unit return volume, unit of sale, merchandise category, style information or other descriptors in the sales data inputs to square-inch analysis. One common challenge for the business systems which record item sales data is relating it to the exact catalog page on which an item appeared. Another common challenge for business systems is identifying which sales were motivated specifically by a catalog offer.

=== Reporting ===
The fundamental quotient of square-inch analysis is item profit per square inch according to the formula item gross profit (dollars) / offer area (square inches) = item profit per square inch. Secondary calculations include unit volume per square inch, item revenue per square inch, gross profit and revenue per offer and per page. The elementary mathematical formulas involved in deriving the results of square-inch analysis can be easy modeled by formulas in a software spreadsheet. Support for page planning decisions requires that these results be numerically sortable.

Businesses who utilize direct marketing can take this reporting a step further by applying design of experiments methodology. The direct marketer can create "look alike" control groups (selected from the qualified mail population using random sampling techniques) to calculate the incremental revenue per square inch. This is important because the marketer can understand the influence the direct marketing had on the customer's purchase decision. The challenge is the business must allocate a significant quantity of customers to the holdout control group to ensure results are statistically significant and the insights can be expected in future direct mail campaigns.

=== Automation ===
With the emergence of sophisticated software-assisted catalog publishing systems, square-inch analysis has become at least partially automated. As of 2012, at least six publishing systems claim to provide some form of square-inch analysis capability, and at least two are known to have been created primarily for this purpose.
