= Perishability =

Perishability is used in marketing to describe the way in which service capacity cannot be stored for sale in the future. It is a key concept of services marketing.

Other key characteristics of services include intangibility, inseparability, fluctuating demand, pricing of services, heterogeneity and variability.
