= Science-to-business marketing =

Science-to-business marketing (S2B marketing) entails the marketing of research conducted at research institutions, particularly universities, to industry or other interested parties. The acronym S2B follows a series of marketing acronyms used to shorten and popularise marketing specialisations, including (B2C) (business-to-consumer marketing) and (B2B) (business-to-business marketing).

== Introduction to science-to-business marketing ==
Science-to-Business (S2B) Marketing aims at the use of marketing principles for the area of science, supporting the successful commercialisation of research competencies, capacities and results from a research institution to its research customers. The objective thereby is to develop, test and provide new models, instruments and proceedings for research commercialisation that enable universities and research institutions to market their research more effectively. The approach uses existing instruments from Business to Business Marketing, Service Marketing and Technology & Innovation Marketing.

The special feature of S2B Marketing is the determination of the market, in particular, industry, as the starting point for all research activities. S2B is generally focused on technology-intensive departments but can also be applied in all disciplines of research. The industry engaged in research and development is identified as the key target market. This leads to research customers, who are willing to pay for scientific research, being the centre of consideration.

== Research impact – the need for science / industry interaction ==
Today's marketplace is characterised by increased competition, rapid change and a shift towards knowledge-based economies. This development is fostered by factors such as rapid technological developments, globalisation and the maturing of domestic markets. With innovation enabling an economy's success under these conditions, research has become a key driver in economic performance. An extensive outsourcing of research to specialised institutions such as universities has resulted in an increased number of linkages between industry entities and universities. These relationships and commercialisation projects provide a great potential to foster innovation, leading to a need to pay particular attention to the management of technology commercialisation processes.

In the last decade, both private organisations as well as public institutions have increased their combined efforts to foster the transfer of knowledge, in order to respond to the rapid change in their competitive landscapes and the worldwide speed of innovation. Especially, the great significance of innovation is regarded as the catalyst for an extended orientation towards University-Industry-Relationships. Taken into consideration the global tendency towards a decrease in public research funding, the commercialisation of scientific research is one of the most critical challenges for innovative research and development. For the purpose of establishing efficient collaborations between industrial and entrepreneurial partners, researchers are required to incorporate the service dimension of their scientific work more strongly. S2B Marketing thereby helps to successfully commercialise research and strengthens the linkage between research organisations and industry.

== Organisations involved in science-to-business marketing ==
Essentially there are two main actors in the commercialisation process: research institutions and industry or government departments interested in purchasing research outcomes or capabilities.

1. Research organisations build closer links with industry in order to:

- commercialise research
- allow academics to gain relevant industry experience in order to make their research more relevant to society
- generate additional income for further research and education through commercial returns
- improve their market-oriented acting and thinking
- motivate and provide incentive to staff and students through more stimulating and relevant work and the provision of alternate career paths

2. Industry engages research institutions for a number of reasons:

- the successful innovation of new products and services into the marketplace provide significant profits and growth opportunities for new firms
- ever fiercer competition inevitably requires considerable efforts of both companies and universities in order to maintain competitiveness
- Business require innovation, however do not always have the ability of finances to undertake the required research
- Industry attempts to specifically benefits from:

- Access to public funds
- Access to university research results
- Access to university competencies and innovation capacity

- Research offers businesses the possibility to have tasks solved by a new, external perspective and by applying new methods resulting in an improvement of both the innovation and the business success of a company.
- Cooperation with universities enables companies to maintain or even improve competitiveness in dynamic market environments.

3. Furthermore, society benefits from the cooperation between research and industry in a number of ways:

- promote economic growth – without technological change, advancement in productivity and therefore GDP would be limited to increasing labour and material productivity, finite sources of improvement
- strengthen the regional economy
- commercialisation of research enables broader public access to resulting technologies, which in turn can transform lives.
- improvement of living standards requires improved technology

== Process of Science-to-Business Marketing ==
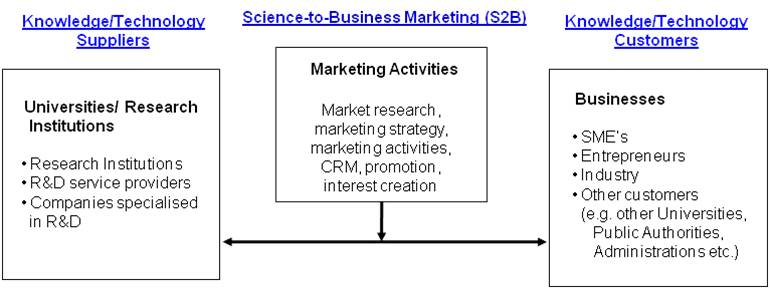
Following Sabisch and Walter

Science-to-business (S2B) marketing aims to streamline the promotion and sale of researchers' work, typically originating from academic institutions and research centers. In this approach, scientists actively engage in transferring technology and knowledge. S2B endeavors to disseminate scientific innovation and expertise while also safeguarding intellectual property, employing both traditional marketing methods such as trade shows and direct responses, as well as online and content marketing strategies like those found on websites and scientific company blogs. Science-to-business (S2B) marketing, also referred to as science marketing, promotes commercial growth and innovation by leveraging scientific research and technical advancements. It involves applying scientific knowledge and research findings to develop commercial products and services that meet consumer needs. Science marketing focuses on simplifying complex scientific concepts into practical and financially viable solutions, enabling seamless integration of scientific understanding and business objectives. By bridging the gap between academia and industry, science marketing facilitates the commercialization of scientific ideas, enabling firms to remain competitive and utilize cutting-edge research for the development of new products and services. Below is a guide for applying the scientific method to marketing experiments, comprising five key steps: 1. Formulate your research question: Clearly define what you want to learn or test through your marketing experiment, ensuring it is specific and measurable. 2. Develop your hypothesis: Based on your research question, create a prediction or educated guess about the outcome of your experiment. 3. Design your experiment: Determine how you will gather data to test your hypothesis, which may involve creating different versions of marketing campaigns or trying various tactics. Ensure to include a control group for comparison. 4. Collect and analyze data: Utilize your designed methods to collect data on the effectiveness of your marketing efforts. Analyze the data to determine if it supports or refutes your hypothesis. 5. Draw conclusions and apply findings: Based on your analysis, assess whether your hypothesis was supported. If so, utilize the results to inform future marketing strategies. If not, revise your hypothesis and repeat the experiment.

== Challenges in the Science-to-Business Interaction ==
Extracting value in the form of research-based technologies and innovations from the university and research organisations is a challenge faced by technology transfer offices, regional development agencies and Governments, and, of course, by Universities and business organisations the world over. Despite the illustrated prominence of technology commercialisation and university-industry links, little research and few suitable approaches exist. In fact, the challenge is not a lack of technology offers or entrepreneurs / capitalists / companies (from here referred to as the 'partners of technology transfer') with needs to receive the technology, but it is the transfer and partnering process itself that requires most attention.

Differing priorities between research institutions and industry and/or entrepreneurs have been cited as a reason for this. For instance, research institutions are, contrary to result- / market-oriented businesses, more process-oriented and primary focused on new knowledge. These different types of research objectives, coupled with differences in organisational cultures relate to different behaviour exhibited by researchers and business people. This, in turn, has a significant impact on the creation of partnerships and a successful transfer of technologies. These issues have proven to be very complex, with a deep-rooted misunderstanding between the two not being sufficiently and adequately addressed. Therefore, a strategic marketing approach is needed in order to assess and extract entrepreneurial value from University research most effectively.

However, a large number of these linkages fail, and a recent study on information and communication technology industries showed organisations to perceive research institutes and cooperative research centres as the least important source of information, knowledge and skills. Despite their importance and frequent failures, however, research on university–industry relationships (UIR) and the factors influencing their fate, especially from a marketing perspective, remains sparse. However, there is a growing research understanding in the area of Science-to-Business marketing.
