= Marketing experimentation =

Marketing experimentation is a research method which can be defined as "the act of conducting such an investigation or test". It is testing a market that is segmented to discover new opportunities for organisations. By controlling conditions in an experiment, organisations will record and make decisions based on consumer behaviour. Marketing experimentation is commonly used to find the best method for maximizing revenues through the acquisition of new customers. For example; two groups of customers are exposed to different advertising (test). How did consumers react to advertising compared to the other group? (measurable). Did the advertising increase sales for each group? (result).

== Characteristics ==
There are three characteristics which are the make-up of a market experimentation:

- Experimental subjects - Humans are usually participants in experiments. Subjects are divided into two or more groups and can be referred to as focus groups. Subjects can be made up of a particular age group (demographical), from a particular area (geographical), or culture (ethnographic).
- Conditions - Known as the independent variable where, conditions are tightly controlled and manipulated by the tester. In a marketing experiment, you may adjust a value within the 4 P's of marketing, or marketing mix. These consist of product, price, place, and promotion. For example, you may run an experiment in which you compare two prices for the same product, to see whether one price-point results in higher overall revenues compared to the other.
- Effects - Are the results of the test known as the dependent variable. Results are measured and cannot be changed. If the tester wants to see different results they would have to change the conditions of the independent variable to measure the effects.

To gain an accurate result from experiments, the experimenter must consider outside factors that could affect the dependent variable. Continuing from the advertising example above; did sales increase because of a festive seasons at that particular time.

== Applied application ==
In marketing email marketing is popular it is more targeted and there are many testable features such as font, colour and pictures. By tailoring emails it gives the experimenter control over conditions. For example; promoting discounts to experimental subjects via email.

It is here the experimenter has control and sets conditions by sending one tailored email to one age group (subject A). The experimenter will send another tailored email to an older age group (subject B) offering the same promotion with a different presentation. The experiment so far is exposing group A and B to different advertising messages.

There are many measurable outcomes, a few are as follows:

- How much time is spent on the site from the URL link in an email
- Better measurement in purchase process than other mediums - Subject A and B using promotion codes from the email
- Users unsubscribing

Comparing the effects the experiment had on subject A and subject B will give the organisation more of an understanding of how these subjects have reacted when they received the email (if there was one) and their purchasing behaviour. The experimenter may wish to change the conditions of the test to measure the different outcomes.

== A/B Testing and Multivariate Testing ==
Two ways to perform a marketing experiment are A/B testing (also known as split testing), and multivariate testing. In an A/B test, you compare two versions of marketing collateral against each other and determine which one performs better. For example, you might compare the open rates for two email subject lines. Usually, the test will be performed on a subset of an entire population, and the results are then used to make a decision on how to market to the rest of the population. In the email example, you might test two subject lines on 20% of a contact database. If one subject line results in significantly more people opening the email than the other, then that subject line is the winner of the test. The next logical step is to use that subject line to send the remaining email messages to the rest of the contacts in a database.

In a multivariate test, you would run an experiment that produces differences in more than one variable on the desired outcome. For example, you might run a multivariate test on a website landing page, in order to determine which version produces the highest percentage of people landing on the page who complete an email registration form. Some of the variables that you include could be two (2) versions of headlines, three (3) versions of page content, and four (4) versions of the call-to-action that compels users to complete the form. In this case, the total number of combinations would be 2x3x4 = 24 total combinations of headlines, content, and calls-to-action. The winner of the test is the best combination of all of the variables. Because of the nature of a multivariate test, it requires much more data than a simpler A/B test for statistical significance.

== Digital marketing ==
Search Engine Optimization (SEO) is the active practice of improving aspects of a website so that commercial search engines (such as Google, Bing, and Yahoo) can find and display web pages in the results when they’re relevant to a searcher’s query as stated by Digital.gov part of the U.S. General Services Administration. Marketing related decisions are no longer guided just by hypothesis and past experience. Influential marketing ideas are now determined by analytics and big data. By utilizing past data and predictive analytics, businesses can now generate better return on investment and provide insights that can lead to effective business strategies and decisions within an organization as stated by Forbes. Organic search results are a large component of a business’ performance on its site. It is also used to more effectively create a buyer funnel and achieve a greater percentage of conversions and engagement.

== Marketing farms ==
In online marketing, link farms are used to increase traffic by linking several web pages to another page, in order to drive up oncoming traffic from these other pages. They are easy to spot because they don’t have any information that is useful. They are generally a bunch of random links on a page that will take you to different places on the web. Because search engines are interested in helping people find what they are looking for on the web, it is easy to see why they look down on link farms. If a search engine has too many link farms in its index, people will become annoyed when trying to find useful information, and they will eventually begin looking for other search engines to use.

== See also ==
- Advertising
- Consumer behaviour
