= Response-rate ratio =

Measure of efficacy in clinical trials

Response-rate ratio is a measure of efficacy of therapy in clinical trials. It is defined as the proportion of improved patients in the treatment group, divided by the proportion of improved patients in the control group. The same term has been used in marketing.
