= Canton of Saint-Antonin-Noble-Val =

Coordinates: 44°10′53″N 1°51′23″E

Saint-Antonin-Noble-Val
- Former canton
- Interactive map of Saint-Antonin-Noble-Val
- Country: France
- Region: Occitania
- Department: Tarn-et-Garonne
- No. of communes: {{{nbcomm}}}
- Disbanded: 2015
- Population (2012): 4,981

The canton of Saint-Antonin-Noble-Val is a former canton in the department of Tarn-et-Garonne in south-central France. It had 4,981 inhabitants (2012). It was disbanded following the French canton reorganisation which came into effect in March 2015. It consisted of 9 communes, which joined the canton of Quercy-Rouergue in 2015.

The canton comprised the following communes:

- Saint-Antonin-Noble-Val
- Castanet
- Cazals
- Féneyrols
- Ginals
- Laguépie
- Parisot
- Varen
- Verfeil

== See also ==
- Cantons of the Tarn-et-Garonne department
