= Arrondissement of Montauban =

Coordinates: 44.02°N 1.35°E

Montauban
- Arrondissement
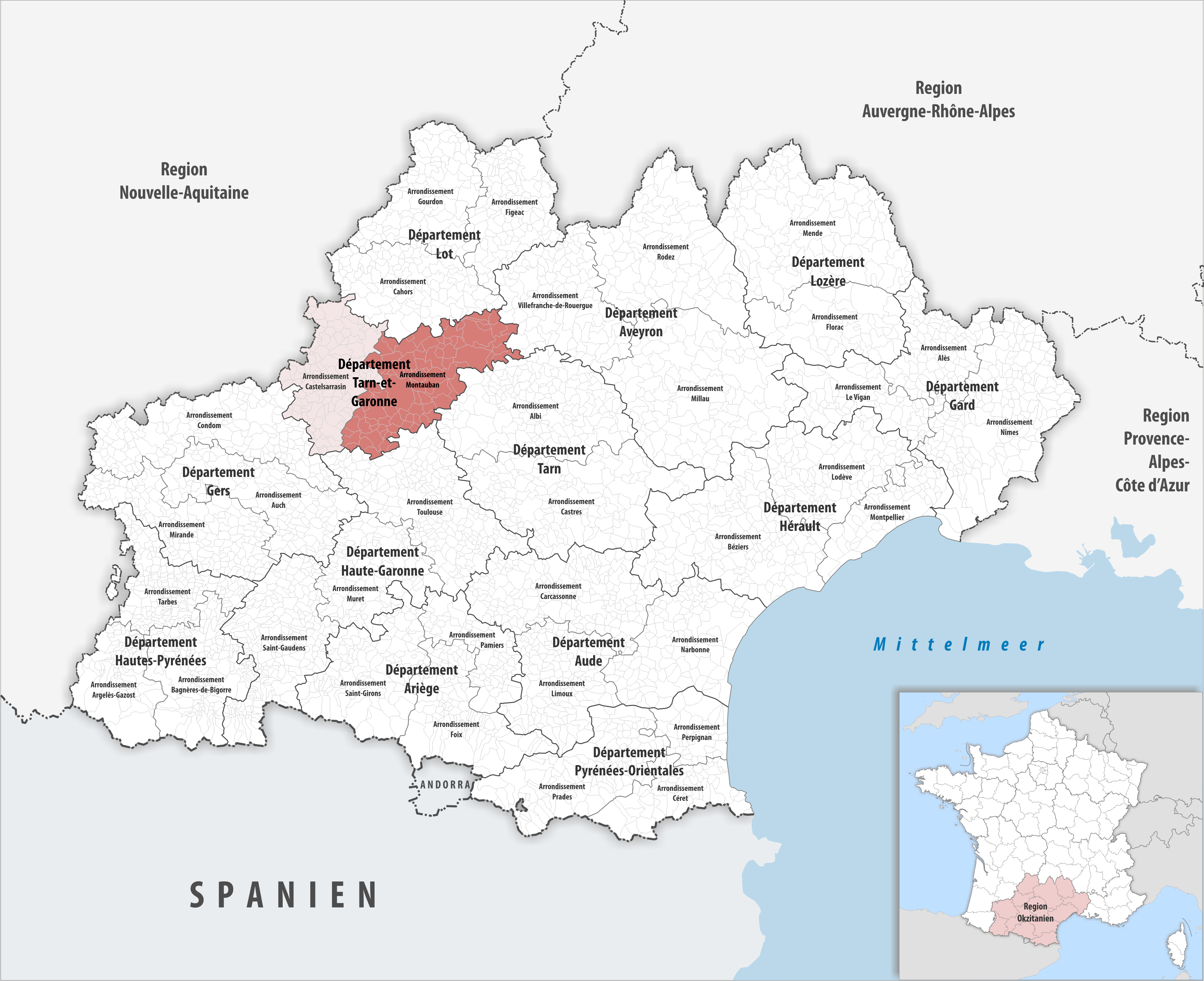
- Location within the region Occitanie
- Country: France
- Region: Occitania
- Department: Tarn-et-Garonne
- No. of communes: 92
- Area: 2,116.8 km^{2} (817.3 sq mi)
- Population (2023): 186,869
  - Density: 88.279/km^{2} (228.64/sq mi)
- INSEE code: 822

The arrondissement of Montauban is an arrondissement of France in the Tarn-et-Garonne department in the Occitanie region. It has 92 communes. Its population is 184,398 (2021), and its area is 2,116.8 km^{2} (817.3 sq mi).

== Composition ==
The communes of the arrondissement of Montauban, and their INSEE codes, are:

1. Albias (82002)
2. Aucamville (82005)
3. Auty (82007)
4. Beaupuy (82014)
5. Bessens (82017)
6. Bioule (82018)
7. Bouillac (82020)
8. Bourret (82023)
9. Bressols (82025)
10. Bruniquel (82026)
11. Campsas (82027)
12. Canals (82028)
13. Castanet (82029)
14. Caussade (82037)
15. Caylus (82038)
16. Cayrac (82039)
17. Cayriech (82040)
18. Cazals (82041)
19. Comberouger (82043)
20. Corbarieu (82044)
21. Dieupentale (82048)
22. Escatalens (82052)
23. Espinas (82056)
24. Fabas (82057)
25. Féneyrols (82061)
26. Finhan (82062)
27. Génébrières (82066)
28. Ginals (82069)
29. Grisolles (82075)
30. La Salvetat-Belmontet (82176)
31. La Ville-Dieu-du-Temple (82096)
32. Labarthe (82077)
33. Labastide-de-Penne (82078)
34. Labastide-Saint-Pierre (82079)
35. Lacapelle-Livron (82082)
36. Lacourt-Saint-Pierre (82085)
37. Lafrançaise (82087)
38. Laguépie (82088)
39. Lamothe-Capdeville (82090)
40. Lapenche (82092)
41. Lavaurette (82095)
42. Léojac (82098)
43. L'Honor-de-Cos (82076)
44. Loze (82100)
45. Mas-Grenier (82105)
46. Mirabel (82110)
47. Molières (82113)
48. Monbéqui (82114)
49. Monclar-de-Quercy (82115)
50. Montalzat (82119)
51. Montastruc (82120)
52. Montauban (82121)
53. Montbartier (82123)
54. Montbeton (82124)
55. Montech (82125)
56. Monteils (82126)
57. Montfermier (82128)
58. Montpezat-de-Quercy (82131)
59. Montricoux (82132)
60. Mouillac (82133)
61. Nègrepelisse (82134)
62. Nohic (82135)
63. Orgueil (82136)
64. Parisot (82137)
65. Piquecos (82140)
66. Pompignan (82142)
67. Puycornet (82144)
68. Puygaillard-de-Quercy (82145)
69. Puylagarde (82147)
70. Puylaroque (82148)
71. Réalville (82149)
72. Reyniès (82150)
73. Saint-Antonin-Noble-Val (82155)
74. Saint-Cirq (82159)
75. Saint-Étienne-de-Tulmont (82161)
76. Saint-Georges (82162)
77. Saint-Nauphary (82167)
78. Saint-Porquier (82171)
79. Saint-Projet (82172)
80. Saint-Sardos (82173)
81. Saint-Vincent-d'Autéjac (82174)
82. Savenès (82178)
83. Septfonds (82179)
84. Vaïssac (82184)
85. Varen (82187)
86. Varennes (82188)
87. Vazerac (82189)
88. Verdun-sur-Garonne (82190)
89. Verfeil (82191)
90. Verlhac-Tescou (82192)
91. Villebrumier (82194)
92. Villemade (82195)

== History ==
The arrondissement of Montauban was created in 1800 as part of the department Lot. It became part of the new department Tarn-et-Garonne in 1808.

As a result of the reorganisation of the cantons of France which came into effect in 2015, the borders of the cantons are no longer related to the borders of the arrondissements. The cantons of the arrondissement of Montauban were, as of January 2015:

1. Caussade
2. Caylus
3. Grisolles
4. Lafrançaise
5. Molières
6. Monclar-de-Quercy
7. Montauban-1
8. Montauban-2
9. Montauban-3
10. Montauban-4
11. Montauban-5
12. Montauban-6
13. Montech
14. Montpezat-de-Quercy
15. Nègrepelisse
16. Saint-Antonin-Noble-Val
17. Verdun-sur-Garonne
18. Villebrumier
