= Jean Bonhomme (politician) =

French politician (1924–2020)

Member of the French National Assembly for Tarn-et-Garonne
- In office 11 July 1968 – 22 May 1981
- Preceded by: Louis-Jean Delmas
- Succeeded by: Hubert Gouze

Member of the French National Assembly for Tarn-et-Garonne
- In office 2 April 1986 – 14 May 1988

Mayor of Caussade
- In office 24 March 1959 – 24 March 1989
- Preceded by: Aimé Bonnaïs
- Succeeded by: Yvon Collin

General Councillor of the Canton of Caussade
- In office 1961–1992

Personal details
- Born: 8 June 1924 Puylaroque, France
- Died: 16 October 2020 (aged 96) Caussade, France
- Party: UNR; UDR; RPR
- Children: François Bonhomme

Jean Bonhomme (IPA: [ʒɑ̃ bɔnɔm]; 8 June 1924 – 16 October 2020) was a French politician.

Bonhomme served as a member of the French National Assembly from 1968 to 1981 and again from 1986 to 1988.

He was the father of François Bonhomme, Mayor of Caussade since 2008 and Senator from Tarn-et-Garonne since 2014.
