= La Bastide =

La Bastide or Labastide (a fortified town) is the name or part of the name of many communes in France:

- La Bastide, former commune of the Aveyron department, now part of Mur-de-Barrez
- La Bastide, former commune of the Dordogne department, now part of Monestier, Dordogne
- La Bastide, Pyrénées-Orientales, in the Pyrénées-Orientales
- La Bastide, Var, in the Var
- La Bastide-Capdenac, former commune of the Aveyron department, now part of La Rouquette
- La Bastide-Clairence, in the Pyrénées-Atlantiques
- La Bastide-de-Besplas, in the Ariège
- La Bastide-de-Bousignac, in the Ariège
- La Bastide-de-Lordat, in the Ariège
- La Bastide-d'Engras, in the Gard
- La Bastide-de-Sérou, in the Ariège
- La Bastide-des-Fonts, former commune of the Aveyron department, now part of Cornus, Aveyron
- La Bastide-des-Jourdans, in the Vaucluse department
- La Bastide-du-Salat, in the Ariège department
- La Bastide-l'Évêque, in the Aveyron department
- La Bastide-Louquié, former commune of the Aveyron department, now part of Cantoin
- La Bastide-Nantel, former commune of the Tarn-et-Garonne department, now part of Castanet, Tarn-et-Garonne
- La Bastide-Paréage, former commune of the Aveyron department, now part of Saint-Just-sur-Viaur
- La Bastide-Pradines, in the Aveyron department
- La Bastide-Puylaurent, in the Lozère department
- La Bastide-Solages, in the Aveyron department
- La Bastide-sur-l'Hers, in the Ariège department
- La Bastide-Teulat, former name of the commune of La Bastide-Solages (Aveyron)

== Labastide ==
- Labastide, in the Hautes-Pyrénées department
- Labastide-Beauvoir, in the Haute-Garonne department
- Labastide-Castel-Amouroux, in the Lot-et-Garonne department
- Labastide-Cézéracq, in the Pyrénées-Atlantiques department
- Labastide-Chalosse, in the Landes department
- Labastide-Clermont, in the Haute-Garonne department
- Labastide-d'Anjou, in the Aude department
- Labastide-d'Armagnac, in the Landes department
- Labastide-de-Lévis, in the Tarn department
- Labastide-Dénat, in the Tarn department
- Labastide-de-Penne, in the Tarn-et-Garonne department
- Labastide-de-Virac, in the Ardèche department
- Labastide-du-Haut-Mont, in the Lot department
- Labastide-du-Temple, in the Tarn-et-Garonne department
- Labastide-du-Vert, in the Lot department
- Labastide-en-Val, in the Aude department
- Labastide-Esparbairenque, in the Aude department
- Labastide-Gabausse, in the Tarn department
- Labastide-Marnhac, in the Lot department
- Labastide-Monréjeau, in the Pyrénées-Atlantiques department
- Labastide-Murat, in the Lot department
- Labastide-Paumès, in the Haute-Garonne department
- Labastide-Rouairoux, in the Tarn department
- Labastide-Saint-Georges, in the Tarn department
- Labastide-Saint-Pierre, in the Tarn-et-Garonne department
- Labastide-Saint-Sernin, in the Haute-Garonne department
- Labastide-Savès, in the Gers department
- Labastide-sur-Bésorgues, in the Ardèche department
- Labastide-Villefranche, in the Pyrénées-Atlantiques department

== See also ==
- Bastide (disambiguation)
