= François Bonhomme =

French politician (born 1969)

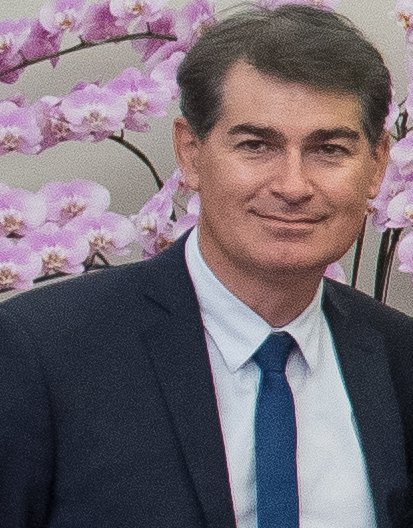
- Bonhomme in 2017

Member of the Senate
- Incumbent
- Assumed office 1 October 2014
- Constituency: Tarn-et-Garonne

Personal details
- Born: 5 May 1969 (age 56)
- Party: The Republicans (since 2015)
- Parent: Jean Bonhomme (father)

François Bonhomme (born 5 May 1969) is a French politician serving as a member of the Senate since 2014. From 2008 to 2016, he served as mayor of Caussade. He is the son of Jean Bonhomme.
