= Bastide (disambiguation) =

A bastide is a fortified new town built in medieval Languedoc, Gascony and Aquitaine in Southwest France during the Middle Ages.

Bastide may also refer to:

- Bastide (Provençal manor), a large farmhouse or manor in Provence, France
- Bastide (restaurant), a defunct Michelin-starred restaurant in West Hollywood, California
- Bastide (surname), a surname

== See also ==
- La Bastide (disambiguation), many places in France
