= Beaulieu-en-Rouergue Abbey =

Abbey in Tarn-et-Garonne, France

Beaulieu-en-Rouergue
- Interactive map of Beaulieu-en-Rouergue

Monastery information
- Full name: Beaulieu-en-Rouergue Abbey (Abbaye de Beaulieu-en-Rouergue)
- Other names: Belloc Abbey (Abbaye de Belloc)
- Order: Cistercian
- Established: 1144
- Disestablished: 1789
- Diocese: Rodez

People
- Founders: Adhemar III, Bishop of Rodez

Site
- Location: Ginals, Tarn-et-Garonne, France
- Coordinates: 44°12′37″N 1°51′14″E
- Website: http://www.beaulieu-en-rouergue.fr/en/

Beaulieu-en-Rouergue Abbey, also known as Belloc Abbey (French: Abbaye de Beaulieu-en-Rouergue, Abbaye de Belloc), is a former Cistercian monastery in south-west France, founded in 1144, which today houses a museum of contemporary art. It is located in the commune of Ginals in the north-east of the Tarn-et-Garonne department, Occitanie.

== History ==
Located in the valley of the River Seye, in the old province of Rouergue, the abbey was founded by the bishop of Rodez, Adhemar III. The buildings were heightened in the 17th centuries, but then fell into decline by the 18th century, when the cloister was demolished. At the time of the French Revolution, the monastery was closed and the buildings sold, to be converted into a farm. Part of the buildings were dismantled. In 1875, the buildings were first classed as a monument historique. The site was purchased in 1960 by M. Brache and Mme. Bonnefoi, who carried out important restoration work, aided by the Caisse des monuments historique et des sites (currently the Centre des monuments nationaux). In 1973, they gave the abbey, together with an important collection of modern art, to the French state. The abbey was then transformed into a centre for contemporary art, and today is a museum of contemporary art in the Midi-Pyrénées area, with minor works by artists including Henri Michaux, Jean Dubuffet, and Maria Helena Vieira da Silva, as well as regional artists.

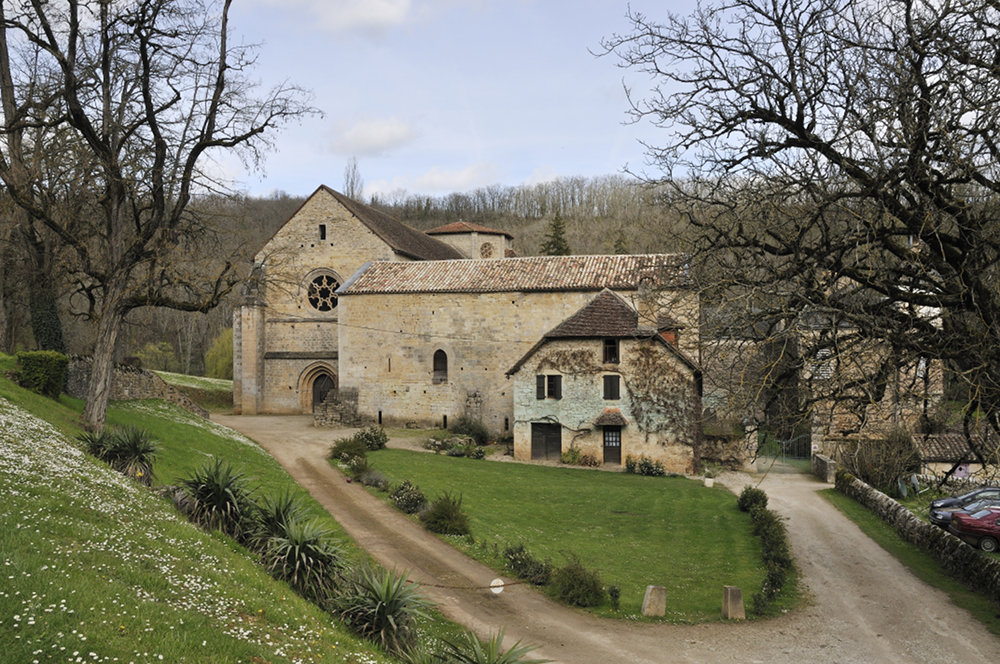
View of monastic buildings
