= Espina =

Espina is a Spanish, Astur-Leonese and Catalan surname. Notable people with the surname include:

- Concha Espina (1869–1955), Spanish writer
- Gerardo Espina, Jr (born 1970), Filipino politician
- Gretchen Espina (born 1988), Filipino singer and actress
- Marcelo Espina (born 1967), Argentine retired footballer
- Darío Espina Pérez (1920–1996), Cuban exile
- Gustavo Adolfo Espina Salguero (1946–2024), 30th President of Guatemala
- Carlos Eduardo Espina (born 1998), Uruguayan-American activist and social media personality

== See also ==
- Lina Espina-Moore (1919–2000), Cebuano writer
- Fernando Martín Espina (1962–1989), Spanish basketball player, brother of Antonio Martín Espina
- Antonio Martín Espina (born 1966), Spanish basketball player, brother of Fernando Martín Espina
- La Espina, a parish in Salas, Asturias, Spain
- Espinas, a commune in southern France
- Espinas (surname)
- Espina (band) Mexican heavy metal / hard rock band
