= Verfeil =

Verfeil is the name of the following communes in France:

- Verfeil, Haute-Garonne, in the Haute-Garonne department
- Verfeil, Tarn-et-Garonne, in the Tarn-et-Garonne department
