= Espinas (surname) =

Espinas is a surname. Notable people with the surname include:

- Alfred Espinas (1844–1922), French philosopher
- Gabby Espinas (born 1982), Filipino basketball player
- Josep Maria Espinàs (1927–2023), Spanish writer

== See also ==
- Espinas, a commune in southern France
- Espina, a surname
