= Canton of Montauban-5 =

Coordinates: 44.0191°N 1.3568°E

The Canton of Montauban-5 was one of the 18 cantons of the arrondissement of Montauban, in the Tarn-et-Garonne department, in southern France. It had 10,536 inhabitants (2012). It was disbanded following the French canton reorganisation which came into effect in March 2015. It comprised part of the commune of Montauban.
