= Labastide-de-Penne =

Labastide-de-Penne La Bastida de Pena (Occitan)
- Commune
- Location of Labastide-de-Penne
- Location within France Location within Occitanie
- Coordinates: 44°17′04″N 1°35′37″E
- Country: France
- Region: Occitania
- Department: Tarn-et-Garonne
- Arrondissement: Montauban
- Canton: Quercy-Rouergue
- Intercommunality: Quercy caussadais

Government
  - Mayor (2020–2026): Jean-Michel Roumiguie
- Area^{1}: 13.68 km^{2} (5.28 sq mi)
- Elevation: 260 m (850 ft)
- Highest elevation: 327 m (1,073 ft)
- Lowest elevation: 167 m (548 ft)
- Population (2023): 125
  - Density: 9.14/km^{2} (23.7/sq mi)
- Time zone: UTC+01:00 (CET)
  - Summer (DST): UTC+02:00 (CEST)
- INSEE/Postal code: 82078 /82240
- ^{1} French Land Register data, which excludes lakes, ponds, glaciers > 1 km^{2} (0.386 sq mi or 247 acres) and river estuaries.

Labastide-de-Penne (French pronunciation: [labastid də pɛn]; Occitan: La Bastida de Pena) is a commune in the Tarn-et-Garonne department in the Occitania region in Southern France. As of 2023, the population of the commune was 125.

Labastide-de-Penne is located on the departmental border with Lot, in which it neighbours the communes of Lalbenque, Belfort-du-Quercy and Belmont-Sainte-Foi. In Tarn-et-Garonne, it neighbours Puylaroque.

== See also ==
- Communes of the Tarn-et-Garonne department
