= Laguépie =

- Commune
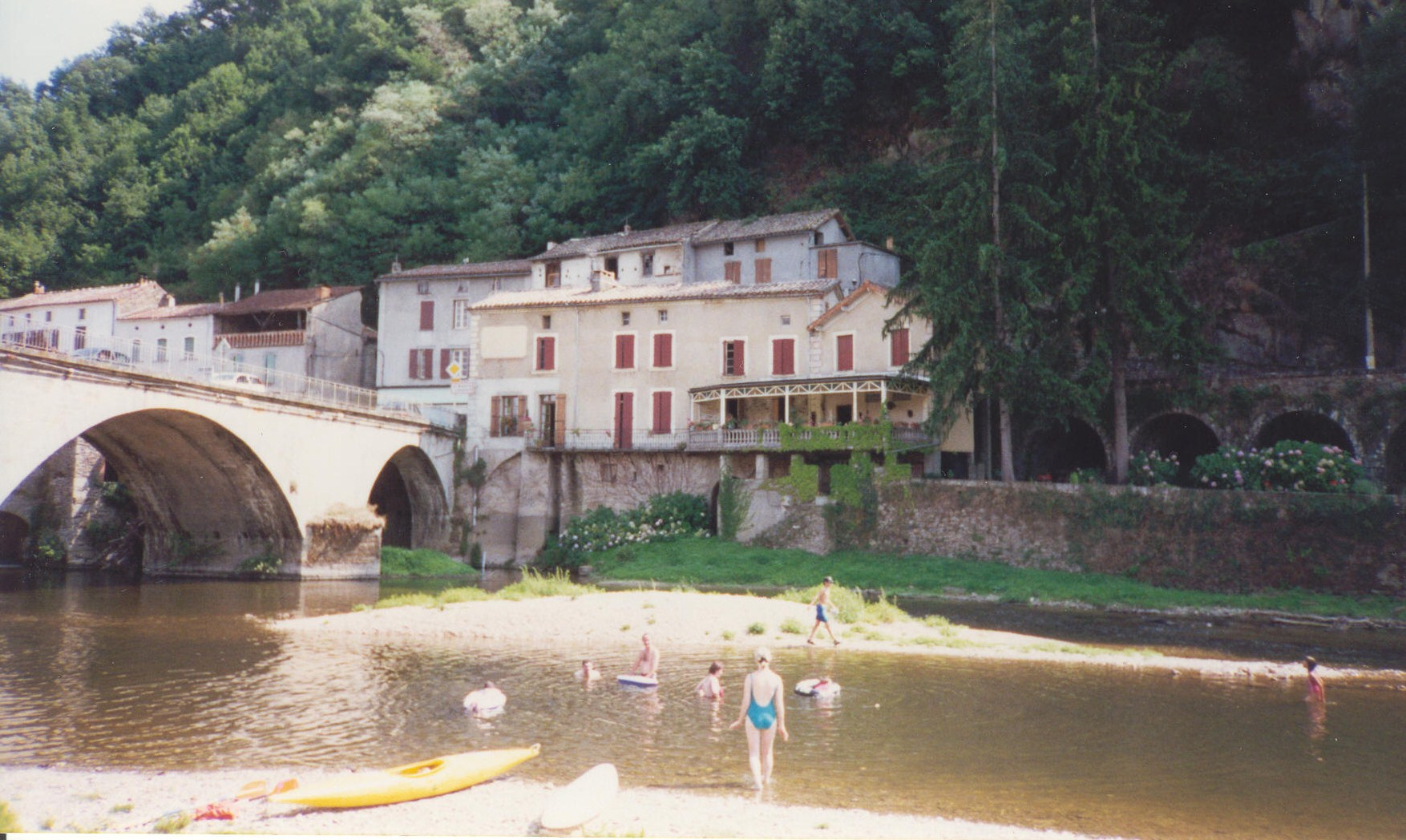
- The River Viaur in Laguépie, in 1995

- Coat of arms
- Location of Laguépie
- Location within France Location within Occitanie
- Coordinates: 44°08′43″N 1°58′14″E
- Country: France
- Region: Occitania
- Department: Tarn-et-Garonne
- Arrondissement: Montauban
- Canton: Quercy-Rouergue
- Intercommunality: Quercy Rouergue et des Gorges de l'Aveyron

Government
  - Mayor (2020–2026): Emmanuel Cros
- Area^{1}: 14.86 km^{2} (5.74 sq mi)
- Elevation: 157 m (515 ft)
- Highest elevation: 387 m (1,270 ft)
- Lowest elevation: 140 m (460 ft)
- Population (2023): 644
  - Density: 43.3/km^{2} (112/sq mi)
- Time zone: UTC+01:00 (CET)
  - Summer (DST): UTC+02:00 (CEST)
- INSEE/Postal code: 82088 /82250
- ^{1} French Land Register data, which excludes lakes, ponds, glaciers > 1 km^{2} (0.386 sq mi or 247 acres) and river estuaries.

Laguépie (French pronunciation: [laɡepi]; Occitan: La Guépia) is a commune in the Tarn-et-Garonne department in the Occitanie region in southern France.

Laguépie is situated at the confluence of the rivers Aveyron and Viaur and at the tri-point of the departments Tarn-et-Garonne, Aveyron and Tarn. On the opposite, left bank of the Viaur is the village Saint-Martin-Laguépie, which is in the Tarn department. Historically part of the province of Rouergue (now the Aveyron department), Laguépie was added to Tarn-et-Garonne in 1808. Laguépie station has rail connections to Toulouse, Figeac and Aurillac.

== See also ==
- Communes of the Tarn-et-Garonne department
