= Cordes–Vindrac station =

Railway station in Occitanie, France

Cordes–Vindrac
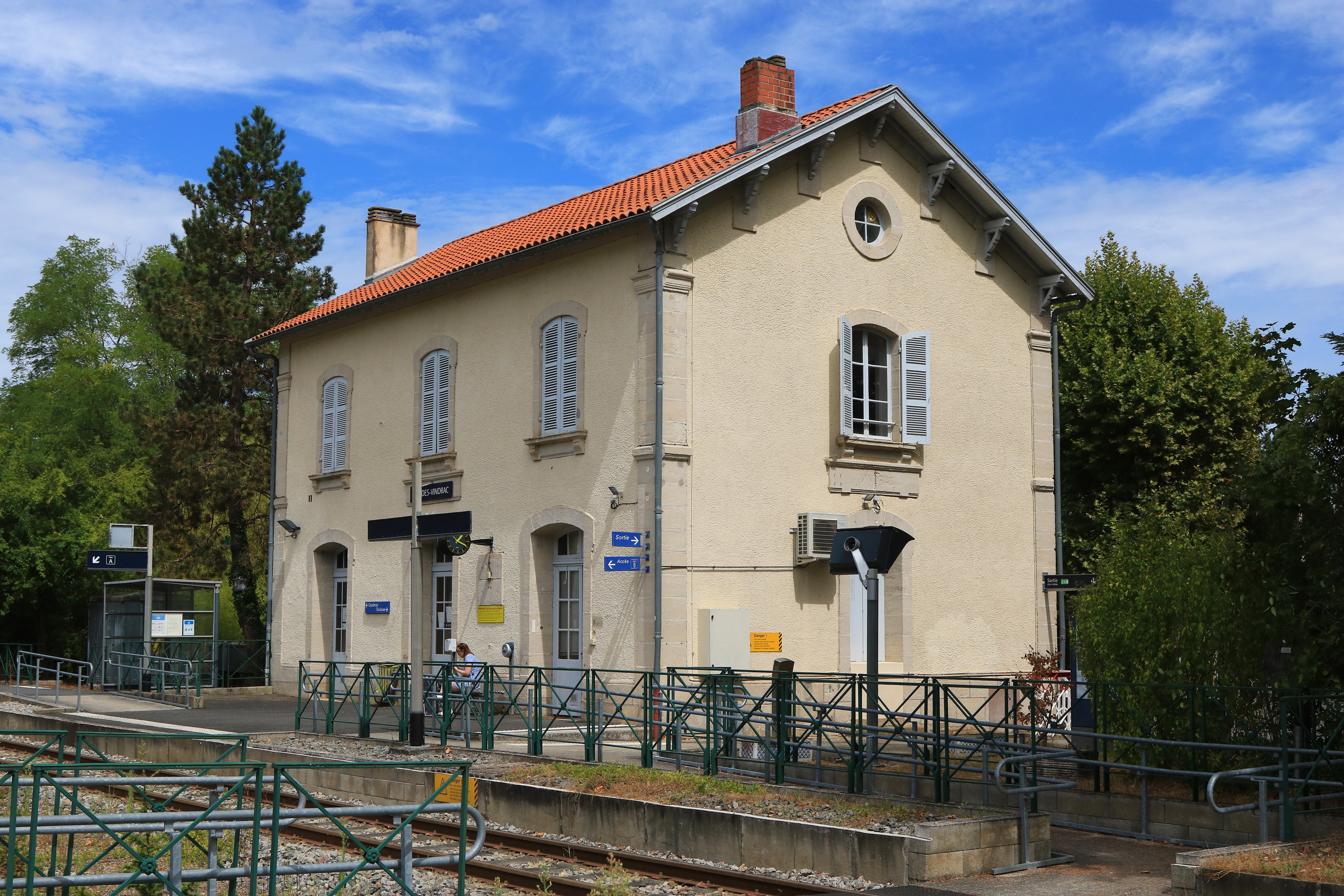

General information
- Coordinates: 44°04′03″N 1°54′00″E
Location

Cordes–Vindrac is a railway station in Vindrac-Alayrac, Occitanie, France. The station is on the Brive-Toulouse (via Capdenac) railway line. The station is served by TER (local) services operated by SNCF.

== Train services ==
The following services call at Cordes-Vindrac:

- Local service (TER Occitanie) Toulouse–Figeac–Aurillac

Preceding station	TER Occitanie	Following station
Gaillac towards Toulouse	3	Lexos towards Aurillac
