= Mouillac, Tarn-et-Garonne =

Mouillac
- Commune
- Location of Mouillac
- Location within France Location within Occitanie
- Coordinates: 44°16′06″N 1°40′03″E
- Country: France
- Region: Occitania
- Department: Tarn-et-Garonne
- Arrondissement: Montauban
- Canton: Quercy-Rouergue
- Intercommunality: CC du Quercy Rouergue et des Gorges de l'Aveyron

Government
  - Mayor (2020–2026): Jean-Claude Romano
- Area^{1}: 9.08 km^{2} (3.51 sq mi)
- Elevation: 268 m (879 ft)
- Highest elevation: 326 m (1,070 ft)
- Lowest elevation: 187 m (614 ft)
- Population (2023): 90
  - Density: 9.9/km^{2} (26/sq mi)
- Time zone: UTC+01:00 (CET)
  - Summer (DST): UTC+02:00 (CEST)
- INSEE/Postal code: 82133 /82160
- ^{1} French Land Register data, which excludes lakes, ponds, glaciers > 1 km^{2} (0.386 sq mi or 247 acres) and river estuaries.

Mouillac (French pronunciation: [mujak]; Occitan: Molhac) is a commune in the Tarn-et-Garonne department in the Occitanie region in southern France.

== See also ==
- Communes of the Tarn-et-Garonne department
