= Lavaurette =

- Commune
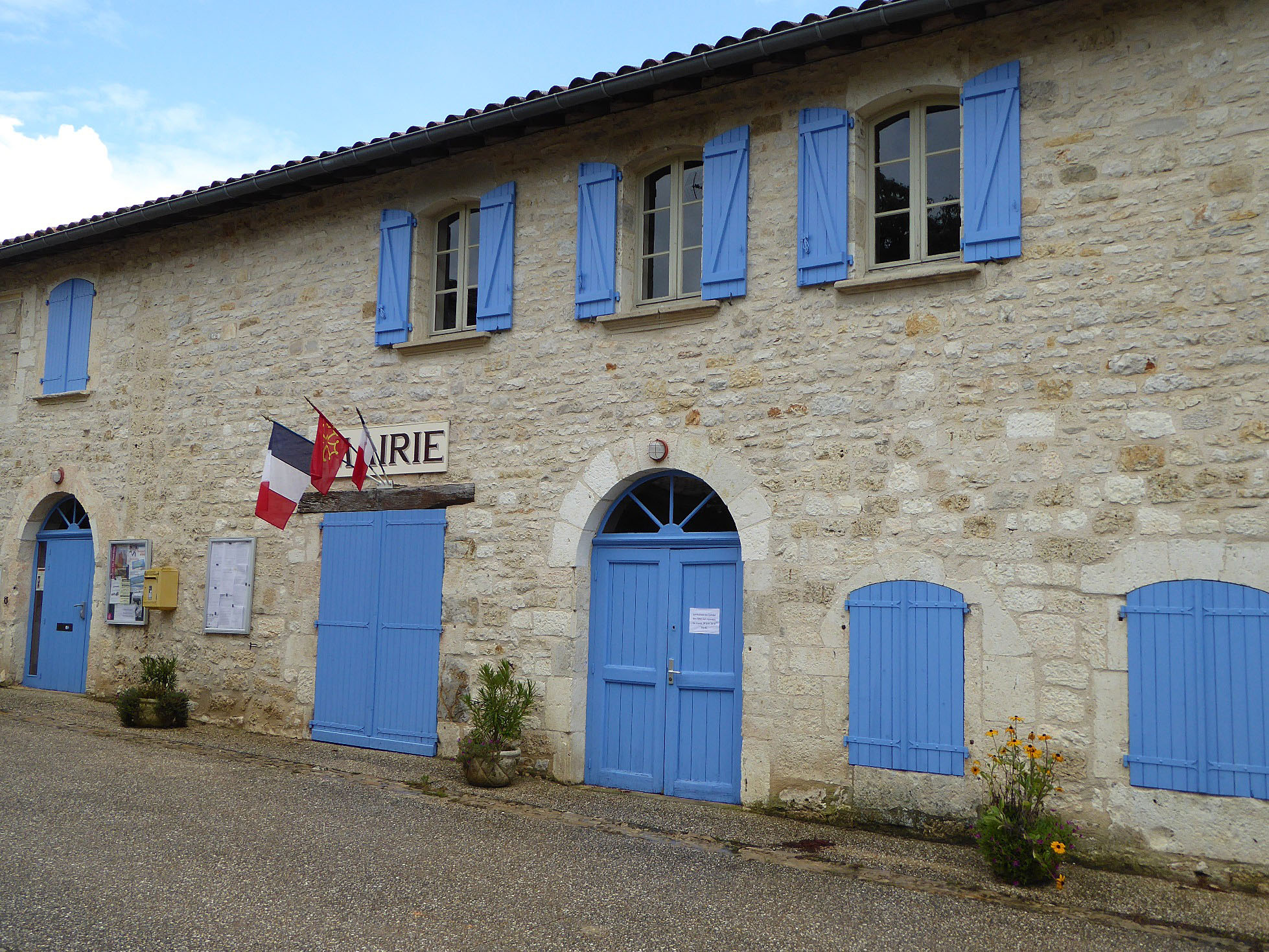
- Town hall
- Location of Lavaurette
- Location within France Location within Occitanie
- Coordinates: 44°12′23″N 1°40′16″E
- Country: France
- Region: Occitania
- Department: Tarn-et-Garonne
- Arrondissement: Montauban
- Canton: Quercy-Rouergue
- Intercommunality: Quercy Caussadais

Government
  - Mayor (2020–2026): Nils Passedat
- Area^{1}: 13.63 km^{2} (5.26 sq mi)
- Elevation: 300 m (980 ft)
- Highest elevation: 315 m (1,033 ft)
- Lowest elevation: 171 m (561 ft)
- Population (2023): 214
  - Density: 15.7/km^{2} (40.7/sq mi)
- Time zone: UTC+01:00 (CET)
  - Summer (DST): UTC+02:00 (CEST)
- INSEE/Postal code: 82095 /82240
- ^{1} French Land Register data, which excludes lakes, ponds, glaciers > 1 km^{2} (0.386 sq mi or 247 acres) and river estuaries.

Lavaurette (French pronunciation: [lavoʁɛt]; Occitan: La Vaureta) is a commune in the Tarn-et-Garonne department in the Occitanie region in southern France.

== See also ==
- Communes of the Tarn-et-Garonne department
