= Saint-Projet, Tarn-et-Garonne =

Saint-Projet
- Commune
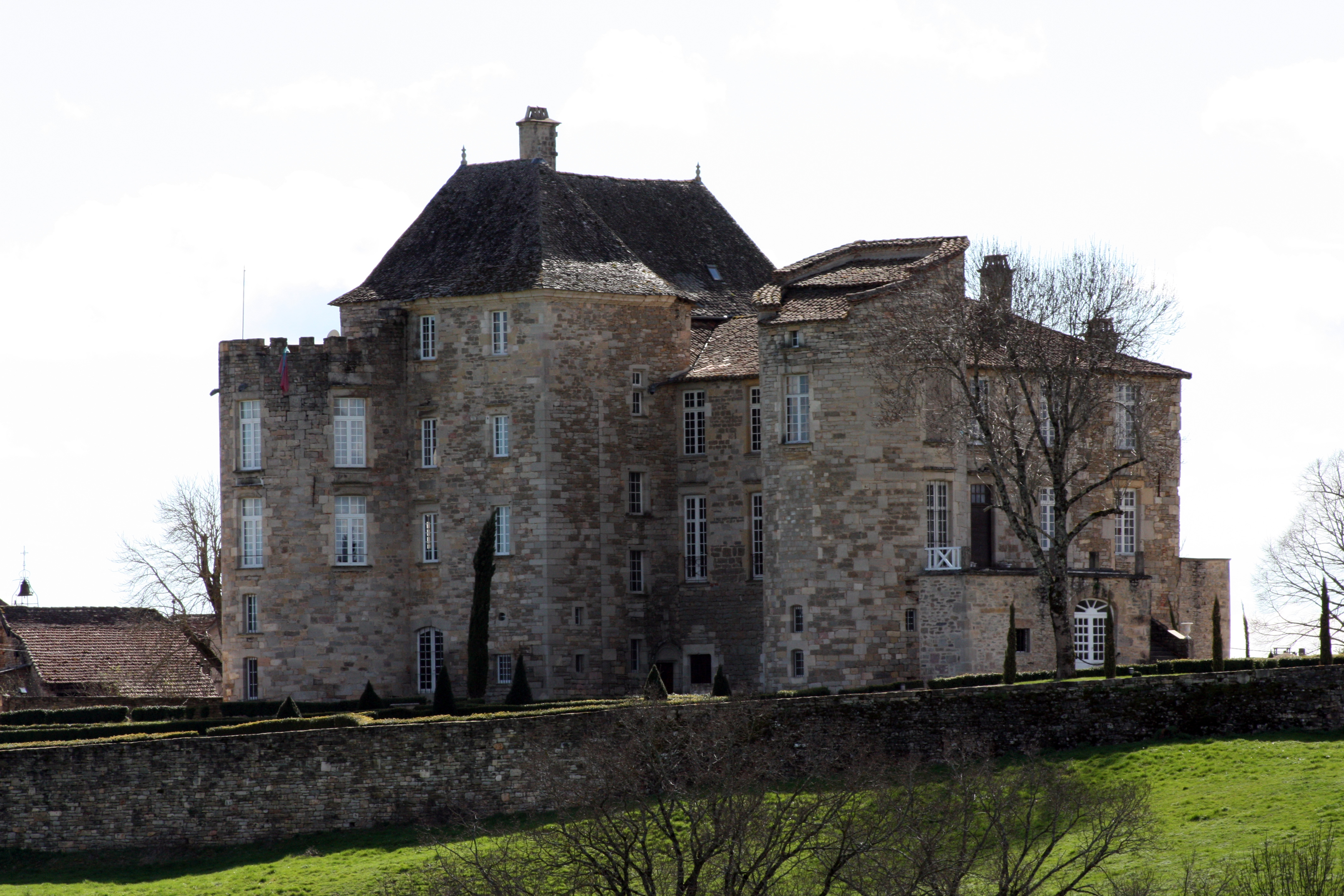
- The Château of Saint-Projet
- Location of Saint-Projet
- Location within France Location within Occitanie
- Coordinates: 44°18′18″N 1°47′38″E
- Country: France
- Region: Occitania
- Department: Tarn-et-Garonne
- Arrondissement: Montauban
- Canton: Quercy-Rouergue
- Intercommunality: Quercy Rouergue et des Gorges de l'Aveyron

Government
  - Mayor (2020–2026): Christian Frauciel
- Area^{1}: 26.14 km^{2} (10.09 sq mi)
- Elevation: 384 m (1,260 ft)
- Highest elevation: 402 m (1,319 ft)
- Lowest elevation: 213 m (699 ft)
- Population (2023): 295
  - Density: 11.3/km^{2} (29.2/sq mi)
- Time zone: UTC+01:00 (CET)
  - Summer (DST): UTC+02:00 (CEST)
- INSEE/Postal code: 82172 /82160
- ^{1} French Land Register data, which excludes lakes, ponds, glaciers > 1 km^{2} (0.386 sq mi or 247 acres) and river estuaries.

Saint-Projet (French pronunciation: [sɛ̃ pʁɔʒɛ]; Occitan: Sent Progèt) is a commune in the Tarn-et-Garonne department in the Occitanie region in southern France.

== History ==
Found in the area are traces of Gallo-Roman culture at a place called Grand-Cartayrou which it is claimed could be a Roman camp.

== See also ==
- Communes of the Tarn-et-Garonne department
