= Vindrac-Alayrac =

- Commune
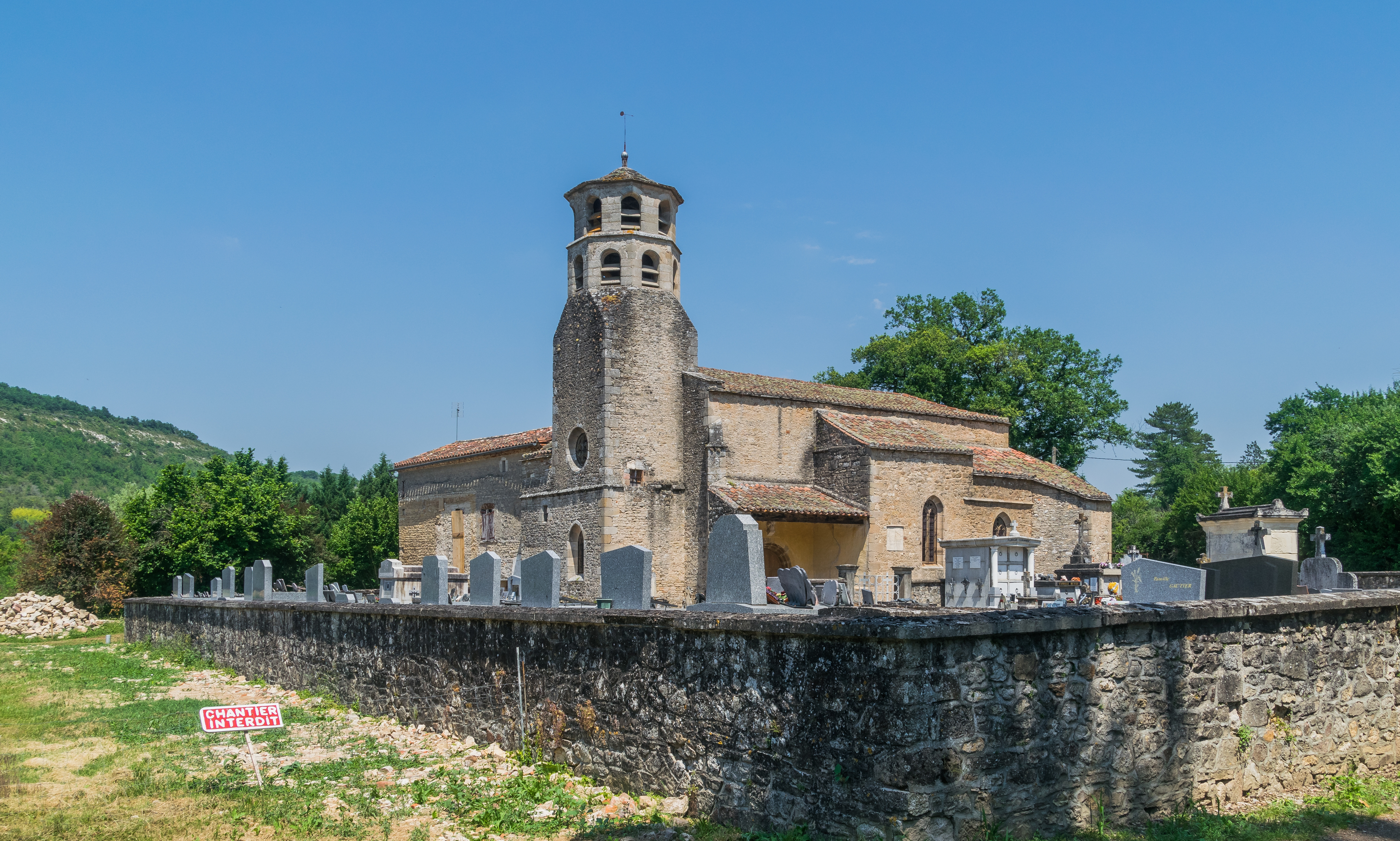
- Saint-Martin Church of Vindrac-Alayrac
- Location of Vindrac-Alayrac
- Location within France Location within Occitanie
- Coordinates: 44°03′58″N 1°54′49″E
- Country: France
- Region: Occitania
- Department: Tarn
- Arrondissement: Albi
- Canton: Carmaux-2 Vallée du Cérou
- Intercommunality: CC du Cordais et du Causse

Government
  - Mayor (2022–2026): Jean-Christian Bohere
- Area^{1}: 9.82 km^{2} (3.79 sq mi)
- Elevation: 160 m (520 ft)
- Highest elevation: 340 m (1,120 ft)
- Lowest elevation: 150 m (490 ft)
- Population (2023): 159
  - Density: 16.2/km^{2} (41.9/sq mi)
- Time zone: UTC+01:00 (CET)
  - Summer (DST): UTC+02:00 (CEST)
- INSEE/Postal code: 81320 /81170
- ^{1} French Land Register data, which excludes lakes, ponds, glaciers > 1 km^{2} (0.386 sq mi or 247 acres) and river estuaries.

Vindrac-Alayrac (French pronunciation: [vɛ̃dʁak alɛʁak]; Occitan: Vindrac e Alairac) is a commune in the Tarn department in southern France.

== Geography ==
The commune is traversed by the Cérou river. Cordes-Vindrac station has rail connections to Toulouse, Figeac and Aurillac.

== See also ==
- Communes of the Tarn department
