= Loze, Tarn-et-Garonne =

Loze
- Commune
- Location of Loze
- Location within France Location within Occitanie
- Coordinates: 44°17′14″N 1°47′39″E
- Country: France
- Region: Occitania
- Department: Tarn-et-Garonne
- Arrondissement: Montauban
- Canton: Quercy-Rouergue
- Intercommunality: Quercy Rouergue et des Gorges de l'Aveyron

Government
  - Mayor (2020–2026): Raymond Boulpicante
- Area^{1}: 11.05 km^{2} (4.27 sq mi)
- Elevation: 390 m (1,280 ft)
- Highest elevation: 383 m (1,257 ft)
- Lowest elevation: 216 m (709 ft)
- Population (2023): 118
  - Density: 10.7/km^{2} (27.7/sq mi)
- Time zone: UTC+01:00 (CET)
  - Summer (DST): UTC+02:00 (CEST)
- INSEE/Postal code: 82100 /82160
- ^{1} French Land Register data, which excludes lakes, ponds, glaciers > 1 km^{2} (0.386 sq mi or 247 acres) and river estuaries.

Loze (French pronunciation: [loz]; Occitan: Lòse) is a commune in the Tarn-et-Garonne department in the Occitanie region in southern France.

== See also ==
- Communes of the Tarn-et-Garonne department
