= Lacapelle-Livron =

- Commune
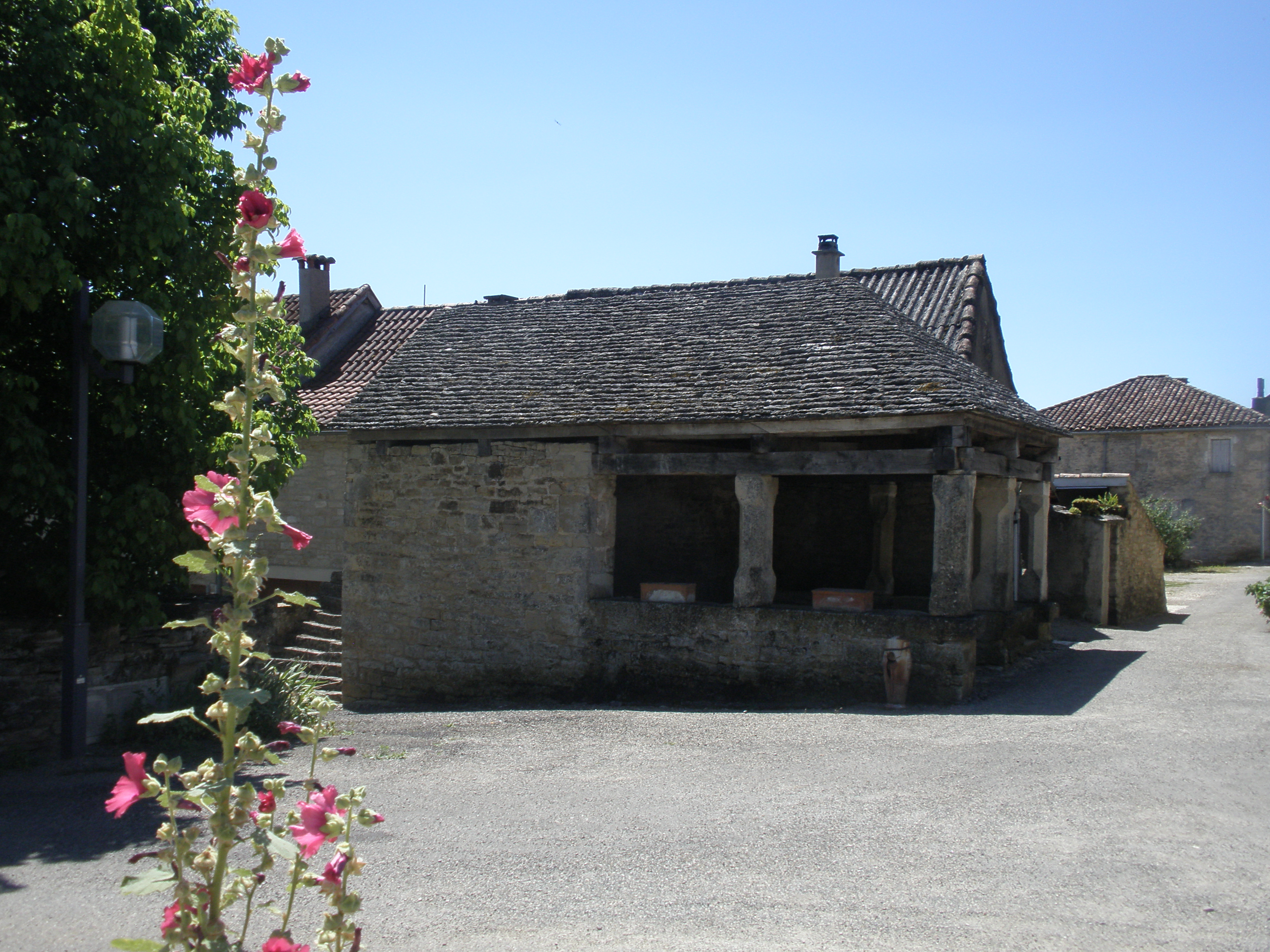
- The covered market of Lacapelle-Livron
- Location of Lacapelle-Livron
- Location within France Location within Occitanie
- Coordinates: 44°16′04″N 1°47′05″E
- Country: France
- Region: Occitania
- Department: Tarn-et-Garonne
- Arrondissement: Montauban
- Canton: Quercy-Rouergue
- Intercommunality: CC du Quercy Rouergue et des Gorges de l'Aveyron

Government
  - Mayor (2020–2026): Didier Marty
- Area^{1}: 13.79 km^{2} (5.32 sq mi)
- Elevation: 315 m (1,033 ft)
- Highest elevation: 389 m (1,276 ft)
- Lowest elevation: 211 m (692 ft)
- Population (2023): 220
  - Density: 16/km^{2} (41/sq mi)
- Time zone: UTC+01:00 (CET)
  - Summer (DST): UTC+02:00 (CEST)
- INSEE/Postal code: 82082 /82160
- ^{1} French Land Register data, which excludes lakes, ponds, glaciers > 1 km^{2} (0.386 sq mi or 247 acres) and river estuaries.

Lacapelle-Livron (French pronunciation: [lakapɛl livʁɔ̃]; Occitan: La Capèla de Libron) is a commune in the Tarn-et-Garonne department in the Occitanie region in southern France.

== See also ==
- Communes of the Tarn-et-Garonne department
