= Monteils, Tarn-et-Garonne =

Monteils
- Commune
- Location of Monteils
- Location within France Location within Occitanie
- Coordinates: 44°10′27″N 1°33′58″E
- Country: France
- Region: Occitania
- Department: Tarn-et-Garonne
- Arrondissement: Montauban
- Canton: Quercy-Rouergue
- Intercommunality: Quercy caussadais

Government
  - Mayor (2020–2026): Christophe Massaloup
- Area^{1}: 12.08 km^{2} (4.66 sq mi)
- Elevation: 143 m (469 ft)
- Highest elevation: 187 m (614 ft)
- Lowest elevation: 110 m (360 ft)
- Population (2023): 1,379
  - Density: 114.2/km^{2} (295.7/sq mi)
- Time zone: UTC+01:00 (CET)
  - Summer (DST): UTC+02:00 (CEST)
- INSEE/Postal code: 82126 /82300
- ^{1} French Land Register data, which excludes lakes, ponds, glaciers > 1 km^{2} (0.386 sq mi or 247 acres) and river estuaries.

Monteils (French pronunciation: [mɔ̃tɛj]; Occitan: Montelhs) is a commune in the Tarn-et-Garonne department in the Occitanie region in southern France.

Its inhabitants are called Monteillais in French.

== Geography ==
The commune is located in the Quercy on the river Lère to the east of Caussade, in an undulating countryside. Farmland, woods, meadows closed by hedges or dry stone walls, form the bulk of its natural identity.

== History ==
According to Boscus, Monteils first appeared in history in 1165. Through a papal bull, Pope Alexander III confirmed that the chapter of Saint-Antonin retained possession of the church of Monteils, known under the name of Saint-Jean Baptiste.

A pair of fibulae dated to the 6th century, discovered at the site known as Las Places, is preserved at the Saint-Raymond Museum in Toulouse.

However, according to Jacques Neveu, significant discoveries (tombs dated to around the 6th century AD, four Gallo-Roman sites—the most important being that of Sès—jewelry, flint tools, bifaces, etc.) suggest that human presence in the region dates back more than 150,000 years.

The church of Monteils was once part of the taxable territory of Caussade. The community of Caussade originally consisted of seven parishes: Notre-Dame del Fraysse, Saint-Sernin-de-Montevols, Saint-Pierre-de-l’Herm (La Bénèche), Saint-Martin-de-Sesquières, Saint-Jean-de-Monteils, Saint-Cirice-du-Colombié, and Saint-Pierre-de-Milhac (according to C. Sahuc).

The territory included in the commune of Monteils was the possession of several lords (the Milhac, Peyrelade, Bazagues, and Jagot families). There was even a family named Monteils around the year 1300. The Château de Monteils was mentioned for the first time in a document from the year 1239 (according to L. Boscus).

In 1622, conflicts arose between the inhabitants of Monteils and Caussade over the appointment of the noble Antoine de Manas as the Catholic syndic. The dispute escalated into physical altercations, leading to deep antagonism between the two parishes until 1729 (according to L. Boscus).

In 1728, Pierre Lacombe, squire and lord of Monteils, the adjudicator of royal justice, sought to obtain royal approval for the separation of the parish of Monteils from the community of Caussade. It was more prestigious for him to be the lord of the community of Monteils rather than just the parish of Monteils. Caussade engaged in a legal battle against the resale of justice (according to C. Sahuc).

On May 24, 1729, a decree from the Council of State in Compiègne officially declared the separation of the two parishes. Legal proceedings continued on both sides (according to C. Sahuc).

Monteils established its cadastral records from 1757 to 1768. The number of property owners increased from around 160 in 1640 to 214 in 1768 (according to C. Sahuc).

Jean Lugan-James was one of the very first landowners among the inhabitants in 1789.

In 1789, the grievance register of Caussade listed as its primary demand the return of Monteils to the community. "This parish benefits from our amenities and local expenditures without contributing anything" (according to C. Sahuc).

In 1791, Monteils had 1,036 inhabitants? (according to J. Neveu).

== See also ==
- Communes of the Tarn-et-Garonne department
