= Lapenche =

- Commune
- Location of Lapenche
- Location within France Location within Occitanie
- Coordinates: 44°13′31″N 1°34′36″E
- Country: France
- Region: Occitania
- Department: Tarn-et-Garonne
- Arrondissement: Montauban
- Canton: Quercy-Rouergue
- Intercommunality: Quercy Caussadais

Government
  - Mayor (2024–2026): Didier Guignard
- Area^{1}: 8.11 km^{2} (3.13 sq mi)
- Elevation: 140 m (460 ft)
- Highest elevation: 192 m (630 ft)
- Lowest elevation: 128 m (420 ft)
- Population (2023): 274
  - Density: 33.8/km^{2} (87.5/sq mi)
- Time zone: UTC+01:00 (CET)
  - Summer (DST): UTC+02:00 (CEST)
- INSEE/Postal code: 82092 /82240
- ^{1} French Land Register data, which excludes lakes, ponds, glaciers > 1 km^{2} (0.386 sq mi or 247 acres) and river estuaries.

Lapenche (French pronunciation: [lapɛ̃ʃ]; Languedocien: La Pencha) is a commune in the Tarn-et-Garonne department in the Occitanie region in southern France.

== See also ==
- Communes of the Tarn-et-Garonne department
