= Septfonds =

- Commune
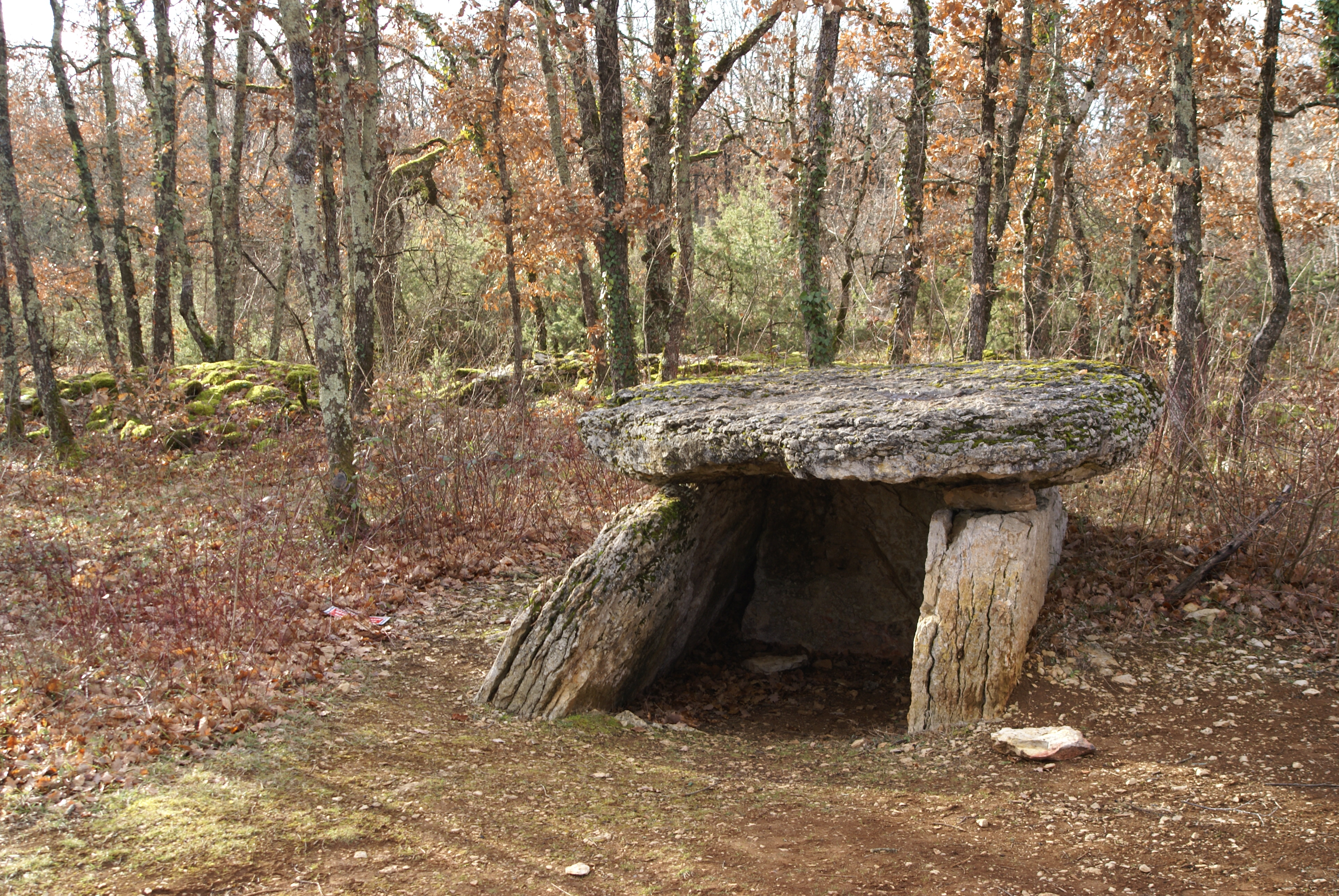
- Dolmen of Finelle, in Septfonds

- Coat of arms
- Location of Septfonds
- Location within France Location within Occitanie
- Coordinates: 44°10′46″N 1°37′09″E
- Country: France
- Region: Occitania
- Department: Tarn-et-Garonne
- Arrondissement: Montauban
- Canton: Quercy-Rouergue
- Intercommunality: Quercy caussadais

Government
  - Mayor (2020–2026): Nadine Sinopoli
- Area^{1}: 27.05 km^{2} (10.44 sq mi)
- Elevation: 174 m (571 ft)
- Highest elevation: 247 m (810 ft)
- Lowest elevation: 128 m (420 ft)
- Population (2023): 2,261
  - Density: 83.59/km^{2} (216.5/sq mi)
- Time zone: UTC+01:00 (CET)
  - Summer (DST): UTC+02:00 (CEST)
- INSEE/Postal code: 82179 /82240
- ^{1} French Land Register data, which excludes lakes, ponds, glaciers > 1 km^{2} (0.386 sq mi or 247 acres) and river estuaries.

Septfonds (French pronunciation: [sɛtfɔ̃]; Occitan: Sètfonts) is a commune in the Tarn-et-Garonne department in the Occitanie region in southern France.

== Population ==
Historical population
Year	Pop.	±% p.a.
1968	1,600	—
1975	1,605	+0.04%
1982	1,579	−0.23%
1990	1,731	+1.16%
1999	1,860	+0.80%
2007	2,065	+1.32%
2012	2,154	+0.85%
2017	2,212	+0.53%
2023	2,261	+0.37%
Source: INSEE

== See also ==
- Communes of the Tarn-et-Garonne department
- Camp of Septfonds
