= Ginals =

- Commune
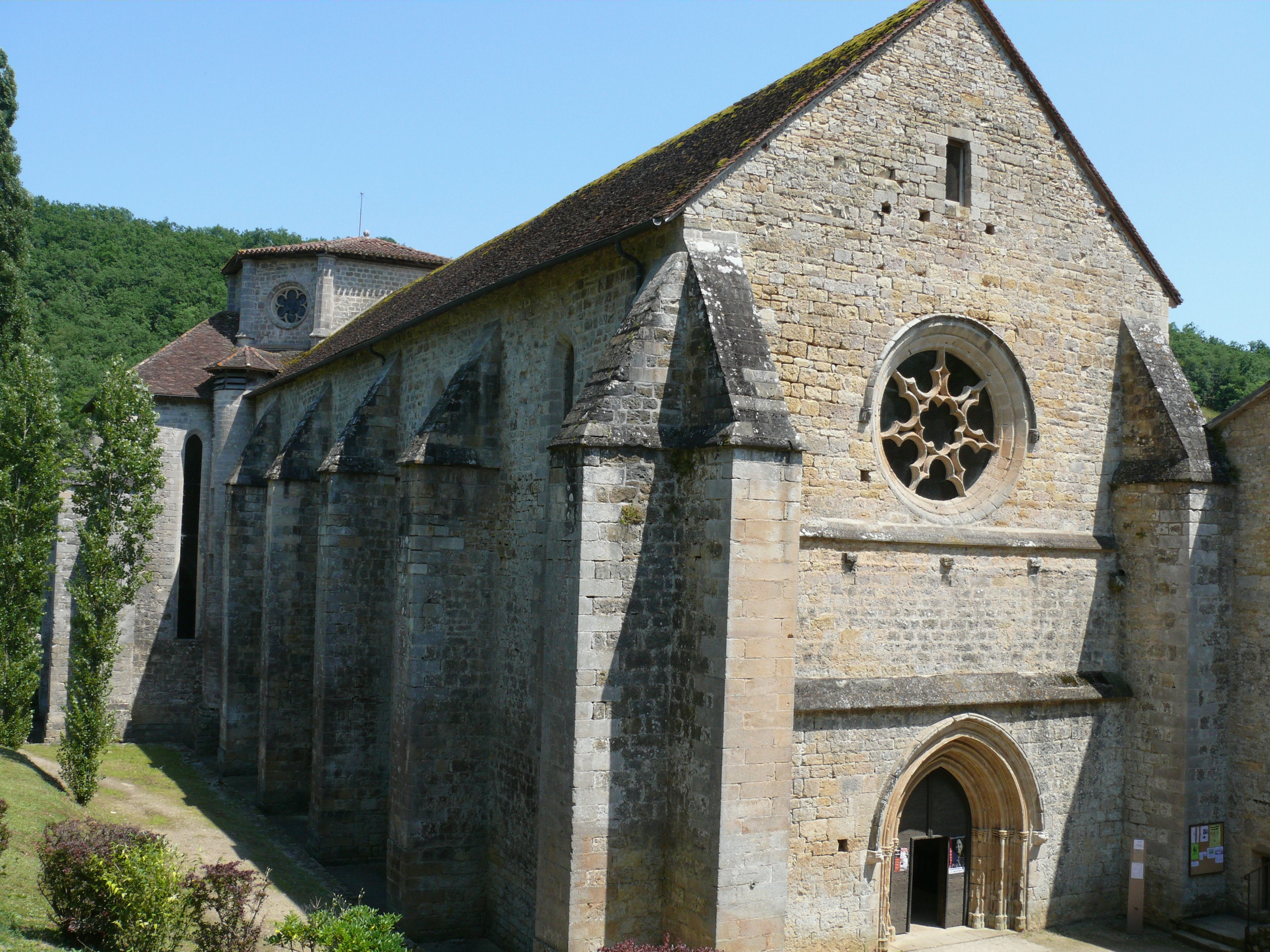
- The Abbey of Beaulieu-en-Rouergue, in Ginals
- Location of Ginals
- Location within France Location within Occitanie
- Coordinates: 44°12′00″N 1°51′50″E
- Country: France
- Region: Occitania
- Department: Tarn-et-Garonne
- Arrondissement: Montauban
- Canton: Quercy-Rouergue

Government
  - Mayor (2020–2026): Cécile Lafon
- Area^{1}: 24.15 km^{2} (9.32 sq mi)
- Elevation: 1,864 m (6,115 ft)
- Highest elevation: 463 m (1,519 ft)
- Lowest elevation: 191 m (627 ft)
- Population (2023): 203
  - Density: 8.41/km^{2} (21.8/sq mi)
- Time zone: UTC+01:00 (CET)
  - Summer (DST): UTC+02:00 (CEST)
- INSEE/Postal code: 82069 /82330
- ^{1} French Land Register data, which excludes lakes, ponds, glaciers > 1 km^{2} (0.386 sq mi or 247 acres) and river estuaries.

Ginals (French pronunciation: [ʒinal]; Occitan: Ginalhs) is a commune in the Tarn-et-Garonne department in the Occitanie region in southern France.

Some of the oldest inhabitants are able to speak in the local patois, an ancient language of the area.

Ginals is almost equidistant from the medieval towns of St. Antonin Noble Val and Caylus. The nearest village with a shop is Verfeil. Ginals has no village centre as such but is a geographical area made up of many hamlets, individual farms and houses which are scattered throughout the rural commune. Two of the largest outlying hamlets are those of St. Ignes and Lardaillé. One typical hamlet (mas) once had a population of over 100 people living in about 20 houses. Today there are only three houses which are occupied as part-time holiday homes by three British families. Over twice as many houses are in ruins or partly restored and many have completely disappeared.

There are churches at St. Ignes and at Ginals, near the mairie. One of the main visitor attractions is the former Cistercian Beaulieu-en-Rouergue Abbey founded in 1144. It is an important centre for contemporary art and holds regular exhibitions. The river through Ginals is the Seye which once had several water mills along its banks.

During early August there is a 'Repas Champetre', a traditional village meal with music and dancing. This is usually held at St. Ignes. Visitors are very welcome but this is a traditional event not specifically arranged for tourists.

The terrain is hilly with views over the surrounding countryside from the hill tops. There are also many broad leaved woods on the hillsides. The soil is alkaline and supports many interesting plants. In the Spring especially, many wild meadows are a blaze of flowers. The fauna includes wild boars, deer, hares, and other small mammals, as well as a number of serpents and insects. Wild fruits and nuts grow in abundance. Quince and medlars are common as are wild plums, chestnuts and walnuts.

There are many walking trails in the area, some of which can be with organised groups if desired. For example, a walk was led by M. Pierre Levadous, of the French Orchid Society, in May 2008, to search for wild orchids. Over 20 species were found. Such walks are often free of charge, some end with a meal.

The resident population of around 200 is greatly swelled by part-time dwellers, of several nationalities, who have holiday homes/second homes in the commune. Traditional holiday makers also add to the numbers, especially in the summer when they occupy many of the holiday rentals.

== See also ==
- Communes of the Tarn-et-Garonne department
