= Lexos station =

Railway station in Varen, France

Lexos
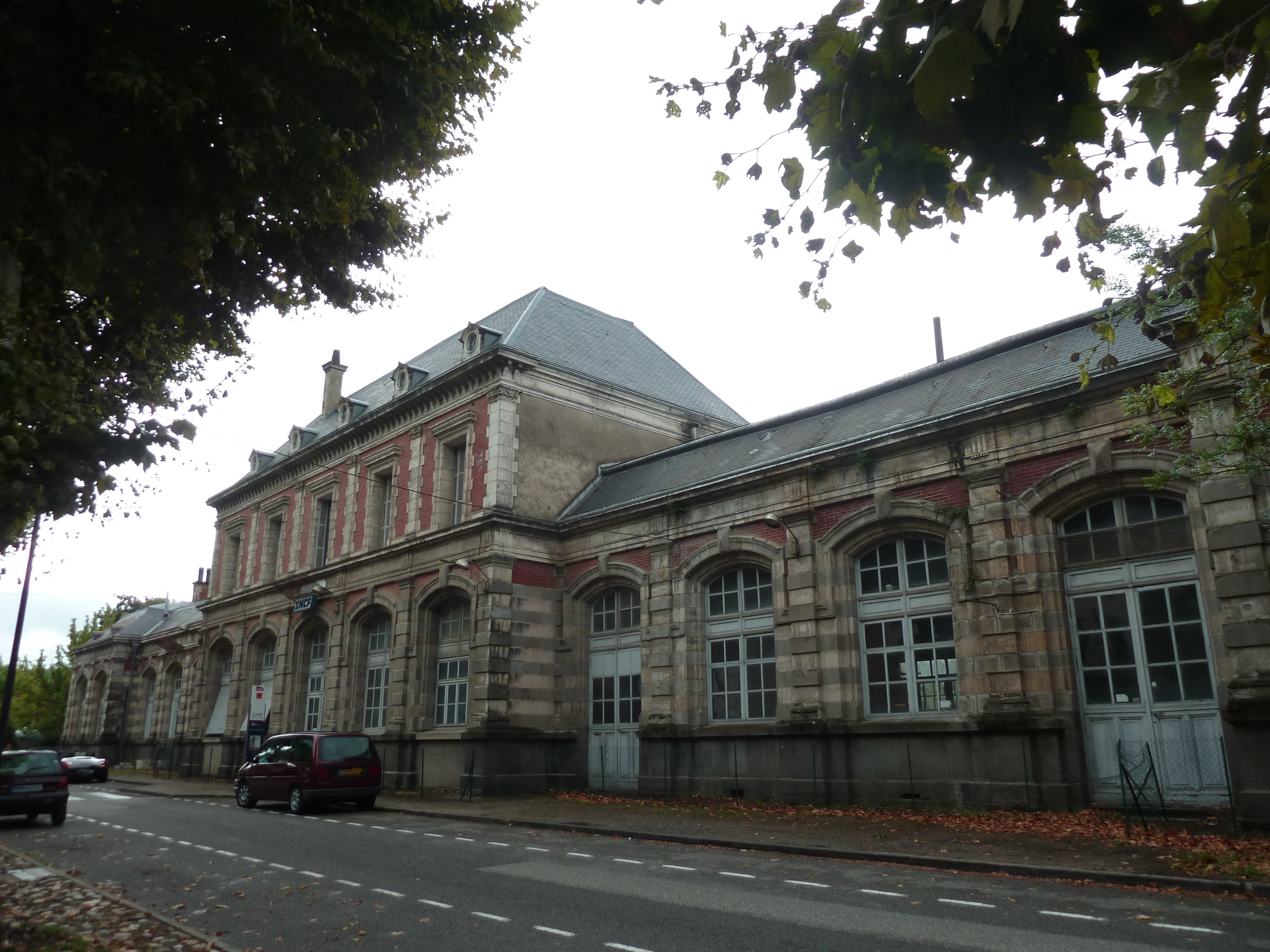
- The listed passenger building at Lexos

General information
- Location: Varen, Tarn-et-Garonne; France
- Coordinates: 44.142248°N 1.885131°E
- Owner: SNCF
- Line: Brive–Toulouse (via Capdenac)
- Platforms: 1
- Tracks: 1 (several disused)
- Train operators: TER Occitanie

Other information
- Station code: 87613489

History
- Opened: 30 August 1858

Services
Preceding station	TER Occitanie	Following station
Cordes-Vindrac towards Toulouse	3	Laguépie towards Aurillac
Location

Lexos is a railway station in Varen, Tarn-et-Garonne, Occitanie, France. It is on the Brive-Toulouse (via Capdenac) line and is served by TER (local) services operated by SNCF. A former Montauban branch line also terminated here.

It was opened in 1858 by the Compagnie du chemin de fer de Paris à Orléans. Its imposing passenger terminal building was classified as a Monument historique in 2007.

== History ==
The station at Lexos was opened on 30 August 1858 by the Compagnie du chemin de fer de Paris à Orléans (CFPO), when it inaugurated the Montauban to Capdenac line, which it took over on 11 April 1857 while it was still under construction following the failure of the fr:Compagnie du chemin de fer Grand-Central de France. The station is on the north bank of the Aveyron. The imposing neo-18th C station was built in several phases between 1858 and its completion in 1883. It is thought to have been modelled on the then Paris terminus of the CFPO, the Gare d'Austerlitz.

The station was connected to Toulouse on 24 October 1864 when the line from Toulouse-Matabiau to Lexos was opened by the CFPO.

Traffic was originally generated by the output of the steel and mining centers of Aubin and Decazeville, as well as the exploitation of stone quarries in Lexos. The local lime works was transformed into a flourishing cement plant which survived until its sudden closure in 1994. At the beginning of the 1880s, the opening of other routes to Paris marked the decline of the station.

In the 1940s, Lexos was an important railway junction with substantial freight activity and employing dozens of railway workers. During the second half of the 20th century, traffic decreased due to the closure of lines and local industry. By 1999 there were no longer any permanent staff at the station.

It is listed as a single platform "local" station (SNCF classification "C" – less than 100,000 travellers per year). According to SNCF, annual usage in 2014 was 4,720 travellers.

== Protected status ==
The façades and roofs of the passenger building, the engine shed and the goods shed were placed on the Monuments historiques register on 11 July 2007.

== Train services ==
There are seven trains per day in each direction on the TER Occitanie Line 3 (Toulouse – Figeac – Aurillac local service) that stop at Lexos.
