= Puylagarde =

- Commune
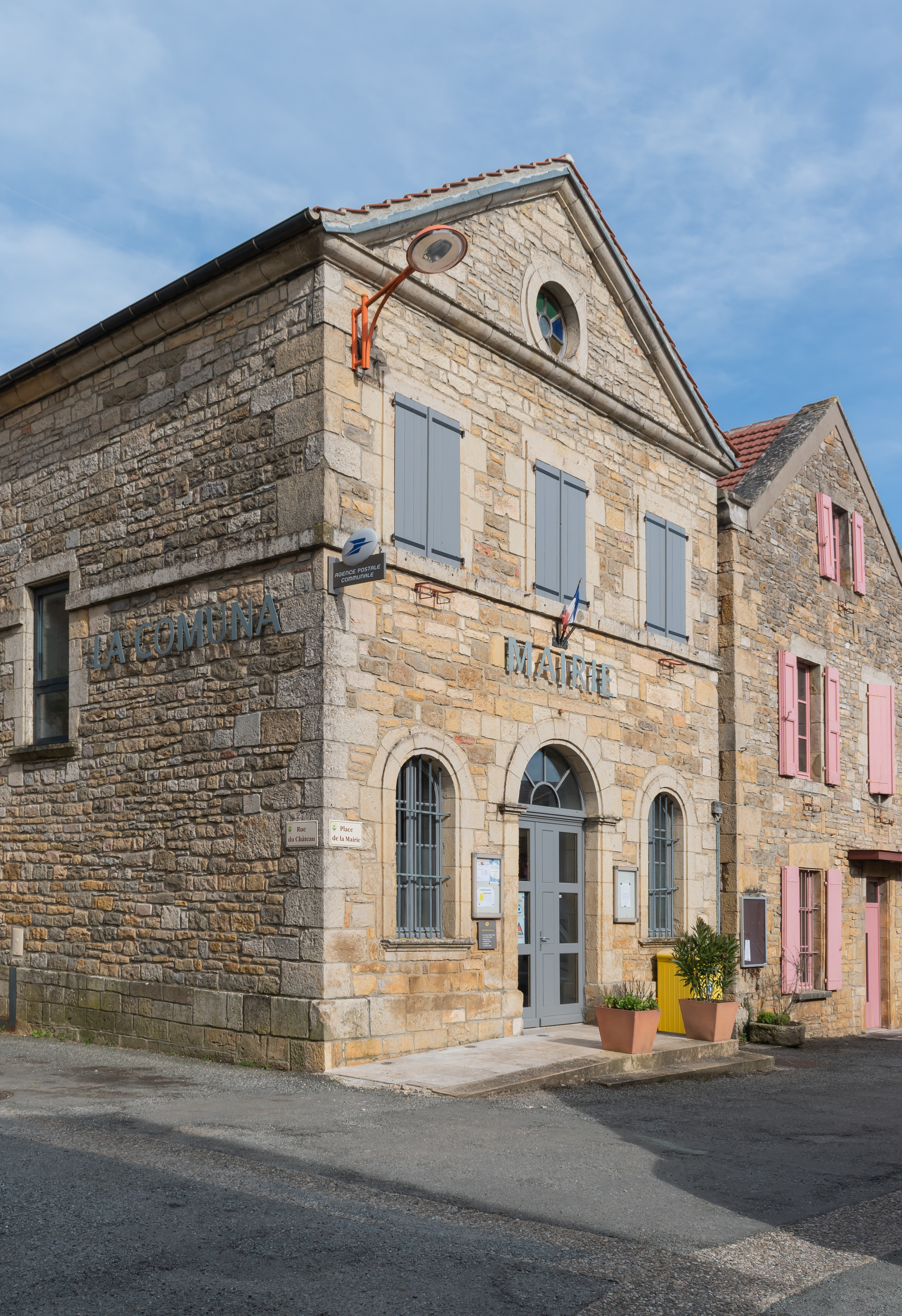
- Town hall of Puylagarde

- Coat of arms
- Location of Puylagarde
- Location within France Location within Occitanie
- Coordinates: 44°17′49″N 1°50′23″E
- Country: France
- Region: Occitania
- Department: Tarn-et-Garonne
- Arrondissement: Montauban
- Canton: Quercy-Rouergue
- Intercommunality: Quercy Rouergue et des Gorges de l'Aveyron

Government
  - Mayor (2020–2026): Alain Virolle
- Area^{1}: 23.14 km^{2} (8.93 sq mi)
- Elevation: 425 m (1,394 ft)
- Highest elevation: 422 m (1,385 ft)
- Lowest elevation: 260 m (850 ft)
- Population (2023): 357
  - Density: 15.4/km^{2} (40.0/sq mi)
- Time zone: UTC+01:00 (CET)
  - Summer (DST): UTC+02:00 (CEST)
- INSEE/Postal code: 82147 /82160
- ^{1} French Land Register data, which excludes lakes, ponds, glaciers > 1 km^{2} (0.386 sq mi or 247 acres) and river estuaries.

Puylagarde (French pronunciation: [pɥilaɡaʁd]; Occitan: Puèg la Garda) is a commune in the Tarn-et-Garonne department in the Occitanie region in southern France.

== See also ==
- Communes of the Tarn-et-Garonne department
