= Saint-Cirq, Tarn-et-Garonne =

Saint-Cirq
- Commune
- Coat of arms
- Location of Saint-Cirq
- Location within France Location within Occitanie
- Coordinates: 44°08′49″N 1°36′24″E
- Country: France
- Region: Occitania
- Department: Tarn-et-Garonne
- Arrondissement: Montauban
- Canton: Quercy-Rouergue
- Intercommunality: Quercy caussadais

Government
  - Mayor (2020–2026): Guy Rouzies
- Area^{1}: 15.96 km^{2} (6.16 sq mi)
- Elevation: 169 m (554 ft)
- Highest elevation: 215 m (705 ft)
- Lowest elevation: 108 m (354 ft)
- Population (2023): 558
  - Density: 35.0/km^{2} (90.6/sq mi)
- Time zone: UTC+01:00 (CET)
  - Summer (DST): UTC+02:00 (CEST)
- INSEE/Postal code: 82159 /82300
- ^{1} French Land Register data, which excludes lakes, ponds, glaciers > 1 km^{2} (0.386 sq mi or 247 acres) and river estuaries.

Saint-Cirq (French pronunciation: [sɛ̃ siʁk]; Occitan: Sent Circ) is a commune in the Tarn-et-Garonne department in the Occitanie region in southern France.

== See also ==
- Communes of the Tarn-et-Garonne department
