= Saint-Georges, Tarn-et-Garonne =

Saint-Georges
- Commune
- Coat of arms
- Location of Saint-Georges
- Location within France Location within Occitanie
- Coordinates: 44°13′23″N 1°38′41″E
- Country: France
- Region: Occitania
- Department: Tarn-et-Garonne
- Arrondissement: Montauban
- Canton: Quercy-Rouergue
- Intercommunality: Quercy caussadais

Government
  - Mayor (2020–2026): Yves Pagès
- Area^{1}: 9.09 km^{2} (3.51 sq mi)
- Elevation: 200 m (660 ft)
- Highest elevation: 281 m (922 ft)
- Lowest elevation: 157 m (515 ft)
- Population (2023): 273
  - Density: 30.0/km^{2} (77.8/sq mi)
- Time zone: UTC+01:00 (CET)
  - Summer (DST): UTC+02:00 (CEST)
- INSEE/Postal code: 82162 /82240
- ^{1} French Land Register data, which excludes lakes, ponds, glaciers > 1 km^{2} (0.386 sq mi or 247 acres) and river estuaries.

Saint-Georges (French pronunciation: [sɛ̃ ʒɔʁʒ]; Languedocien: Sent Jòrdi) is a commune in the Tarn-et-Garonne department in the Occitanie region in southern France.

== See also ==
- Communes of the Tarn-et-Garonne department
