= Cayriech =

- Commune
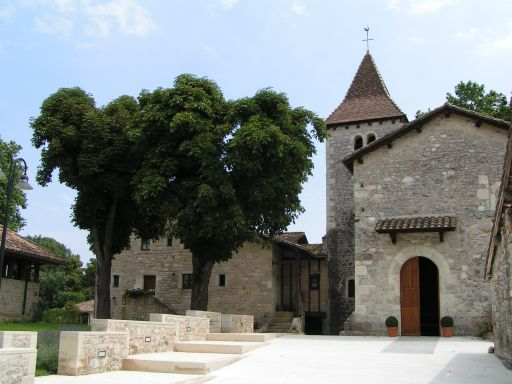
- Cayriech church
- Location of Cayriech
- Location within France Location within Occitanie
- Coordinates: 44°13′10″N 1°36′44″E
- Country: France
- Region: Occitania
- Department: Tarn-et-Garonne
- Arrondissement: Montauban
- Canton: Quercy-Rouergue
- Intercommunality: Quercy caussadais

Government
  - Mayor (2020–2026): Marie-Claude Hermet-Riviere
- Area^{1}: 7.59 km^{2} (2.93 sq mi)
- Elevation: 148 m (486 ft)
- Highest elevation: 184 m (604 ft)
- Lowest elevation: 137 m (449 ft)
- Population (2023): 270
  - Density: 36/km^{2} (92/sq mi)
- Time zone: UTC+01:00 (CET)
  - Summer (DST): UTC+02:00 (CEST)
- INSEE/Postal code: 82040 /82240
- ^{1} French Land Register data, which excludes lakes, ponds, glaciers > 1 km^{2} (0.386 sq mi or 247 acres) and river estuaries.

Cayriech is a commune in the Tarn-et-Garonne department in the Occitanie region in southern France.

== See also ==
- Communes of the Tarn-et-Garonne department
