= Laguépie station =

Railway station in Laguépie, France

Coordinates: 44°08′44″N 1°58′06″E

Laguépie
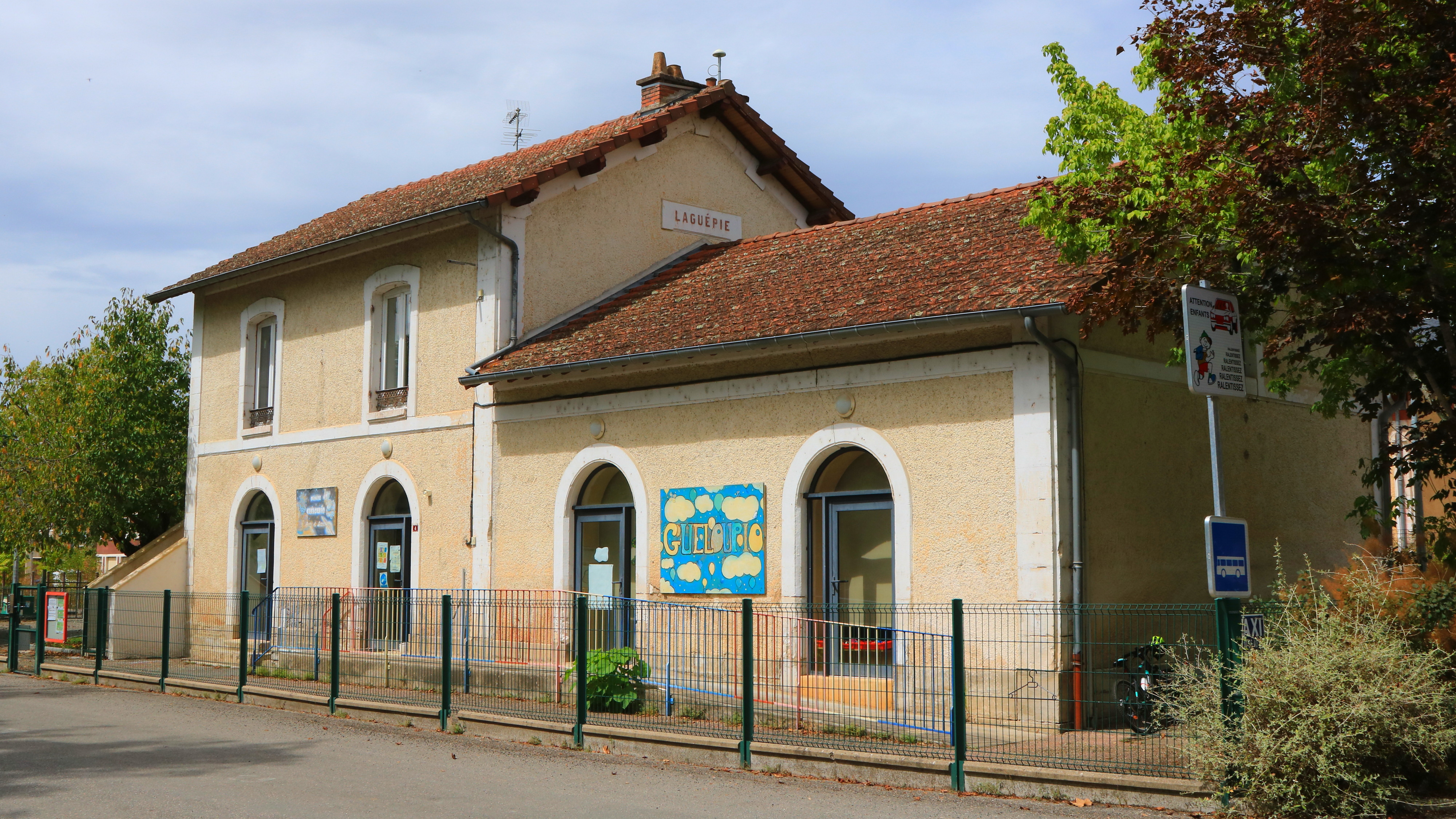
Location

Laguépie is a railway station in Laguépie, Occitanie, France. The station is on the Brive–Toulouse (via Capdenac) railway line. The station is served by TER (local) services operated by SNCF.

== Train services ==
The following services currently call at Laguépie:

- local service (TER Occitanie) Toulouse–Figeac–Aurillac

Preceding station	TER Occitanie	Following station
Lexos towards Toulouse	3	Najac towards Aurillac
