= Canton of Montauban-1 =

Canton of France

- Canton
- Interactive map of Canton of Montauban-1
- Coordinates: 44°04′34″N 1°19′46″E
- Country: France
- Region: Occitanie
- Department: Tarn-et-Garonne
- Commune: Montauban
- Reorganised: March 2015
- Seat: Montauban

The Canton of Montauban-1 is one of the 15 cantons of the Tarn-et-Garonne department, in southern France. Since the French canton reorganisation which came into effect in March 2015, the canton covers the western part of the commune of Montauban.
