= Féneyrols =

- Commune
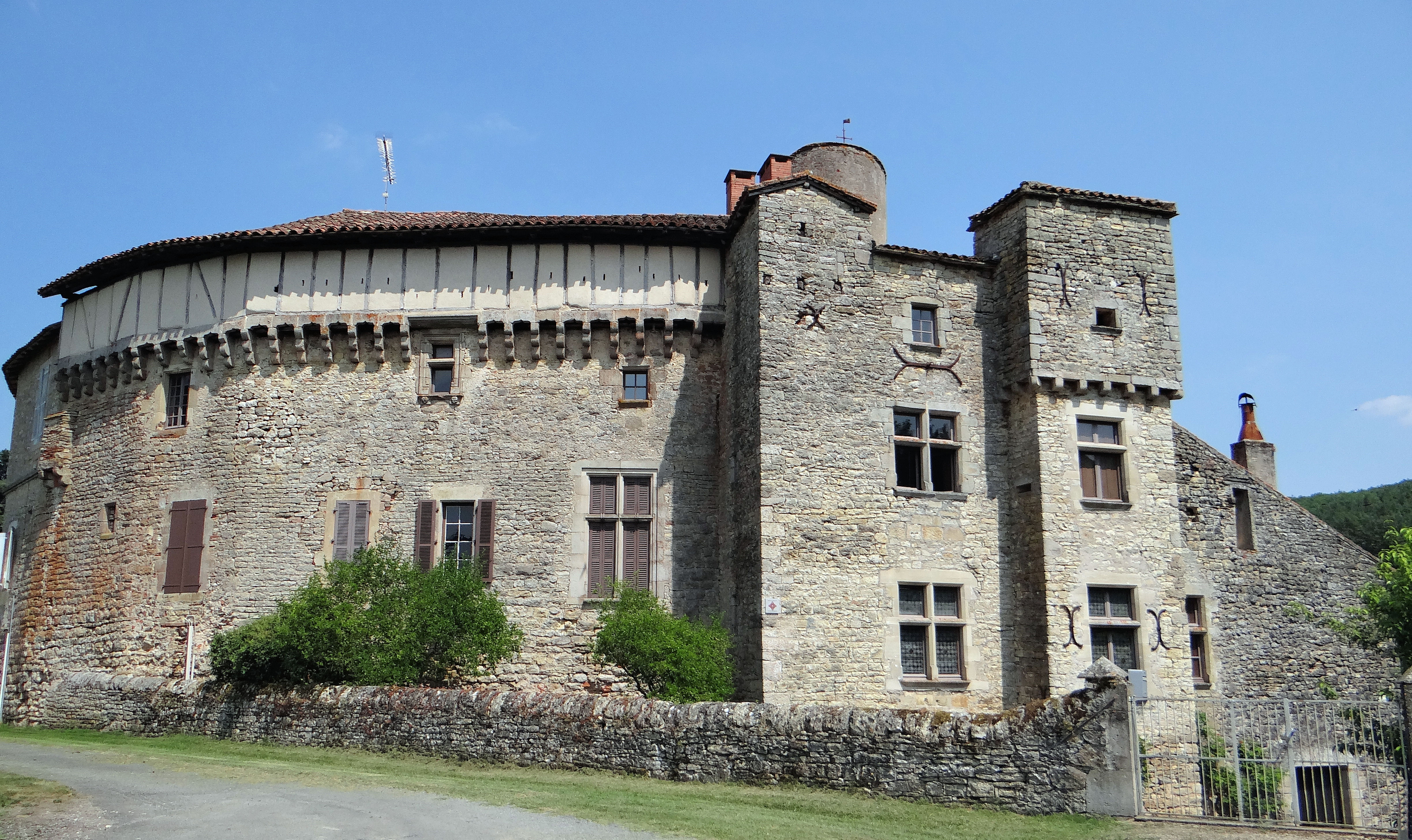
- The Château of Féneyrols
- Location of Féneyrols
- Location within France Location within Occitanie
- Coordinates: 44°07′54″N 1°49′14″E
- Country: France
- Region: Occitania
- Department: Tarn-et-Garonne
- Arrondissement: Montauban
- Canton: Quercy-Rouergue
- Intercommunality: Quercy Rouergue et des Gorges de l'Aveyron

Government
  - Mayor (2020–2026): Christian Galland
- Area^{1}: 14.88 km^{2} (5.75 sq mi)
- Elevation: 133 m (436 ft)
- Highest elevation: 422 m (1,385 ft)
- Lowest elevation: 114 m (374 ft)
- Population (2023): 176
  - Density: 11.8/km^{2} (30.6/sq mi)
- Time zone: UTC+01:00 (CET)
  - Summer (DST): UTC+02:00 (CEST)
- INSEE/Postal code: 82061 /82140
- ^{1} French Land Register data, which excludes lakes, ponds, glaciers > 1 km^{2} (0.386 sq mi or 247 acres) and river estuaries.

Féneyrols (French pronunciation: [feneʁɔl]; Occitan: Fenairòls) is a commune in the Tarn-et-Garonne department in the Occitanie region in southern France.

== See also ==
- Communes of the Tarn-et-Garonne department
