= Bastide (surname) =

Bastide is a French surname. Notable people with the surname include:

- John Henry Bastide, British soldier and military engineer
- Jules Bastide, French politician
- Lauren Bastide (born 1981), French journalist
- Paul Bastide, French conductor and composer
- Roger Bastide, French sociologist and anthropologist
