= Cazals, Tarn-et-Garonne =

Cazals
- Commune
- Coat of arms
- Location of Cazals
- Location within France Location within Occitanie
- Coordinates: 44°07′21″N 1°43′00″E
- Country: France
- Region: Occitania
- Department: Tarn-et-Garonne
- Arrondissement: Montauban
- Canton: Quercy-Rouergue
- Intercommunality: Quercy Rouergue et des gorges de l'Aveyron

Government
  - Mayor (2023–2026): Catherine Bages
- Area^{1}: 11.73 km^{2} (4.53 sq mi)
- Elevation: 144 m (472 ft)
- Highest elevation: 325 m (1,066 ft)
- Lowest elevation: 110 m (360 ft)
- Population (2023): 236
  - Density: 20.1/km^{2} (52.1/sq mi)
- Time zone: UTC+01:00 (CET)
  - Summer (DST): UTC+02:00 (CEST)
- INSEE/Postal code: 82041 /82140
- ^{1} French Land Register data, which excludes lakes, ponds, glaciers > 1 km^{2} (0.386 sq mi or 247 acres) and river estuaries.

Cazals is a commune in the Tarn-et-Garonne department in the Occitanie region in southern France.

== See also ==
- Communes of the Tarn-et-Garonne department
