= Caylus, Tarn-et-Garonne =

Caylus
- Commune
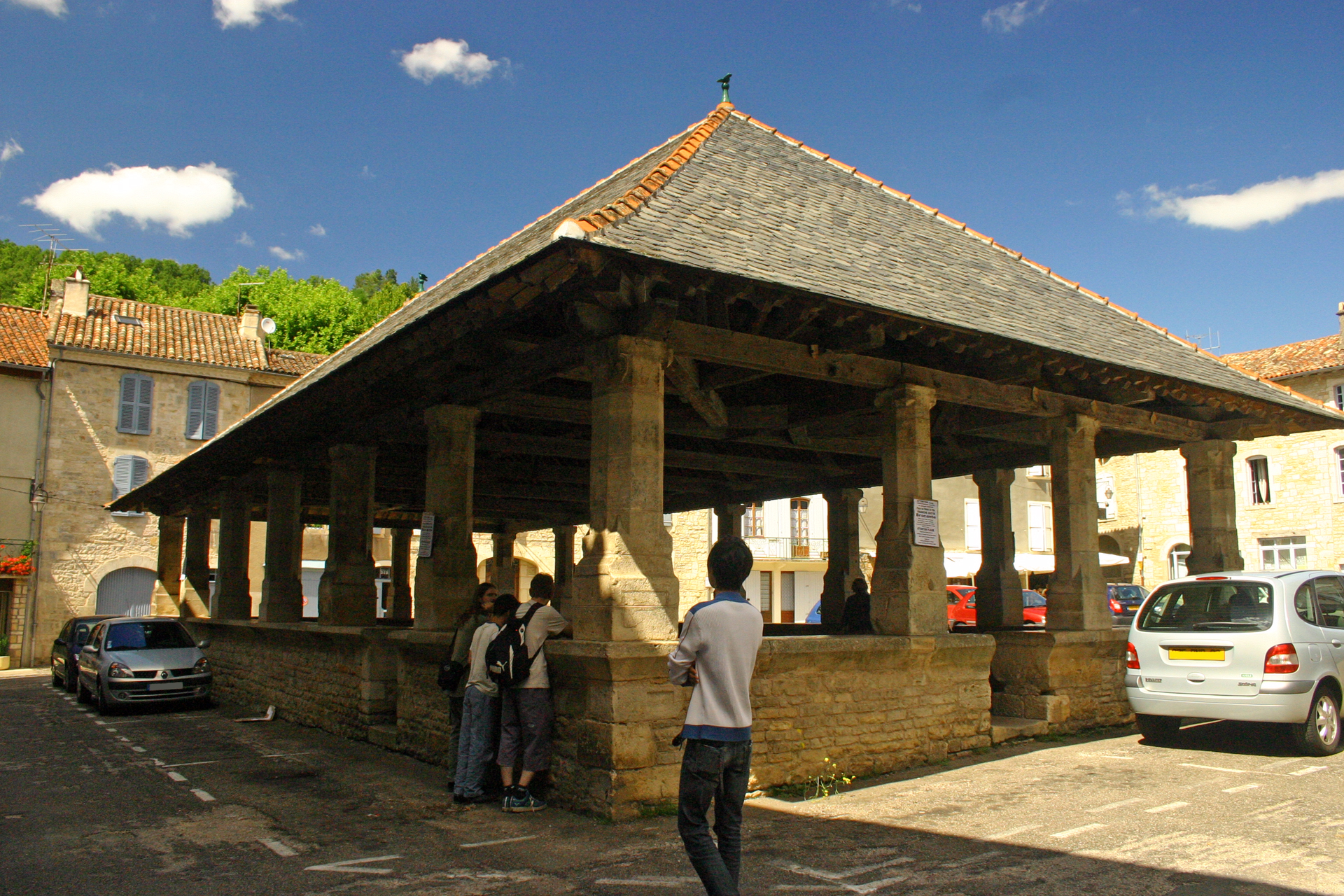
- Caylus village square

- Coat of arms
- Location of Caylus
- Location within France Location within Occitanie
- Coordinates: 44°14′12″N 1°46′18″E
- Country: France
- Region: Occitania
- Department: Tarn-et-Garonne
- Arrondissement: Montauban
- Canton: Quercy-Rouergue
- Intercommunality: CC du Quercy Rouergue et des Gorges de l'Aveyron

Government
  - Mayor (2020–2026): Vincent Cousi
- Area^{1}: 96.79 km^{2} (37.37 sq mi)
- Elevation: 235 m (771 ft)
- Highest elevation: 385 m (1,263 ft)
- Lowest elevation: 170 m (560 ft)
- Population (2023): 1,445
  - Density: 14.93/km^{2} (38.67/sq mi)
- Time zone: UTC+01:00 (CET)
  - Summer (DST): UTC+02:00 (CEST)
- INSEE/Postal code: 82038 /82160
- ^{1} French Land Register data, which excludes lakes, ponds, glaciers > 1 km^{2} (0.386 sq mi or 247 acres) and river estuaries.

Caylus (French pronunciation: [kajlys]; Languedocien: Cailutz) is a commune in the Tarn-et-Garonne department in the Occitanie region in southern France. Its inhabitants are called Caylusiens and Caylusiennes.

== City ==
Caylus is famous for a castle built before 1176, and was owned by Raymond V of Toulouse at the time. It was taken by Simon de Montfort in 1211, before moving into the royal domain in 1270. In 1562, the city was sacked by the troops Calvinists of Symphorien Durfort, lord of Duras. In 1622, Louis XIII established headquarters here during the siege of Saint-Antonin.

Évariste Régis Huc, C.M. (1813–1860), a French Catholic priest, Lazarite missionary, and traveller was born in Caylus.

== See also ==
- Communes of the Tarn-et-Garonne department
