= Rouergue =

Former province of France

Coordinates: 44.33°N 2.62°E

Coat of arms of the county of Rouergue

Map of Rouergue, showing modern departments: Aveyron, Lot and Tarn-et-Garonne

Rouergue (French: [ʁwɛʁɡ]; Occitan: Roergue [ruˈeɾɣe]) is a former province of France, corresponding roughly with the modern department of Aveyron. Its historical capital is Rodez. It is bounded on the north by Auvergne, on the south and southwest by Languedoc, on the east by Gévaudan and on the west by Quercy.

During the Middle Ages Rouergue changed hands a number of times; its rulers included England (due to the Treaty of Brétigny in 1360), Armagnac and Languedoc.

Rouergue became a department in 1790, and was renamed Aveyron after the principal river flowing through it. Upon creation of the department of Tarn-et-Garonne in 1808, the canton of Saint-Antonin-Noble-Val was detached from the western extremity of Aveyron and transferred to the new department.

The province of Rouergue had a land area of 9,007 km^{2} (3,478 sq mi). At the 1999 census there were 269,774 inhabitants on the territory of the province of Rouergue, for a density of only 30 km^{2} (12 sq mi). The largest urban areas are Rodez, with 38,458 inhabitants in 1999; Millau, with 22,840 inhabitants in 1999; Decazeville, with 17,044 inhabitants in 1999; and Villefranche-de-Rouergue, with 12,561 inhabitants in 1999.

== See also ==
- Count of Rouergue
- Count of Toulouse
