= Canton of Montauban-3 =

Coordinates: 44.01°N 1.36°E

The Canton of Montauban-3 is one of the 15 cantons of the Tarn-et-Garonne department, in southern France. Since the French canton reorganisation which came into effect in March 2015, the canton covers the southeastern part of the commune of Montauban.
