= Varen, Tarn-et-Garonne =

Varen
- Commune
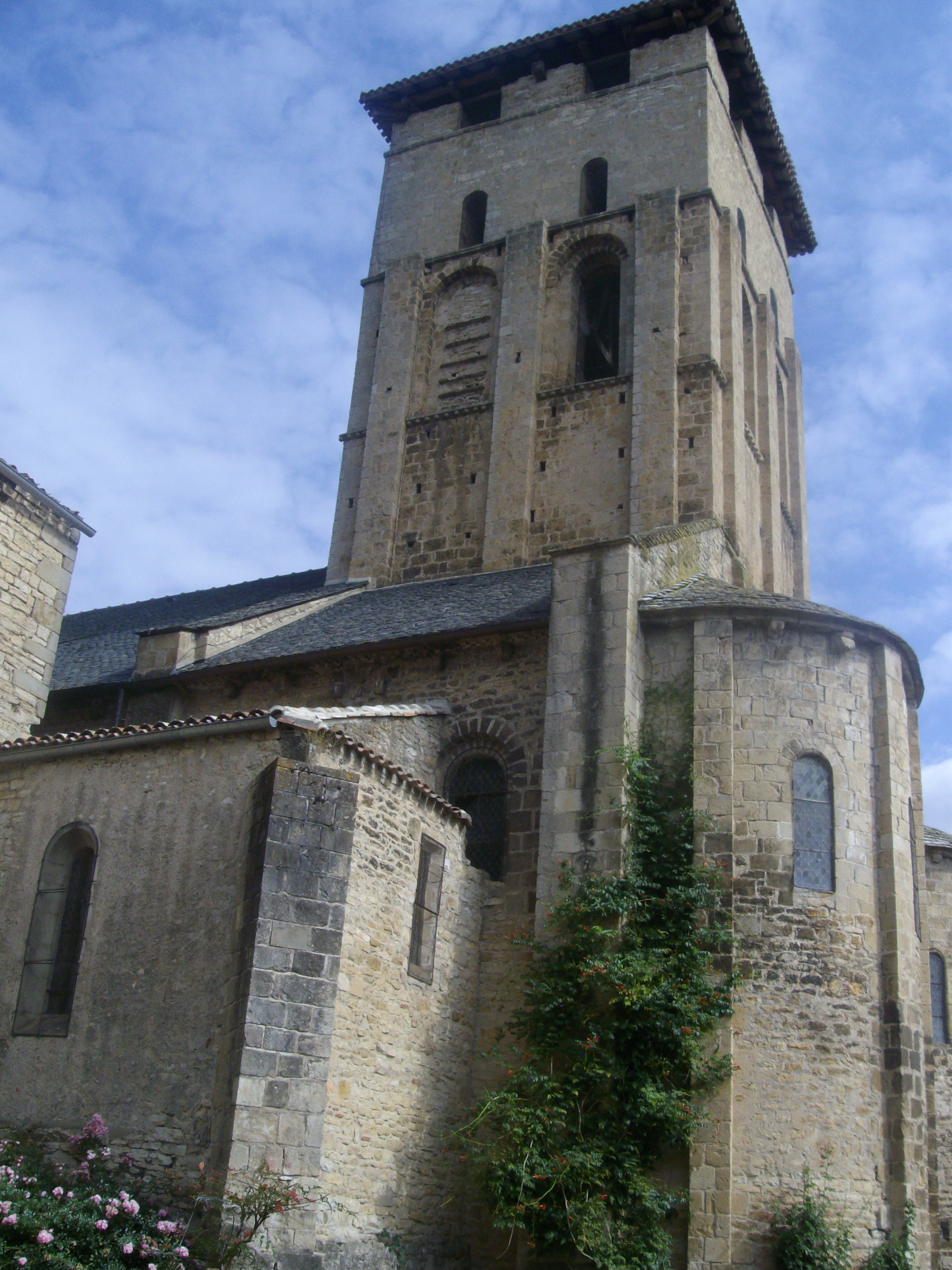
- The church of Saint-Pierre, in Varen

- Coat of arms
- Location of Varen
- Location within France Location within Occitanie
- Coordinates: 44°09′33″N 1°53′42″E
- Country: France
- Region: Occitania
- Department: Tarn-et-Garonne
- Arrondissement: Montauban
- Canton: Quercy-Rouergue
- Intercommunality: Quercy Rouergue et des Gorges de l'Aveyron

Government
  - Mayor (2020–2026): Pierre Hebrard
- Area^{1}: 23.13 km^{2} (8.93 sq mi)
- Elevation: 160 m (520 ft)
- Highest elevation: 372 m (1,220 ft)
- Lowest elevation: 118 m (387 ft)
- Population (2023): 640
  - Density: 28/km^{2} (72/sq mi)
- Time zone: UTC+01:00 (CET)
  - Summer (DST): UTC+02:00 (CEST)
- INSEE/Postal code: 82187 /82330
- ^{1} French Land Register data, which excludes lakes, ponds, glaciers > 1 km^{2} (0.386 sq mi or 247 acres) and river estuaries.

Varen is a commune in the Tarn-et-Garonne department in the Occitanie region in southern France. Lexos station has rail connections to Toulouse, Figeac and Aurillac.

== See also ==
- Communes of the Tarn-et-Garonne department
