= Parisot, Tarn-et-Garonne =

Parisot
- Commune
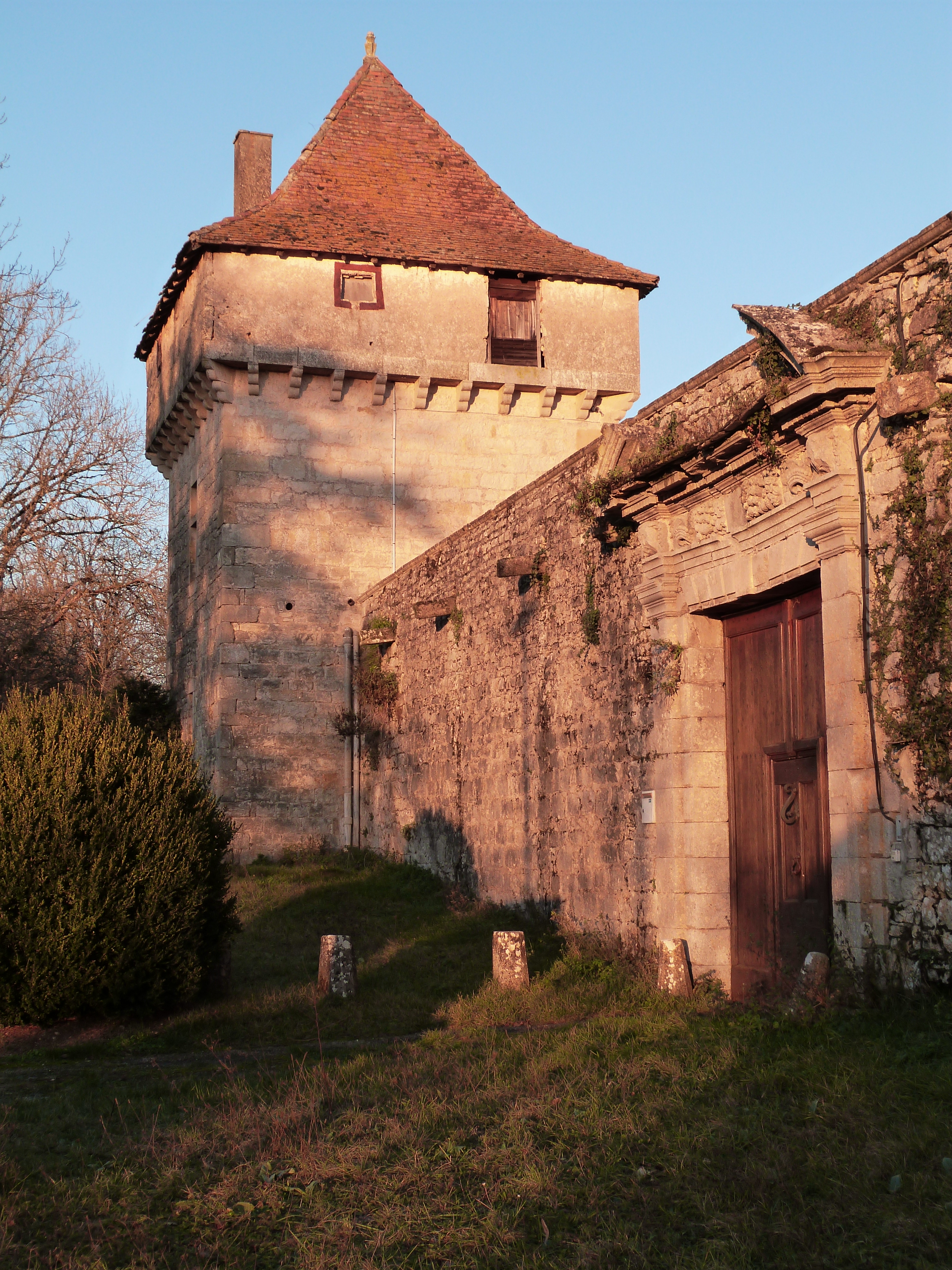
- The square tower of the Château of Cornusson, in Parisot

- Coat of arms
- Location of Parisot
- Location within France Location within Occitanie
- Coordinates: 44°15′59″N 1°51′27″E
- Country: France
- Region: Occitania
- Department: Tarn-et-Garonne
- Arrondissement: Montauban
- Canton: Quercy-Rouergue
- Intercommunality: Quercy Rouergue et des Gorges de l'Aveyron

Government
  - Mayor (2020–2026): Alain Iches
- Area^{1}: 27.86 km^{2} (10.76 sq mi)
- Elevation: 375 m (1,230 ft)
- Highest elevation: 425 m (1,394 ft)
- Lowest elevation: 230 m (750 ft)
- Population (2023): 557
  - Density: 20.0/km^{2} (51.8/sq mi)
- Time zone: UTC+01:00 (CET)
  - Summer (DST): UTC+02:00 (CEST)
- INSEE/Postal code: 82137 /82160
- ^{1} French Land Register data, which excludes lakes, ponds, glaciers > 1 km^{2} (0.386 sq mi or 247 acres) and river estuaries.

Parisot is a commune in the Tarn-et-Garonne department in the Occitanie region in southern France.

It is twinned with Great Hucklow - a rural village of similar size in the Derbyshire Peak District, England.

== See also ==
- Communes of the Tarn-et-Garonne department
