= Castanet, Tarn-et-Garonne =

Castanet
- Commune
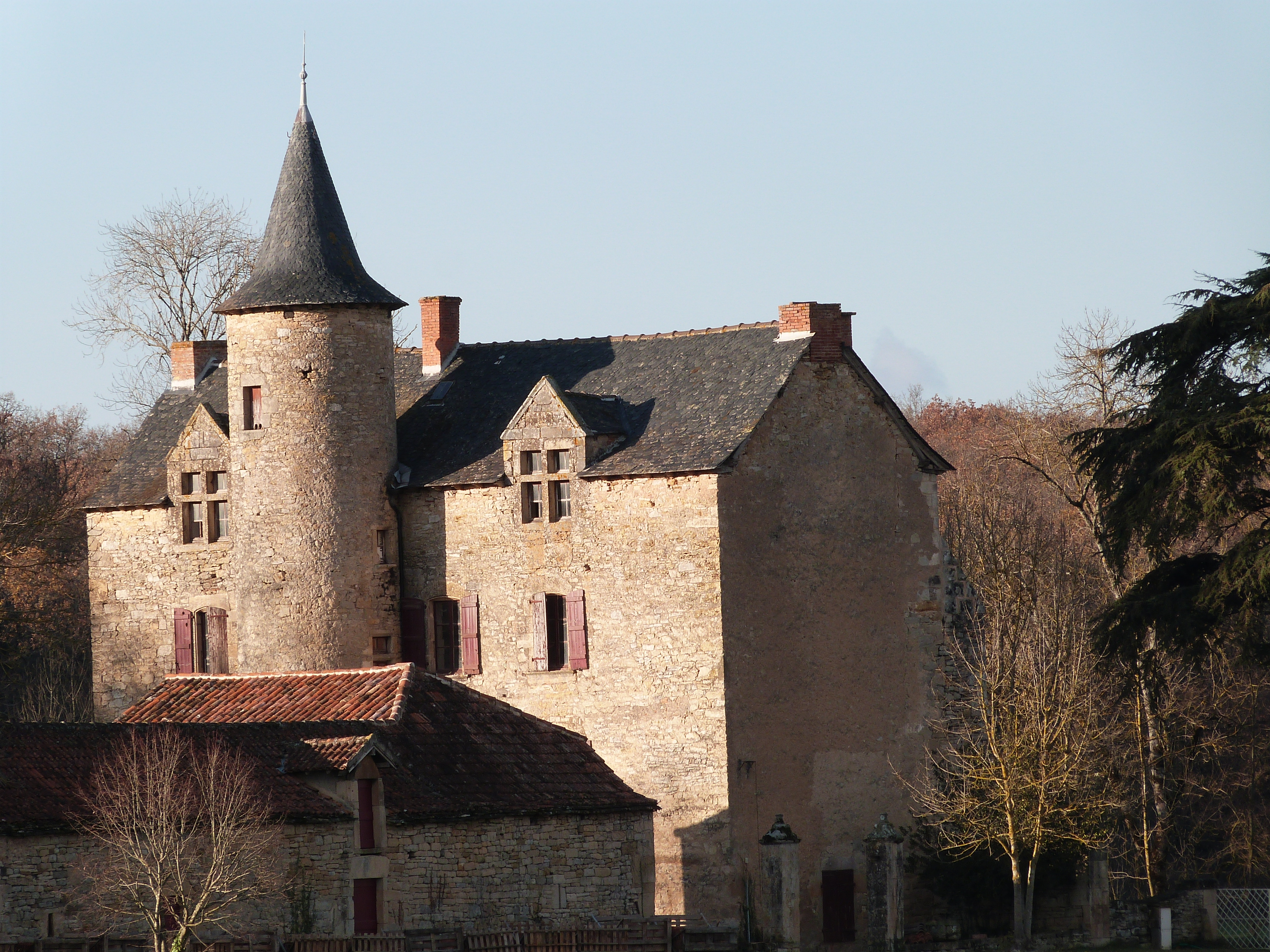
- The Château of Cambayrac, in Castanet
- Location of Castanet
- Location within France Location within Occitanie
- Coordinates: 44°16′03″N 1°57′03″E
- Country: France
- Region: Occitania
- Department: Tarn-et-Garonne
- Arrondissement: Montauban
- Canton: Quercy-Rouergue
- Intercommunality: Quercy Rouergue et des gorges de l'Aveyron

Government
  - Mayor (2020–2026): Michel Tabarly
- Area^{1}: 22.07 km^{2} (8.52 sq mi)
- Elevation: 450 m (1,480 ft)
- Highest elevation: 506 m (1,660 ft)
- Lowest elevation: 252 m (827 ft)
- Population (2023): 264
  - Density: 12.0/km^{2} (31.0/sq mi)
- Time zone: UTC+01:00 (CET)
  - Summer (DST): UTC+02:00 (CEST)
- INSEE/Postal code: 82029 /82160
- ^{1} French Land Register data, which excludes lakes, ponds, glaciers > 1 km^{2} (0.386 sq mi or 247 acres) and river estuaries.

Castanet is a commune in the Tarn-et-Garonne department in the Occitanie region in southern France.

It has had a peak population of 1,137 inhabitants in 1806; its inhabitants are called Castanetais or Castanetaises.

== See also ==
- Communes of the Tarn-et-Garonne department
