= Caussade =

- Commune
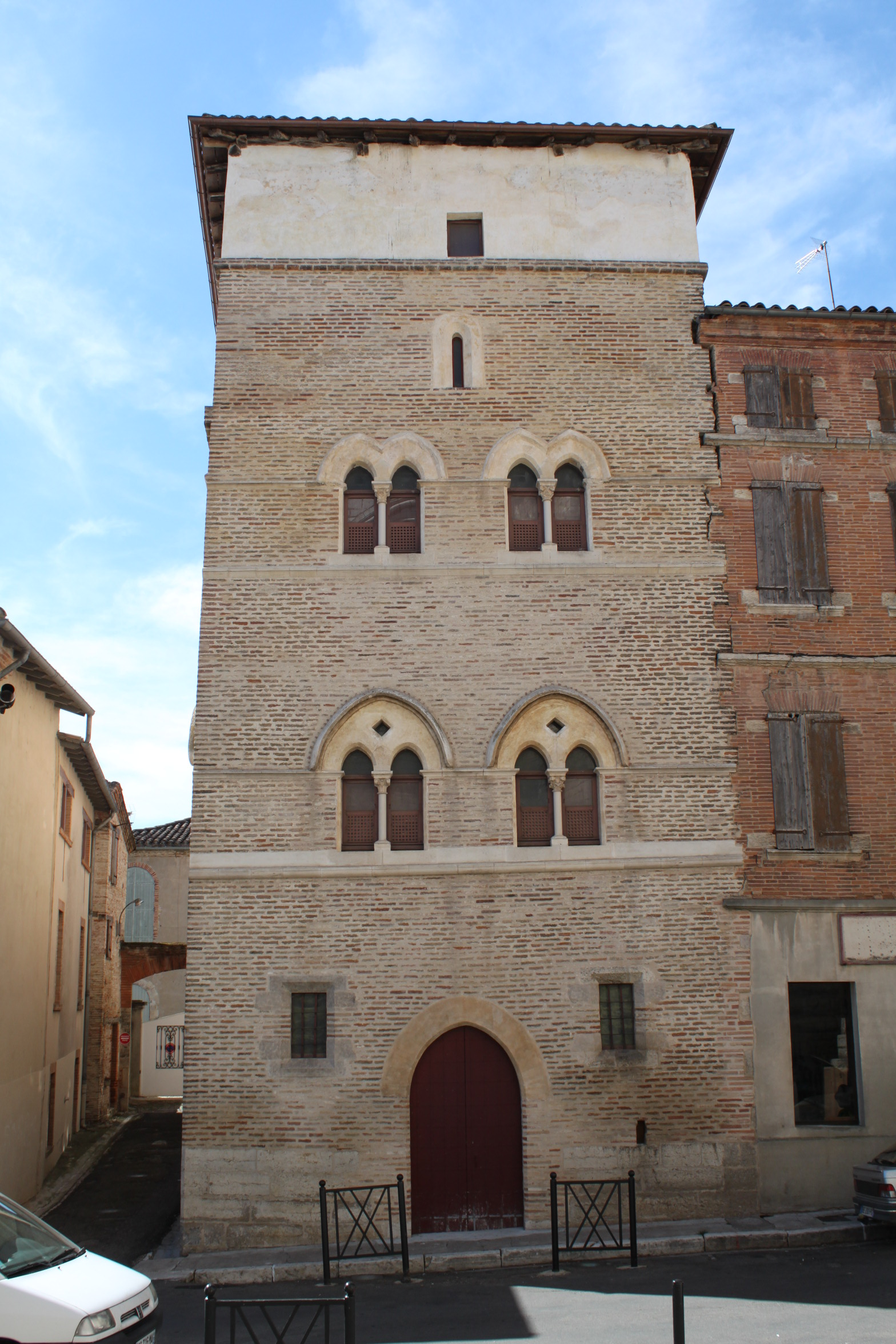
- The tower of Arlet, in Caussade

- Coat of arms
- Location of Caussade
- Location within France Location within Occitanie
- Coordinates: 44°09′44″N 1°32′16″E
- Country: France
- Region: Occitania
- Department: Tarn-et-Garonne
- Arrondissement: Montauban
- Canton: Aveyron-Lère
- Intercommunality: Quercy caussadais

Government
  - Mayor (2020–2026): Gérard Hebrard
- Area^{1}: 45.73 km^{2} (17.66 sq mi)
- Elevation: 109 m (358 ft)
- Highest elevation: 208 m (682 ft)
- Lowest elevation: 95 m (312 ft)
- Population (2023): 6,803
  - Density: 148.8/km^{2} (385.3/sq mi)
- Time zone: UTC+01:00 (CET)
  - Summer (DST): UTC+02:00 (CEST)
- INSEE/Postal code: 82037 /82300
- ^{1} French Land Register data, which excludes lakes, ponds, glaciers > 1 km^{2} (0.386 sq mi or 247 acres) and river estuaries.

Caussade is a commune in the district of Montauban, located in the Tarn-et-Garonne department in the Occitanie region in the south of France.

Caussade, an ancient city of the white Quercy or lower Quercy, it is located in the hills of Quercy and nicknamed "hat city" due to milliner production in the late nineteenth and early twentieth century. The straw hat, the famous boater was made in Caussade.

The inhabitants are called the Caussadais and Caussadaises.

== Geography ==
Caussade is situated in the valley of the Lère, a tributary of the Aveyron. For two kilometers, geological mutations overwhelm the landscape, leaving the plateau of Limognes and its western and southern extension as a low Jurassic plateau. Further descent into the former Oligocene Gulf of Monteils leads to the former floodplain of the Aveyron, which meets the Tarn downstream from Montauban. The plateau, from karstic rock edaphic, has soil that is poor and dry but this gives way to green valleys and fruit, common in the Valley of the Garonne. The plateaus of limestone are permeable, with the notable exception of sinkholes, and ouvalas covered with clay and siderolithic deposits of Phosphor. Precipitation sometimes exceeds 850 mm annually.

== Population ==
The town has 6,858 inhabitants in 3,382 households, and a population density of 150 per square kilometre (2022). The home ownership rate is 49.1%. It forms an urban unit with the neighbouring, smaller commune Monteils.

Historical population
Year	Pop.	±% p.a.
1968	5,368	—
1975	5,548	+0.47%
1982	5,933	+0.96%
1990	6,009	+0.16%
1999	5,971	−0.07%
2007	6,508	+1.08%
2012	6,701	+0.59%
2017	6,863	+0.48%
2023	6,803	−0.15%
Source: INSEE

== Toponymy ==
The town takes its name from the Occitan caussada, French equivalent of "floor" (and from low Latin (via) calciata) designating a route consists of tightly packed stones, calciare "tread or pack" in the sense of "high road", "road furnished". The tower in the coat of arms symbolises heavy stone construction, the strength of the world.

== History ==
Gallo-Roman relics are often found around Caussade. In particular the Bénéchie, vases, medals, bronzes, gold coins and silver coins in particular struck at the time of Titus. Wooden spindles showing a wool textile industry have been unearthed at the bottom of a well filled in 1710.

However, most ceramic deposits cannot be associated with the Gallo-Roman period. Observation shows they date from the late medieval or modern times. Remains of furnaces or remnants of deposits for production, in the form of bricks and tiles, are located near populated areas and on farms or in villages.

The southern Quercy area is already a world apart at the end of the 12th Century. The prodigious growth of the fortified town of Mons Albanus or Mont Alban, allows the new town of Montauban to shine on the flat country where the Tarn and Aveyron rivers converge. At the expense of Moissac Abbey, the austere cahorsin Jacques Duez, Pope under the name John XXII, seals the domination by creating the diocese of Montauban in 1317.

Following the breakup of the County of Rodez in 1486, Caussade became the capital of a fortified barony. The last count of Rodez, Charles d'Armagnac, had been in favour of his illegitimate son Pierre taking the lordship. In 1562, the barony fell to Cardinal Georges d'Armagnac. In retaliation, the town was sacked by the Huguenot Duras. Georges d'Armagnac sold it in 1583 to Jacques Villeneuve, prior of the bream in Toulouse. The nephew of the prior resold it to the Duke of Sully. The son of the Duke pledges to Alliès family until the Revolution.

From 1560, Caussade was a Protestant area in the orbit of Montauban, the capital of a Reformed Southwest. Besieged, the small Calvinist fortress went to the troops of Louis XIII during the first campaign in 1621. Caussade depended on the election and stewardship of Montauban and the parliament of Toulouse. Contrasting with the slow erasure of Haut-Quercy, the last two centuries of the Ancien Régime are the economic heyday of this prosperous southern area, diversified agriculture, viticulture and arboriculture refined the remarkable industrial dynamics, driven by textile and mills.

In the seventeenth and eighteenth century, Bordeaux's proximity began to touch the valleys of the Quercy. Old polyculture here and there supplemented by dyeing and textile crops, declines. Industrial crops regress in 1830, apart from tobacco.

After 1850, fruit and vegetable crops characterise the country of the Garonne. Until 1900, rail encouraged the production and export of tomatoes, peas, beans, onions, asparagus and cauliflower plus artichokes and melons in a few areas. After the crises of the vine by phylloxera between 1880 and 1900, fruit crops were grown, especially plums, cherries and table grapes.

Economic change in industrial France after 1850 dramatically increased emigration to attractive areas or major cities and the northern areas, causing an exodus compounded by the population decline of the world wars. Caussade, did not avoid the demographic decline.

The Straw Hat industry was born from a cottage industry, using "pailloles" braided by shepherdesses of sheep as straw hats. Gathered at Caussade and Septfonds the pailloles are sewn and are used to make hats. The initiative came from Lady Petronilla Cantecor (1762-1846), born "Gleye" at a place called Bourrou, in the parish of St. Martin de Cesquières, a town of Caussade and of peasant origin selling at the market. In 1860, the services of the railway are a boon to the hat industry, since heavy modern machines ship easily to the station platform. Soon local straw is insufficient, it is imported from Italy or in the form of rice straw from the Far East.

Benefiting from the arrival of the railroad, attractive Caussade showed a slight increase in population. The imperial census published 10 January 1867 revealed a population of 4208 inhabitants, more than half, or 2495 in the caussadaise agglomeration.

But the demographic stagnation gave way to a slow decline. By the early 1880s, the town with its preserved houses of the 13th and 14th century, had exceeded 4000 inhabitants. Straw hat Factories, stamens and cadis animate the heart of the old city, while in the neighborhood or surrounding areas, a considerable number of lime kiln and brick kilns remain in business. The agricultural show promotes agricultural production, and fruit farms. A stallion station confirms the ancient forage quality of the plain. Besides this common canvas, the once flourishing trade of grains, flour, saffron, fruits, truffles and poultry continues.

The hat industry suffered the vagaries of fashion and collapses. Chapelleries were still active in 1930, they used other materials, felt or textiles of knit takes over.

In 1923 the population had 3630 inhabitants. By road the village is 24 kilometers from Montauban. It is served by the railway Orléans-Limoges-Toulouse. Activities in order of importance are Electromechanical, headgear, grains, the farming of poultry, and phosphates.

The railway station at Caussade used to export phosphate of lime. Deposits of cantons de Caylus, Caussade and Saint-Antonin were operated from 1870 by an industrial company, Compagnie des Phosphates du Midi. These compact masses phosphorite whitish, pale grey or yellow or red in colour are similar to the Natterjack and were also crushed and used as fertilizer locally.

Caussade is also the headquarters of large international groups such as Caussade Seeds (creating and placing on the market genetics seeds for arable crops and forage production) and EMPA (human machine interface).
