= Verfeil, Tarn-et-Garonne =

Verfeil
- Commune
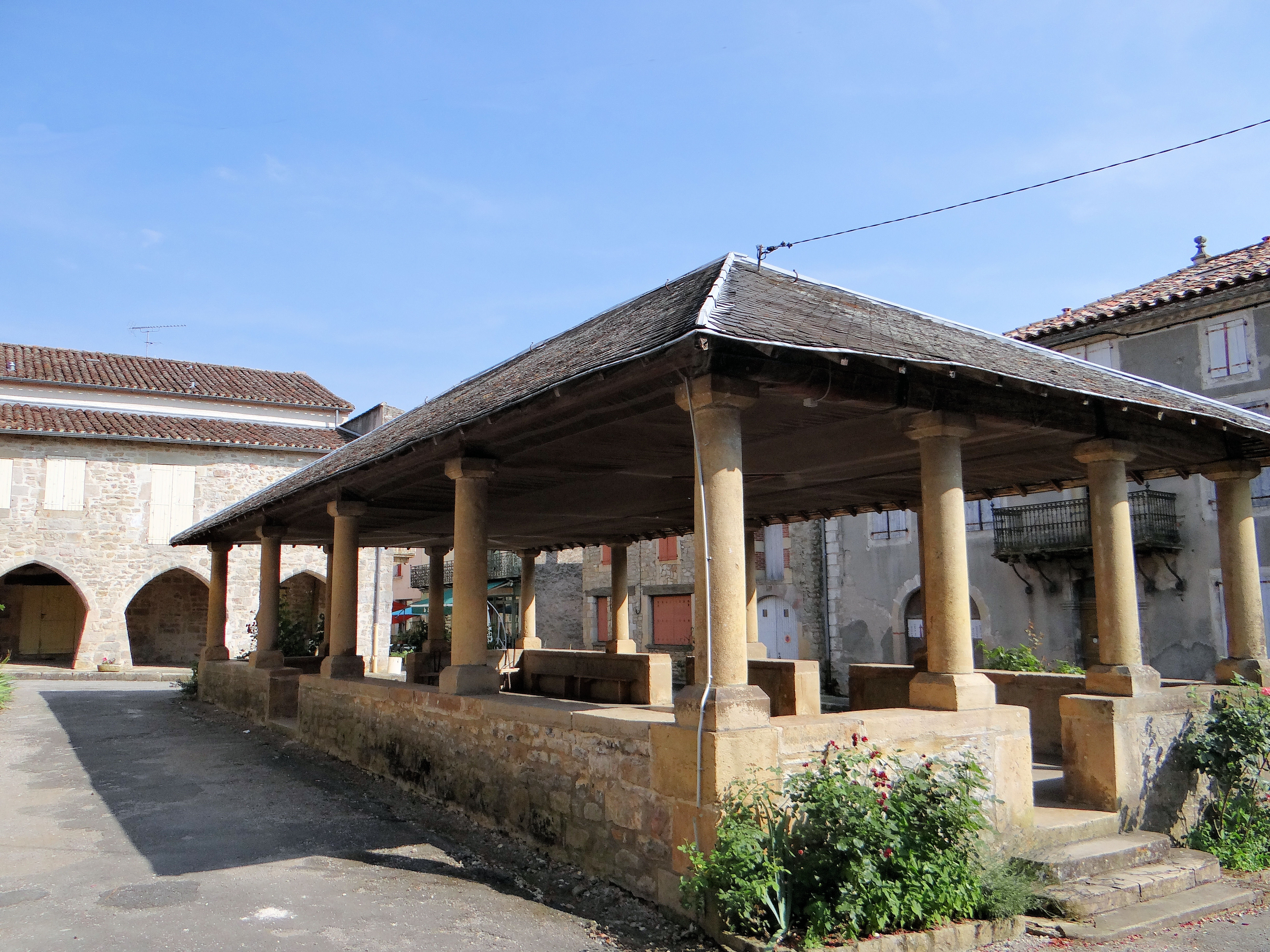
- The covered marketplace in Verfeil

- Coat of arms
- Location of Verfeil
- Location within France Location within Occitanie
- Coordinates: 44°11′14″N 1°52′38″E
- Country: France
- Region: Occitania
- Department: Tarn-et-Garonne
- Arrondissement: Montauban
- Canton: Quercy-Rouergue
- Intercommunality: Quercy Rouergue et des Gorges de l'Aveyron

Government
  - Mayor (2023–2026): Didier Chardenet
- Area^{1}: 18.46 km^{2} (7.13 sq mi)
- Elevation: 185 m (607 ft)
- Highest elevation: 383 m (1,257 ft)
- Lowest elevation: 150 m (490 ft)
- Population (2023): 402
  - Density: 21.8/km^{2} (56.4/sq mi)
- Time zone: UTC+01:00 (CET)
  - Summer (DST): UTC+02:00 (CEST)
- INSEE/Postal code: 82191 /82330
- ^{1} French Land Register data, which excludes lakes, ponds, glaciers > 1 km^{2} (0.386 sq mi or 247 acres) and river estuaries.

Verfeil (French pronunciation: [vɛʁfɛj]; Occitan: Verfuèlh) is a commune in the Tarn-et-Garonne department in the Occitanie region in southern France.

== See also ==
- Communes of the Tarn-et-Garonne department
