= Espinas =

- Commune
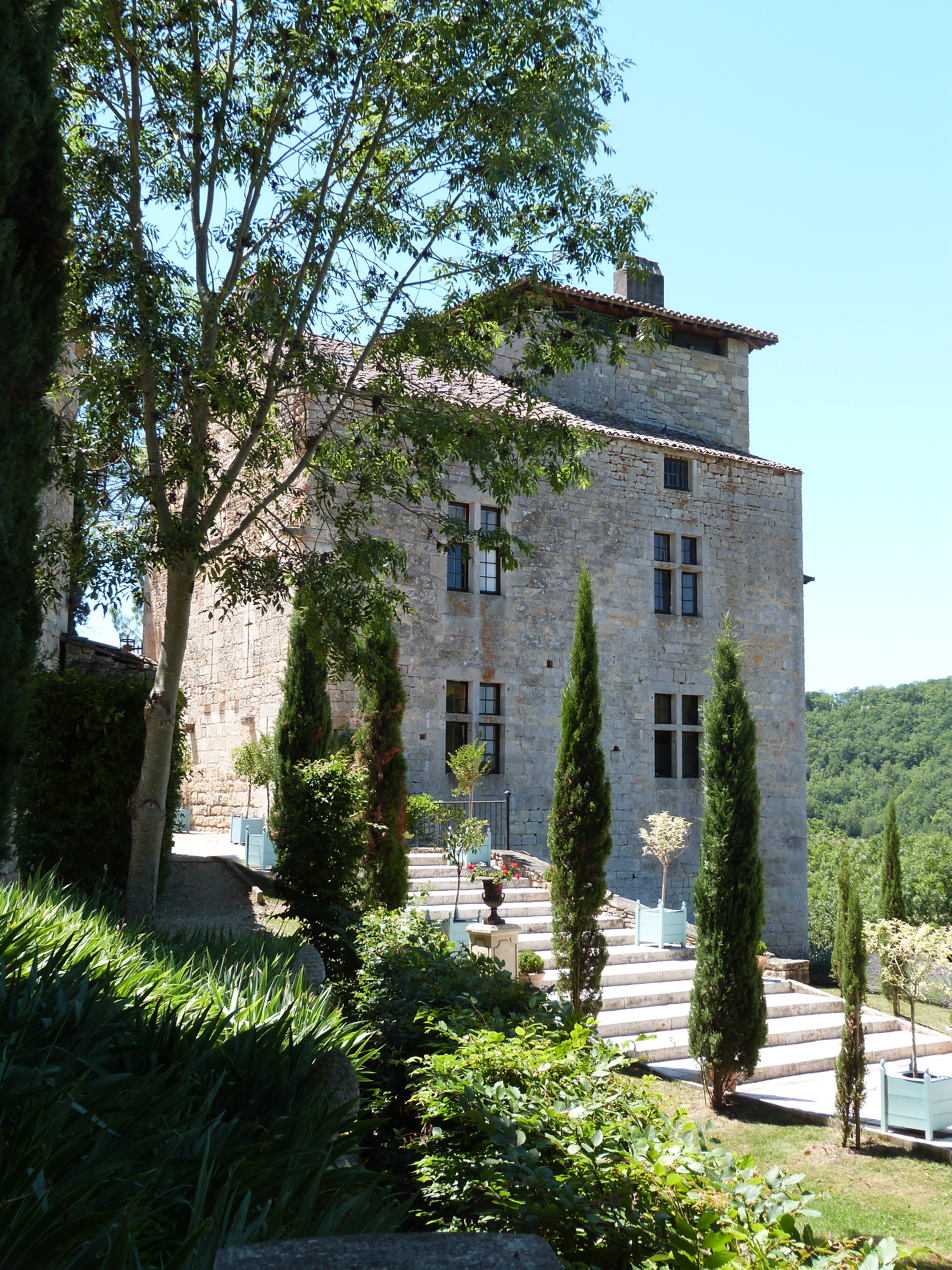
- The Château de Cas, in Espinas
- Location of Espinas
- Location within France Location within Occitanie
- Coordinates: 44°11′49″N 1°49′46″E
- Country: France
- Region: Occitania
- Department: Tarn-et-Garonne
- Arrondissement: Montauban
- Canton: Quercy-Rouergue
- Intercommunality: CC du Quercy Rouergue et des Gorges de l'Aveyron

Government
  - Mayor (2020–2026): Daniel Feral
- Area^{1}: 16.15 km^{2} (6.24 sq mi)
- Elevation: 195 m (640 ft)
- Highest elevation: 392 m (1,286 ft)
- Lowest elevation: 151 m (495 ft)
- Population (2023): 211
  - Density: 13.1/km^{2} (33.8/sq mi)
- Time zone: UTC+01:00 (CET)
  - Summer (DST): UTC+02:00 (CEST)
- INSEE/Postal code: 82056 /82160
- ^{1} French Land Register data, which excludes lakes, ponds, glaciers > 1 km^{2} (0.386 sq mi or 247 acres) and river estuaries.

Espinas is a commune in the Tarn-et-Garonne department in Occitanie, a region in southern France.

== See also ==
- Communes of the Tarn-et-Garonne department
