= Canton of Quercy-Rouergue =

Coordinates: 44.18°N 1.62°E

The canton of Quercy-Rouergue is an administrative division of the Tarn-et-Garonne department, in southern France. It was created at the French canton reorganisation which came into effect in March 2015. Its seat is in Septfonds.

It consists of the following communes:

1. Castanet
2. Caylus
3. Cayriech
4. Cazals
5. Espinas
6. Féneyrols
7. Ginals
8. Labastide-de-Penne
9. Lacapelle-Livron
10. Laguépie
11. Lapenche
12. Lavaurette
13. Loze
14. Monteils
15. Mouillac
16. Parisot
17. Puylagarde
18. Puylaroque
19. Saint-Antonin-Noble-Val
20. Saint-Cirq
21. Saint-Georges
22. Saint-Projet
23. Septfonds
24. Varen
25. Verfeil
