= Puylaroque =

- Commune
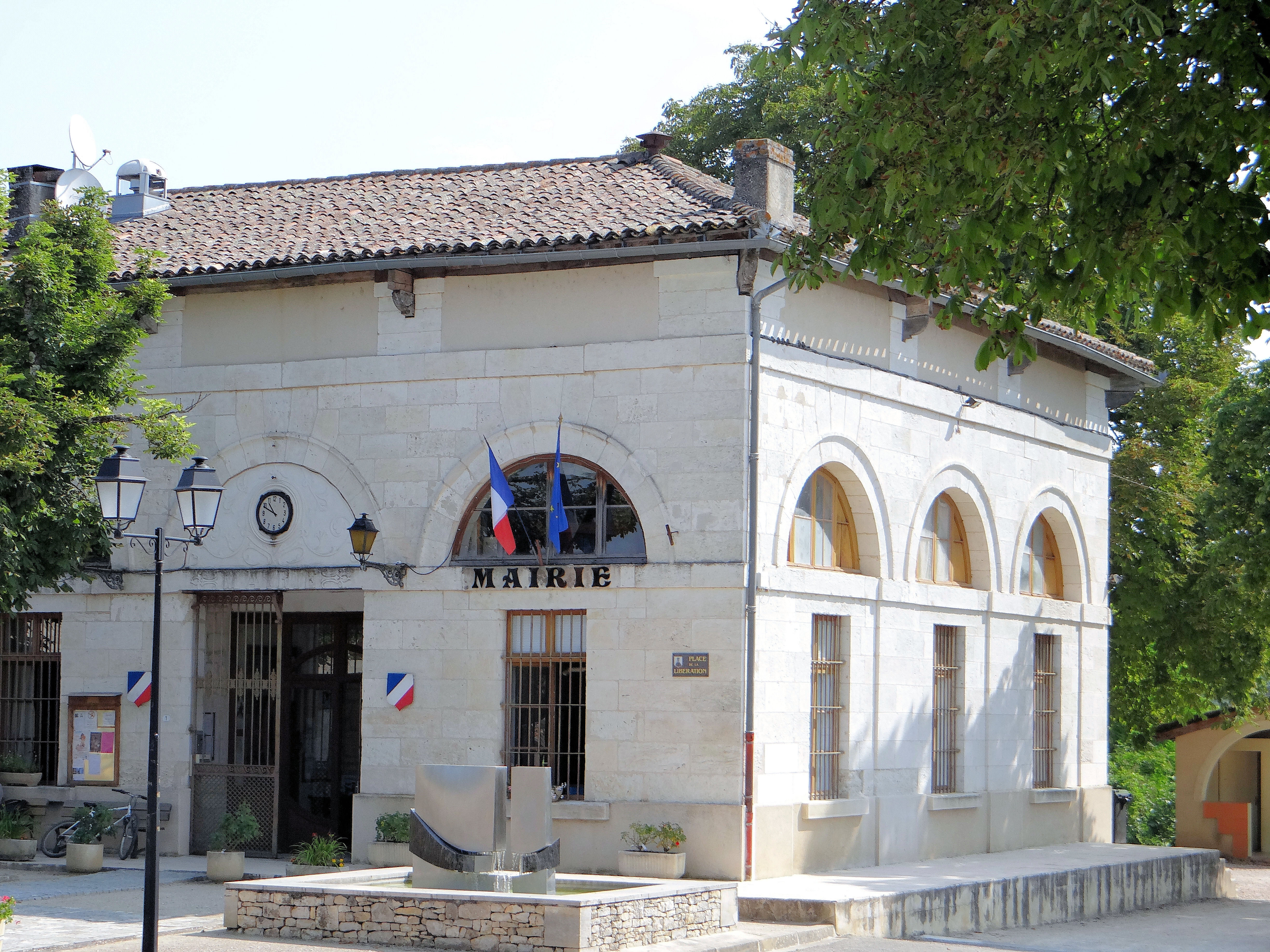
- The town hall of Puylaroque

- Coat of arms
- Location of Puylaroque
- Location within France Location within Occitanie
- Coordinates: 44°15′06″N 1°36′41″E
- Country: France
- Region: Occitania
- Department: Tarn-et-Garonne
- Arrondissement: Montauban
- Canton: Quercy-Rouergue
- Intercommunality: Quercy caussadais

Government
  - Mayor (2020–2026): Gilles Valette
- Area^{1}: 35.87 km^{2} (13.85 sq mi)
- Elevation: 230 m (750 ft)
- Highest elevation: 320 m (1,050 ft)
- Lowest elevation: 149 m (489 ft)
- Population (2023): 719
  - Density: 20.0/km^{2} (51.9/sq mi)
- Time zone: UTC+01:00 (CET)
  - Summer (DST): UTC+02:00 (CEST)
- INSEE/Postal code: 82148 /82240
- ^{1} French Land Register data, which excludes lakes, ponds, glaciers > 1 km^{2} (0.386 sq mi or 247 acres) and river estuaries.

Puylaroque (French pronunciation: [pɥilaʁɔk]; Occitan: Puèg la Ròca) is a commune in the Tarn-et-Garonne department in the Occitanie region in southern France.

== See also ==
- Communes of the Tarn-et-Garonne department
