= Cantons of the Tarn-et-Garonne department =

The following is a list of the 15 cantons of the Tarn-et-Garonne department, in France, following the French canton reorganisation which came into effect in March 2015:

- Aveyron-Lère
- Beaumont-de-Lomagne
- Castelsarrasin
- Garonne-Lomagne-Brulhois
- Moissac
- Montauban-1
- Montauban-2
- Montauban-3
- Montech
- Pays de Serres Sud-Quercy
- Quercy-Aveyron
- Quercy-Rouergue
- Tarn-Tescou-Quercy vert
- Valence
- Verdun-sur-Garonne
