= Edmond Papinot =

French priest and missionary

Jacques Edmond-Joseph Papinot
- Born: 1860; Châlons-sur-Saône, France
- Died: 1942 (aged 81–82); Montbeton, France
- Occupations: Priest; Missionary
- Years active: 1886–1920

Jacques Edmond-Joseph Papinot (1860–1942) was a French Roman Catholic priest and missionary who was also known in Japan as Father Papino (パピノ神父, Papino-shinpu). He was an architect, academic, historian, editor, Japanologist.

Papinot is best known for creating an Historical and Geographical Dictionary of Japan which was first published in French in 1899. The work was published in English in 1906.

== Early life ==
Papinot was born in 1860 in Châlons-sur-Saône in France.

He was ordained as a Catholic priest in September 1886, and three months later, he was sent to Japan.

== Career ==
Papinot first arrived in Japan in 1886. He taught at the Tokyo Theological Seminary for 15 years while working on his Dictionnaire japonais-français des noms principaux de l'histoire et de la géographie de Japon.

In 1911, he left Japan for China. He returned to France in 1920. He died in Montbeton in 1942.

== Selected works ==
In an overview of writings by and about Papinot, OCLC/WorldCat lists roughly 30+ works in 100+ publications in 7 languages and 1,200+ library holdings.

This list is not finished; you can help Wikipedia by adding to it.

- Dictionnaire japonais-français des noms principaux de l'histoire et de la géographie de Japon, 1899
- Historical and geographical dictionary of Japan, 1906
- Nihon seiei (Japanese hymns), 1922 (with Jean-Marie-Louis Lemaréchal)
