= Monbéqui =

- Commune
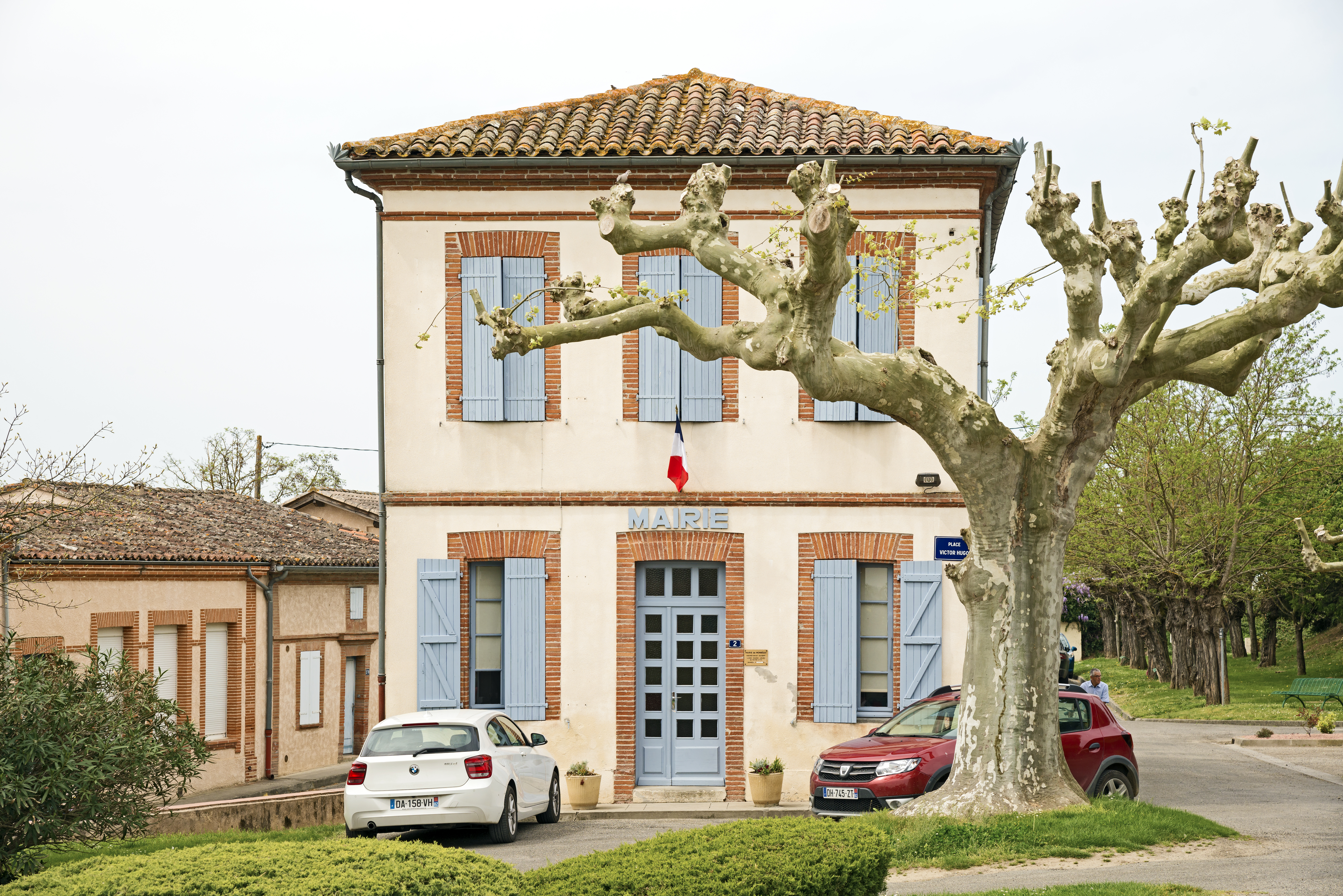

- Coat of arms
- Location of Monbéqui
- Location within France Location within Occitanie
- Coordinates: 43°53′37″N 1°14′26″E
- Country: France
- Region: Occitania
- Department: Tarn-et-Garonne
- Arrondissement: Montauban
- Canton: Montech
- Intercommunality: Grand Sud Tarn et Garonne

Government
  - Mayor (2020–2026): Alfred Marty
- Area^{1}: 6.78 km^{2} (2.62 sq mi)
- Elevation: 97 m (318 ft)
- Highest elevation: 104 m (341 ft)
- Lowest elevation: 88 m (289 ft)
- Population (2023): 665
  - Density: 98.1/km^{2} (254/sq mi)
- Time zone: UTC+01:00 (CET)
  - Summer (DST): UTC+02:00 (CEST)
- INSEE/Postal code: 82114 /82170
- ^{1} French Land Register data, which excludes lakes, ponds, glaciers > 1 km^{2} (0.386 sq mi or 247 acres) and river estuaries.

Monbéqui (French pronunciation: [mɔ̃beki]; Occitan: Montbequin) is a commune in the Tarn-et-Garonne department in the Occitanie region in southern France.

== Monuments ==
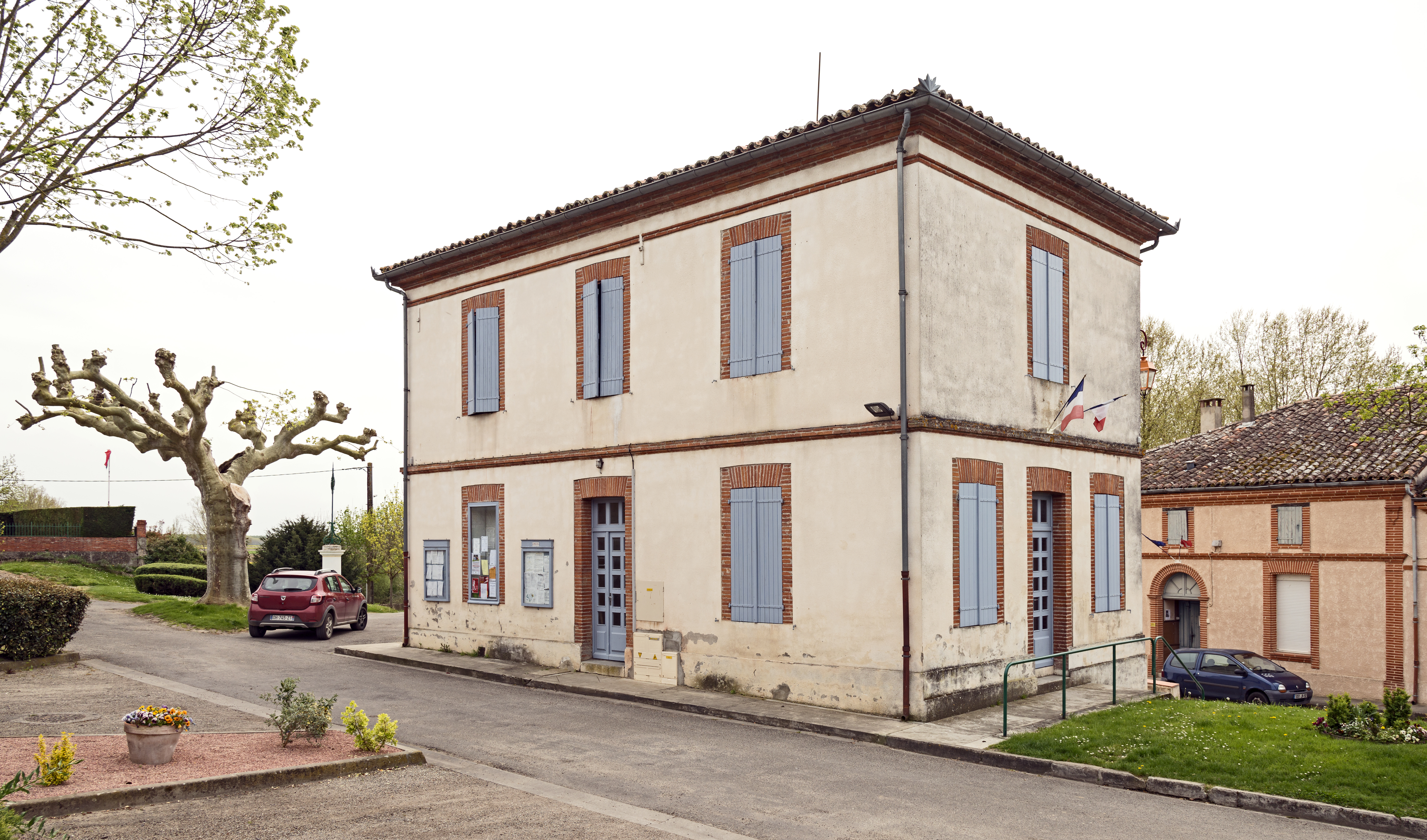
Town hall

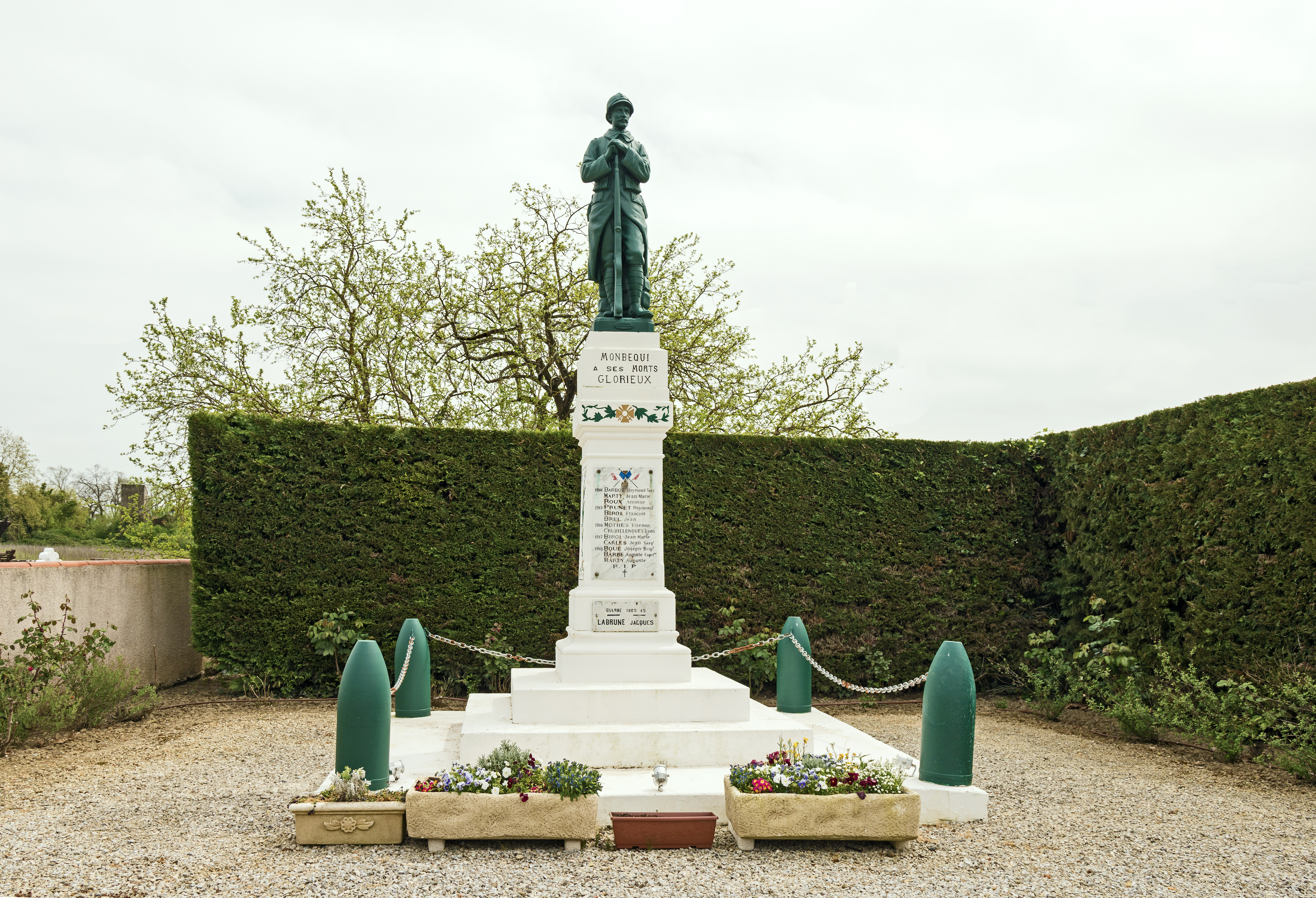
War monument

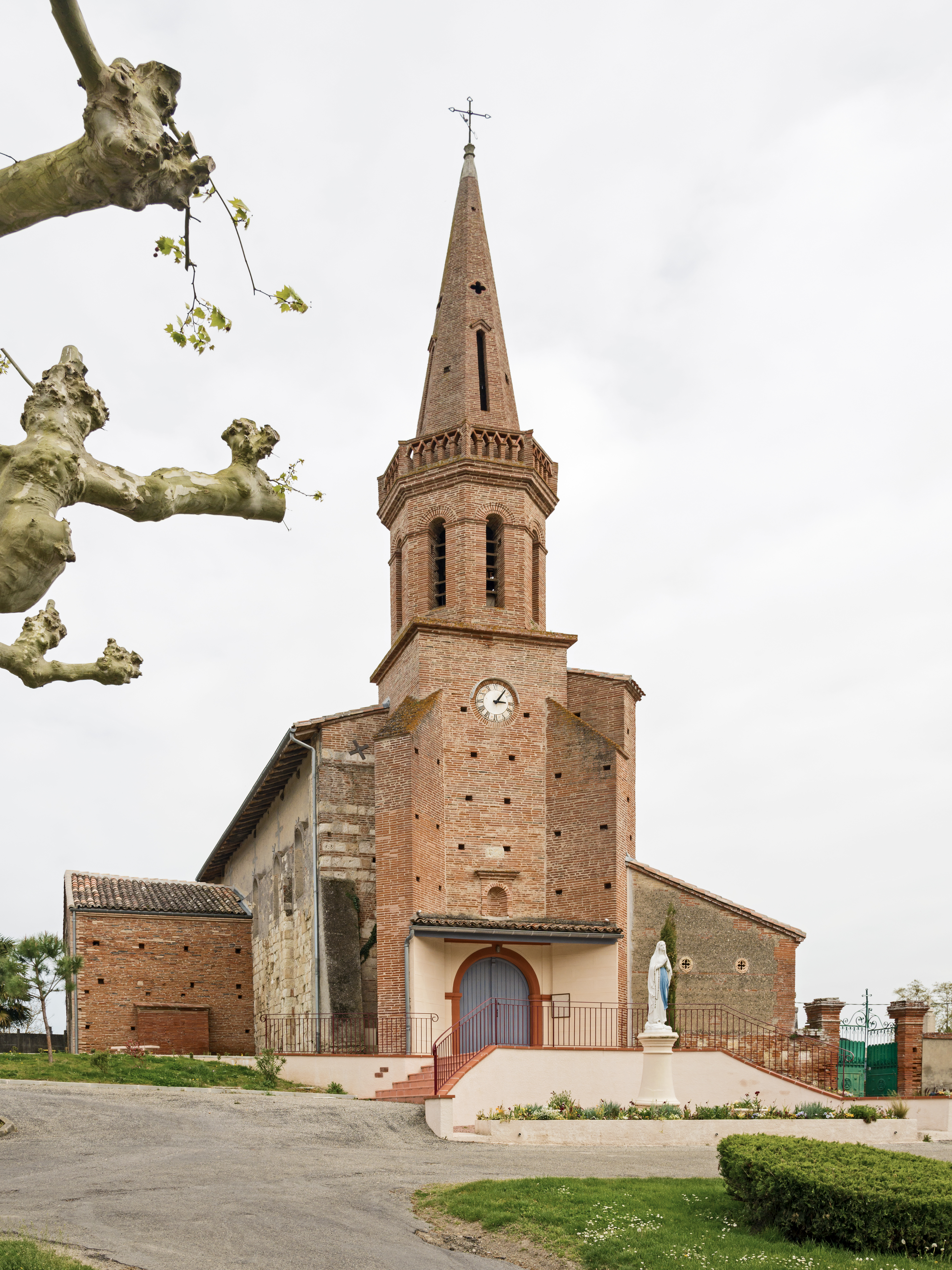
the church

== See also ==
- Communes of the Tarn-et-Garonne department
