= Escatalens =

- Commune
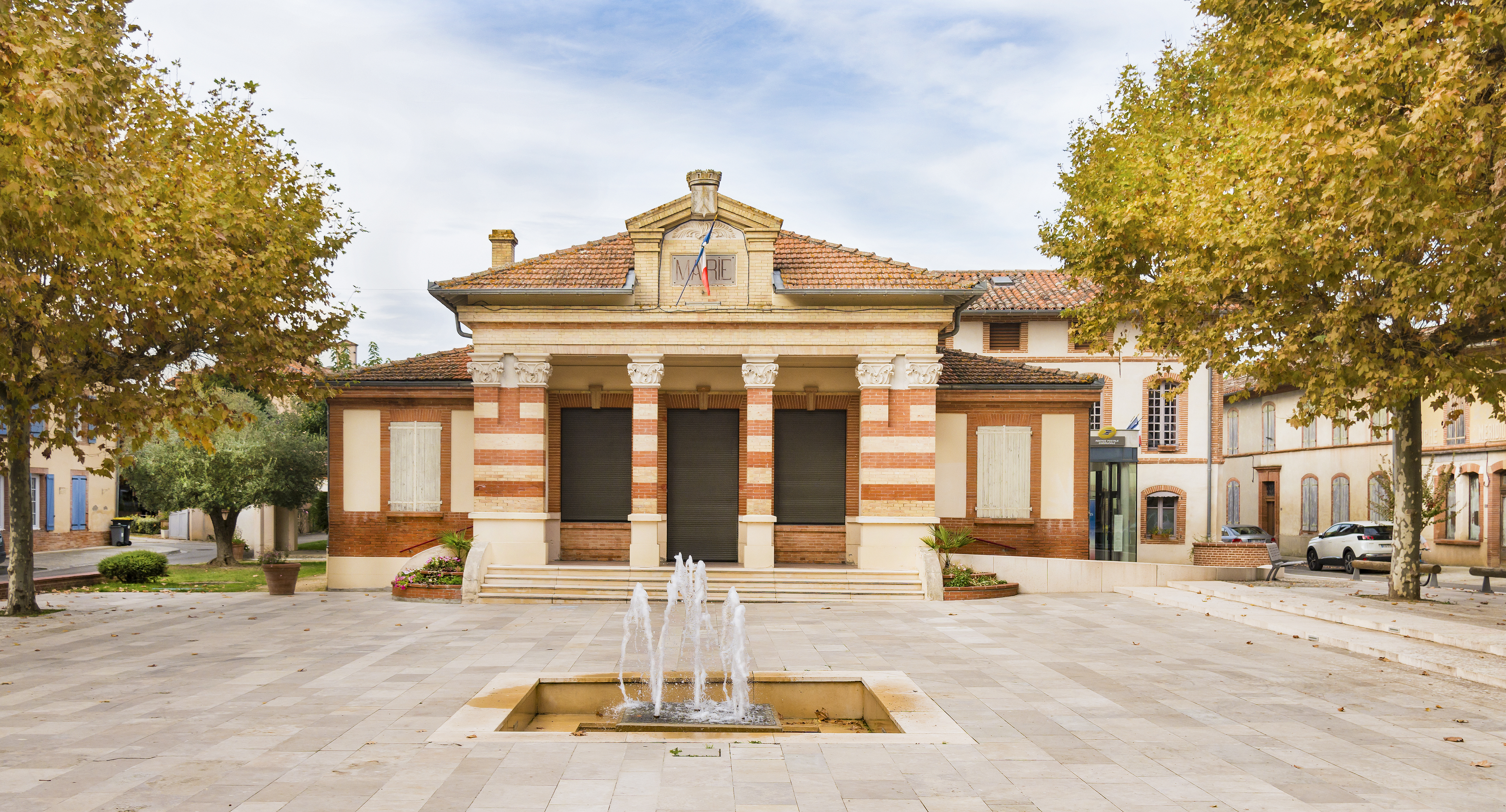

- Coat of arms
- Location of Escatalens
- Location within France Location within Occitanie
- Coordinates: 43°59′09″N 1°11′23″E
- Country: France
- Region: Occitania
- Department: Tarn-et-Garonne
- Arrondissement: Montauban
- Canton: Beaumont-de-Lomagne
- Intercommunality: CA Grand Montauban

Government
  - Mayor (2020–2026): Michel Cornille
- Area^{1}: 17.99 km^{2} (6.95 sq mi)
- Elevation: 88 m (289 ft)
- Highest elevation: 101 m (331 ft)
- Lowest elevation: 75 m (246 ft)
- Population (2023): 1,148
  - Density: 63.81/km^{2} (165.3/sq mi)
- Time zone: UTC+01:00 (CET)
  - Summer (DST): UTC+02:00 (CEST)
- INSEE/Postal code: 82052 /82700
- ^{1} French Land Register data, which excludes lakes, ponds, glaciers > 1 km^{2} (0.386 sq mi or 247 acres) and river estuaries.

Escatalens is a commune in the Tarn-et-Garonne department in the Occitanie region in southern France.

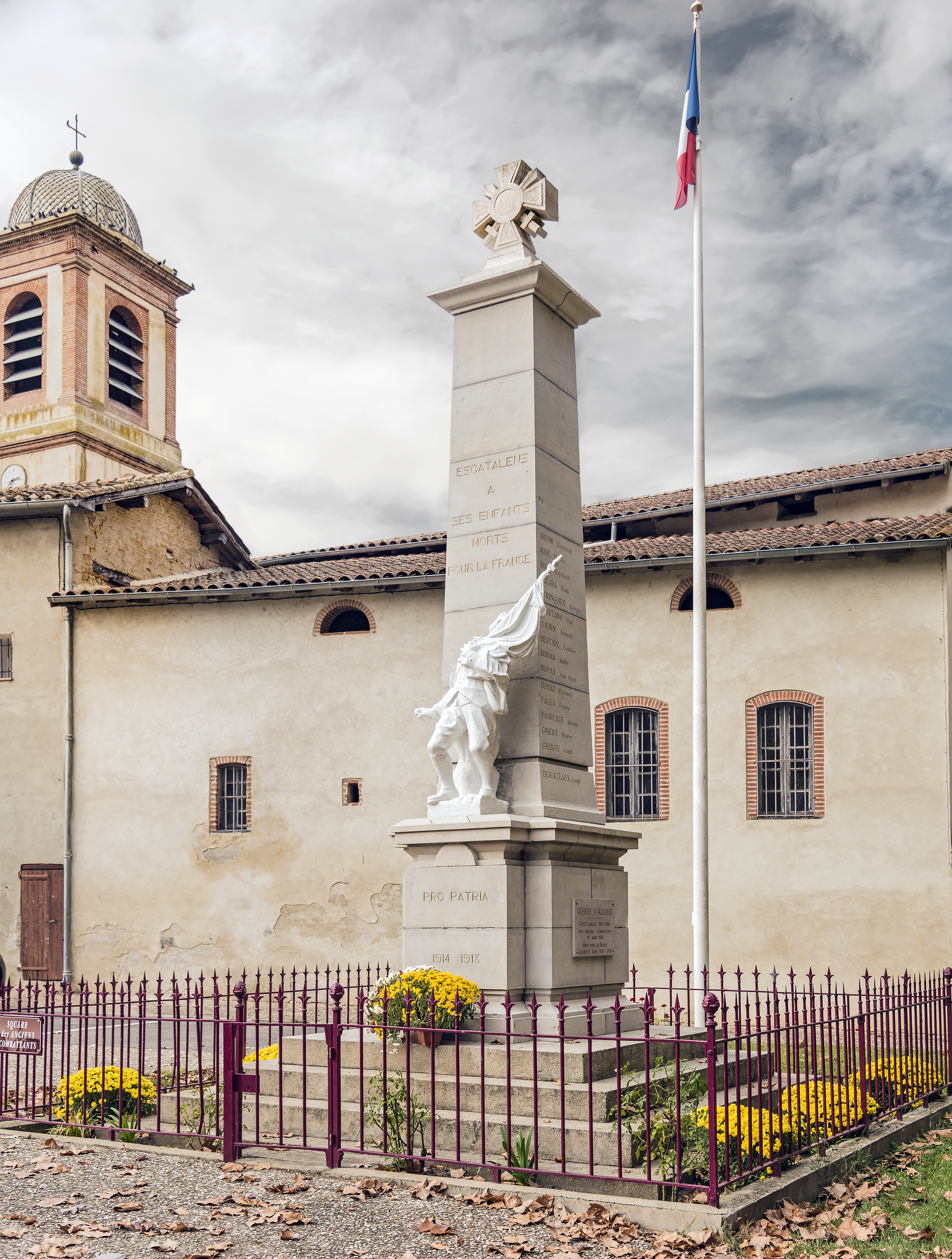
The war memorial

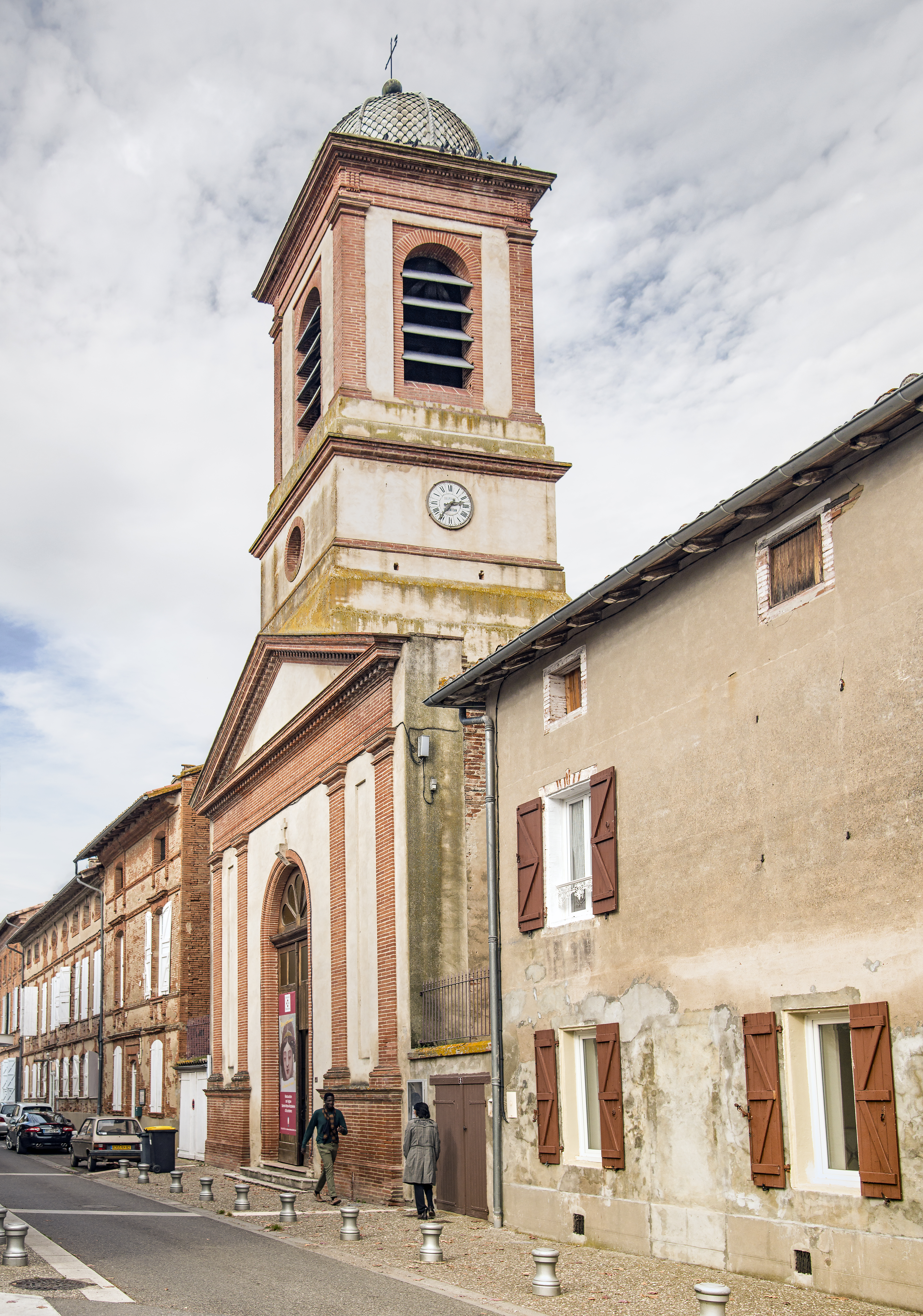
The church

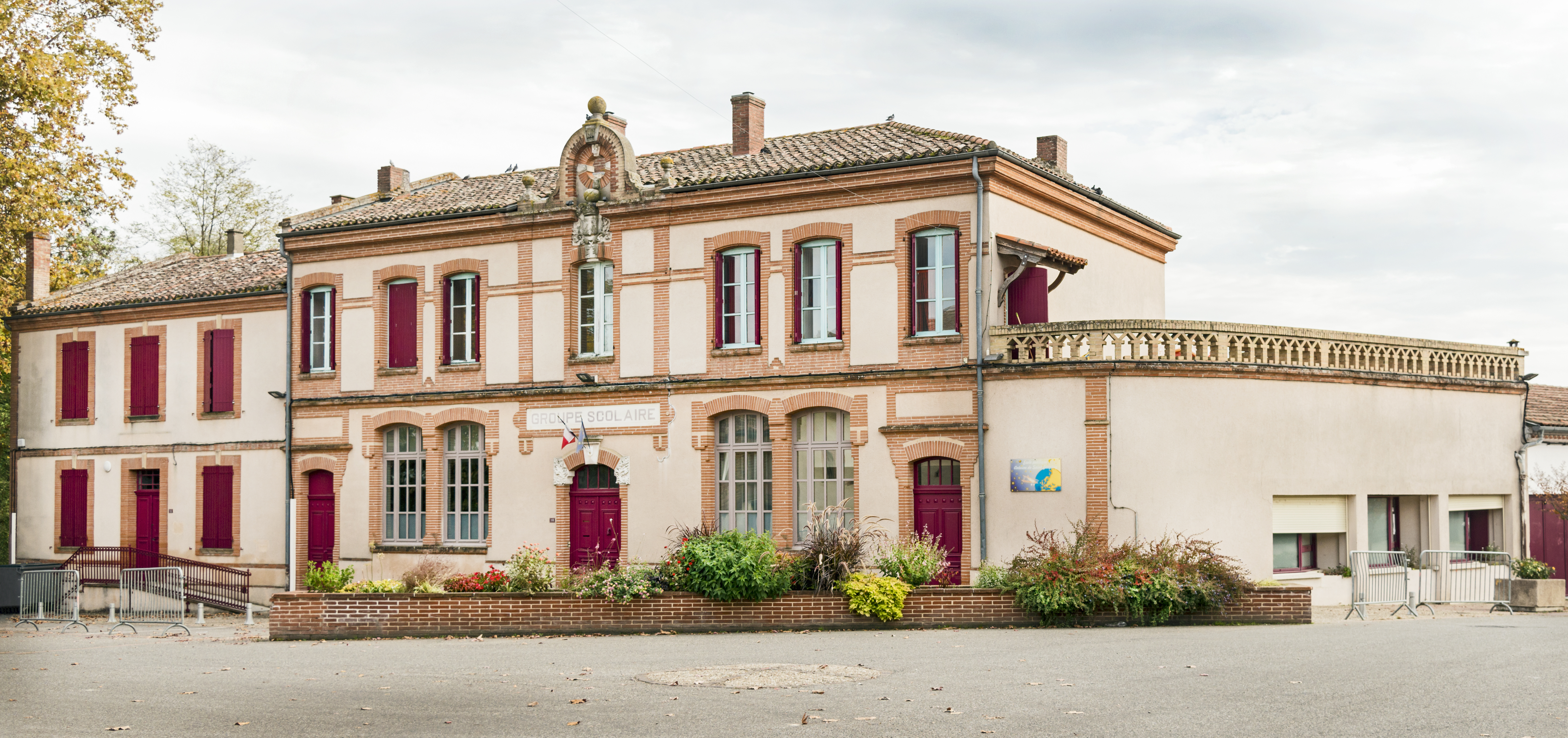
The school 'Antoine de Saint-Exupéry'

== See also ==
- Communes of the Tarn-et-Garonne department
