= Saint-Nauphary =

- Commune
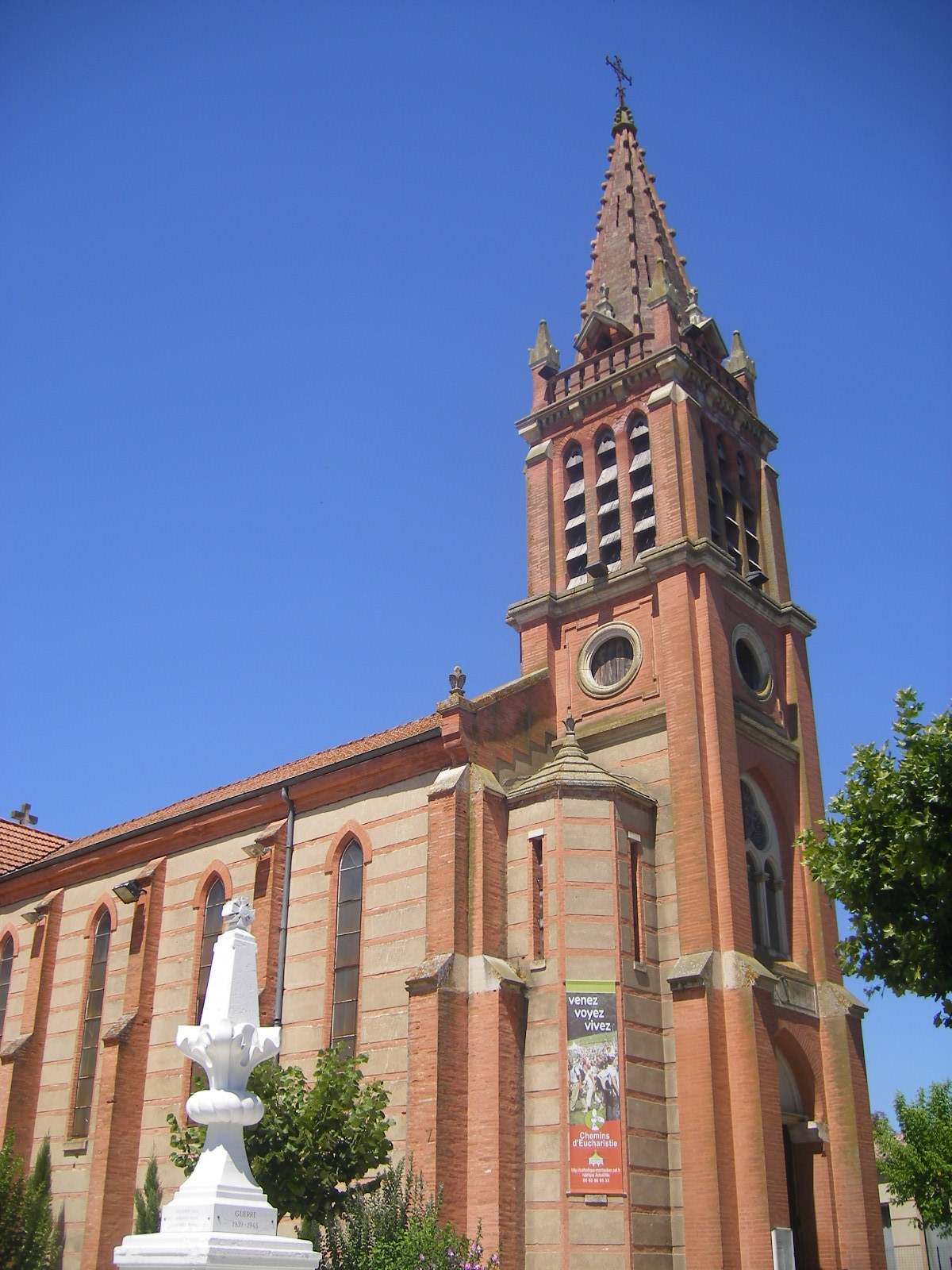
- The church in Saint-Nauphary

- Coat of arms
- Location of Saint-Nauphary
- Location within France Location within Occitanie
- Coordinates: 43°57′56″N 1°25′45″E
- Country: France
- Region: Occitania
- Department: Tarn-et-Garonne
- Arrondissement: Montauban
- Canton: Tarn-Tescou-Quercy vert
- Intercommunality: CA Grand Montauban

Government
  - Mayor (2020–2026): Bernard Paillares
- Area^{1}: 24.43 km^{2} (9.43 sq mi)
- Elevation: 125 m (410 ft)
- Highest elevation: 222 m (728 ft)
- Lowest elevation: 90 m (300 ft)
- Population (2023): 1,948
  - Density: 79.74/km^{2} (206.5/sq mi)
- Time zone: UTC+01:00 (CET)
  - Summer (DST): UTC+02:00 (CEST)
- INSEE/Postal code: 82167 /82370
- ^{1} French Land Register data, which excludes lakes, ponds, glaciers > 1 km^{2} (0.386 sq mi or 247 acres) and river estuaries.

Saint-Nauphary (French pronunciation: [sɛ̃ nofaʁi]; Occitan: Sent Naufari) is a commune in the Tarn-et-Garonne department in the Occitanie region in southern France.

== See also ==
- Communes of the Tarn-et-Garonne department
