= Albefeuille-Lagarde =

- Commune
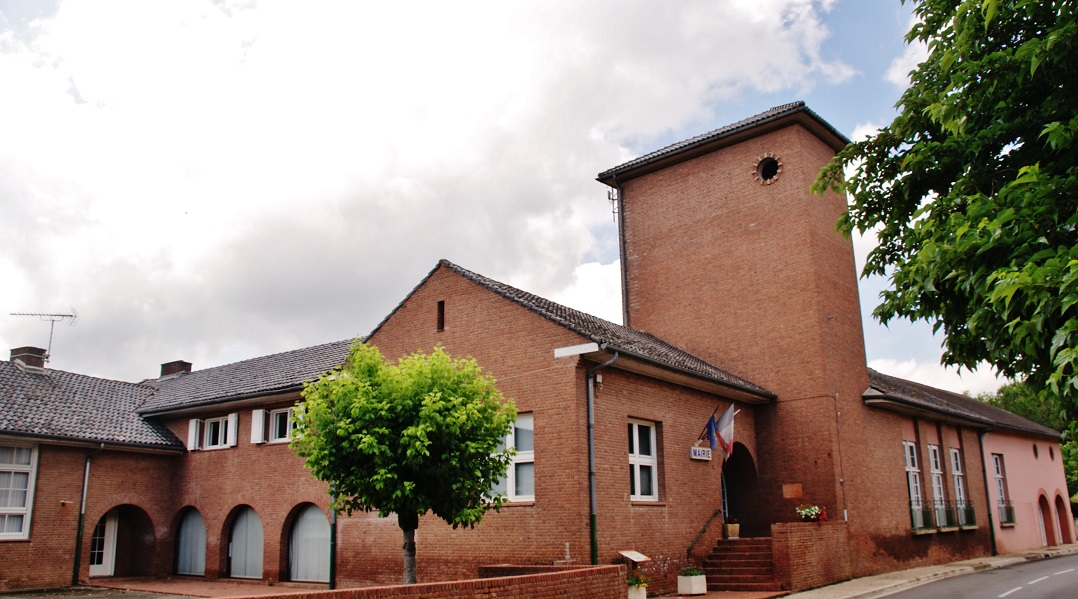

- Coat of arms
- Location of Albefeuille-Lagarde
- Location within France Location within Occitanie
- Coordinates: 44°04′02″N 1°16′42″E
- Country: France
- Region: Occitania
- Department: Tarn-et-Garonne
- Arrondissement: Castelsarrasin
- Canton: Montech
- Intercommunality: CA Grand Montauban

Government
  - Mayor (2020–2026): Francis Massimino
- Area^{1}: 8.03 km^{2} (3.10 sq mi)
- Elevation: 125 m (410 ft)
- Highest elevation: 102 m (335 ft)
- Lowest elevation: 73 m (240 ft)
- Population (2023): 582
  - Density: 72.5/km^{2} (188/sq mi)
- Time zone: UTC+01:00 (CET)
  - Summer (DST): UTC+02:00 (CEST)
- INSEE/Postal code: 82001 /82290
- ^{1} French Land Register data, which excludes lakes, ponds, glaciers > 1 km^{2} (0.386 sq mi or 247 acres) and river estuaries.

Albefeuille-Lagarde (French pronunciation: [albəfœj laɡaʁd]; Occitan: Albafuèlha e la Garda) is a commune in the Tarn-et-Garonne department in the Occitania region of southern France.

== Population ==
Historical population
Year	Pop.	±% p.a.
1968	549	—
1975	578	+0.74%
1982	601	+0.56%
1990	632	+0.63%
1999	644	+0.21%
2007	631	−0.25%
2012	612	−0.61%
2017	633	+0.68%
2023	582	−1.39%
Source: INSEE

== See also ==
- Communes of the Tarn-et-Garonne department
