= Lacourt-Saint-Pierre =

- Commune
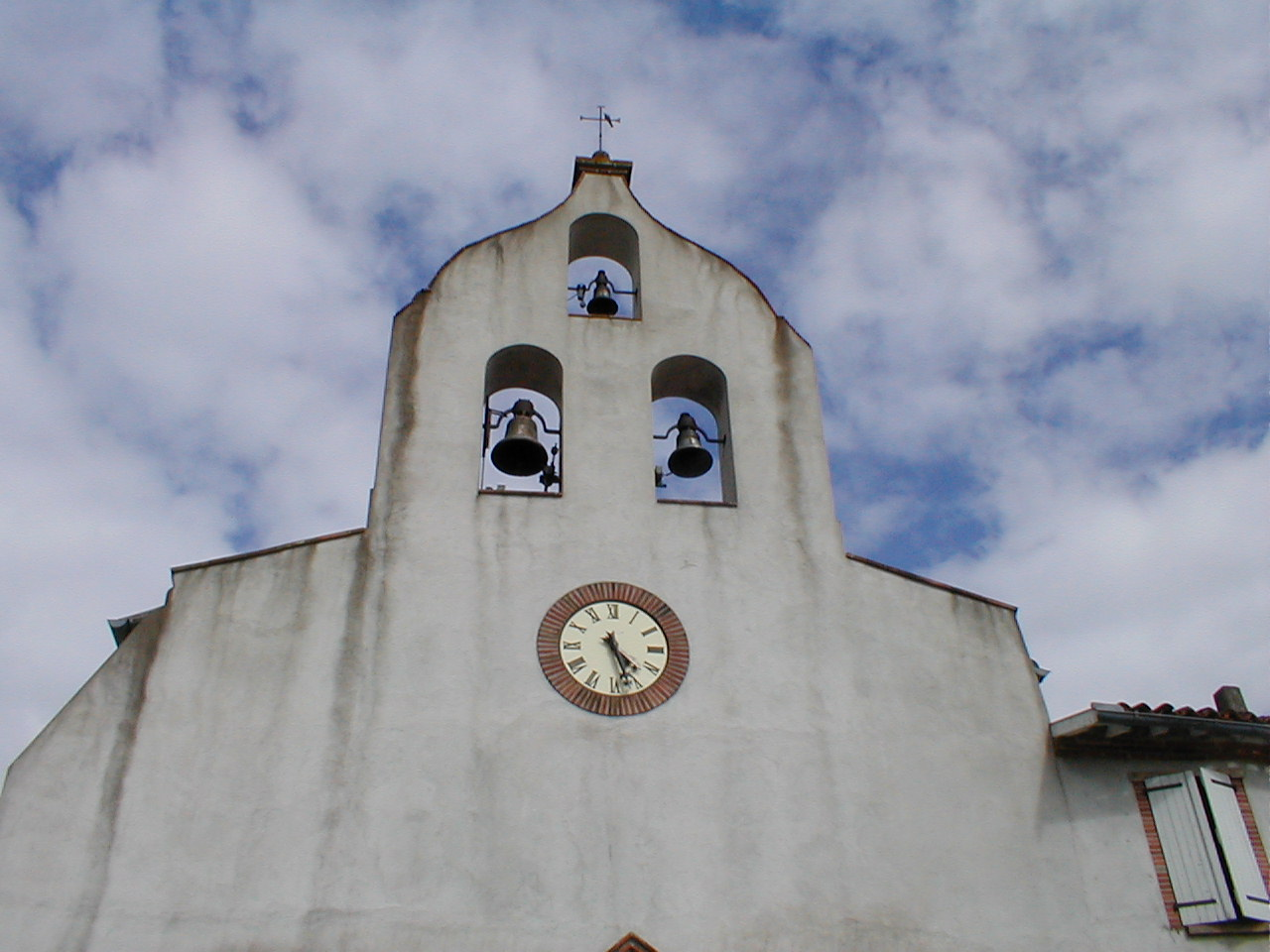
- The church in Lacourt-Saint-Pierre

- Coat of arms
- Location of Lacourt-Saint-Pierre
- Location within France Location within Occitanie
- Coordinates: 43°59′12″N 1°15′54″E
- Country: France
- Region: Occitania
- Department: Tarn-et-Garonne
- Arrondissement: Montauban
- Canton: Montech
- Intercommunality: CA Grand Montauban

Government
  - Mayor (2020–2026): Françoise Pizzini
- Area^{1}: 14.77 km^{2} (5.70 sq mi)
- Elevation: 163 m (535 ft)
- Highest elevation: 111 m (364 ft)
- Lowest elevation: 81 m (266 ft)
- Population (2023): 1,255
  - Density: 84.97/km^{2} (220.1/sq mi)
- Time zone: UTC+01:00 (CET)
  - Summer (DST): UTC+02:00 (CEST)
- INSEE/Postal code: 82085 /82290
- ^{1} French Land Register data, which excludes lakes, ponds, glaciers > 1 km^{2} (0.386 sq mi or 247 acres) and river estuaries.

Lacourt-Saint-Pierre (French pronunciation: [lakuʁ sɛ̃ pjɛʁ]; Occitan: La Cort de Sent Pèire) is a commune in the Tarn-et-Garonne department in the Occitanie region in southern France.

== See also ==
- Communes of the Tarn-et-Garonne department
