= Villemade =

- Commune
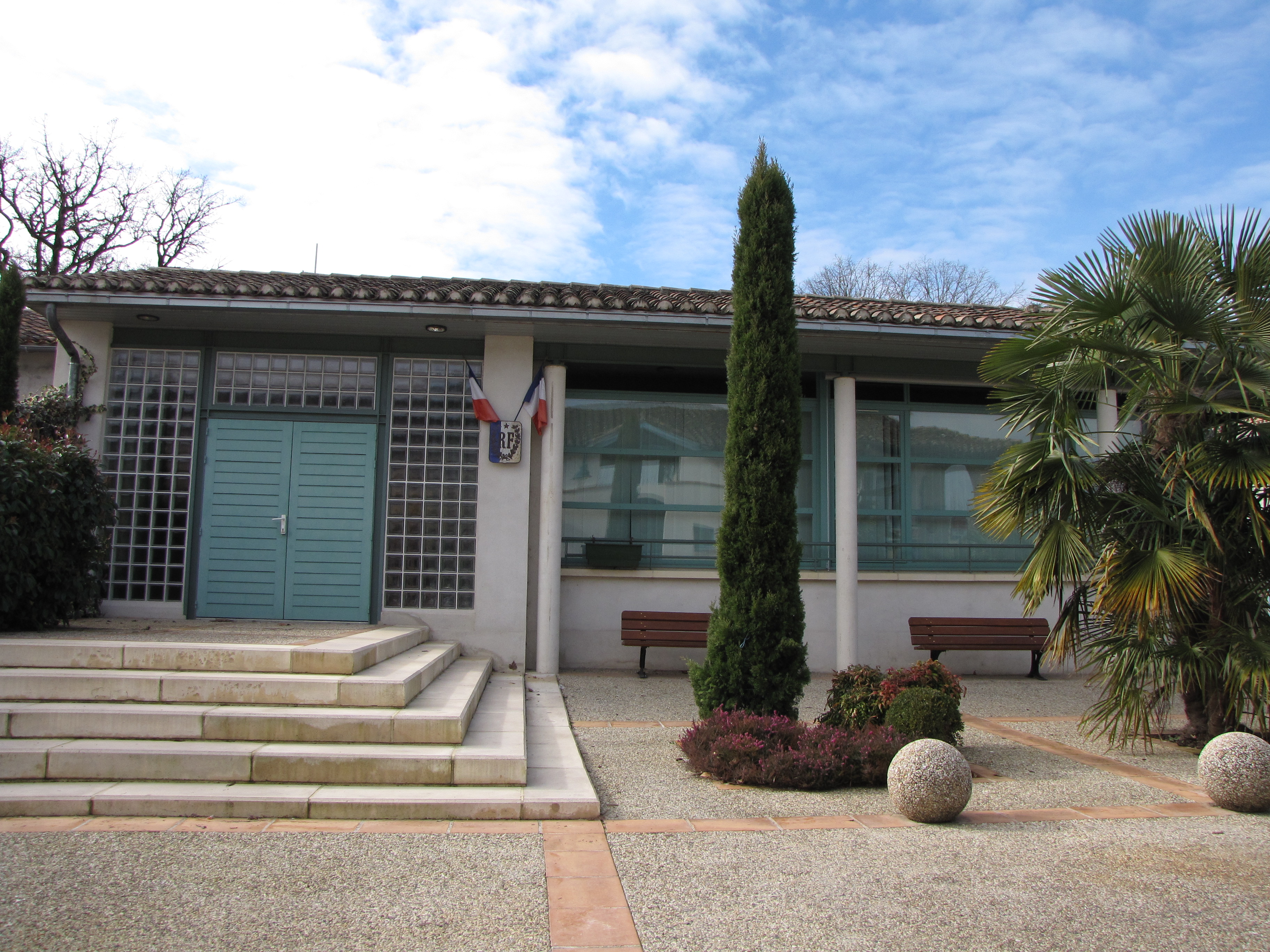
- The town hall of Villemade
- Location of Villemade
- Location within France Location within Occitanie
- Coordinates: 44°04′34″N 1°17′17″E
- Country: France
- Region: Occitania
- Department: Tarn-et-Garonne
- Arrondissement: Montauban
- Canton: Quercy-Aveyron
- Intercommunality: CA Grand Montauban

Government
  - Mayor (2020–2026): Francis Labruyere
- Area^{1}: 9.21 km^{2} (3.56 sq mi)
- Elevation: 79 m (259 ft)
- Highest elevation: 90 m (300 ft)
- Lowest elevation: 73 m (240 ft)
- Population (2023): 834
  - Density: 90.6/km^{2} (235/sq mi)
- Time zone: UTC+01:00 (CET)
  - Summer (DST): UTC+02:00 (CEST)
- INSEE/Postal code: 82195 /82130
- ^{1} French Land Register data, which excludes lakes, ponds, glaciers > 1 km^{2} (0.386 sq mi or 247 acres) and river estuaries.

Villemade (French pronunciation: [vilmad]; Occitan: Vilamada) is a commune in the Tarn-et-Garonne department in the Occitanie region in southern France.

== See also ==
- Communes of the Tarn-et-Garonne department
