= Lamothe-Capdeville =

- Commune
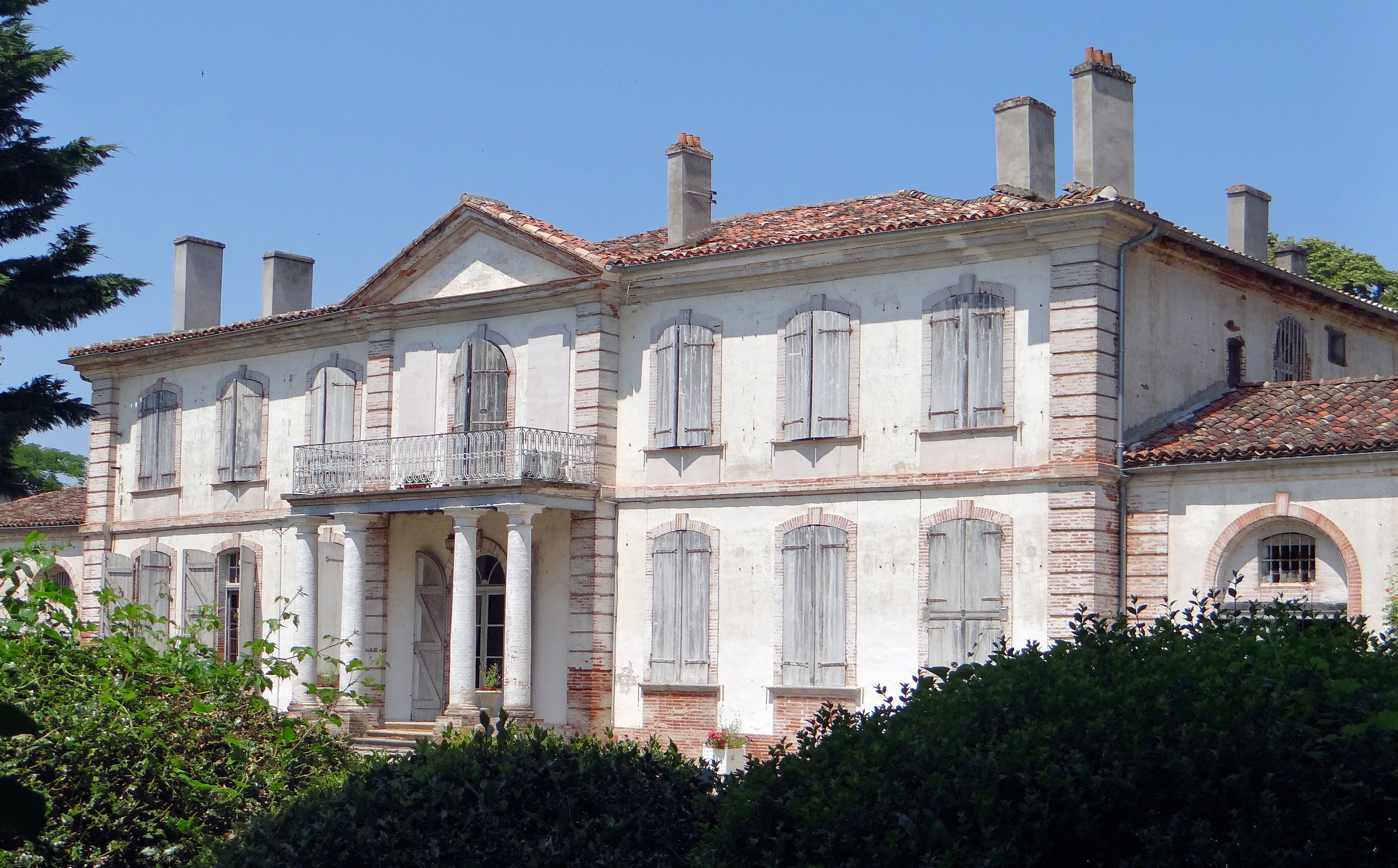
- The Château d'Ardus, in Lamothe-Capdeville

- Coat of arms
- Location of Lamothe-Capdeville
- Location within France Location within Occitanie
- Coordinates: 44°04′34″N 1°22′15″E
- Country: France
- Region: Occitania
- Department: Tarn-et-Garonne
- Arrondissement: Montauban
- Canton: Quercy-Aveyron
- Intercommunality: CA Grand Montauban

Government
  - Mayor (2020–2026): Alain Gabach
- Area^{1}: 11.92 km^{2} (4.60 sq mi)
- Elevation: 73 m (240 ft)
- Highest elevation: 205 m (673 ft)
- Lowest elevation: 73 m (240 ft)
- Population (2023): 1,068
  - Density: 89.60/km^{2} (232.1/sq mi)
- Time zone: UTC+01:00 (CET)
  - Summer (DST): UTC+02:00 (CEST)
- INSEE/Postal code: 82090 /82130
- ^{1} French Land Register data, which excludes lakes, ponds, glaciers > 1 km^{2} (0.386 sq mi or 247 acres) and river estuaries.

Lamothe-Capdeville (French pronunciation: [lamɔt kapdəvil]; Occitan: La Mòta e Capdevila) is a commune in the Tarn-et-Garonne department in the Occitanie region in southern France.

== See also ==
- Communes of the Tarn-et-Garonne department
