= Communauté d'agglomération Grand Montauban =

Grand Montauban
- Communauté d'agglomération
- Interactive map of Grand Montauban
- Coordinates: 44°01′N 01°21′E
- Country: France
- Region: Occitania
- Department: Tarn-et-Garonne
- No. of communes: 12
- Established: 1999
- Area: 293.0 km^{2} (113.1 sq mi)
- Population (2019): 78,505
  - Density: 267.9/km^{2} (693.9/sq mi)
- Website: grandmontauban.com

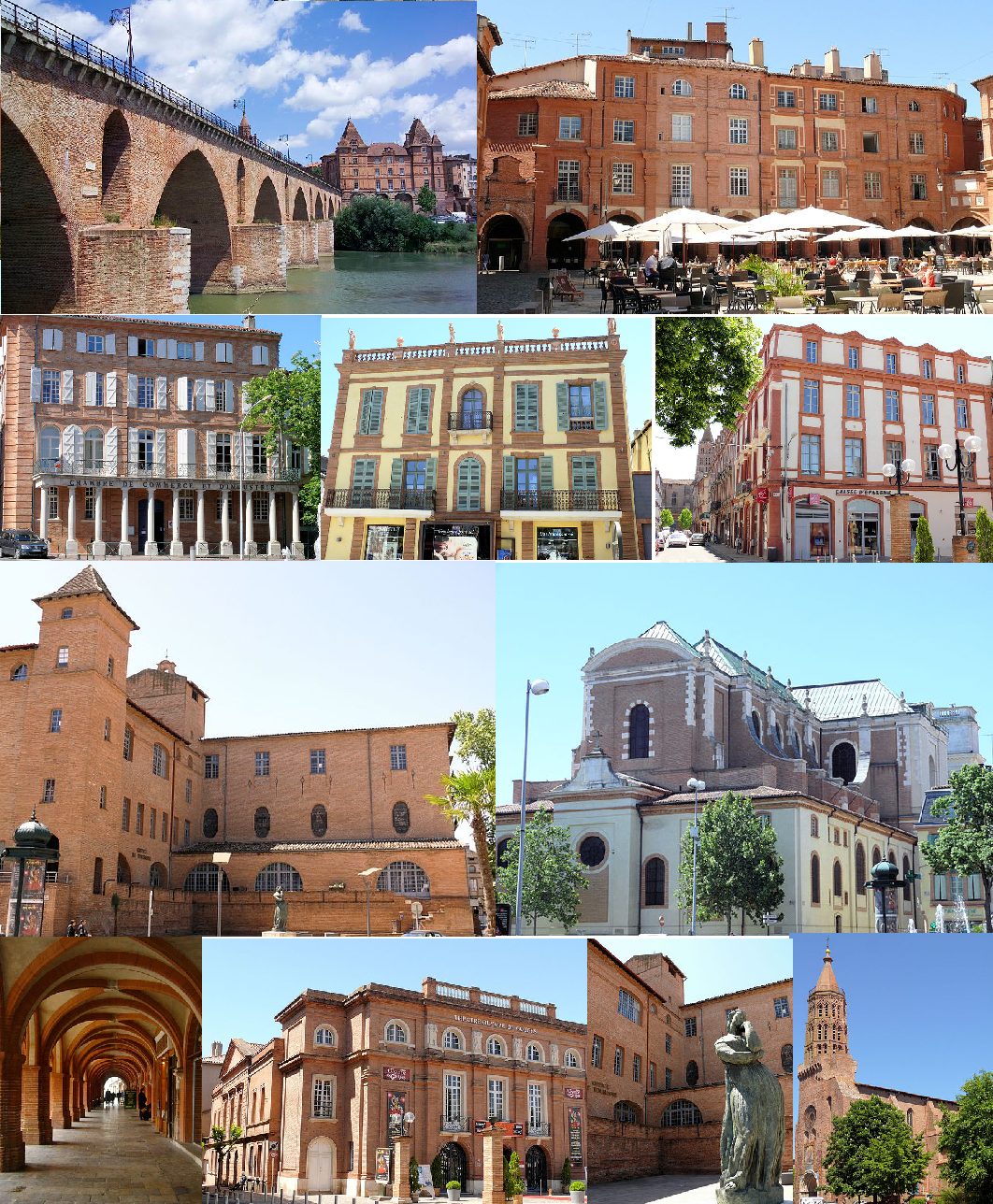
City of Montauban

Communauté d'agglomération Grand Montauban is the communauté d'agglomération, an intercommunal structure, centred on the city of Montauban. It is located in the Tarn-et-Garonne department, in the Occitania region, southern France. Created in 1999, its seat is in Montauban. Its area is 293.0 km^{2}. Its population was 78,505 in 2019, of which 61,372 in Montauban proper.

== Composition ==
The communauté d'agglomération consists of the following 12 communes:

1. Albefeuille-Lagarde
2. Bressols
3. Corbarieu
4. Escatalens
5. Lacourt-Saint-Pierre
6. Lamothe-Capdeville
7. Léojac
8. Montauban
9. Montbeton
10. Reyniès
11. Saint-Nauphary
12. Villemade
