= Finhan =

- Commune
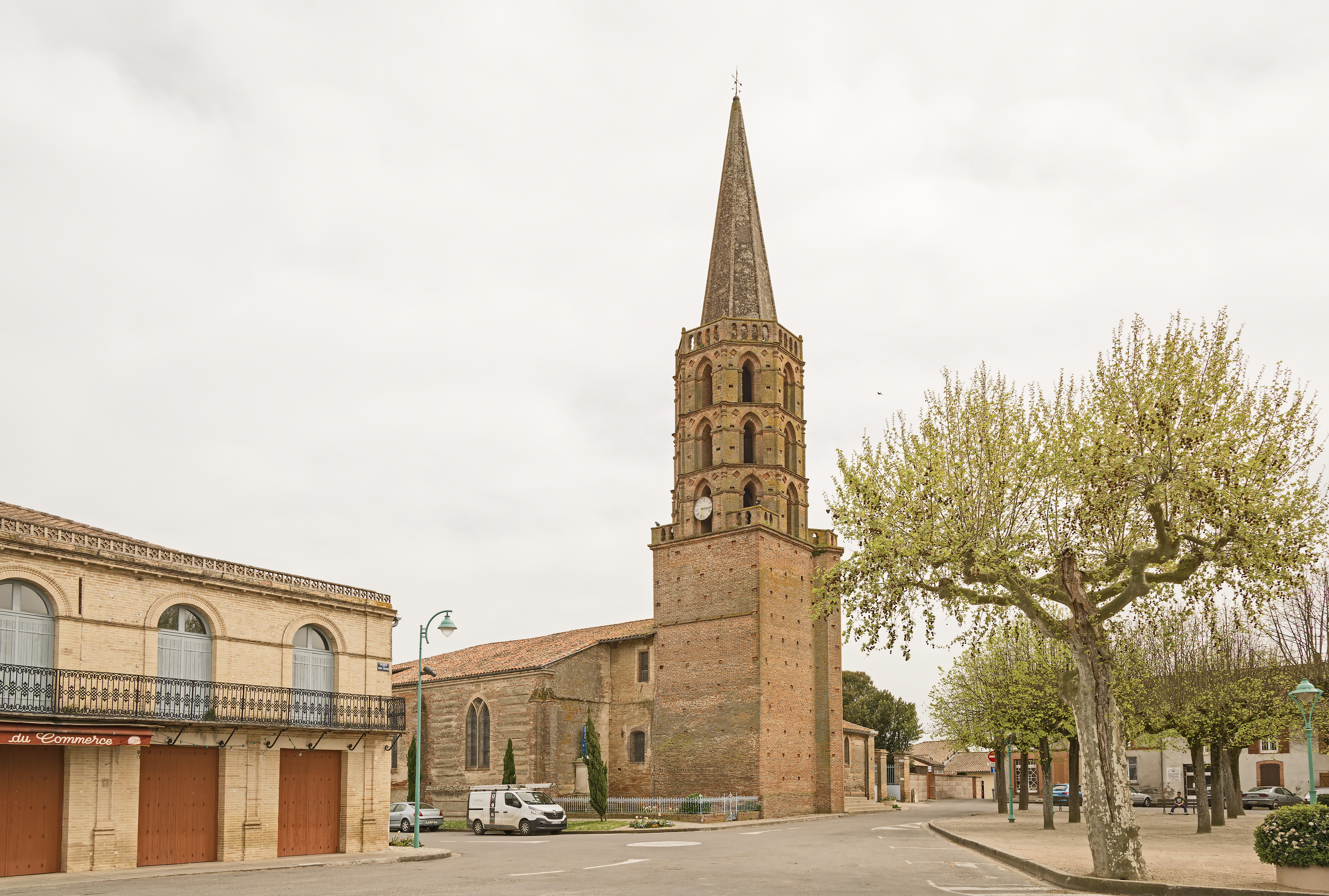
- The church of Saint-Martin, in Finhan

- Coat of arms
- Location of Finhan
- Location within France Location within Occitanie
- Coordinates: 43°54′48″N 1°13′17″E
- Country: France
- Region: Occitania
- Department: Tarn-et-Garonne
- Arrondissement: Montauban
- Canton: Montech

Government
  - Mayor (2023–2026): Christiane Rey
- Area^{1}: 11.48 km^{2} (4.43 sq mi)
- Elevation: 98 m (322 ft)
- Highest elevation: 104 m (341 ft)
- Lowest elevation: 83 m (272 ft)
- Population (2023): 1,471
  - Density: 128.1/km^{2} (331.9/sq mi)
- Time zone: UTC+01:00 (CET)
  - Summer (DST): UTC+02:00 (CEST)
- INSEE/Postal code: 82062 /82700
- ^{1} French Land Register data, which excludes lakes, ponds, glaciers > 1 km^{2} (0.386 sq mi or 247 acres) and river estuaries.

Finhan (French pronunciation: [fiɲɑ̃]) is a commune in the Tarn-et-Garonne department in the Occitanie region in southern France.

== Monuments ==
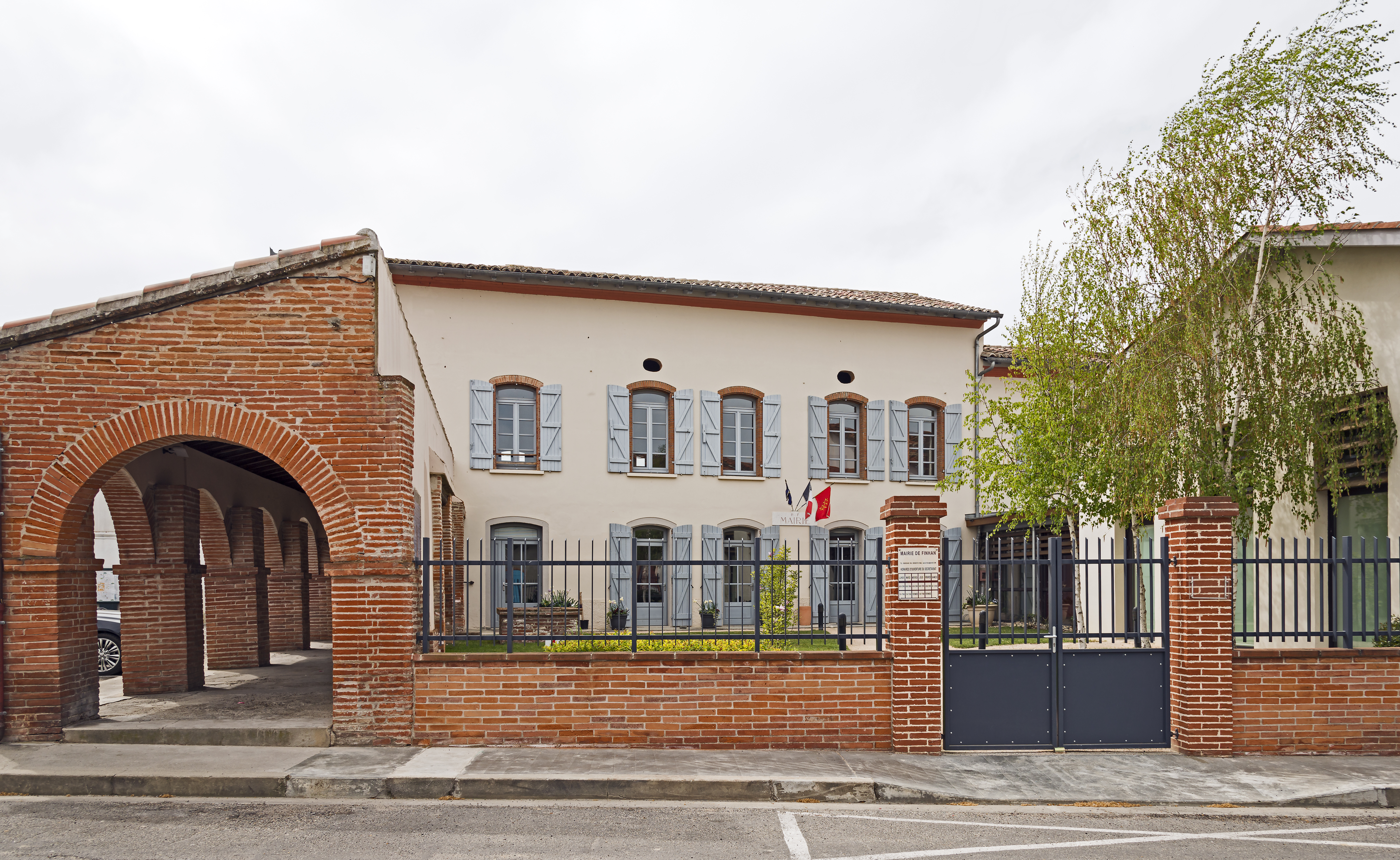
the town hall

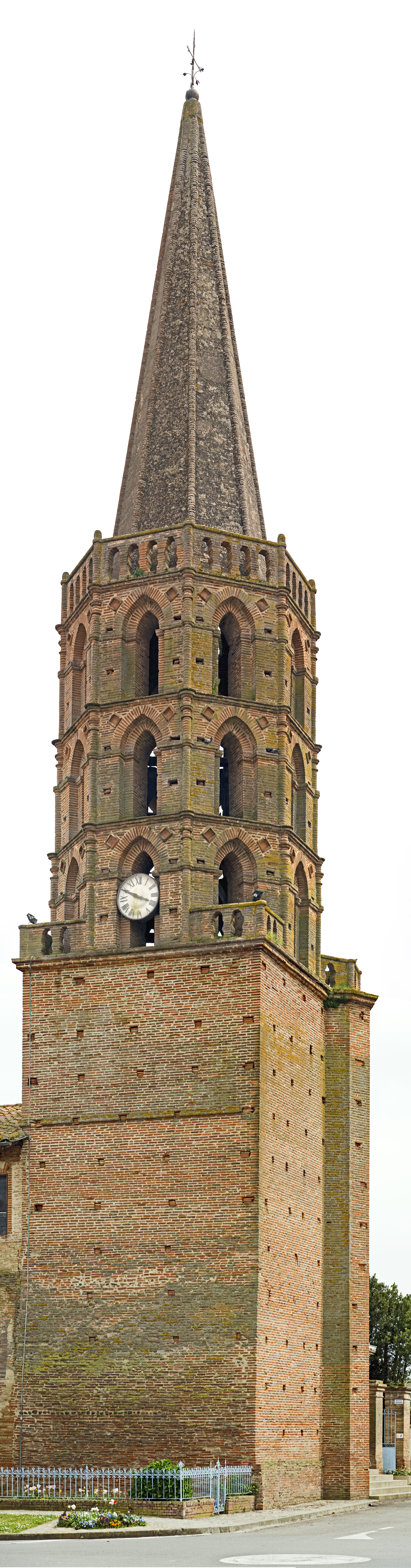
Bell tower

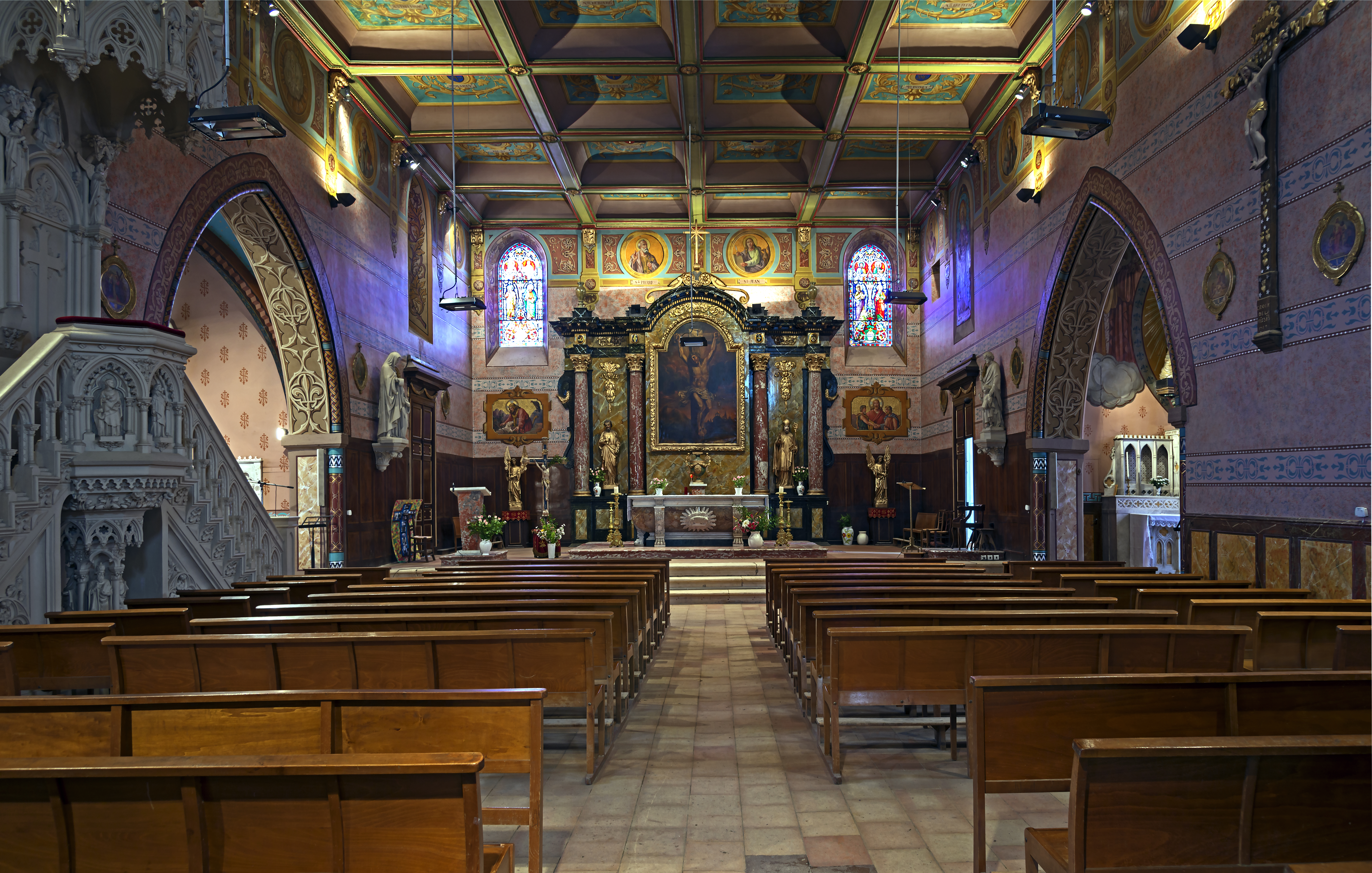
Inside the church

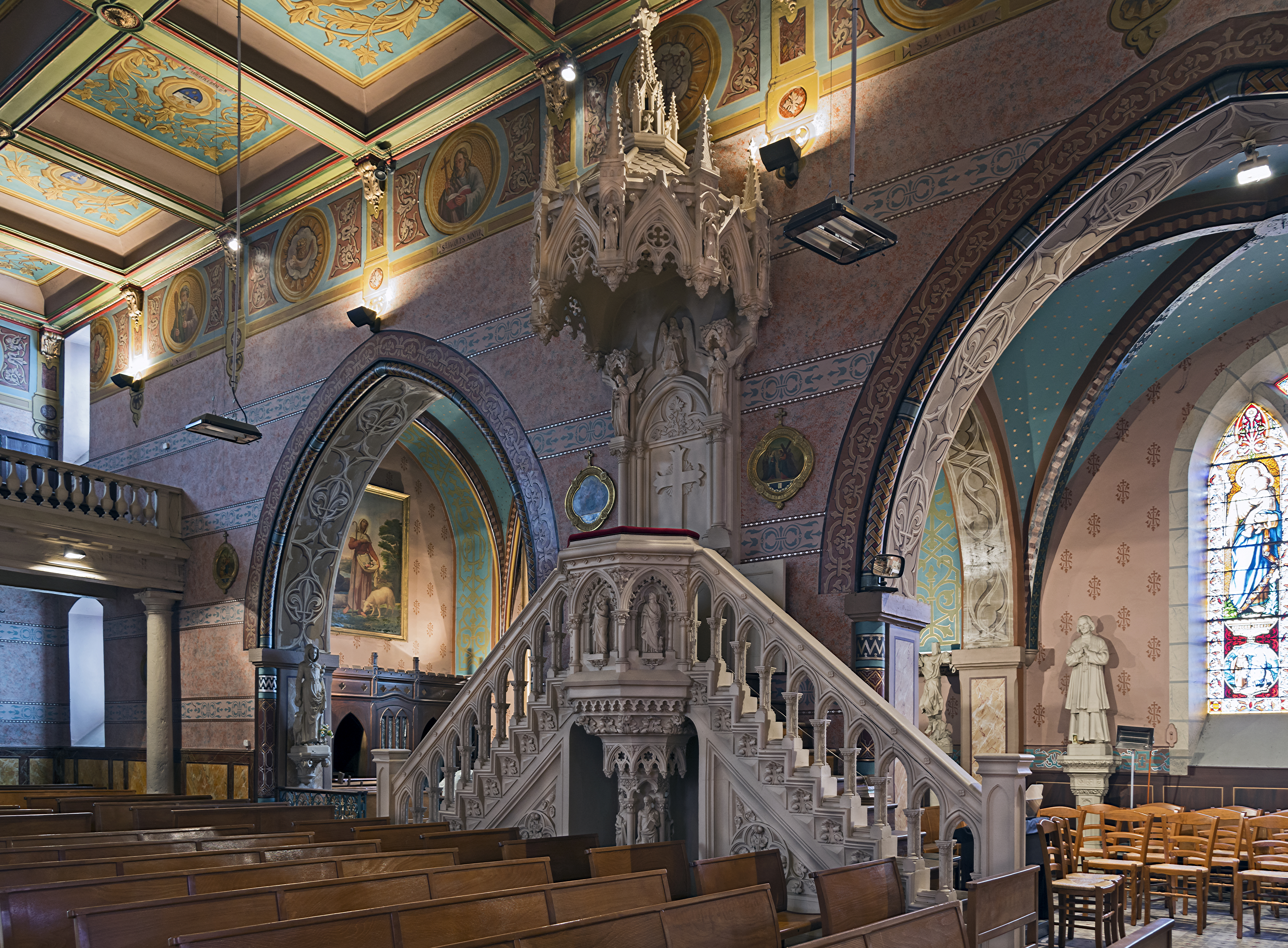
Pulpit

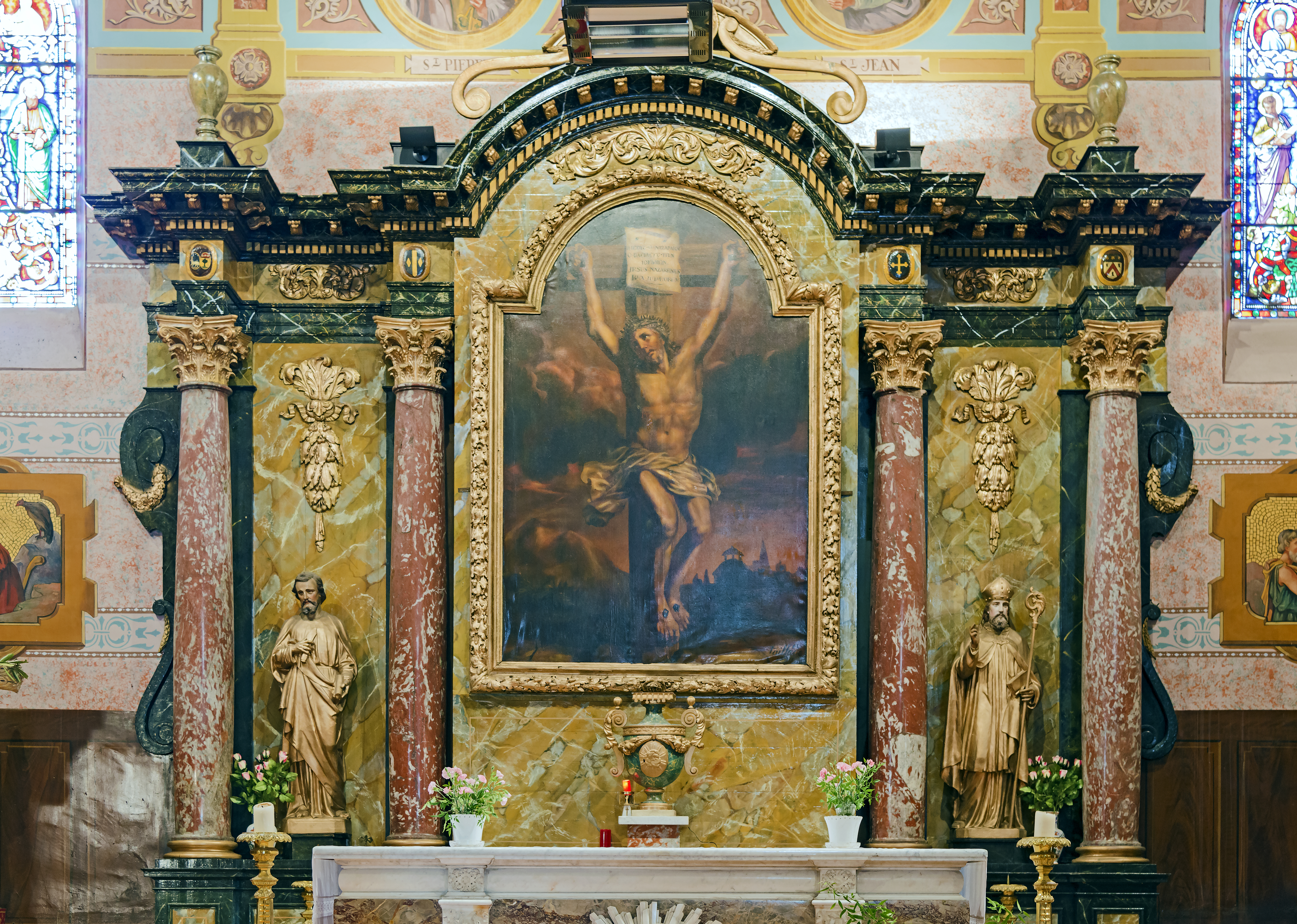
Altarpiece

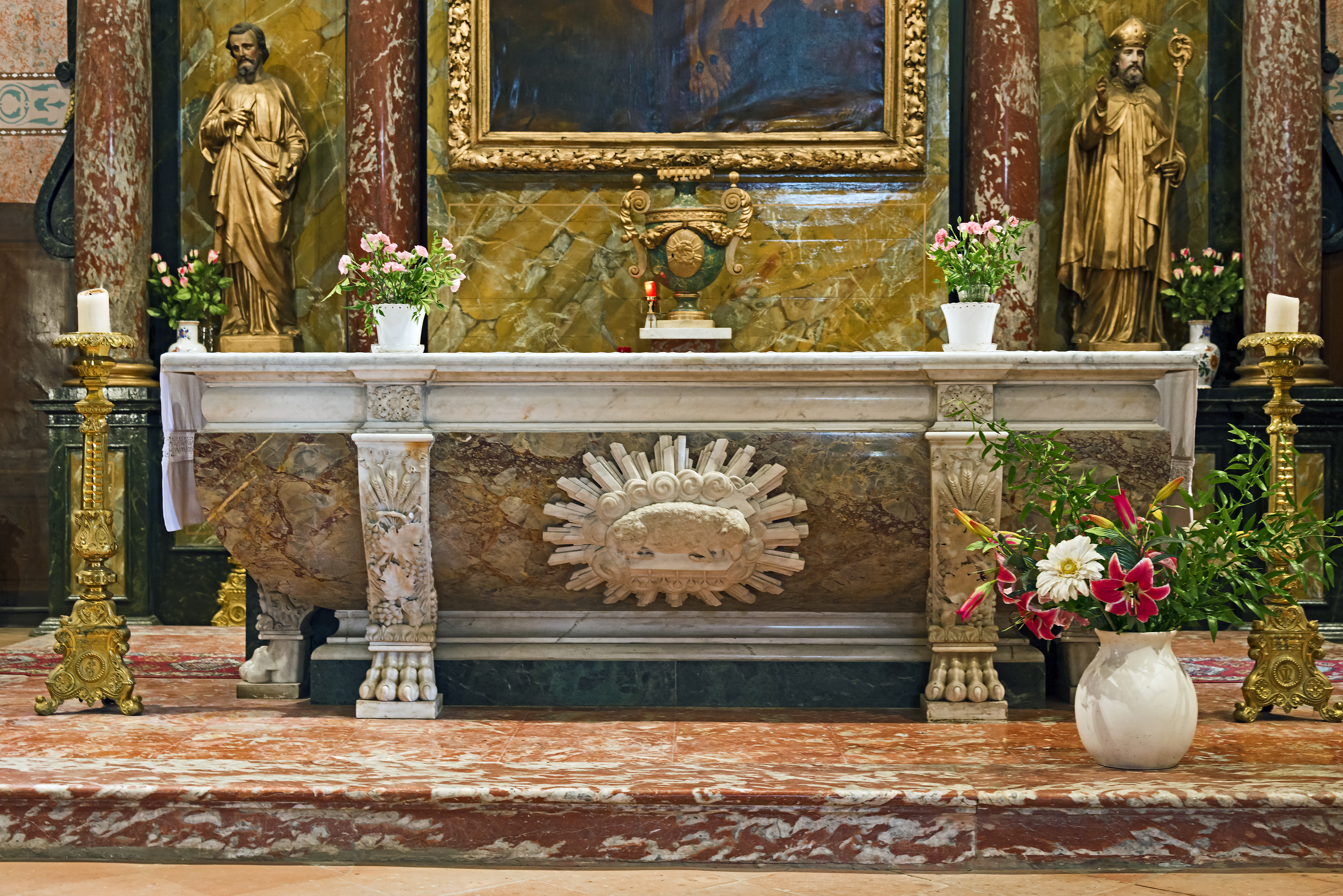
Altar

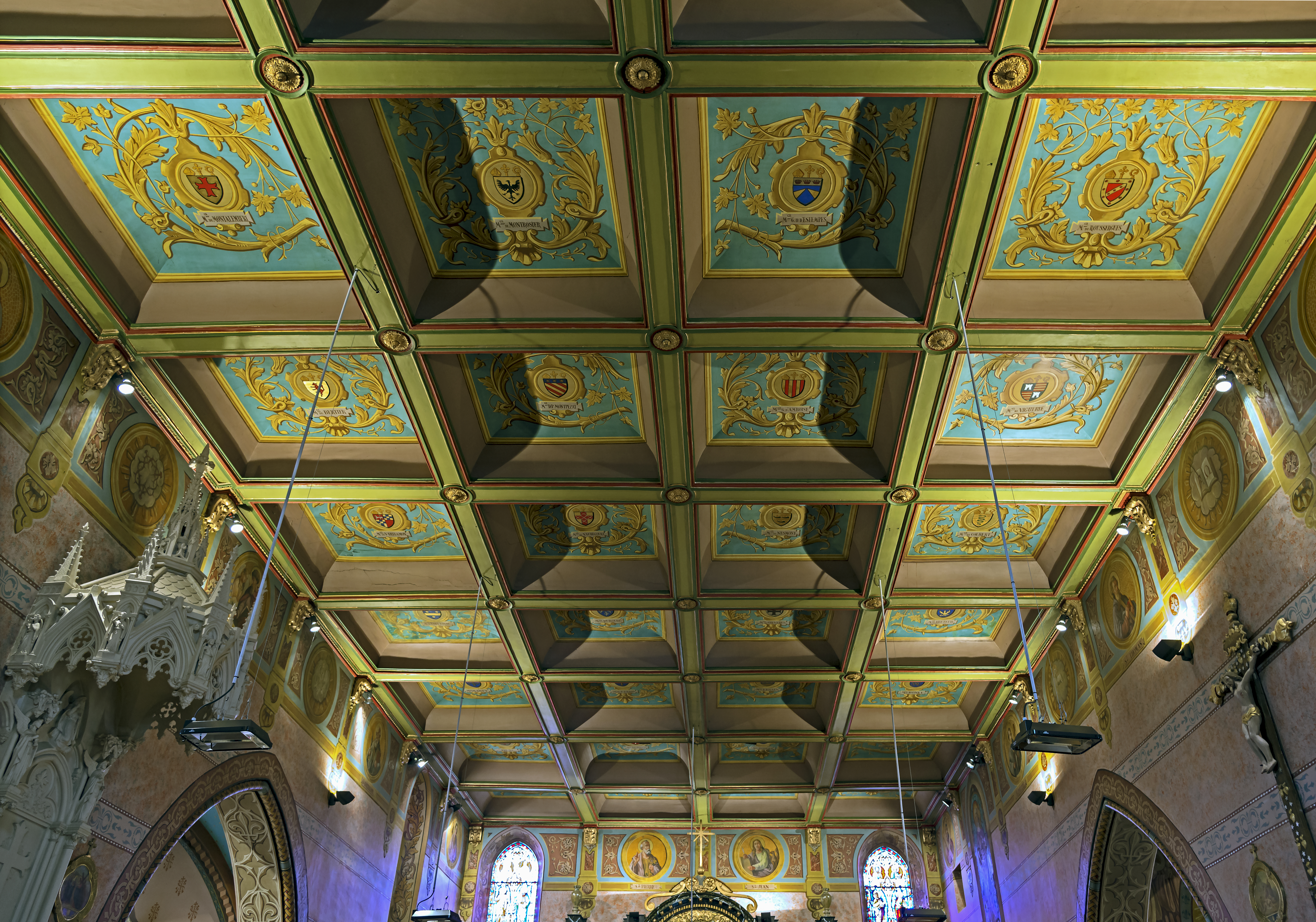
the ceiling

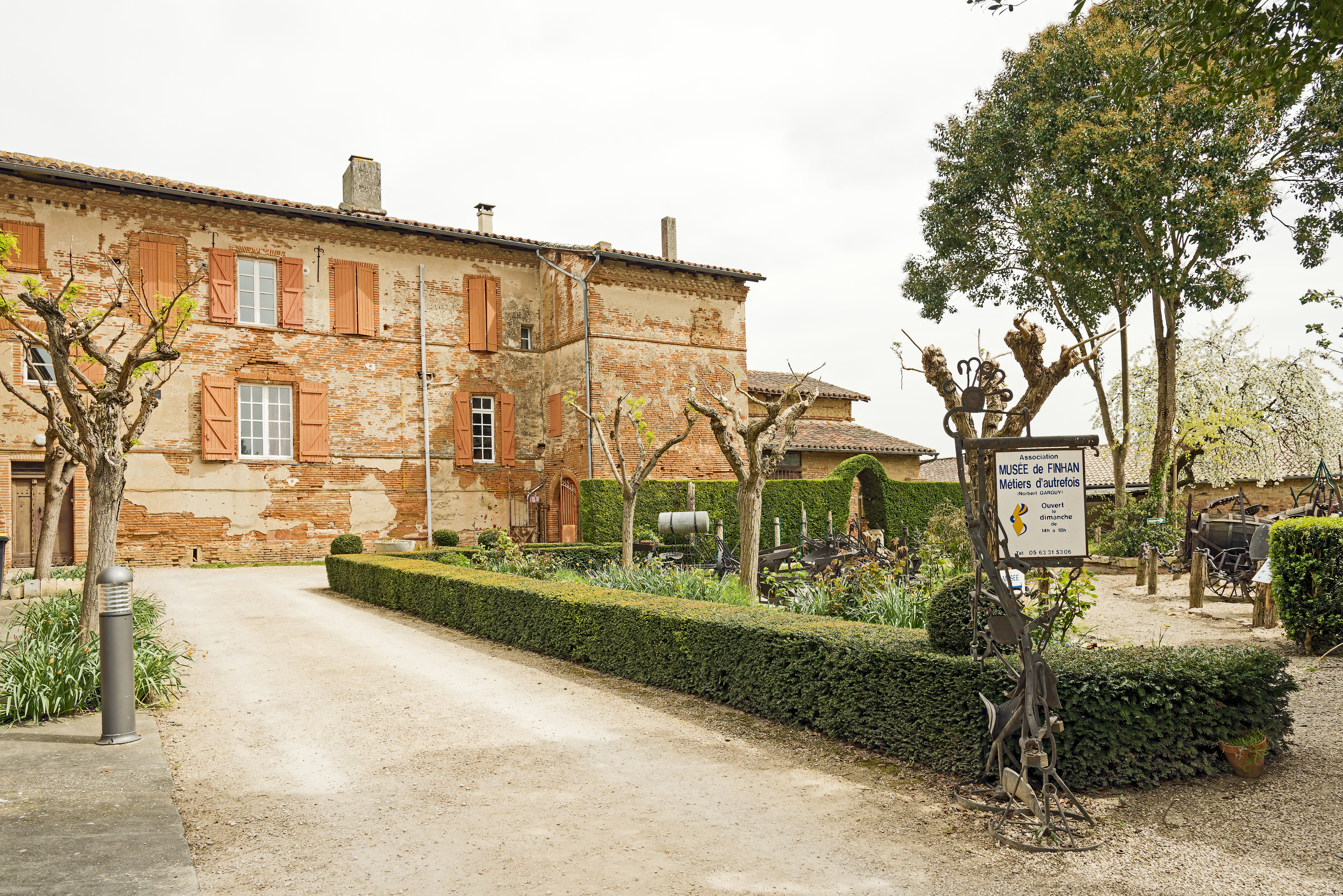
the Museum

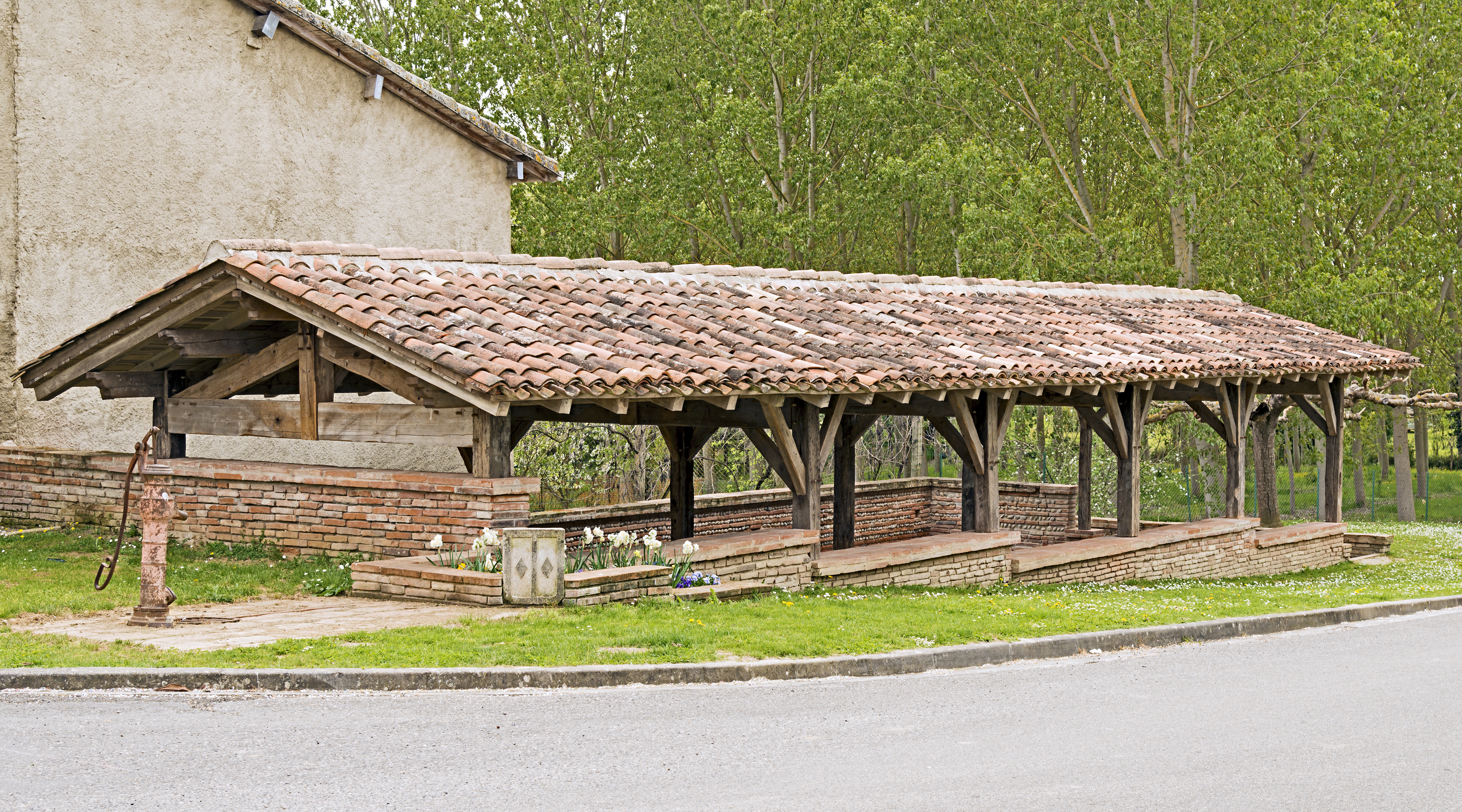
Laundry

== See also ==
- Communes of the Tarn-et-Garonne department
