= Bessens =

- Commune
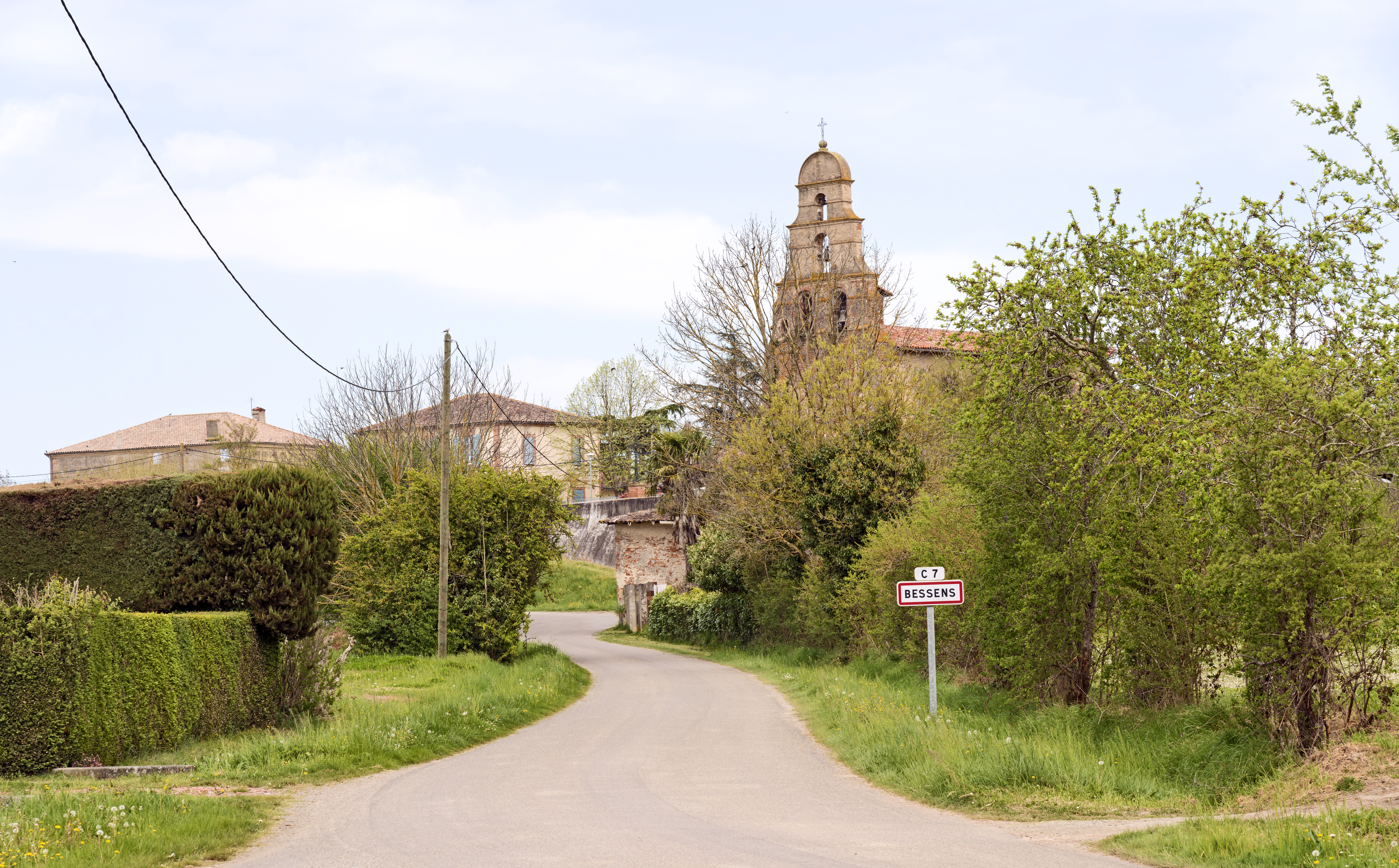

- Coat of arms
- Location of Bessens
- Location within France Location within Occitanie
- Coordinates: 43°52′50″N 1°15′11″E
- Country: France
- Region: Occitania
- Department: Tarn-et-Garonne
- Arrondissement: Montauban
- Canton: Montech

Government
  - Mayor (2020–2026): Adrien Raphet
- Area^{1}: 9.27 km^{2} (3.58 sq mi)
- Elevation: 104 m (341 ft)
- Highest elevation: 146 m (479 ft)
- Lowest elevation: 90 m (300 ft)
- Population (2023): 1,470
  - Density: 159/km^{2} (411/sq mi)
- Time zone: UTC+01:00 (CET)
  - Summer (DST): UTC+02:00 (CEST)
- INSEE/Postal code: 82017 /82170
- ^{1} French Land Register data, which excludes lakes, ponds, glaciers > 1 km^{2} (0.386 sq mi or 247 acres) and river estuaries.

Bessens (French pronunciation: [bɛsɑ̃s]) is a commune in the Tarn-et-Garonne department in the Occitanie region in southern France.

== Monuments ==
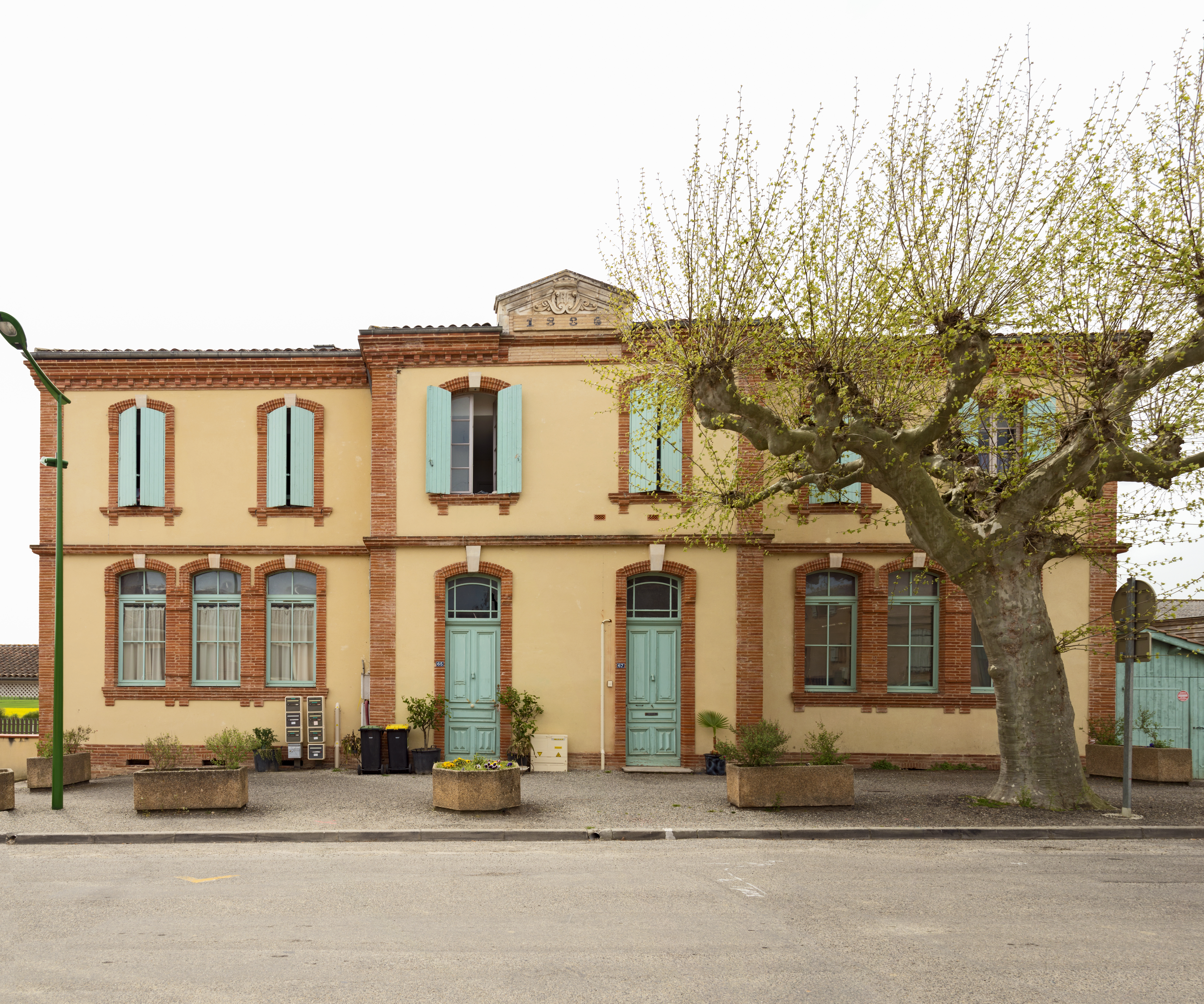
Town hall

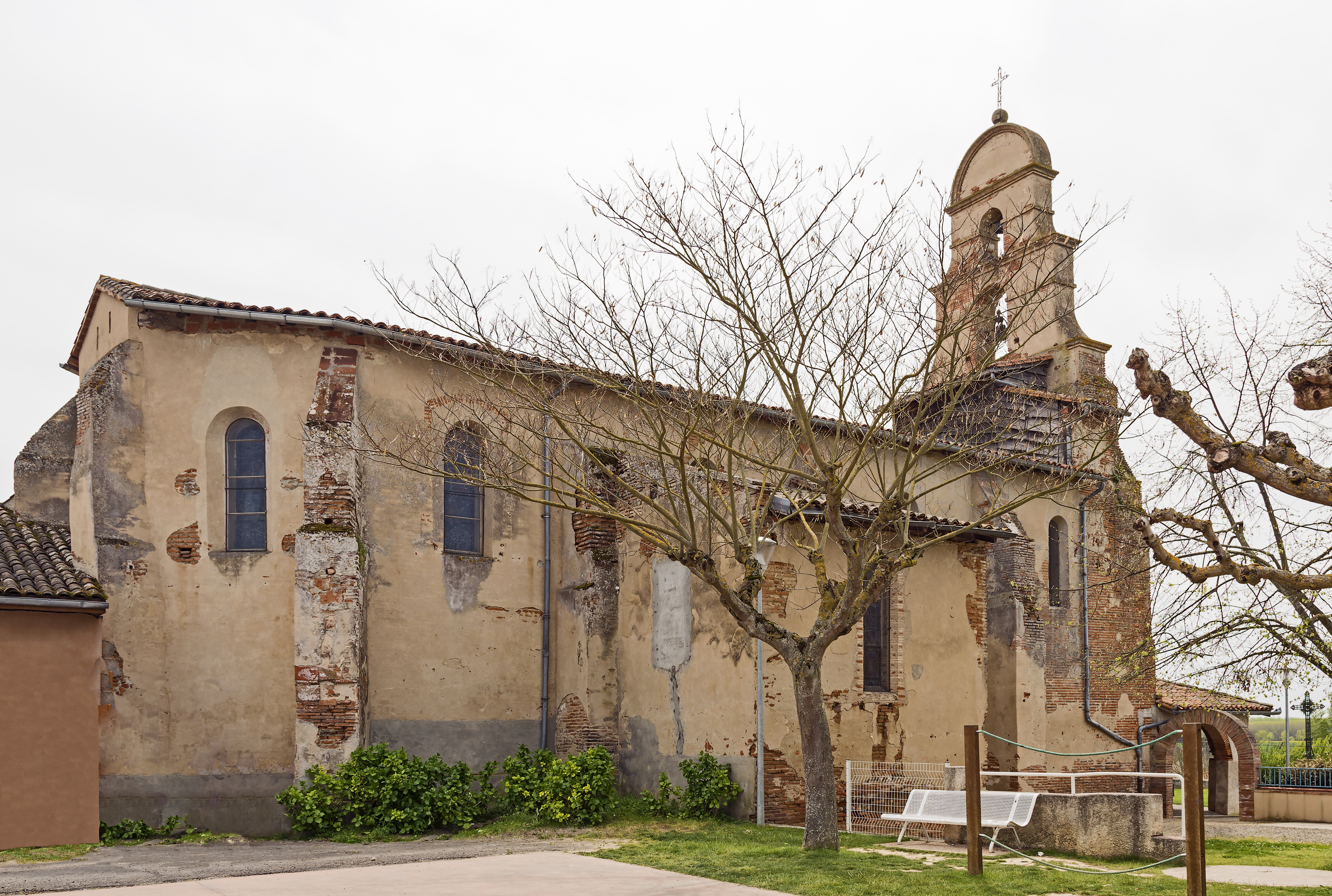
Church

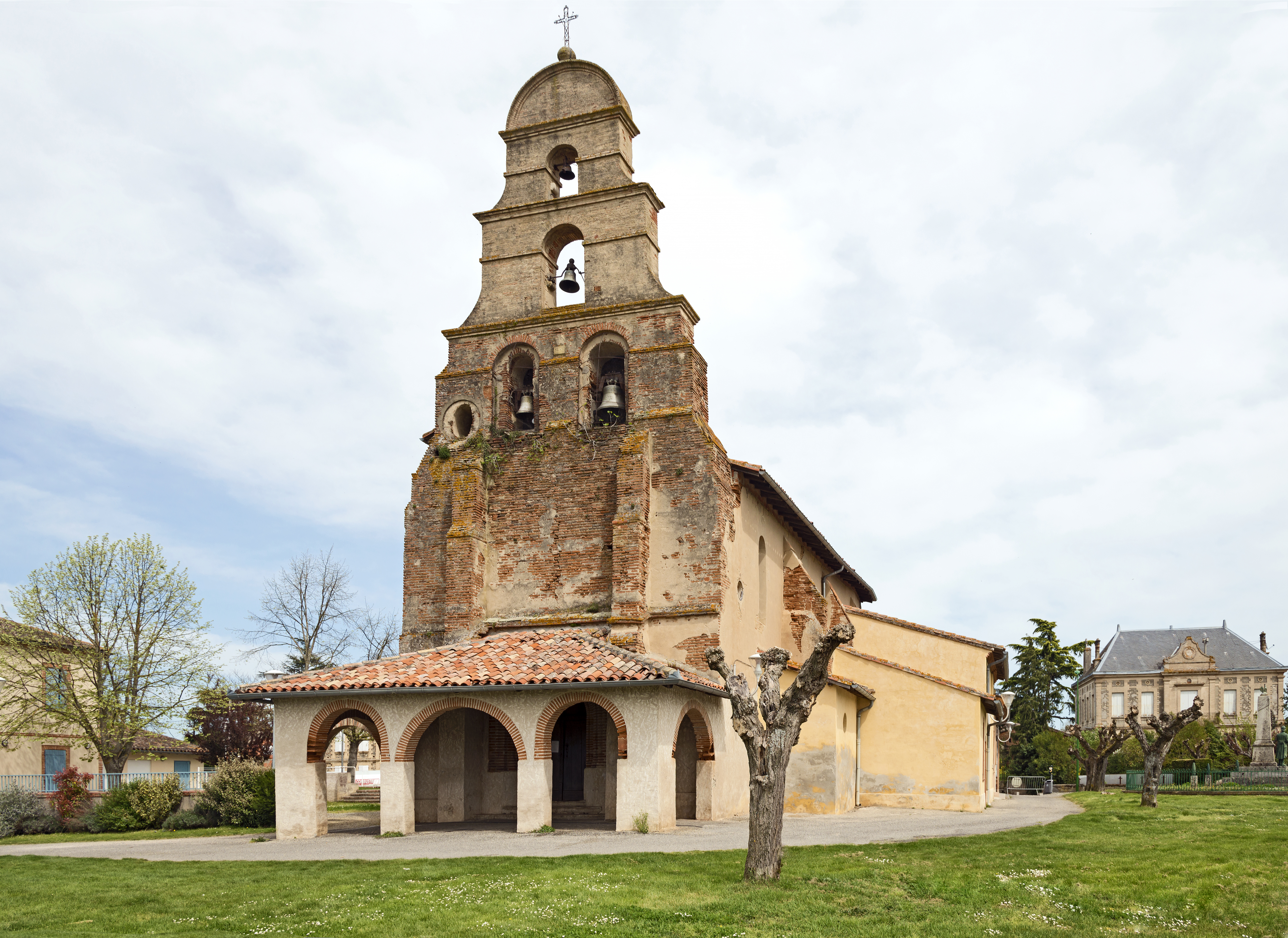
Bell gable

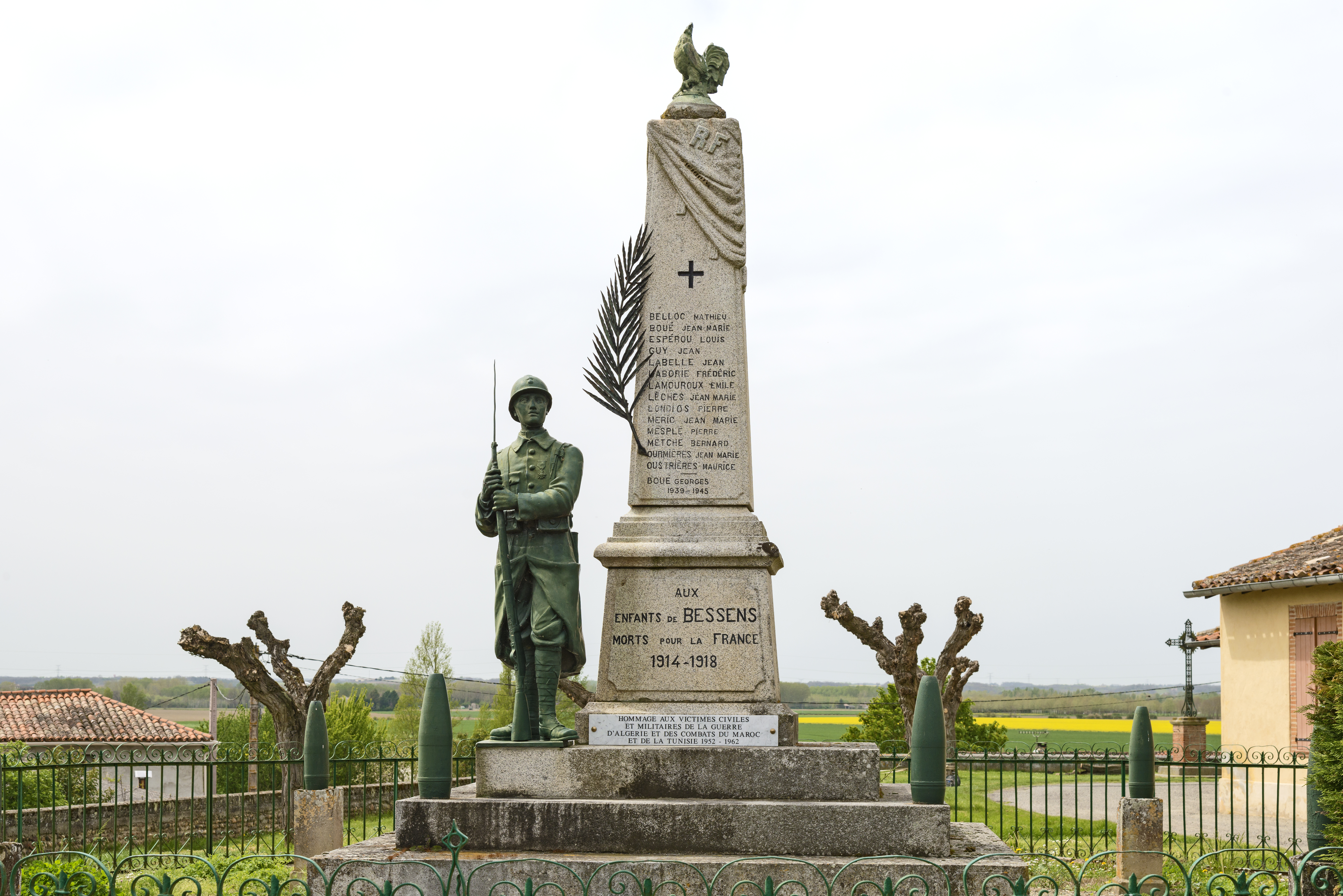
War memorial

== See also ==
- Communes of the Tarn-et-Garonne department
