= Bressols =

- Commune
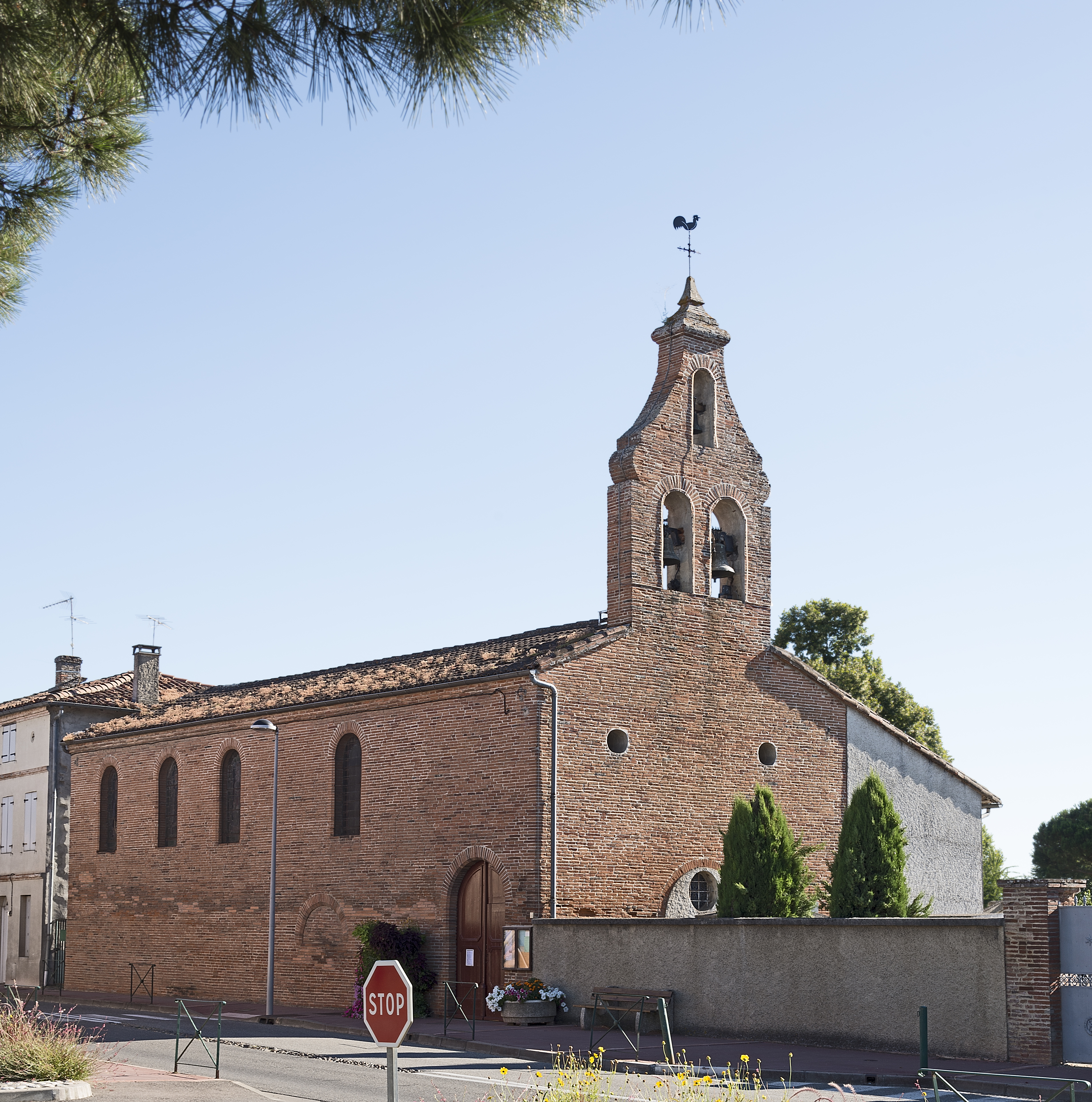
- The church of Our Lady of the Nativity, in Bressols

- Coat of arms
- Location of Bressols
- Location within France Location within Occitanie
- Coordinates: 43°58′08″N 1°20′20″E
- Country: France
- Region: Occitania
- Department: Tarn-et-Garonne
- Arrondissement: Montauban
- Canton: Montech
- Intercommunality: CA Grand Montauban

Government
  - Mayor (2020–2026): Jean Louis Ibres
- Area^{1}: 20.39 km^{2} (7.87 sq mi)
- Elevation: 90 m (300 ft)
- Highest elevation: 111 m (364 ft)
- Lowest elevation: 75 m (246 ft)
- Population (2023): 4,036
  - Density: 197.9/km^{2} (512.7/sq mi)
- Time zone: UTC+01:00 (CET)
  - Summer (DST): UTC+02:00 (CEST)
- INSEE/Postal code: 82025 /82700
- ^{1} French Land Register data, which excludes lakes, ponds, glaciers > 1 km^{2} (0.386 sq mi or 247 acres) and river estuaries.

Bressols (French pronunciation: [bʁɛsɔl]; Occitan: Bressòls) is a commune in the Tarn-et-Garonne department in the Occitanie region in southern France.

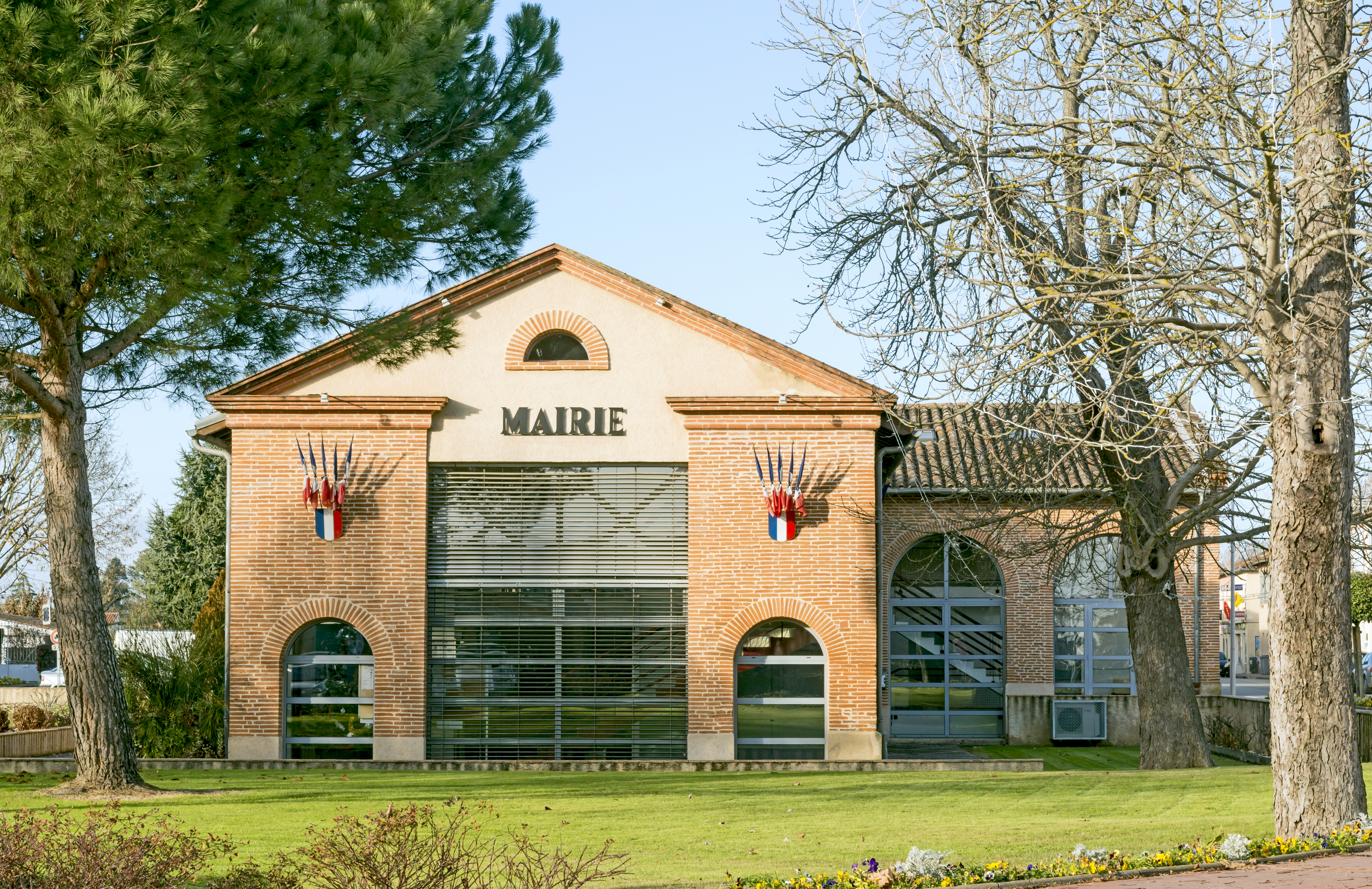
Town hall

== Population ==
Historical population
Year	Pop.	±% p.a.
1968	1,179	—
1975	1,352	+1.98%
1982	1,666	+3.03%
1990	2,247	+3.81%
1999	2,663	+1.91%
2007	3,441	+3.26%
2012	3,616	+1.00%
2017	3,697	+0.44%
2023	4,036	+1.47%
Source: INSEE

== See also ==
- Communes of the Tarn-et-Garonne department
