= Reyniès =

- Commune
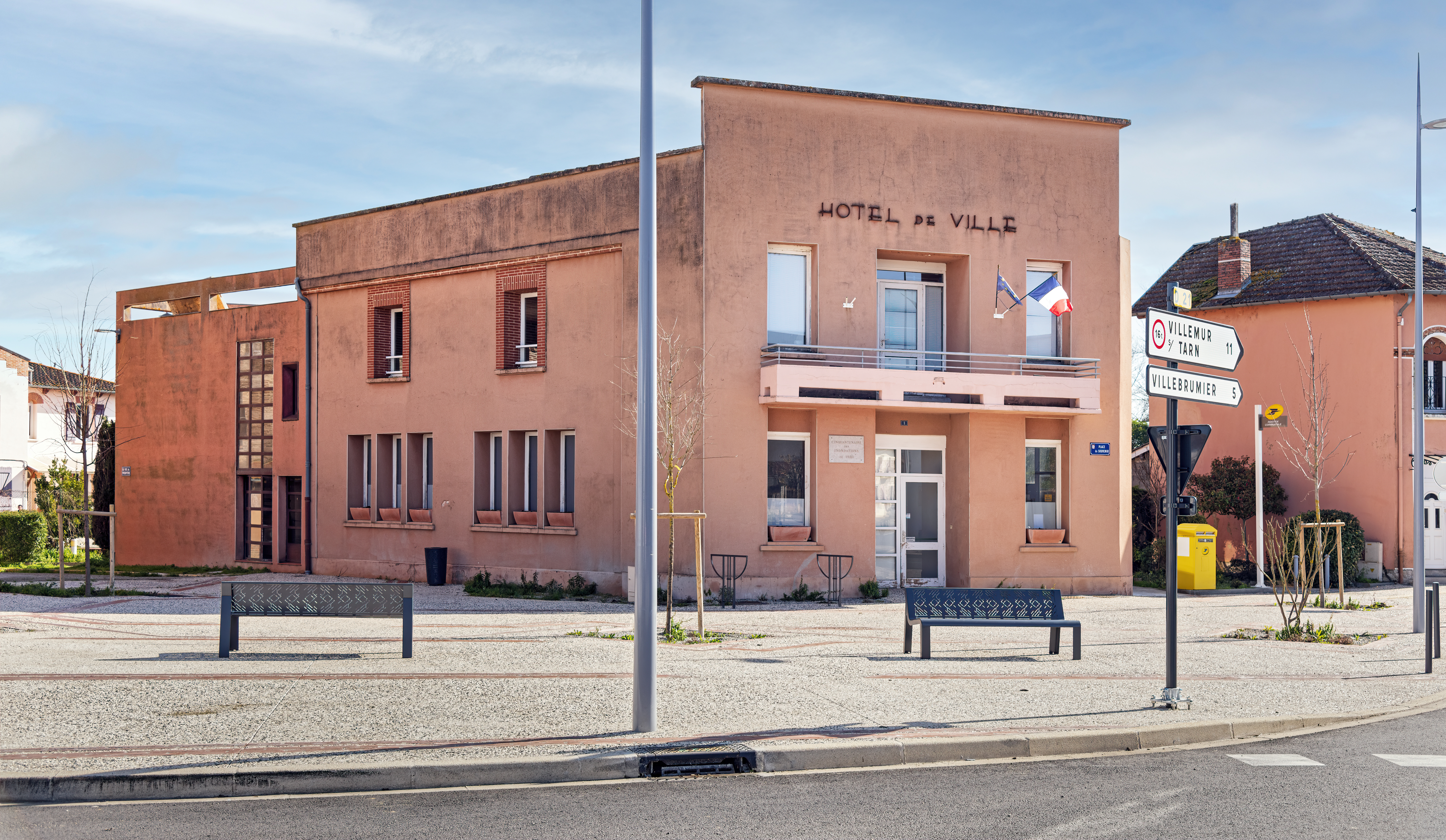
- The town hall

- Coat of arms
- Location of Reyniès
- Location within France Location within Occitanie
- Coordinates: 43°55′06″N 1°23′57″E
- Country: France
- Region: Occitania
- Department: Tarn-et-Garonne
- Arrondissement: Montauban
- Canton: Tarn-Tescou-Quercy vert
- Intercommunality: CA Grand Montauban

Government
  - Mayor (2020–2026): Claude Vigouroux
- Area^{1}: 9.94 km^{2} (3.84 sq mi)
- Elevation: 88 m (289 ft)
- Highest elevation: 204 m (669 ft)
- Lowest elevation: 75 m (246 ft)
- Population (2023): 872
  - Density: 87.7/km^{2} (227/sq mi)
- Time zone: UTC+01:00 (CET)
  - Summer (DST): UTC+02:00 (CEST)
- INSEE/Postal code: 82150 /82370
- ^{1} French Land Register data, which excludes lakes, ponds, glaciers > 1 km^{2} (0.386 sq mi or 247 acres) and river estuaries.

Reyniès (French pronunciation: [ʁɛjnjɛs]; Occitan: Reinièrs) is a commune in the Tarn-et-Garonne department in the Occitanie region in southern France.

== See also ==
- Communes of the Tarn-et-Garonne department
