= Canton of Montech =

Coordinates: 43.96°N 1.23°E

The canton of Montech is an administrative division of the Tarn-et-Garonne department, in southern France. Its seat is in Montech.

It consists of the following communes:

1. Albefeuille-Lagarde
2. Bessens
3. Bressols
4. Finhan
5. Lacourt-Saint-Pierre
6. Monbéqui
7. Montbartier
8. Montbeton
9. Montech
