= Montbeton =

- Commune
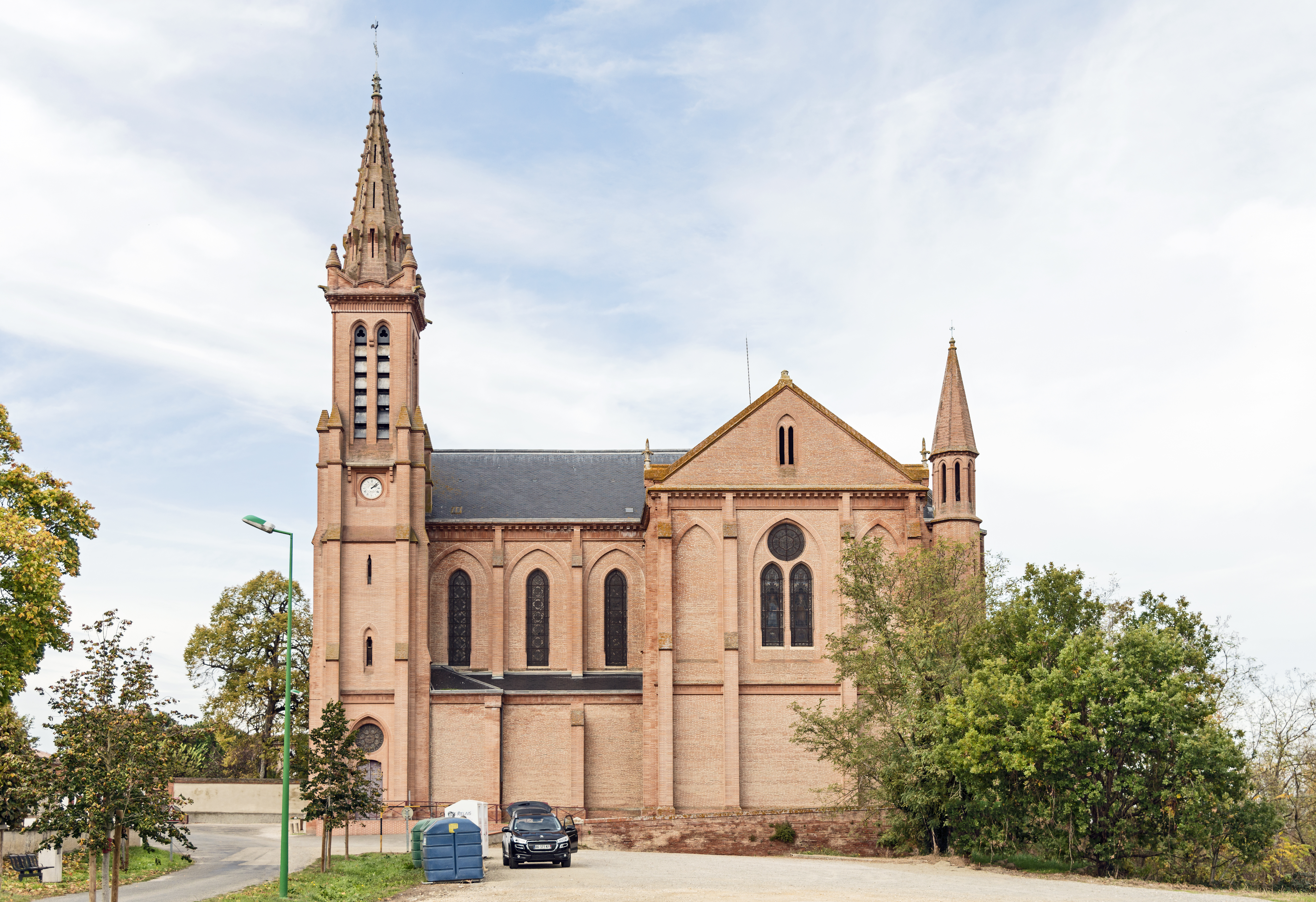

- Coat of arms
- Location of Montbeton
- Location within France Location within Occitanie
- Coordinates: 44°00′43″N 1°17′09″E
- Country: France
- Region: Occitania
- Department: Tarn-et-Garonne
- Arrondissement: Montauban
- Canton: Montech
- Intercommunality: CA Grand Montauban

Government
  - Mayor (2021–2026): Danielle Bedos
- Area^{1}: 15.98 km^{2} (6.17 sq mi)
- Elevation: 100 m (330 ft)
- Highest elevation: 105 m (344 ft)
- Lowest elevation: 76 m (249 ft)
- Population (2023): 4,400
  - Density: 280/km^{2} (710/sq mi)
- Time zone: UTC+01:00 (CET)
  - Summer (DST): UTC+02:00 (CEST)
- INSEE/Postal code: 82124 /82290
- ^{1} French Land Register data, which excludes lakes, ponds, glaciers > 1 km^{2} (0.386 sq mi or 247 acres) and river estuaries.

Montbeton (French pronunciation: [mɔ̃bətɔ̃]) is a commune in the Tarn-et-Garonne department in the Occitanie region in southern France.

== Population ==
Historical population
Year	Pop.	±% p.a.
1968	1,198	—
1975	1,324	+1.44%
1982	1,458	+1.39%
1990	1,786	+2.57%
1999	2,111	+1.87%
2007	3,433	+6.27%
2012	3,597	+0.94%
2017	4,279	+3.53%
2023	4,400	+0.47%
Source: INSEE

== See also ==
- Communes of the Tarn-et-Garonne department
