= Chevroches =

- Commune
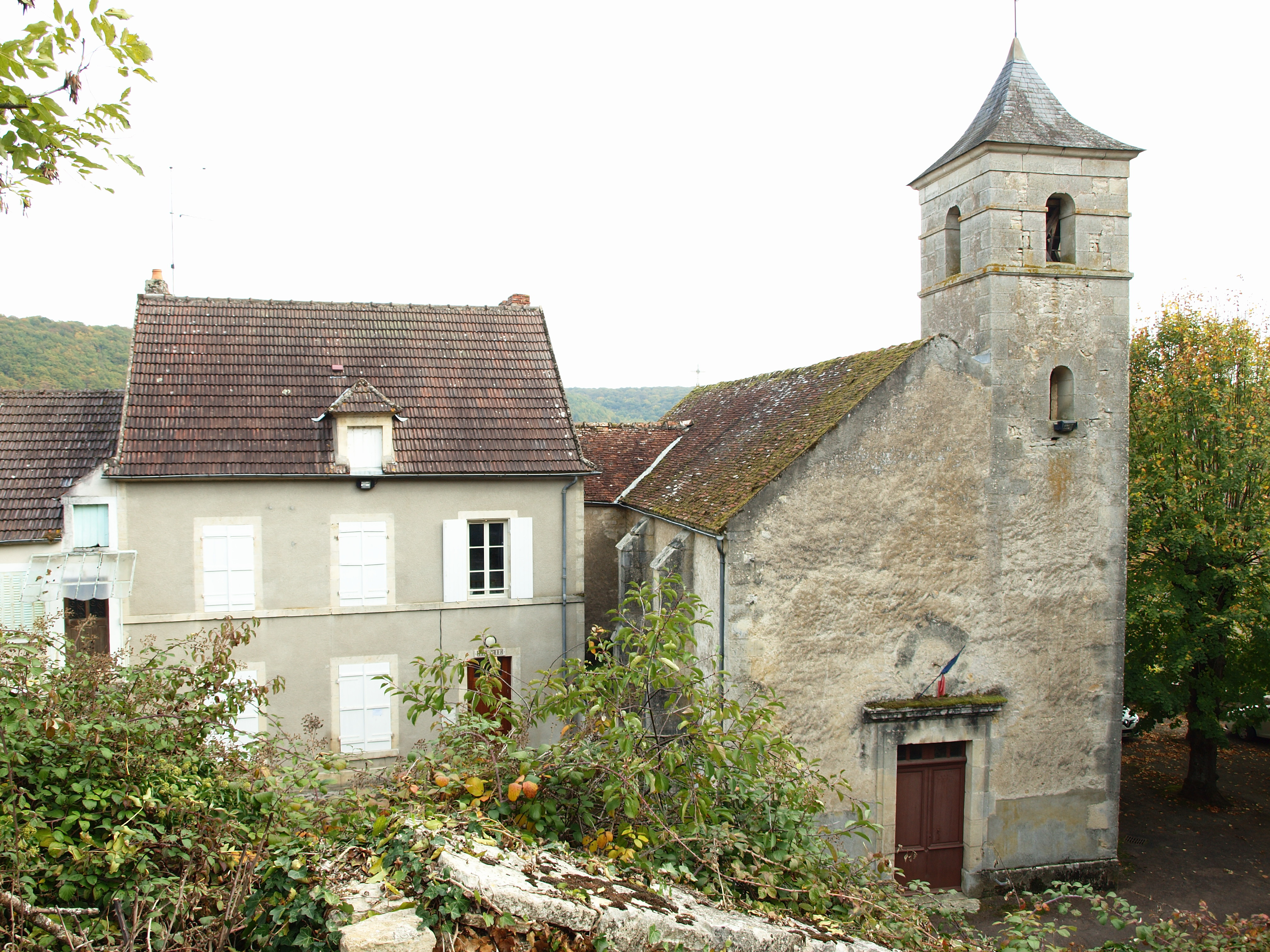
- Town hall and church
- Location of Chevroches
- Location within France Location within Bourgogne-Franche-Comté
- Coordinates: 47°27′02″N 3°32′47″E
- Country: France
- Region: Bourgogne-Franche-Comté
- Department: Nièvre
- Arrondissement: Clamecy
- Canton: Clamecy

Government
  - Mayor (2020–2026): Jean-Louis Lebeau
- Area^{1}: 3.21 km^{2} (1.24 sq mi)
- Highest elevation: 229 m (751 ft)
- Lowest elevation: 147 m (482 ft)
- Population (2023): 113
  - Density: 35.2/km^{2} (91.2/sq mi)
- Time zone: UTC+01:00 (CET)
  - Summer (DST): UTC+02:00 (CEST)
- INSEE/Postal code: 58073 /58500
- ^{1} French Land Register data, which excludes lakes, ponds, glaciers > 1 km^{2} (0.386 sq mi or 247 acres) and river estuaries.

Chevroches (IPA: [ʃəvʁɔʃ]) is a commune, a village, in the Nièvre department in Bourgogne-Franche-Comté, in central France. Inhabitants are called Cavarocois (IPA: [kavaʁɔkwa]) in French.

== Geography ==
Chevroches lies between the Canal du Nivernais, the river Yonne, and the place where the river Yonne used to be.

== History ==
This village is really old, according to archeologists, there was smithing activity from the second to the fourth century. All the ancient objects which has been found there are now in a museum in Clamecy, just few miles away from Chevroches.

This village church was probably built in the ninth century, and Chevroches old name was "Cava Roca" [ kava ʁɔka ] which means hollow rock. That name is linked to the stone quarry, which is now abandoned.

== See also ==
- Communes of the Nièvre department
