= Verneuil, Nièvre =

Verneuil
- Commune
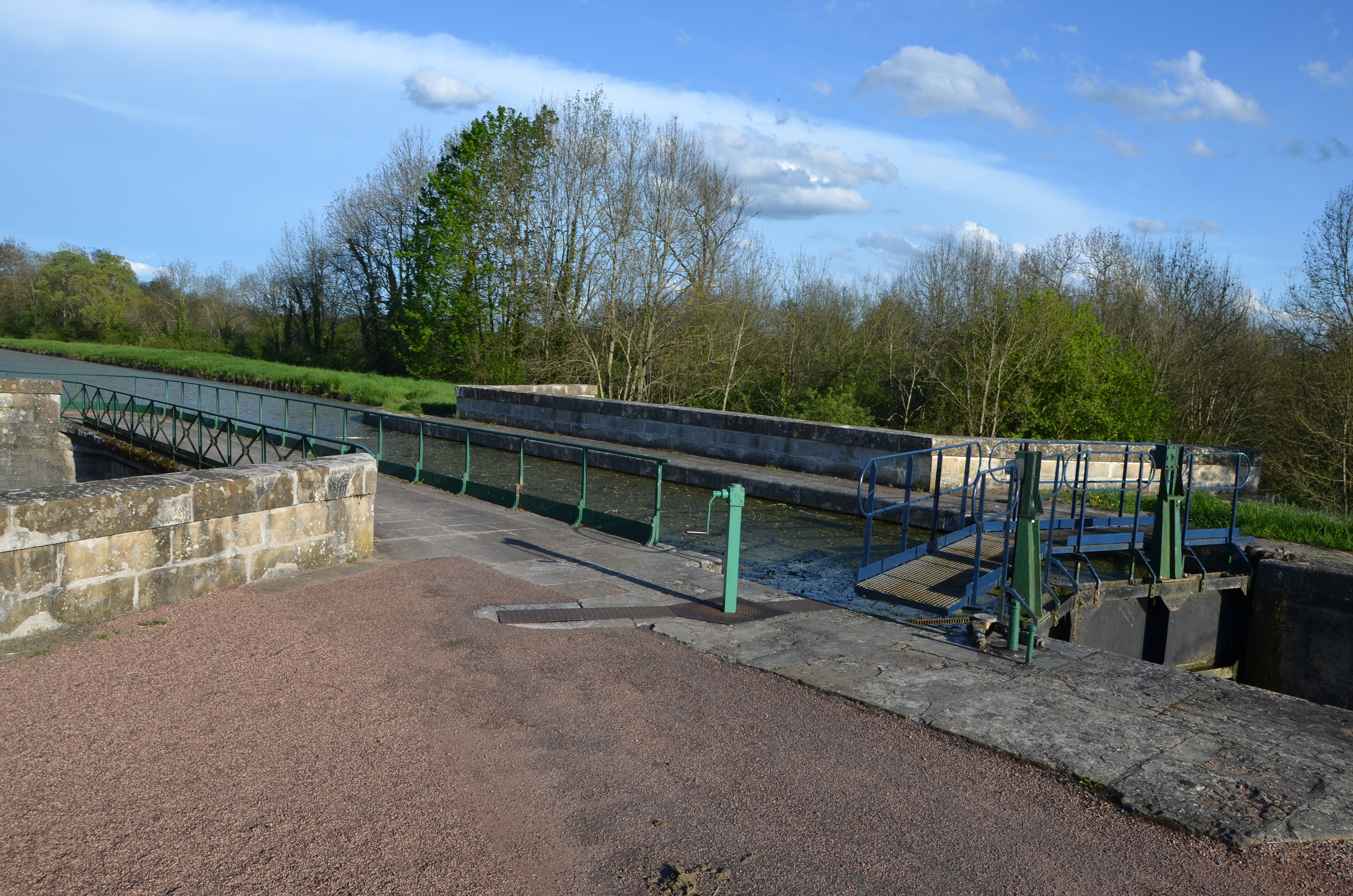
- The canal viaduct on the Canal du Nivernais
- Location of Verneuil
- Location within France Location within Bourgogne-Franche-Comté
- Coordinates: 46°52′04″N 3°34′14″E
- Country: France
- Region: Bourgogne-Franche-Comté
- Department: Nièvre
- Arrondissement: Nevers
- Canton: Decize

Government
  - Mayor (2020–2026): David Colas
- Area^{1}: 26.86 km^{2} (10.37 sq mi)
- Highest elevation: 266 m (873 ft)
- Lowest elevation: 191 m (627 ft)
- Population (2023): 274
  - Density: 10.2/km^{2} (26.4/sq mi)
- Time zone: UTC+01:00 (CET)
  - Summer (DST): UTC+02:00 (CEST)
- INSEE/Postal code: 58306 /58300
- ^{1} French Land Register data, which excludes lakes, ponds, glaciers > 1 km^{2} (0.386 sq mi or 247 acres) and river estuaries.

Verneuil (French pronunciation: [vɛʁnœj]) is a commune in the Nièvre department in central France.

== See also ==
- Communes of the Nièvre department
