= Couitéas affair =

Financial and political scandal

The Couitéas affair, also called the Henchir Tabia-el-Houbira affair, was a financial and political and scandal in the French Protectorate of Tunisia. It concerned an attempt to expropriate communal land belonging to Tunisian tribespeople. Their mobilization, with the support of some French politicians, including Jean Jaurès, eventually led to the government of the protectorate recognizing their rights, and the case concluded with a decision which still sets a precedent in French law today.

== Background ==
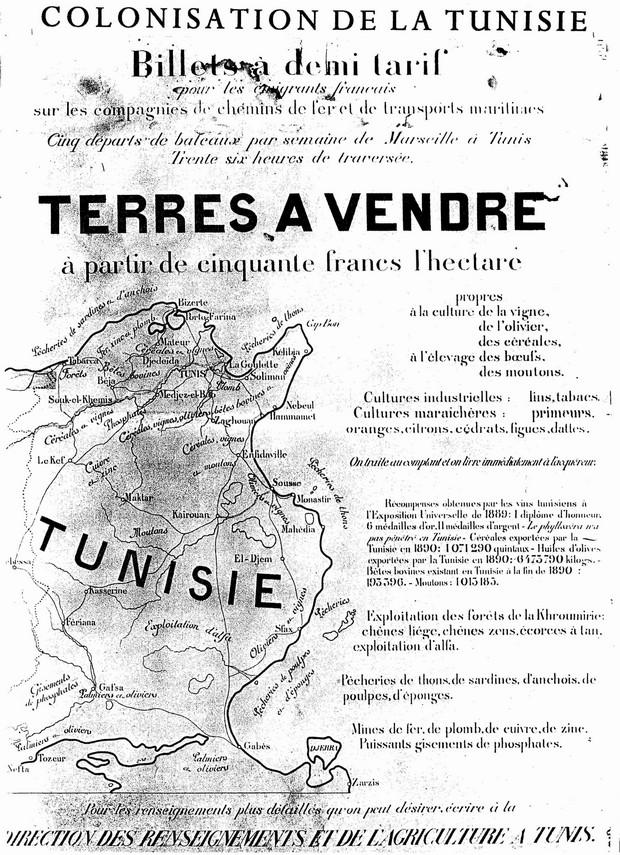
Promoting the sale of Tunisian land to Europeans, c.1890

After the establishment of the protectorate in 1881, the French government tried to encourage French people to settle in the territory. However it was not easy to purchase land because although title deeds often existed, there was no cadastre. Some land titles were also based on custom and practice and lacked formal documentation. To put an end to this uncertainty, a decree of 1 July 1885 established a new process for the registration of land ownership. This involved publishing notices locally and nationally, after which the claim and any challenges to it were sent to a mixed tribunal made up of seven members: a French magistrate in the chair, sitting with three other French and three Tunisian magistrates. The court’s task was to validate or deny the registration request. There was no appeal against its decisions.

== Henchir Tabia-el-Houbira ==
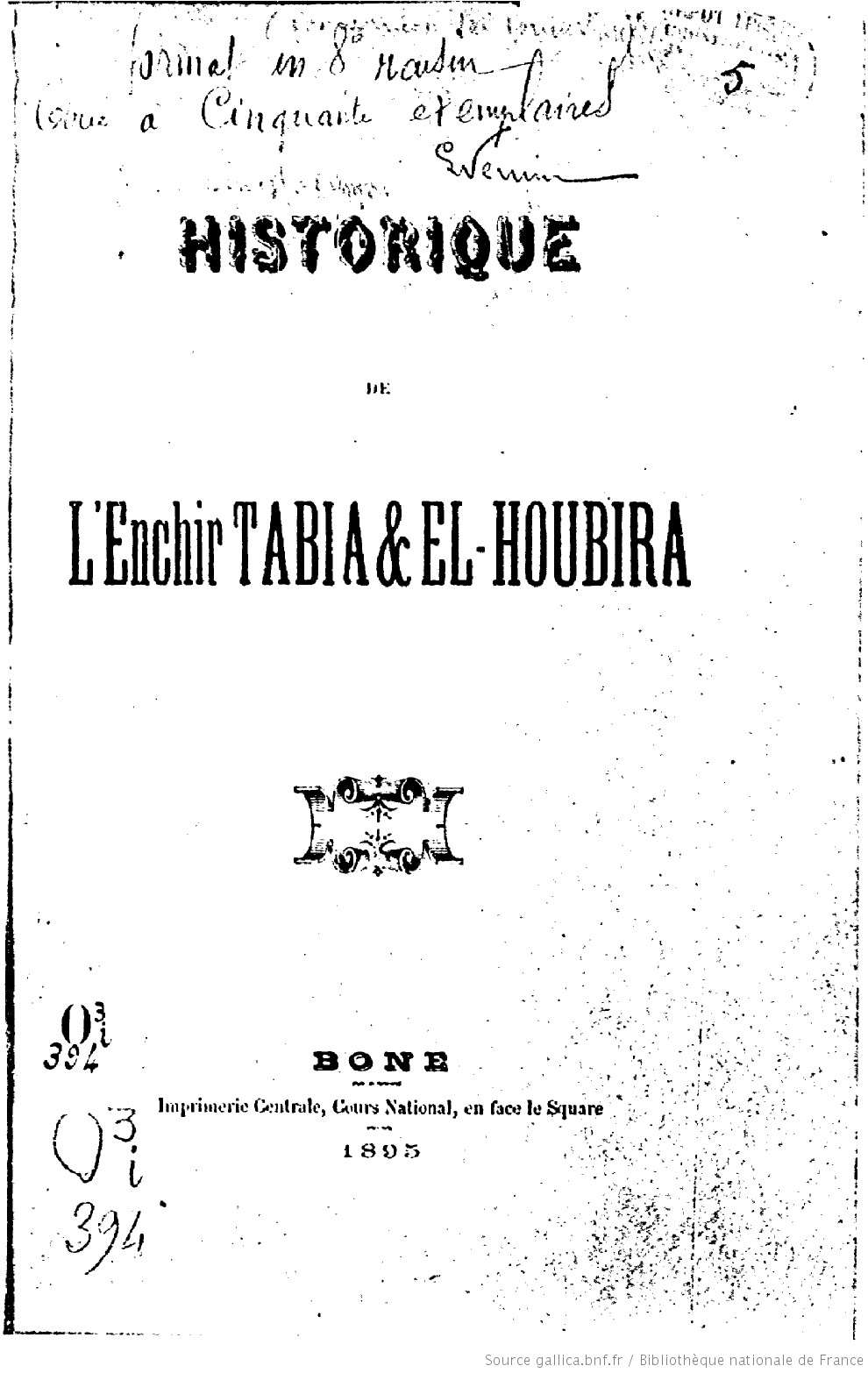
pamphlet cover: Historique de l'enchir Tabia & El Houbira

The property known as the henchir of Tabia-el-Houbira was 65,000 hectare estate located in the low steppes between Sousse and Kairouan. On January 30, 1731, Hussein Bey gifted it to the marabout Hadj Fradj ben el Ghali. The gift deed specified that "all those who plow in the said henchir will pay the marabout achour (tax on crops) in wheat and barley. This donation is made by us to help the above to feed the poor and the unfortunate.”

In 1887, the heirs of the marabout, scattered across Tunisia and Tripolitania, agreed to sell their shares in the property. Some went to the Tunisian general Hassen Tordjman, and another part to a European by the name of Athanasio Grégorio. A third part of the estate was sold to a Frenchman from Annaba, Dominique Bertagna. However, the people who actually occupied the land, members of the Souassi and fr:Jlass tribes, refused to pay him any rent, arguing that they had always been there and that their ancestors had never paid anything. Bertagna’s attempts to use both the sharia and the French courts to force them to pay rent were unsuccessful. The three legal owners publicised their situation in a pamphlet, “History of the auction of Tabia & El Houbira”, and decided to combine their efforts by creating a joint property management company on April 27, 1894, which they invited Basilio Couitéas to join.

Couitéas was a Greek national, born in Sparta in 1860, who had arrived in Tunisia in 1879, where he set himself up in the grain trade with the help of a French brother-in-law, a trader based in Annaba. After the establishment of the protectorate, he became vice-consul of Greece in Sfax as well as rich tax farmer. In 1886, he became director general of the tax farm that held the tobacco monopoly. Become very rich following a family inheritance of two and a half million francs, he married in 1897 Alice de Faucamberge, daughter of the colonel commanding the garrison of Kairouan. On the birth of his son Jean Couiteas de Faucamberge in 1901, he took French nationality.

== Couitéas’ attempts to secure recognition of title ==
Faced with intimidation, some of the traditional occupants of the land gave in and accepted the new leases offered priced at five dollars per méchia (or thirty cents per hectare). These rent agreements were later used to claim the validity of Couitéas’ title.

Using his connections, Couitéas made various attempts to assert the validity of his property titles with the government of the protectorate. On December 16, 1895 he filed a request with the mixed court to have his title deeds validated and his ownership registered, stating that the purchase price had been an annual enzel (perpetual annuity) of 2,100 francs. The request was rejected on March 2, 1901 as the court found that most of the occupants of the land in question did not recognise his ownership, and the stated purchase price seemed implausibly low for such a large estate. The court was not therefore satisfied that the original titles to the land were sound, or that Couitéas exercised effective possession of the land.

In parallel with this case Couitéas tried to argue his claim with the Department of Agriculture but its response in 1898 was that "even if the titles that Mr. Couitéas has provided are authentic, they do not have the value he attributes to them, and nothing can prevail, in justice or in law, over the immemorial possession of hundreds and thousands of natives.”

An official decree of the protectorate government of January 14, 1901 sought to put an end to any attempts to dispossess the Tunisian tribes by decreeing "that these collective territories are inalienable, the members of the tribe having only a right of use over them".

== Arbitration Commission ==
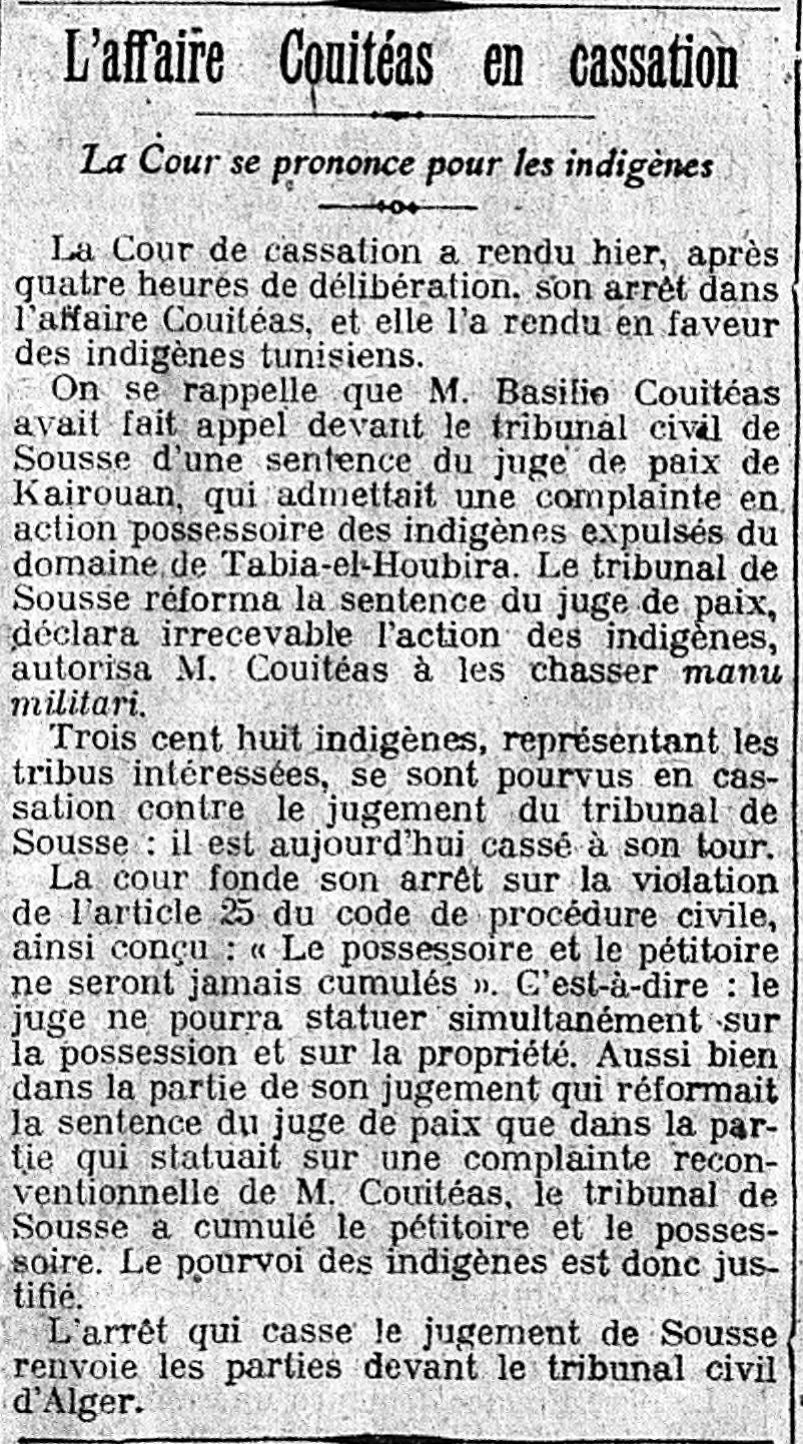
Appeal judgement overturning the Sousse verdict

Despite all these failures, Couitéas refused to give up. He hired Moroccans who confiscated herds of animals found on the property and only returned them in return for payment; fights broke out between his guards and the occupants, who told the gendarmes who were trying to restore order: "We are in our own home here, no one will chase us out, and if we folded up our tents when the huissier de justice came and ordered us to do so, it is only because there were only women here on the day he appeared.”

Couitéas bought out the shares of his three partners on November 13, 1904, for an amount, according to him, of 701,500 francs. Armed with his property titles, he demanded from the Tunisian occupiers an exorbitant rent of 11 francs per hectare instead of the 30 centimes that they had previously been asked for and that they already refused to pay. At the same time, he obtained from the Crédit Foncier d'Algérie et de Tunisie a loan of 750,000 francs using the rents from l'henchir de Tabia-el-Houbira as collateral.

Next, although no appeal was possible from the decisions of the mixed tribunal, Couitéas used his political support to try and overturn its 1901 judgement. Eventually an arbitration commission was appointed on November 15, 1904, composed of three senior officials but no magistrate: Paul Ducroquet (former director general of Tunisian finances), Charles Tauchon (vice-consul of France in Tunis) and Jules Abribat (court interpreter in Tunis).

This tribunal found that the perimeters of the disputed land showed all the signs of being established private property, with earthen walls, wells and cultivated areas, while the central area showed no such signs. The conclusion of the arbitrators was therefore that 27,000 hectares of well-tended and managed land belonged to their indigenous owners, while 30,000 hectares in the central area would go to Couitéas. This arbitration was ratified on February 15, 1906.

The occupants of the land then went to court themselves, and 308 to sought justice at the administrative court of Sousse, which dismissed their case on February 13, 1908. They appealed against this judgment, and in May 15, 1911, part of the original judgment was quashed: the Court of Cassation found against the court of Sousse for having ruled simultaneously on ownership rights and occupation rights. The case was therefore referred to the civil court of Algiers.

== Dispossession of Couitéas ==
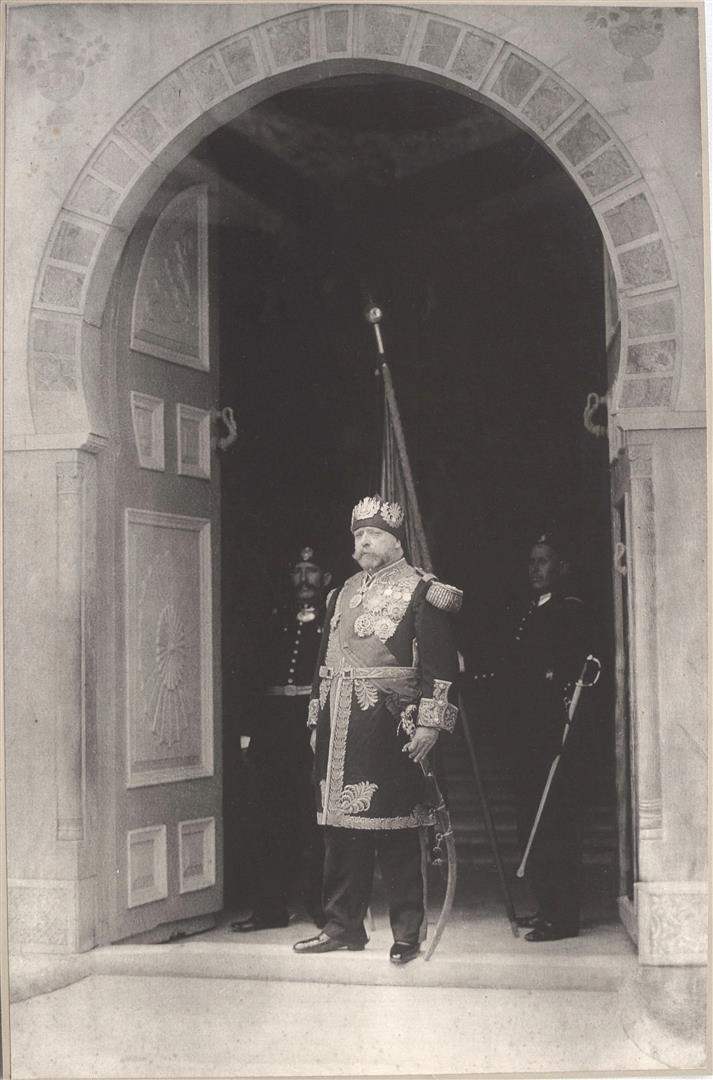
Naceur Bey, ruler of Tunisia

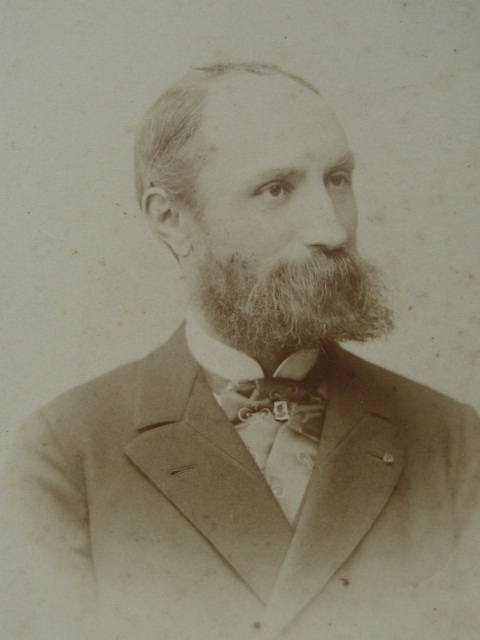
Resident General Gabriel Alapetite

The departure of Resident General Stephen Pichon on December 29, 1906 deprived Couitéas of his strongest supporter. His successor, Gabriel Alapetite refused him any help, rejecting his requests to send the police to clear the occupants off his land. Finally, a beylical decree of November 23, 1908 overturned the decision of the arbitration commission:

"Considering that the compromise of 14 and November 15, 1904, the additional act of January 20, 1905 and the arbitration report of the February 15, 1906 have not been subject to our sanction, they are void and therefore cannot stand in the way of the application of the law;

Considering, moreover, that these acts, far from having the result of resolving the disputes which they were intended to settle, have only aggravated local difficulties and that it is important to put an end to a situation likely to compromise public tranquillity;

On the proposal of the Prime Minister, after being assured of the consent of the French government:

Act I.- The survey of collective tribal lands will be carried out in the caïdat des Jlass. The survey of collective lands of tribes in the caïdat des Souassi prescribed since the August 15, 1906 will be carried out in the territories which have remained outside their scope until today."

By this decree, the henchir of Tabia-el-Houbira was reinstated as inalienable collective land and its occupants recovered the right of use. All of Couitéas' property deeds were declared void.

== The dispute moves to France ==
With the protectorate government in Tunisia now clearly opposed to him, Couitéas began trying to find allies in France who would urge his case. He had some success among those who were opposed to what they saw as arbitrary decisions by the French administration in Tunisia, and the wide-ranging authority of politicians to exercise authority, effectively without scrutiny.

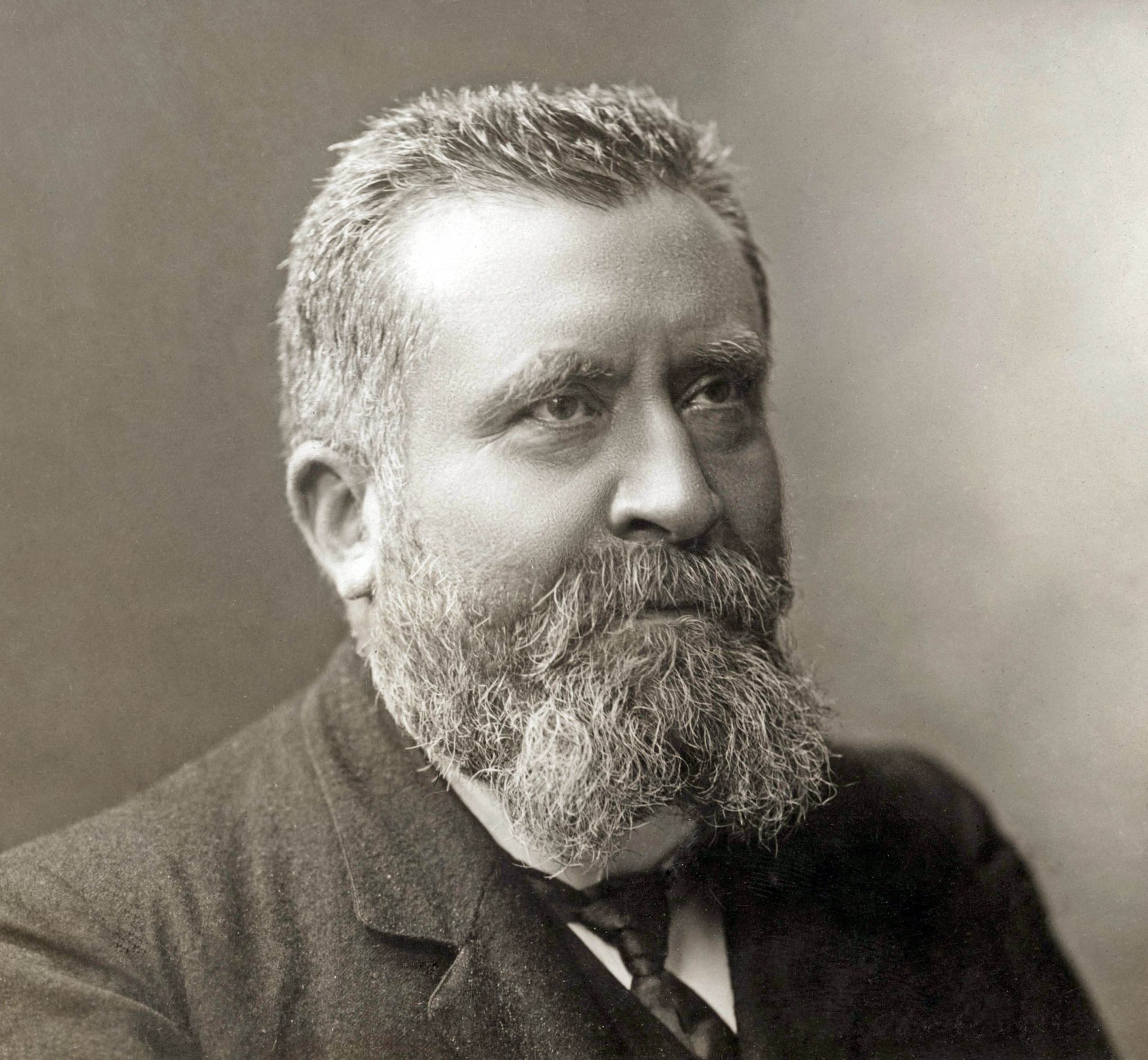
Jean Jaurès

In March 1911, the League of Human and Citizen's Rights published a brochure entitled L'arbitraire en Tunisie, written following the investigation of one of its members, the lawyer Goudchaux-Brunschvicg. It did not specifically mention the Couitéas affair, but it did underline the dangers raised by the registration of collective land. Two months after it was published, Jean Jaurès signed an editorial in L'Humanité, in which he warned those who were aligning themselves with the businessman:

“There are newspapers, whose good faith was undoubtedly taken advantage of, where the just protest against the iniquities and the looting in Tunisia is accompanied by a kind of apology for Mr. Couitéas. However, Mr. Couitéas made the most scandalous attempt at expropriation committed in Tunisia against Tunisians […] What is certain, which, from the point of view of political and social morality dominates the whole debate, is that thousands of natives who had been in possession for generations were suddenly threatened with expulsion by the production of a title that was more than suspect: it is that Mr. Couitéas tried to seize forty thousand hectares from them, acquired by him from a daring trafficker, for the cynically ridiculous royalty of thirty-two millimes, just over three cents per hectare per year. This is certain because the directorate of agriculture in Tunisia has pointed out the fraudulent nature of the operation […]

But Mr. Couitéas has not stopped maneuvering. He had succeeded for a moment in playing on the good faith of the League of Human Rights. They were kind enough to listen to me and conclude that there was no need to take an interest in Mr. Couitéas […] It would really be too convenient for a scandal to succeed in getting lost in the multitude of scandals around him. There is an oriental proverb which says: "Shall the camel hide in the dust of the caravan?".

== The chamber of deputies ==
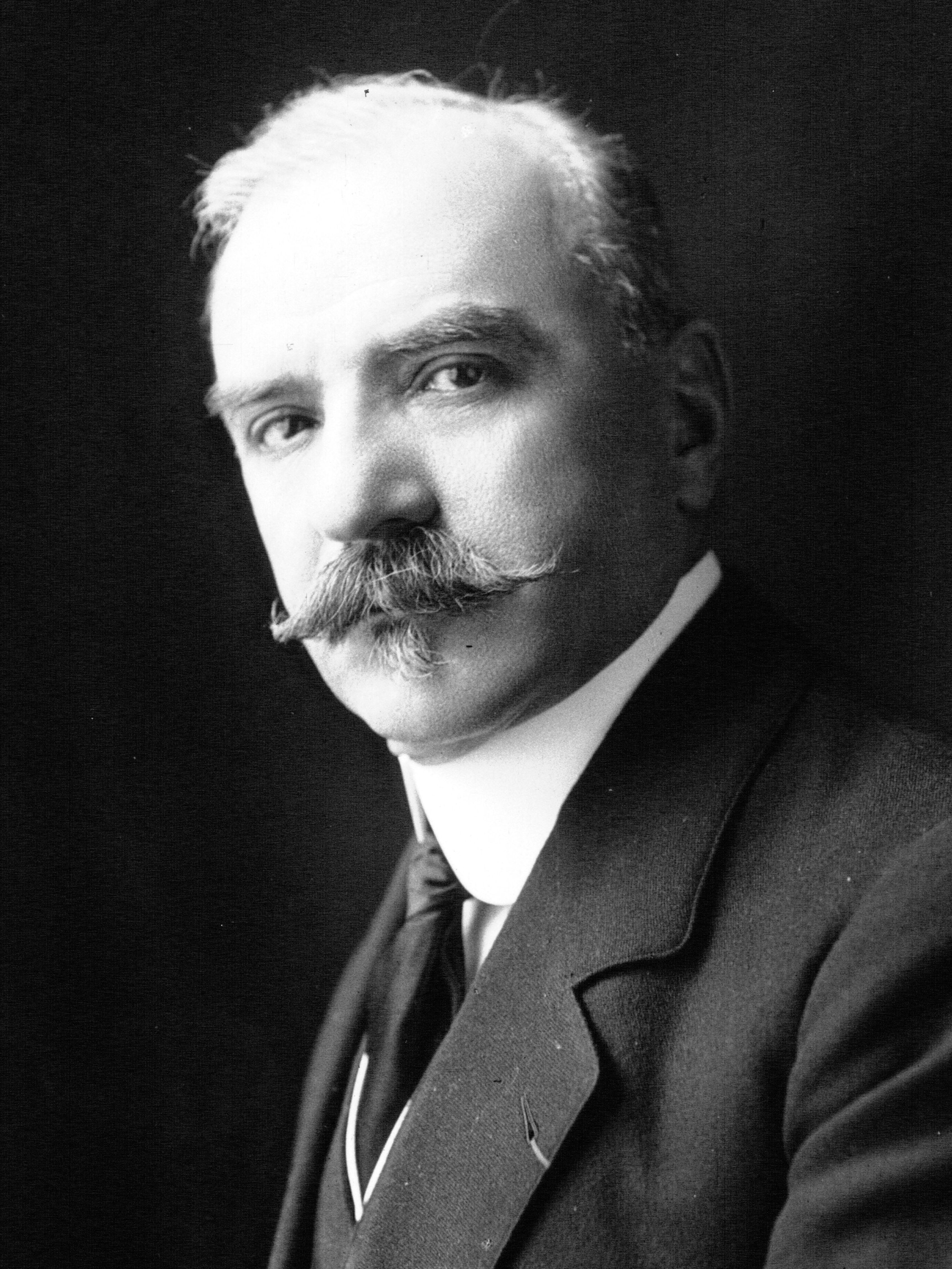
Émile Driant

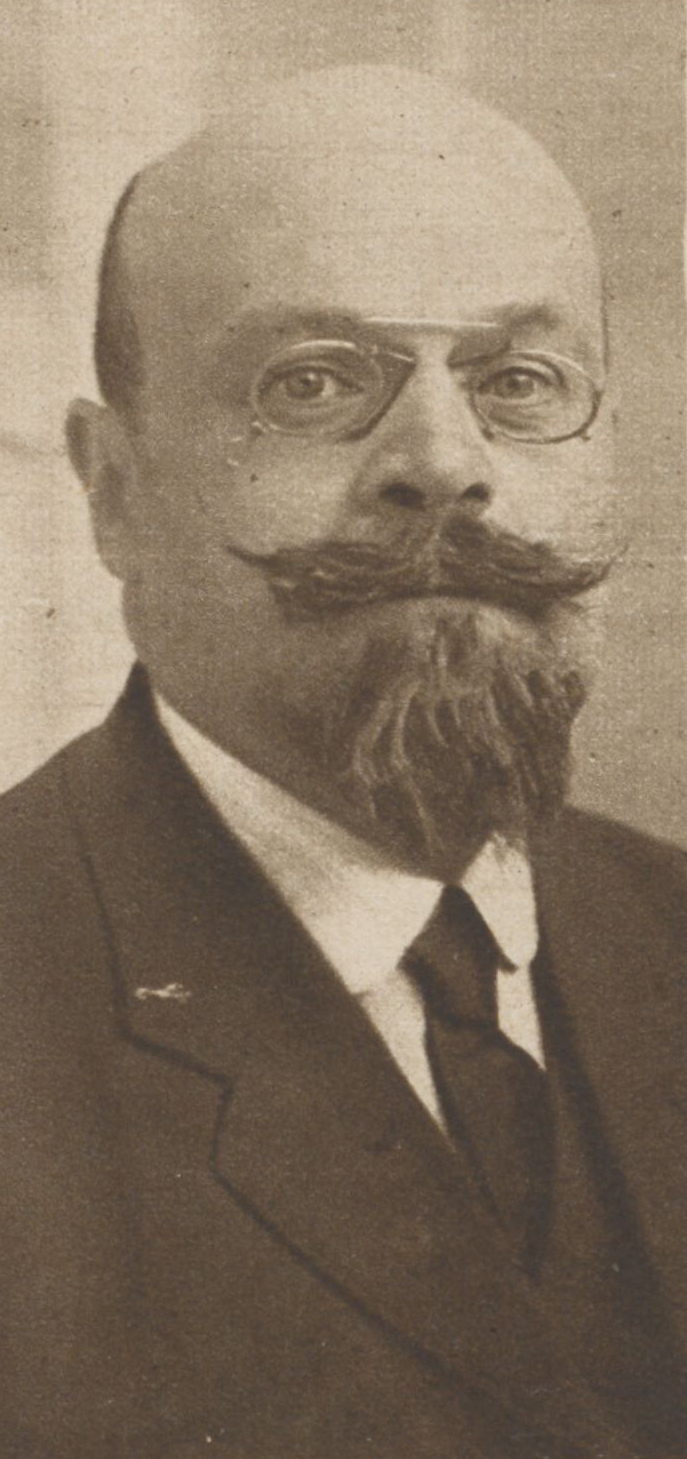
Amédée Thalamas

Despite Jaurès' warnings, several socialist deputies lent a sympathetic ear to the version defended by Louis Rouest, official representative of the Socialist Federation of Tunisia, who had taken up the cause for Couitéas. On July 12, 1911, the deputies Émile Driant, Joseph Lagrosillière, Albert Dalimier and fr:Amédée Thalamas spoke on his behalf in the Chamber of Deputies. The most noteworthy intervention was that of Thalamas:

“Mr. Couitéas arrived in Tunisia fifteen or eighteen years ago with a fortune of 2 million. He acquired, in a perfectly normal way, a land of some 60 thousand hectares. To have the complete and certain enjoyment of this property, he accepted a convention proposed by the Tunisian government, convention which took away 28,000 hectares and allotted them to the nomadic Arabs. The promises made to the Arabs have not been kept and the Arabs driven back from neighboring concessions have moved onto the land of Mr. Couitéas, who no longer has the enjoyment of the property he acquired legitimately acquired. He has seen his saw his outhouses burned and his agricultural machinery destroyed, and finally had to take refuge in Tunis and, which is quite extraordinary, no longer owns anything. This situation is unacceptable, gentlemen, and I immediately want to address the myth according to which Mr. Couitéas acquired these lands for a pittance. I have in my hands the receipts showing that he paid 743,500 francs for this property to the three co-owners who had acquired it from the descendants of the marabout to whom a decree of the bey had granted it in 1731"

The Socialist Federation of Tunisia was furious at these speeches because it had already alerted its Parisian colleagues to the facts. As a result, even before he returned to Tunisia, Rouest was expelled from the Socialist Party.

These interventions triggered debates through the press between supporters and opponents of Couitéas. His supporters argued that as his title deeds had been officially recognized, their cancellation by a beylical decree drafted by the Residents General was an abuse of power. His opponents focused on the implausibly low purchase value of the land, and the enormous rental income demanded on land the owner was claiming was deserted.

The debates in the Chamber of Deputies revealed that Couitéas had offered to sell his property to the Tunisian government for the sum of 2,500,000 francs. To justify this enormous asking price for a property purchased for a few tens of thousands of francs, Émile Driant gave a very long speech in the Chamber of Deputies on January 19, 1912 in which he detailed the sums disbursed both for the purchase of the domain and for its development.

The Couitéas affair was only one of the numerous scandals brought to light in speeches by deputies involving the spoliation of Tunisian properties for the benefit of private individuals. Responding to these accusations, Resident General Alapetite then attended the Chamber of Deputies in person and spoke on January 30 and 1 February 1912. He took the opportunity to justify his refusal to register the Couitéas henchir as well as the reasons which led him to quash the arbitration judgment. He detailed his doubts about the validity of the title deeds acquired by the businessman while denouncing his behavior towards the occupants of the domain. He finally justifies his decision to quash the arbitration judgment: "Suffice it to say that the French government, like the Tunisian government, was upset about the completely dangerous consequences for public order of this conflict and that in 1908, better informed, he gave the Tunisian government very precise instructions so that, henceforth, the latter took up the defense of the natives on the auctioneer Tabia-el-Houbira and lent them before the courts the assistance of his authority ”. He concluded by announcing that, although the case concerned a protectorate, it had been transferred for the attention of the Conseil d'État Council which would look into Couitéas' grievances.

== Arrêt Couitéas ==
The Conseil d’État considered Couitéas’ claim for compensation for damages caused by the refusal of the protectorate government to clear the occupants off his property despite the court injunction he had obtained. Couitéas estimated these damages to be 4,600,000 francs.

The judgment delivered on November 30, 1923 is still a legal precedent today, known as the “Couitéas judgment” (“arrêt Couitéas”). It established the legal “right to compensation for damage following the refusal of the government to lend the assistance of the police force for an expulsion”. At the same time, it also recognised that the government has the right to take exceptional measures which may infringe on private rights when the public interest is at stake and serious disturbances are feared. A second judgment dated December 2, 1927 required the State to pay Couitéas compensation of 1,500,000 francs.

After the death of Couitéas in 1928, his heirs Mme Boissiere and Jean Couitéas sought additional compensation, claiming that the judgment in 1927 only covered past losses, while the occupation of their land was continuing. Their case was eventually thrown out in November 1936.

== Impact of the case on tribal land rights in Tunisia ==
The Couitéas case illustrates the difficulties encountered by the government of the protectorate in reconciling the demands of French settlers and the rights of indigenous tribes. Some historians like Bashir Yazidi suggest that the decree of January 14, 1901 confirming the inalienability of collective lands and the right of tributes to have use of them, was a consequence of the Couitéas case.By recommending the registration of collective land, this decree made it possible to avoid new appropriations by speculators. However, by proclaiming that the tribes only had a "right of use" over these lands, some observers feared that the aim of the government was above all to recognize new unoccupied land which could be divided up and sold off at a later date.

Despite this decree the Tunisian tribes continued to lack any form of legal existence, while the property rights they claimed were collective rights. This is one of the reasons why the plaintiffs of the henchir of Tabia-el-Houbira were rejected by the court of Sousse in 1908. Collective lands were eventually properly defined and, in May 1922, the Department of Agriculture decided to regard as “tribal lands” all collective lands on the sole condition that “the State has the right to acquire it”.

Finally, the decree of December 30, 1935 granted the tribes a civil personality which allowed them to claim possession of lands on which they lived. Article 2 defined the notion of a tribe as "any administrative, family or other grouping of Muslim subjects, which justifies a right of collective enjoyment on one of the lands previously defined as such, whatever the origin of this right." In the following years, each tribe was endowed by individual decree with a civil personality. This sometimes had the consequence that they sold their land on, resulting in the break-up of the tribe.
