= Hippolyte Marié-Davy =

French chemist (1820–1893)

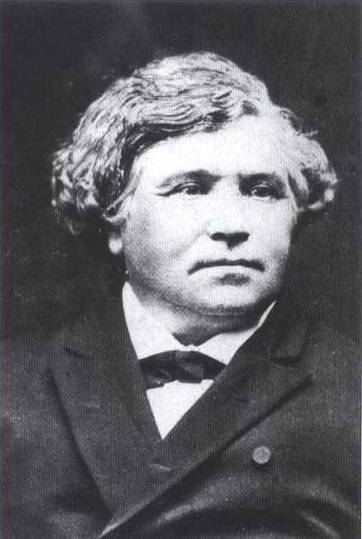
- Born: 28 April 1820; Clamecy, Nièvre, France
- Died: 26 July 1893 (aged 73)
- Education: École polytechnique, École normale supérieure
- Known for: Deputy Director of the Paris Observatory
- Scientific career
- Fields: Meteorology

Edme Hippolyte Marié-Davy (28 April 1820 – 26 July 1893) was a French chemist and inventor during the 19th century. He was born in Clamecy, Nièvre.

In 1854, he invented the first naval periscope, consisting of a vertical tube with two small mirrors fixed at each end at 45°. He also invented a mercury bisulfate battery that bears his name, "the Marie-Davy".

In 1854, Marié-Davy invented an electromagnetic motor. Based on it, he proposed a submarine with an electrically driven propeller. McClintock and Watson once planned to use the device on the Hunley. The engine was said to have the power of "a one-horse steam engine".

In the 1860s, he was Deputy Director of the Paris Observatory, in charge of meteorology. He devoted himself to the study of local thunderstorms, following the destructive storm of 14 November 1854, in the Crimean War.
