= Devay =

- Commune
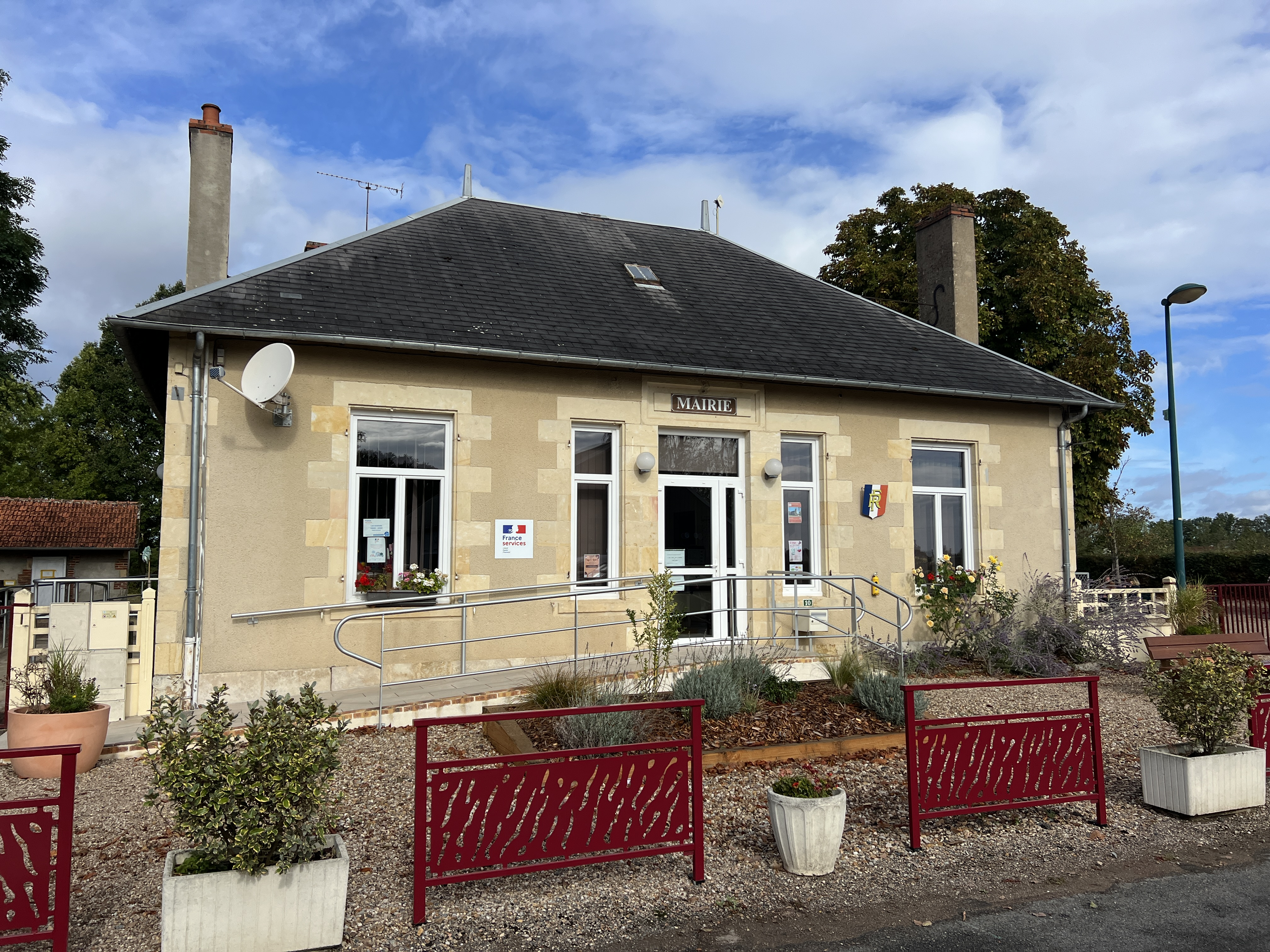
- Devay Town hall
- Location of Devay
- Location within France Location within Bourgogne-Franche-Comté
- Coordinates: 46°48′24″N 3°32′59″E
- Country: France
- Region: Bourgogne-Franche-Comté
- Department: Nièvre
- Arrondissement: Nevers
- Canton: Decize
- Intercommunality: Sud Nivernais

Government
  - Mayor (2020–2026): Christian Level
- Area^{1}: 12.08 km^{2} (4.66 sq mi)
- Highest elevation: 237 m (778 ft)
- Lowest elevation: 188 m (617 ft)
- Population (2023): 460
  - Density: 38/km^{2} (99/sq mi)
- Time zone: UTC+01:00 (CET)
  - Summer (DST): UTC+02:00 (CEST)
- INSEE/Postal code: 58096 /58300
- ^{1} French Land Register data, which excludes lakes, ponds, glaciers > 1 km^{2} (0.386 sq mi or 247 acres) and river estuaries.

Devay (French pronunciation: [dəvɛ]) is a commune in the Nièvre department in central France.

== See also ==
- Communes of the Nièvre department
