= Champvert =

- Commune
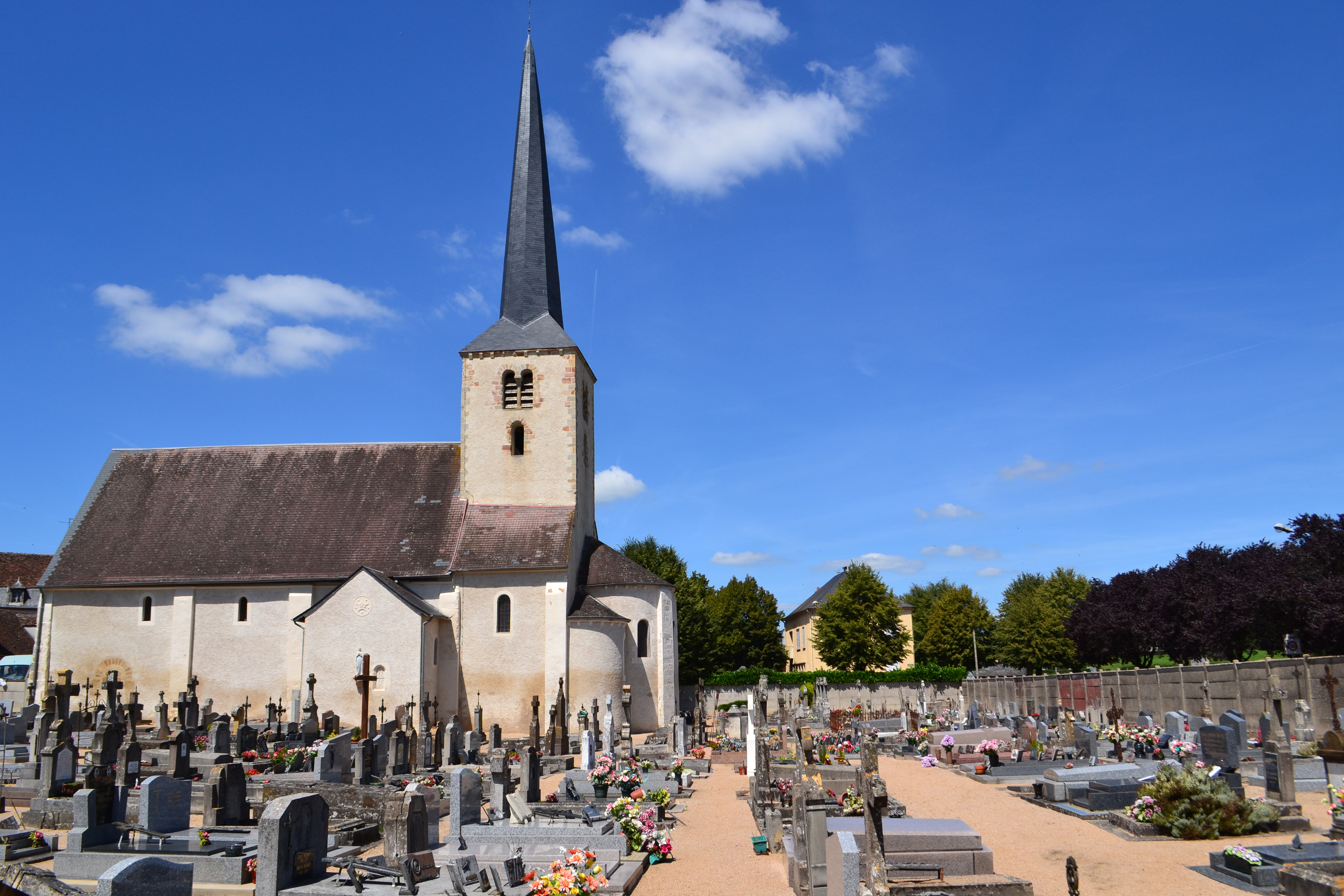
- The church in Champvert
- Location of Champvert
- Location within France Location within Bourgogne-Franche-Comté
- Coordinates: 46°50′28″N 3°30′43″E
- Country: France
- Region: Bourgogne-Franche-Comté
- Department: Nièvre
- Arrondissement: Nevers
- Canton: Decize
- Intercommunality: Sud Nivernais

Government
  - Mayor (2020–2026): Daniel Caillot
- Area^{1}: 46.12 km^{2} (17.81 sq mi)
- Highest elevation: 282 m (925 ft)
- Lowest elevation: 187 m (614 ft)
- Population (2023): 741
  - Density: 16.1/km^{2} (41.6/sq mi)
- Time zone: UTC+01:00 (CET)
  - Summer (DST): UTC+02:00 (CEST)
- INSEE/Postal code: 58055 /58300
- ^{1} French Land Register data, which excludes lakes, ponds, glaciers > 1 km^{2} (0.386 sq mi or 247 acres) and river estuaries.

Champvert (French pronunciation: [ʃɑ̃vɛʁ]) is a commune in the Nièvre department in central France.

== See also ==
- Communes of the Nièvre department
