= Théodore Tenaille-Saligny =

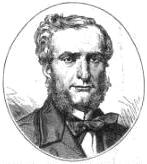
- Tenaille-Saligny from L'Illustration, journal universel, 11 February 1871

Prefect of Nièvre
- In office 26 February 1871 – 12 July 1871

Prefect of Charente-Inférieure
- In office 12 July 1871 – 26 May 1873

Prefect of Pas-de-Calais
- In office 21 March 1876 – 16 May 1877

Prefect of Haute-Garonne
- In office 15 December 1877 – February 1879

Senator for Nièvre
- In office 5 January 1879 – 4 January 1888

Personal details
- Born: Étienne Philippe Théodore Tenaille-Saligny; 22 February 1830 Clamecy, Nièvre, France
- Died: 24 March 1889 (aged 59) Clamecy, Nièvre, France
- Occupation: Lawyer, civil servant and politician

Théodore (Note: Étienne Philippe Théodore Tenaille-Saligny: The official site of the French Senate gives his common first name as Étienne. Other sources give it as Théodore, give his name in full, or simply call him M. Tenaille-Saligny. Contemporary official sources often give his name as M. Th. Tenaille-Saligny.) Tenaille-Saligny (22 February 1830 – 24 March 1889) was a French lawyer, civil servant and politician. He came from a prosperous family, was a convinced republican, but was a strong opponent of the Paris Commune. During the French Third Republic he served several times as a departmental prefect. He made a number of attempts in national elections before finally becoming Senator for Nièvre from 1879 to 1888.

== Early years (1830–1870) ==
Étienne Philippe Théodore Tenaille-Saligny was born on 22 February 1830 in Clamecy, Nièvre. His parents were Jean-Baptiste Etienne Marie Tenaille de Saligny (1792–1872) and Aglaé Moret de Parzy (1804–1866). He studied at the Paris Faculty of Law, and was licensed in 1850. He travelled in Italy, Germany and Scandinavia. On 11 November 1850 he became a lawyer at the Paris Court of Appeal. On 24 June 1856 in Paris he married Sidonie Arguiot (1837–1925). They had two daughters, Séverine (1860–1935) and Aglaë (1865–1950). He became a Freemason of the Grand Orient de France. He and his family later moved to the Château du parc Vauvert in Clamecy, former property of the Chabannes family.

On 24 July 1856 Tenaille-Saligny became a lawyer at the Council of State and the Court of Cassation, holding office until 1870. He was a convinced Republican and was involved in the "procès des 13" (trial of the thirteen) in August 1864. (Note: The Trial of the Thirteen was a trial of Garnier-Pagès and twelve others on charges of being part of an unauthorized association with more than 20 people. This referred to an electoral meeting arranged by the Republican Louis-Antoine Garnier-Pagès on 13 March 1861 and attended by the candidate Hippolyte Carnot and several deputies of the Corps législatif, which the police had broken up.) From 5 June 1867 he contributed to the Impartial of Nièvre. On 24 May 1869 he ran for election for the 3rd district of Nièvre as an independent candidate for the Corps législatif. He was defeated by M. Lepelletier d'Aunay.^{(fr)} In 1870 he resigned from the Court of Cassation.

== Prefect and candidate (1870–1879) ==
After the fall of the Second French Empire and declaration of the French Third Republic on 4 September 1870 Tenaille-Saligny was named mayor of the 1st arrondissement of Paris by Léon Gambetta, and was confirmed in this post in November 1870. He was a follower of the political views of Adolphe Thiers, and ran on his platform for election for Nièvre for the National Assembly on 8 February 1871, but was defeated.

On 26 February 1871 Tenaille-Saligny was named Prefect of Nièvre. During his administration there were many lawsuits against Republicans. He ordered the arrest of 18 citizens at Cosne, who were taken to the Loiret Assize Court on charges of conspiracy in favor of the Paris Commune and given sentences ranging from six months to fifteen years in prison. On 12 July 1871 Tenaille-Saligny was appointed Prefect of Charente-Inférieure. When Thiers lost power on 24 May 1873 Tenaille-Saligny resigned from his position of prefect and returned to Paris. He was elected Paris municipal councilor for St Germain l'Auxerrois on 29 November 1874 and held office until he resigned on 20 March 1876. On 30 January 1876 he ran unsuccessfully for the Senate in Nièvre. On 20 February 1876 he ran for the Chamber of Deputies for Clamecy, but was again defeated by M. Lepelletier d'Aunay.

On 21 March 1876 Tenaille-Saligny was appointed Prefect of Pas-de-Calais. He appointed Gabriel Alapetite his chef de cabinet. Gabriel Alapetite had started practice as a lawyer in 1873 with Tenaille-Saligny as his political mentor. Tenaille-Saligny lost office in the 16 May 1877 crisis. He was made a Knight of the Legion of Honour on 14 August 1876. He was prefect of Haute-Garonne from 18 December 1877 until his resignation on 16 February 1879. Alapetite was again his chef de cabinet in Haute-Garonne.

== Senator and death (1879–1889) ==
On 5 January 1879 Tenaille-Saligny was elected Senator for Nièvre and joined the Republican Left group. He was also elected Nièvre general councilor for the canton of Varzy, holding office from January 1881 to August 1886. He participated in various debates in the Senate. The Merchant Shipping Bill of 1880 proposed a bounty payable to shipowners in recognition of their contribution to training seamen for the navy, with the bounty reduced by half for foreign-built vessels purchased after the bill came into effect. Tenailly Saligny proposed that ships that had been ordered and were under construction in foreign shipyards should be exempt, but this was rejected. In July 1883 he was rapporteur of the law for reform of the judiciary. In August 1885 he proposed an amendment to the voting list act. He voted for restoration of divorce, for credits for the Tonkin Campaign of 1883–86, and for the 22 June 1886 law exiling the princes^{(fr)}.

Tenaille-Saligny ran for reelection on 8 January 1888, refused to concede victory to the Radical list, but was eventually defeated in the third round. Théodore Tenaille-Saligny died in Clamecy on 24 March 1889. On 3 July 1889 Gabriel Alapetite married his daughter, Magdeleine Louise Etiennette Tenaille-Saligny (1867–1943).

== Publications ==
Publications by Théodore Tenaille-Saligny include:

- M. Tenaille-Saligny, avocat au Conseil d'Etat et à la Cour de cassation (1862), Le Code pénal de Norwége, Paris: Auguste Durand, pp. 20 pages
- M. Tenaille-Saligny (1868), Mémoire des griefs de Château-Chinon au sujet du tracé du chemin de fer, Nevers: chez Bégat, pp. 40 pages
- M. Tenaille-Saligny, ancien maire du premier arrondissement de Paris, etc. (1874), La République et le Gouvernement de combat, Paris: A. Le Chevalier, pp. 58 pages

== Sources ==
- Almanach national: annuaire officiel de la République française (in French), Berger-Levrault et cie., 1872
- André-Pasquet, E. (1862), De la fixation du nombre des députés au Corps législatif. Consultation, adhésions et documents divers (in French)
- Berthier de Grandry, Frédéric de (2004), La famille d'Achille Tenaille de Vaulabelle (1799-1879): un ministre pionnier de l'éducation nationale (in French), F. de Berthier de Grandry, ISBN 978-2-9513699-2-4
- Bulletin des lois de la Republique Francaise (in French), Impr. Nationale des Lois, 1874
- Favre, Jules (1882), Plaidoyers politiques et judiciaires (in French), E. Plon
- Gabriel Alapetite (1854–1932) (in French), BnF: Bibliotheque nationale de France
- Macfie, Robert Andrew (1881), Cries, in a Crisis, for Statesmanship Popular and Patriotic to Test and Contest Free-trade in Our Manufactures, Shammed in Concessive Treaties, Shackled with Repressive Duties, and Shattered by Aggressive Bounties, Through which Deviations from Le Libre Travail Et la Libre Échange British Aids are Unduly Promoting Foreign Aims Upon Our Industries and Shipping: ...the Empire and Emigration, Parliament and Its Procedure...With an Appendix Containing the French Treaty, the French Shipping Bounty Scheme, and Many Illustrative Extracts, E. Stanford
- Michel, Joël (July–September 1993), "Ordre public et agitation ouvrière: l'habileté du préfet Alapetite", Le Mouvement Social (in French) (164), Editions l'Atelier on behalf of Association Le Mouvement Social: 7–15, doi:10.2307/3779155, JSTOR 3779155
- Parent, Jean-Christian, "Alapetite Gabriel Ferdinand", Famille Parent-Cadart-Ponsar (in French)
- Pierfit, "Théodore TENAILLE de SALIGNY", geneanet (in French)
- Résumé des Services M Apetite (Gabriel, Ferdinand) (in French), Préfecture du Pas-de-Calais – via Leonore
- Robert, Adolphe; Cougny, Gaston, eds. (1889–1891), "TENAILLE-SALIGNY (ETIENNE-PHILIPPE-THÉODORE)", Dictionnaire des parlementaires français... : depuis le 1er mai 1789 jusqu'au 1er mai 1889 (in French), Edgar Bourloton
- Société nivernaise ... (1880), Bulletin de la Société nivernaise des lettres, sciences et arts: Table des pix premiers volumes (in French), Mazeron
- TENAILLE-SALIGNY Etienne (in French), Sénat de France
