= Canton of Decize =

Coordinates: 46.83°N 3.46°E

The canton of Decize is an administrative division of the Nièvre department, central France. Its borders were modified at the French canton reorganisation which came into effect in March 2015. Its seat is in Decize.

It consists of the following communes:

1. Champvert
2. Cossaye
3. Decize
4. Devay
5. Lamenay-sur-Loire
6. Lucenay-lès-Aix
7. Saint-Germain-Chassenay
8. Saint-Léger-des-Vignes
9. Verneuil
