= Lamenay-sur-Loire =

- Commune
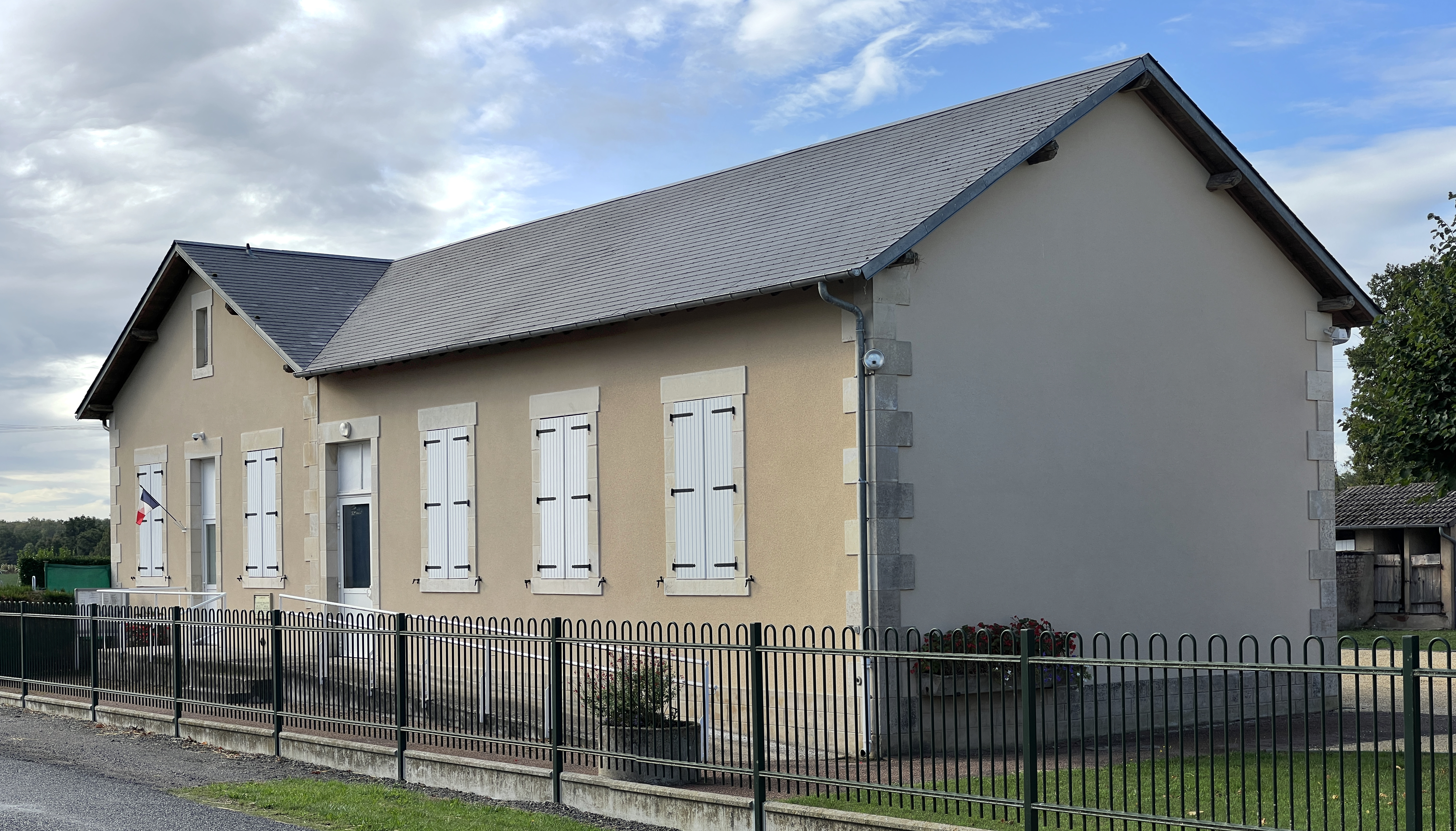
- Lamenay-sur-Loire Town hall
- Location of Lamenay-sur-Loire
- Location within France Location within Bourgogne-Franche-Comté
- Coordinates: 46°45′46″N 3°33′47″E
- Country: France
- Region: Bourgogne-Franche-Comté
- Department: Nièvre
- Arrondissement: Nevers
- Canton: Decize

Government
  - Mayor (2020–2026): Guy Mazoire
- Area^{1}: 11.53 km^{2} (4.45 sq mi)
- Highest elevation: 222 m (728 ft)
- Lowest elevation: 194 m (636 ft)
- Population (2023): 64
  - Density: 5.6/km^{2} (14/sq mi)
- Time zone: UTC+01:00 (CET)
  - Summer (DST): UTC+02:00 (CEST)
- INSEE/Postal code: 58137 /58300
- ^{1} French Land Register data, which excludes lakes, ponds, glaciers > 1 km^{2} (0.386 sq mi or 247 acres) and river estuaries.

Lamenay-sur-Loire (French pronunciation: [lamnɛ syʁ lwaʁ], literally Lamenay on Loire) is a commune in the Nièvre department in central France.

== See also ==
- Communes of the Nièvre department
