= Châtel-Censoir =

- Commune
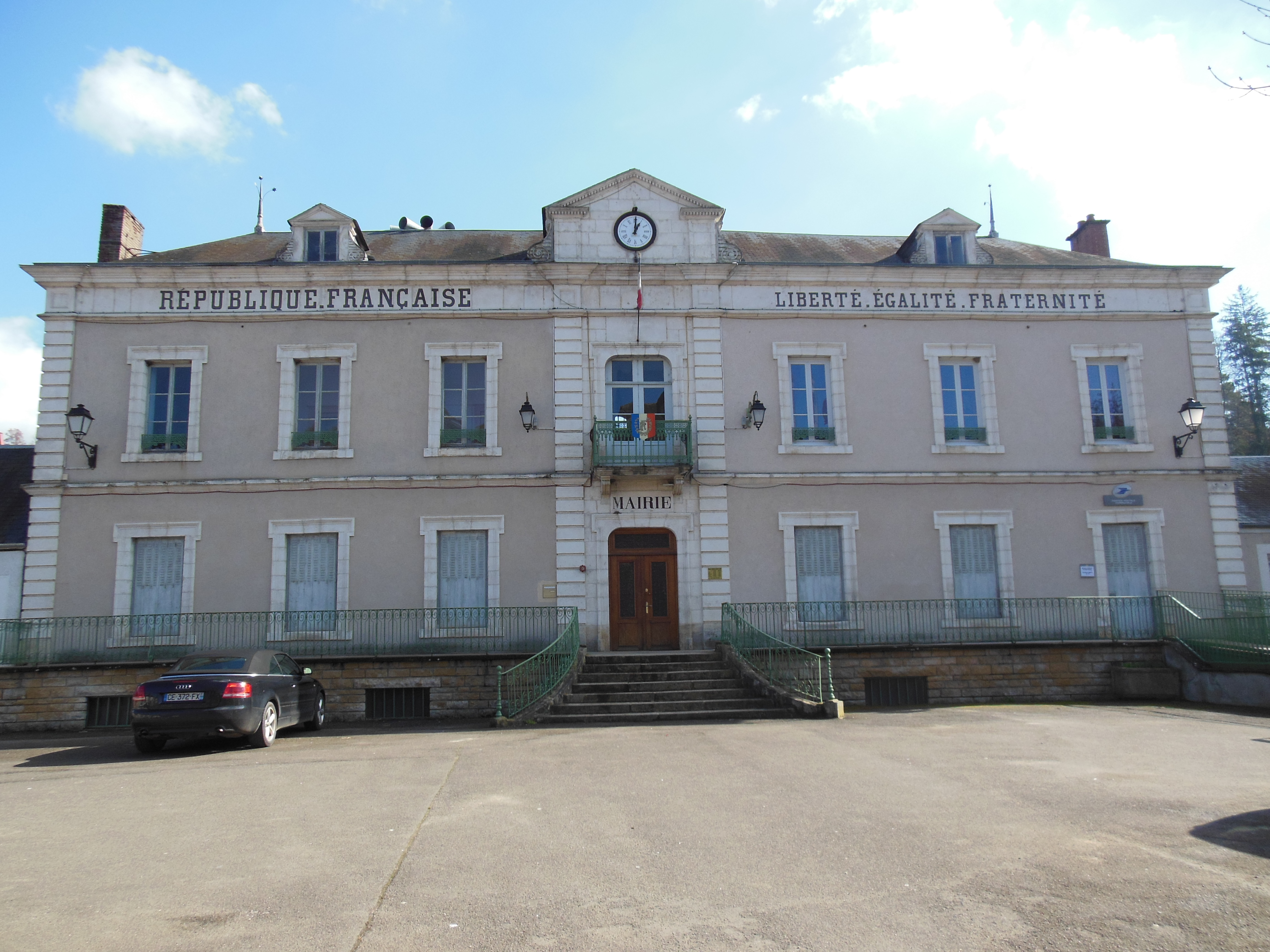
- The town hall in Châtel-Censoir

- Coat of arms
- Location of Châtel-Censoir
- Location within France Location within Bourgogne-Franche-Comté
- Coordinates: 47°31′57″N 3°38′05″E
- Country: France
- Region: Bourgogne-Franche-Comté
- Department: Yonne
- Arrondissement: Avallon
- Canton: Joux-la-Ville

Government
  - Mayor (2020–2026): Olivier Maguet
- Area^{1}: 24.62 km^{2} (9.51 sq mi)
- Highest elevation: 283 m (928 ft)
- Lowest elevation: 127 m (417 ft)
- Population (2023): 561
  - Density: 22.8/km^{2} (59.0/sq mi)
- Time zone: UTC+01:00 (CET)
  - Summer (DST): UTC+02:00 (CEST)
- INSEE/Postal code: 89091 /89660
- ^{1} French Land Register data, which excludes lakes, ponds, glaciers > 1 km^{2} (0.386 sq mi or 247 acres) and river estuaries.

Châtel-Censoir (French pronunciation: [ʃɑtɛl sɑ̃swaʁ]) is a commune in the Yonne department in Bourgogne-Franche-Comté in north-central France. It is on the Canal du Nivernais which parallels the non-navigable section of the Yonne River.

== See also ==
- Communes of the Yonne department
