= Montreuillon =

- Commune
- Former centre of the Eurozone
- Location of Montreuillon
- Location within France Location within Bourgogne-Franche-Comté
- Coordinates: 47°10′29″N 3°47′20″E
- Country: France
- Region: Bourgogne-Franche-Comté
- Department: Nièvre
- Arrondissement: Clamecy
- Canton: Château-Chinon

Government
  - Mayor (2021–2026): Alexandre Couvenant
- Area^{1}: 35.55 km^{2} (13.73 sq mi)
- Highest elevation: 426 m (1,398 ft)
- Lowest elevation: 229 m (751 ft)
- Population (2023): 243
  - Density: 6.84/km^{2} (17.7/sq mi)
- Time zone: UTC+01:00 (CET)
  - Summer (DST): UTC+02:00 (CEST)
- INSEE/Postal code: 58179 /58800
- ^{1} French Land Register data, which excludes lakes, ponds, glaciers > 1 km^{2} (0.386 sq mi or 247 acres) and river estuaries.

Montreuillon Aqueduct

Montreuillon (French pronunciation: [mɔ̃tʁœjɔ̃]) is a commune in the Nièvre department in central France.

== Eurozone ==
Montreuillon was the official centre of the Eurozone between 2001 and 2007.

== Canal du Nivernais ==
It is the site of an impressive aqueduct over which runs the feeder canal linking the Pannecière reservoir with the Canal du Nivernais.

== See also ==
- Communes of the Nièvre department
- Parc naturel régional du Morvan
