= Cossaye =

- Commune
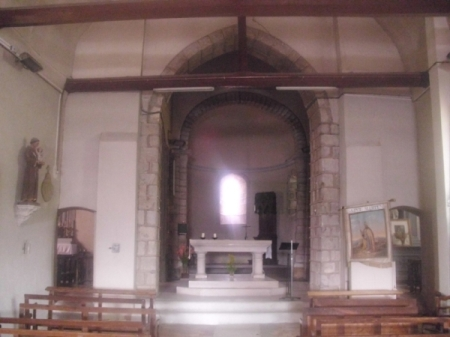
- The interior of the church in Cossaye
- Location of Cossaye
- Location within France Location within Bourgogne-Franche-Comté
- Coordinates: 46°44′58″N 3°29′07″E
- Country: France
- Region: Bourgogne-Franche-Comté
- Department: Nièvre
- Arrondissement: Nevers
- Canton: Decize

Government
  - Mayor (2020–2026): Eric Venuat
- Area^{1}: 51.17 km^{2} (19.76 sq mi)
- Highest elevation: 247 m (810 ft)
- Lowest elevation: 190 m (620 ft)
- Population (2023): 652
  - Density: 12.7/km^{2} (33.0/sq mi)
- Time zone: UTC+01:00 (CET)
  - Summer (DST): UTC+02:00 (CEST)
- INSEE/Postal code: 58087 /58300
- ^{1} French Land Register data, which excludes lakes, ponds, glaciers > 1 km^{2} (0.386 sq mi or 247 acres) and river estuaries.

Cossaye is a commune in the Nièvre department in central France.

== See also ==
- Communes of the Nièvre department
