= Lucenay-lès-Aix =

- Commune
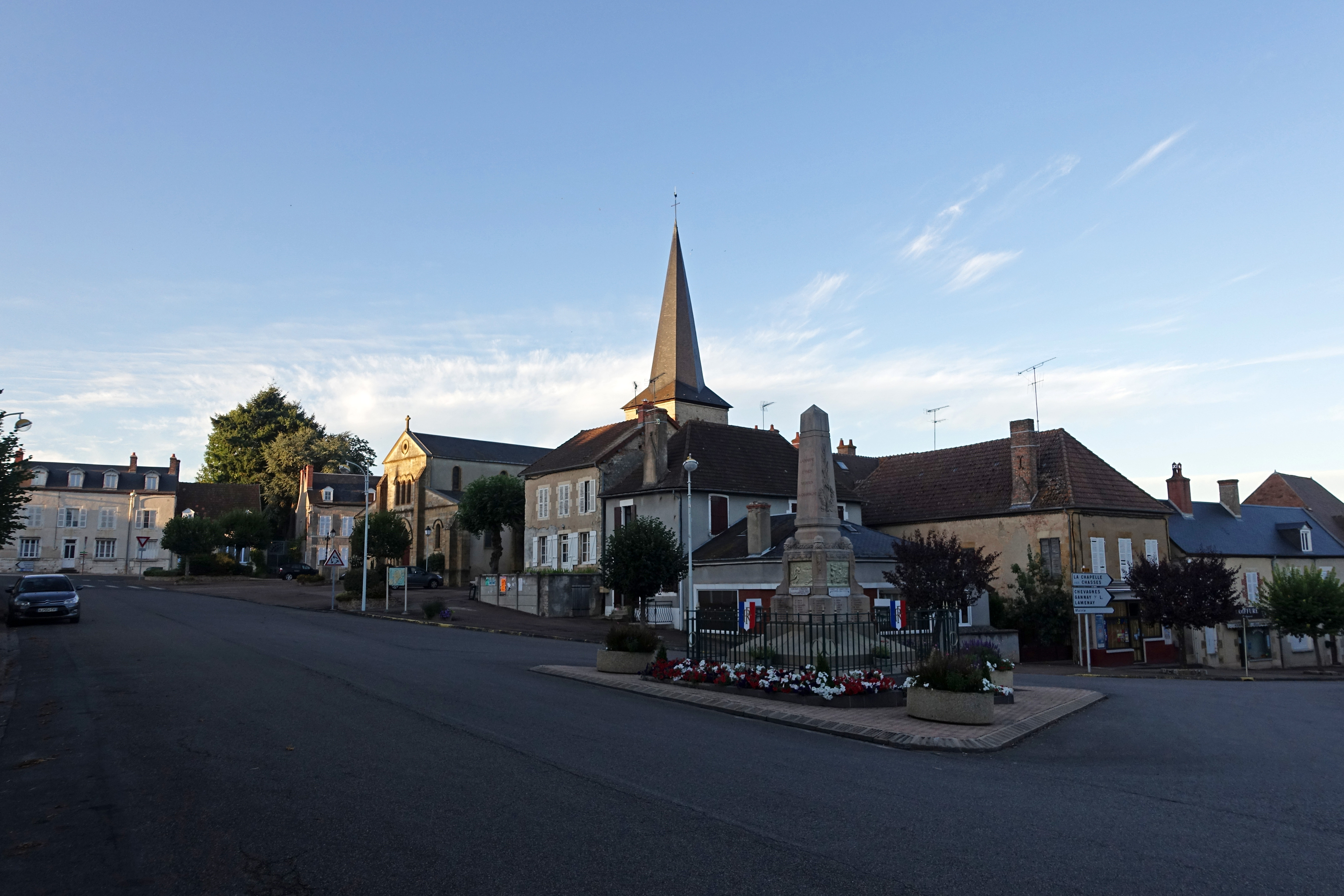
- View of Lucenay-lès-Aix

- Coat of arms
- Location of Lucenay-lès-Aix
- Location within France Location within Bourgogne-Franche-Comté
- Coordinates: 46°42′16″N 3°29′05″E
- Country: France
- Region: Bourgogne-Franche-Comté
- Department: Nièvre
- Arrondissement: Nevers
- Canton: Decize

Government
  - Mayor (2020–2026): Jean-Yves Forest
- Area^{1}: 55.05 km^{2} (21.25 sq mi)
- Highest elevation: 242 m (794 ft)
- Lowest elevation: 202 m (663 ft)
- Population (2023): 936
  - Density: 17.0/km^{2} (44.0/sq mi)
- Time zone: UTC+01:00 (CET)
  - Summer (DST): UTC+02:00 (CEST)
- INSEE/Postal code: 58146 /58380
- ^{1} French Land Register data, which excludes lakes, ponds, glaciers > 1 km^{2} (0.386 sq mi or 247 acres) and river estuaries.

Lucenay-lès-Aix is a commune in the Nièvre department in central France.

== Population ==
Historical population
Year	Pop.	±% p.a.
1968	1,554	—
1975	1,419	−1.29%
1982	1,218	−2.16%
1990	1,139	−0.83%
1999	1,048	−0.92%
2007	1,050	+0.02%
2012	1,017	−0.64%
2017	982	−0.70%
2023	936	−0.80%
Source: INSEE

== See also ==
- Communes of the Nièvre department
