= Saint-Léger-des-Vignes =

- Commune
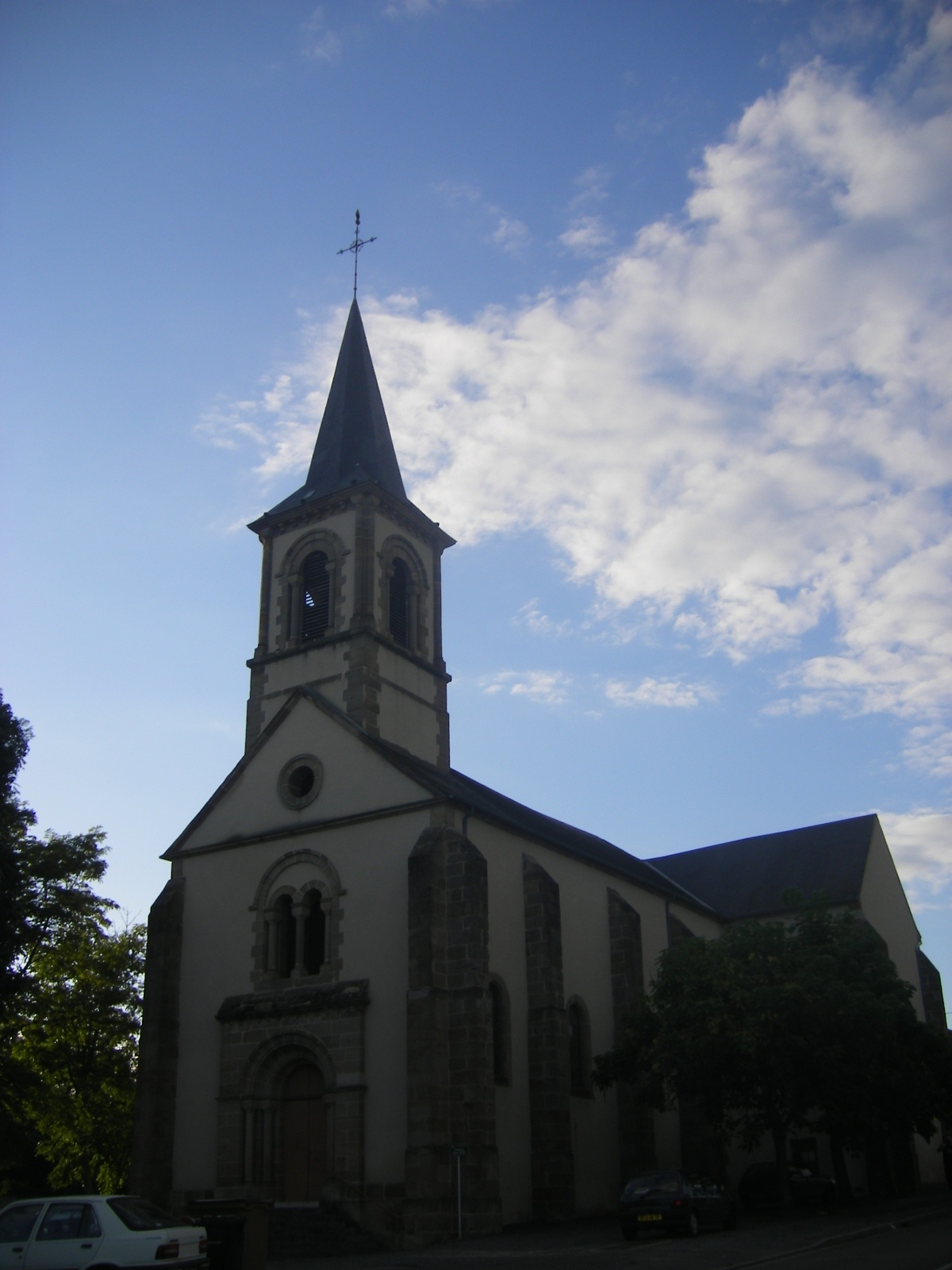
- The church in Saint-Léger-des-Vignes
- Location of Saint-Léger-des-Vignes
- Location within France Location within Bourgogne-Franche-Comté
- Coordinates: 46°50′27″N 3°27′19″E
- Country: France
- Region: Bourgogne-Franche-Comté
- Department: Nièvre
- Arrondissement: Nevers
- Canton: Decize

Government
  - Mayor (2020–2026): Christophe Fragny
- Area^{1}: 9.18 km^{2} (3.54 sq mi)
- Highest elevation: 265 m (869 ft)
- Lowest elevation: 186 m (610 ft)
- Population (2023): 1,646
  - Density: 179/km^{2} (464/sq mi)
- Time zone: UTC+01:00 (CET)
  - Summer (DST): UTC+02:00 (CEST)
- INSEE/Postal code: 58250 /58300
- ^{1} French Land Register data, which excludes lakes, ponds, glaciers > 1 km^{2} (0.386 sq mi or 247 acres) and river estuaries.

Saint-Léger-des-Vignes (French pronunciation: [sɛ̃ leʒe de viɲ]) is a commune in the department of the Nièvre, Bourgogne-Franche-Comté, in central France.

== Geography ==
Saint-Léger-des-Vignes is situated in the South of the Nièvre, on the road D981. It is the beginning point of the Canal du Nivernais and situated on the edge of the river Loire. At the confluence of the Loire, the Aron and at the junction of the Canal du Nivernais and the Canal latéral à la Loire, it is a real crossroads of waterways. The hills of Saint-Léger-des-Vignes are fully facing south. This is the place where vines were planted which gave the name to the village.

== History ==
=== The name ===
Over the centuries, Saint-Léger-des-Vignes had several names:

- Sanctus Léodgarius in 1152
- Sancti Léodgarius in Vinéïs in 1396
- Saint Ligier des Vignes in 1457
- Saint Lige les Vignes lès Decize in 1689

=== The glass factories ===
On 29 May 1724, Bernard Borniol built his glass factory on the site of Saint-Léger-des-Vignes, which was called Desize at this time. It closed much later in 1840. However, a second glass factory was created where we can currently find the Fresneau Stadium. Here we produced bottles until its shutting down, 5 December 1931.

=== The rubber factory ===
The factory located in Decize (the neighbouring town) was very beneficial for Saint-Léger-des-Vignes. The Kleber factory (which is nowadays Anvis) was opened in 1942. It established the remarkable Fresneau Center where the old glass factory used to be before the 1930s.

== Demography ==
As of 2023, the population of the commune was 1,646.

== Sports ==
Saint-Léger-des-Vignes has an important sports complex, the Fresneau Center where rugby is played in particular. The sports facilities are sometimes praised as the best of the whole Nièvre. Grandstands with a seating capacity of 3,000 spectators (including 300 covered) were built in 1951. Several sports are practiced under the aegis of Esperance Saint-Léger sports association (ESL) (athletics, boxing, canoe-kayak, climbing, gymnastics, judo, table tennis...) but the rugby XV is the most popular. The team which is in factory's colors (orange and blue), rose the level "National 3" in the 1990s and came close to the level "National 2".

== Personalities associated with the commune ==
- Jean-Marie Clamamus (1879-1973), politician, born in Saint-Léger-des-Vignes
- Claude de Burine (1931-2005), poet born in Saint-Léger-des-Vignes
- Hubert Védrine (born in 1947), politician, town councillor in Saint-Léger-des-Vignes from 1977 to 1995.
- Père Glencross

== See also ==
- Communes of the Nièvre department
