= Saint-Germain-Chassenay =

- Commune
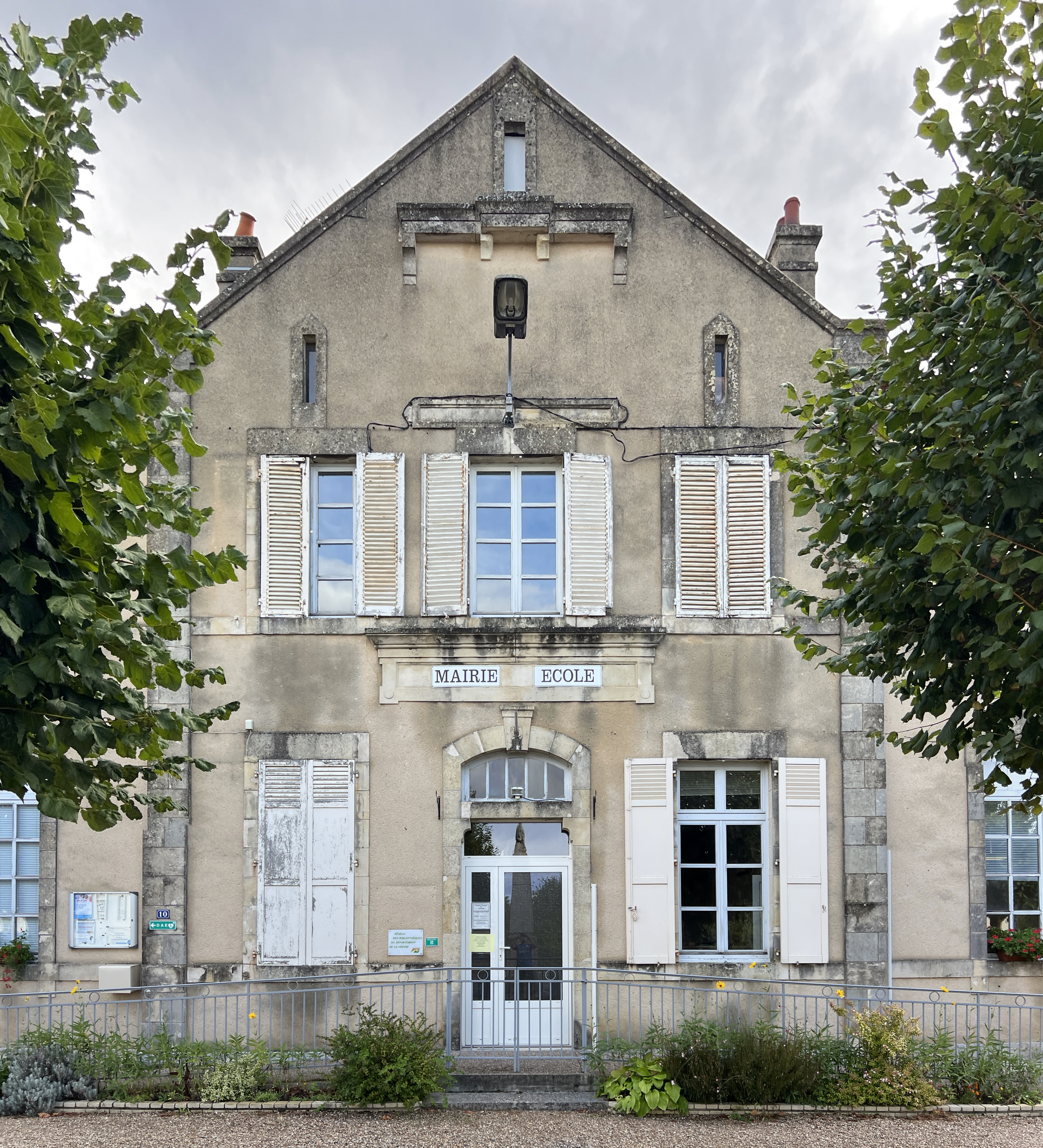
- Saint-Germain-Chassenay Town hall
- Location of Saint-Germain-Chassenay
- Location within France Location within Bourgogne-Franche-Comté
- Coordinates: 46°46′36″N 3°23′36″E
- Country: France
- Region: Bourgogne-Franche-Comté
- Department: Nièvre
- Arrondissement: Nevers
- Canton: Decize
- Intercommunality: Sud Nivernais

Government
  - Mayor (2020–2026): François Schwarz
- Area^{1}: 24.03 km^{2} (9.28 sq mi)
- Highest elevation: 246 m (807 ft)
- Lowest elevation: 185 m (607 ft)
- Population (2023): 306
  - Density: 12.7/km^{2} (33.0/sq mi)
- Time zone: UTC+01:00 (CET)
  - Summer (DST): UTC+02:00 (CEST)
- INSEE/Postal code: 58241 /58300
- ^{1} French Land Register data, which excludes lakes, ponds, glaciers > 1 km^{2} (0.386 sq mi or 247 acres) and river estuaries.

Saint-Germain-Chassenay (French pronunciation: [sɛ̃ ʒɛʁmɛ̃ ʃasnɛ]) is a commune in the Nièvre department in central France.

== See also ==
- Communes of the Nièvre department
