= Yonne (river) =

River in France

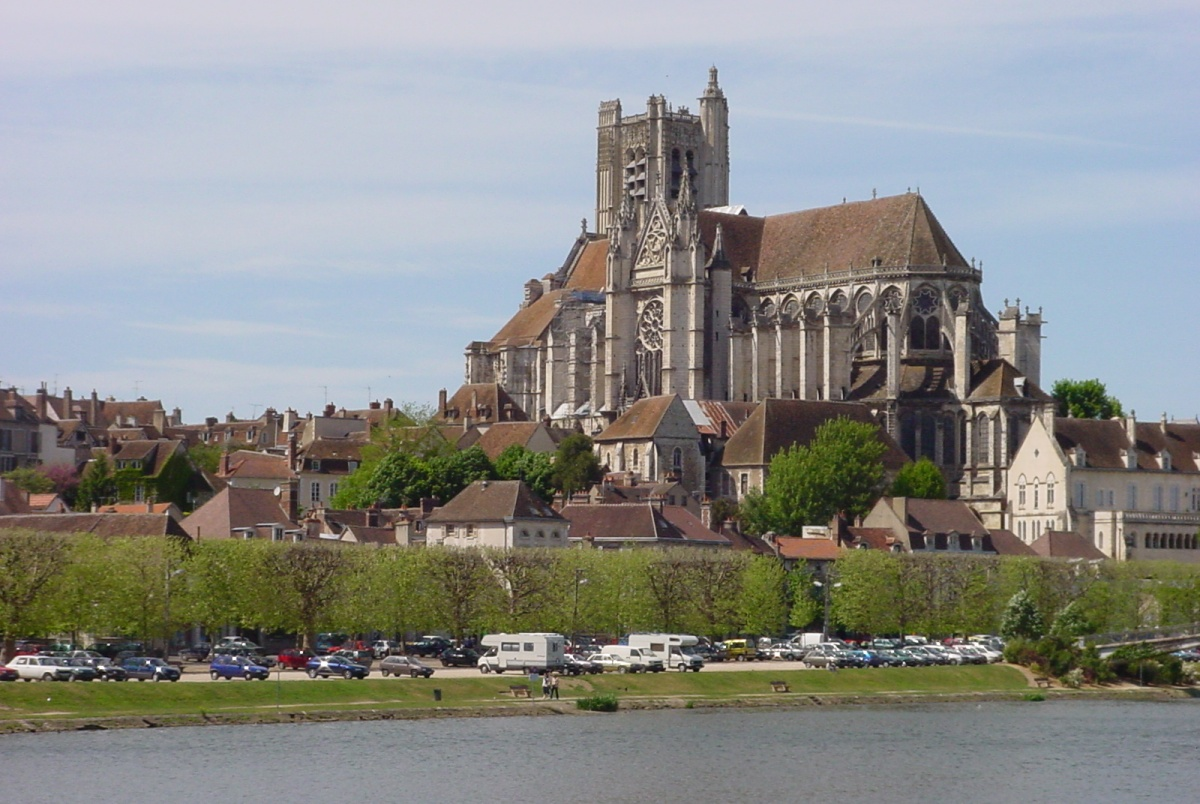
- The Yonne in Auxerre

Location
- Country: France

Physical characteristics
- Source
  - location: Morvan
  - elevation: 730 m (2,400 ft)
- Mouth
  - location: Seine
  - coordinates: 48°23′15″N 2°57′30″E
- Length: 292 km (181 mi)
- Basin size: 10,887 km^{2} (4,203 mi^{2})
- Discharge
  - average: 95 m^{3}/s (3,400 cu ft/s)

Basin features
- Progression: Seine→ English Channel

The Yonne (French: [jɔn]) is a river in France, a left-bank tributary of the Seine. It is 292 km (181 mi) long. The river gives its name to the Yonne département. It rises in the Nièvre département, in the Morvan hills near Château-Chinon. It flows into the river Seine at Montereau-Fault-Yonne.

The Yonne flows through the following départements and towns:

- Nièvre: Château-Chinon, Clamecy
- Yonne: Auxerre, Migennes, Joigny, Villeneuve-sur-Yonne, Sens
- Seine-et-Marne: Montereau-Fault-Yonne

The main tributaries of the Yonne are the Vanne, the Armançon, the Serein and the Cure.

== History ==
The river was historically used for flottage, or the floating of rafts of timber from the Morvan forest to serve the needs of the capital, Paris. It was bypassed as a rafting waterway by the Canal du Nivernais in 1841, from near its source at Corbigny down to Auxerre.

In 1834 the engineer Charles Poirée had successfully tested his design for a needle weir, and this construction technique was adopted on the river Yonne. The first lock was built in the 1840s, the others from 1861. The locks were enlarged to Freycinet standards in the late 19th century, then again to their current dimensions after World War II.

== Navigation ==
The navigable river Yonne extends for 108 km (67 mi), from Auxerre (junction with the Canal du Nivernais) to the confluence with the Seine. At Laroche-Migennes (PK 23), the Yonne connects with the Canal de Bourgogne. There are 9 locks on the river on the first section to Laroche-Migennes, the remaining 17 on the more gently-sloping lower course of the river.

== See also ==
- Rivers of France
- List of canals in France
