= Nivernais Canal =

Canal in central France

Coordinates: 47°40′N 3°40′E

Canal du Nivernais
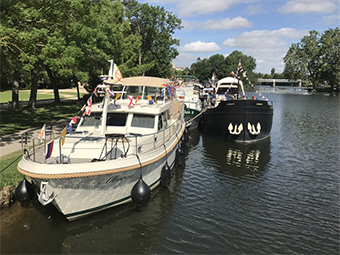
- Boats moored on the last pound of the Canal du Nivernais (a section in the river Yonne) in Auxerre

Specifications
- Length: 174 km
- Maximum boat length: 30.15 m (98.9 ft)
- Maximum boat beam: 5.10 m (16.7 ft)
- Locks: 112
- Maximum height above sea level: 262 m (860 ft)

History
- Current owner: Voies Navigables de France
- Construction began: 1784
- Date completed: 1841

Geography
- Start point: Saint-Léger-des-Vignes
- End point: Auxerre
- Connects to: Loire, Canal latéral à la Loire, Yonne

The Canal du Nivernais (French pronunciation: [kanal dy nivɛʁnɛ]) links the Loire with the Seine, following approximately the course of the river Yonne in a south to north direction. It first climbs northeast and north to cross the Morvan watershed, then roughly follows the course of the Yonne. Beginning on the Loire in the village of Saint-Léger-des-Vignes, it reaches its half-way point at the town of Clamecy and finishes at Auxerre on the Yonne.

The canal is 174 km (108 mi) long and has 112 locks. It is fed at its summit at Port Brûlé by a feeder canal from the Lac de Pannecière reservoir, including an elegant aqueduct at Montreuillon. In its northerly course it is regularly fed by the Yonne and on the southern slope by the Aron. The summit level pound also comprises three tunnels. Although the feeder canal arrives at Port Brûlé, the top of the canal is generally considered to be at Baye at the southern end of the tunnels.

== History ==
Construction of the canal began in 1784, initially to aid the flottage (floating) of timber rafts from the forests of the Morvan national park to Paris, via Clamecy and Auxerre. However, in reality, the canal was quickly established as an important communication route, carrying timber, building stone, grain and wine out of the region, and bringing in coal. It contributed significantly to the economic development of the Nièvre, particularly the area known as the 'Valleys of the Yonne' of which the small town of Clamecy is the capital, and also to the quarries at Chevroches and Dornecy. The canal du Nivernais importance in this respect, faded with the arrival of the railway in the 19th century.

== Boating and tourism ==
Today, the canal is exclusively reserved for navigation in recreational craft. A number of boat hire companies have bases on the canal at Auxerre, Vermenton on the short branch, Châtel-Censoir, Coulanges-sur-Yonne, Tannay, Marigny-sur-Yonne, Corbigny, Baye, Châtillon-en-Bazois and Decize. There are also a number of hotel barges, cruising between Auxerre and Clamecy and beyond.

== Sights ==
The majority of tourists begin their cruise at the historic city of Auxerre after which, the canal winds south through the department of Yonne countryside past a number of small, picturesque villages and hamlets, departing from and rejoining the river Yonne on this ascending leg. Notable villages include Bailly with its famous wine cellars situated in caves, Vincelles and the nearby wine village of Irancy, Cravant, Mailly-la-Ville, Mailly-le-Château, Châtel-Censoir and Coulanges-sur-Yonne. Amongst the most spectacular sites are the Rochers du Saussois (photo), a series of 50 metre-high limestone cliffs beside the river. Shortly after Coulanges, the canal leaves the department of the Yonne and enters the department of the Nièvre.

At roughly the half-way point, the canal passes through a landscape of limestone outcrops and undulating farmland until arriving at the medieval town of Clamecy. The Romain Rolland Museum in Clamecy houses a permanent exhibition dedicated to the former industrial and communicatory importance of the canal. Those interested in the history of the canal will be able to visit the now unused parts which were replaced by a stretch of the river.

After Clamecy boats cease to navigate on the Yonne and it is canal only up to the summit. The Canal continues to rise, passing through the countryside of the valleys of the Yonne, through more villages and hamlets including Corbigny, the only sizable town for some distance, the last 12 kilometres featuring 28 locks including the 16 locks of the Sardy flight (échelle de Sardy) which lead to the summit at Baye, then Châtillon-en-Bazois with its château overlooking the port and Cercy-la-Tour and its giant Madonna statue, the last town before the canal ends at Saint-Léger-des-Vignes adjacent to Decize.

== See also ==
- List of canals in France
