= Clamecy, Nièvre =

Clamecy
- Subprefecture and commune
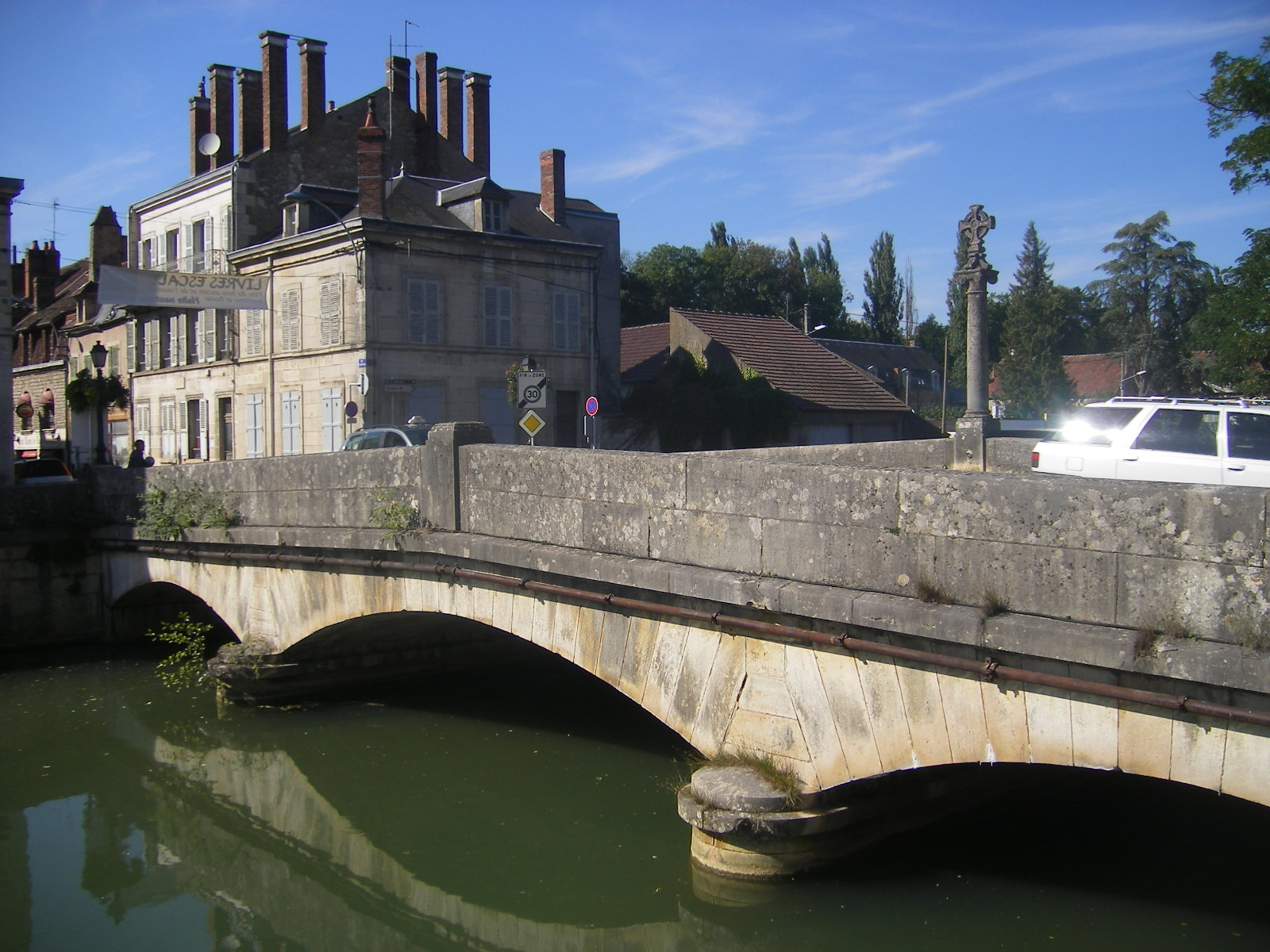
- Bridge over the Beuvron

- Coat of arms
- Location of Clamecy
- Location within France Location within Bourgogne-Franche-Comté
- Coordinates: 47°27′39″N 3°31′13″E
- Country: France
- Region: Bourgogne-Franche-Comté
- Department: Nièvre
- Arrondissement: Clamecy
- Canton: Clamecy
- Intercommunality: Haut Nivernais-Val d'Yonne

Government
  - Mayor (2020–2026): Nicolas Bourdoune
- Area^{1}: 30.26 km^{2} (11.68 sq mi)
- Elevation: 160 m (520 ft)
- Highest elevation: 281 m (922 ft)
- Lowest elevation: 142 m (466 ft)
- Population (2023): 3,544
  - Density: 117.1/km^{2} (303.3/sq mi)
- Time zone: UTC+01:00 (CET)
  - Summer (DST): UTC+02:00 (CEST)
- INSEE/Postal code: 58079 /58500
- ^{1} French Land Register data, which excludes lakes, ponds, glaciers > 1 km^{2} (0.386 sq mi or 247 acres) and river estuaries.

Clamecy (French pronunciation: [klamsi]) is a commune and a subprefecture (seat of an arrondissement) of the Nièvre department in central France.

Clamecy is at the confluence of the Yonne and Beuvron and on the Canal du Nivernais, 74 kilometres (46 mi) N.N.E. of Nevers.

Clamecy is locally described as the capital of the valleys of the Yonne and classified under the French tourist criteria "Station Verte de Vacances" (centre for outdoor activity–based vacations) and among the "Plus Beau Détour de France" (most beautiful routes in France).

== History ==
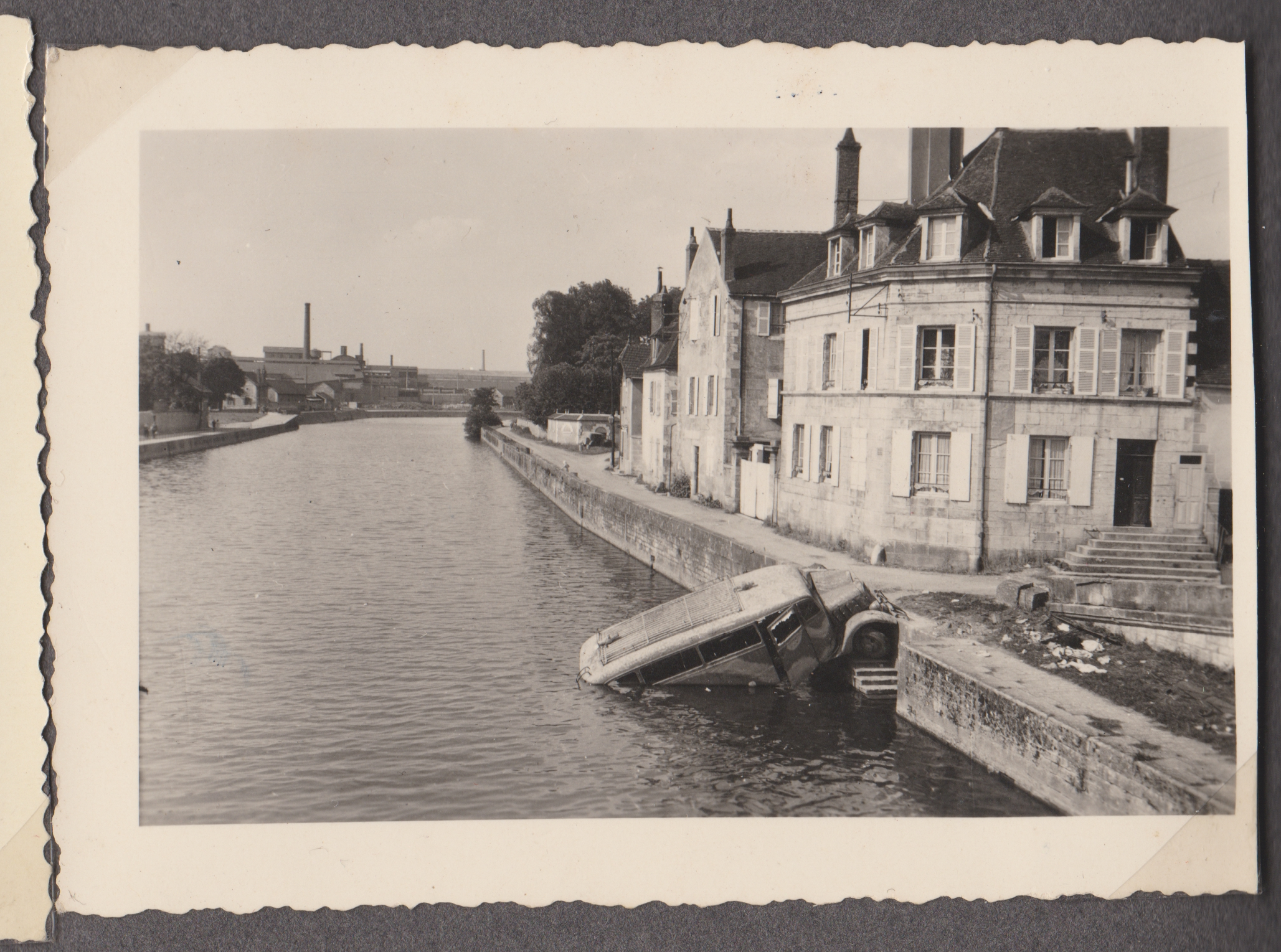
Clamecy in 1940

The earliest literary mention under the name of Clamiciacus, a possession of the bishops of Auxerre, is in the bequest by Pallade, Bishop of Auxerre, in 634, founding an abbey in the suburbs of Auxerre, dedicated to the Virgin, Saint Andrew and Saint Julien, martyr, and supported by lands in Clamiciacus and other places. Clamecy continued to belong to the abbey of St Julian at Auxerre until the eleventh century, when it passed to the counts of Nevers and of Auxerre, one of whom, Hervé, enfranchised the inhabitants in 1213.

The crusading Count William IV of Nevers promised the bishop of Bethlehem that if Bethlehem should ever fall, he would welcome him in Clamecy. After the capture of Jerusalem by Saladin in 1188, the bequest of the now deceased count was honoured and the Bishop of Bethlehem duly took up residence in the hospital of Panthenor, Clamecy, which remained the continuous (if somewhat idiosyncratic) seat of the Bishopric of Bethlehem until the French Revolution.

The town was sacked and substantially rebuilt in the 14th century during the Hundred Years' War.

Clamecy enjoyed great prosperity thanks to the development, by Jean Rouvet, of the 'Flottage du bois', by which timber from the immense forests of the Morvan national park were processed and floated down river to Paris. The 'Flottage' which started in the 16th century continued until the beginning of the 20th century (the last floating 'log train' left Clamecy in 1923).
There is also an interesting hereditary link between Jean de Clamecy (later to become John II, Count of Nevers) and Henry VIII of England, via Jean de Clamecy's daughter, Elizabeth of Nevers, who married John I, Duke of Cleves and was consequently Anne of Cleves great grandmother.

During World War II, on 18 June 1940, the Germans committed a massacre of 40 African prisoners-of-war in Clamecy. Later on, the Germans operated a subcamp of the Frontstalag 150 prisoner-of-war camp in Clamecy.

== Sights ==
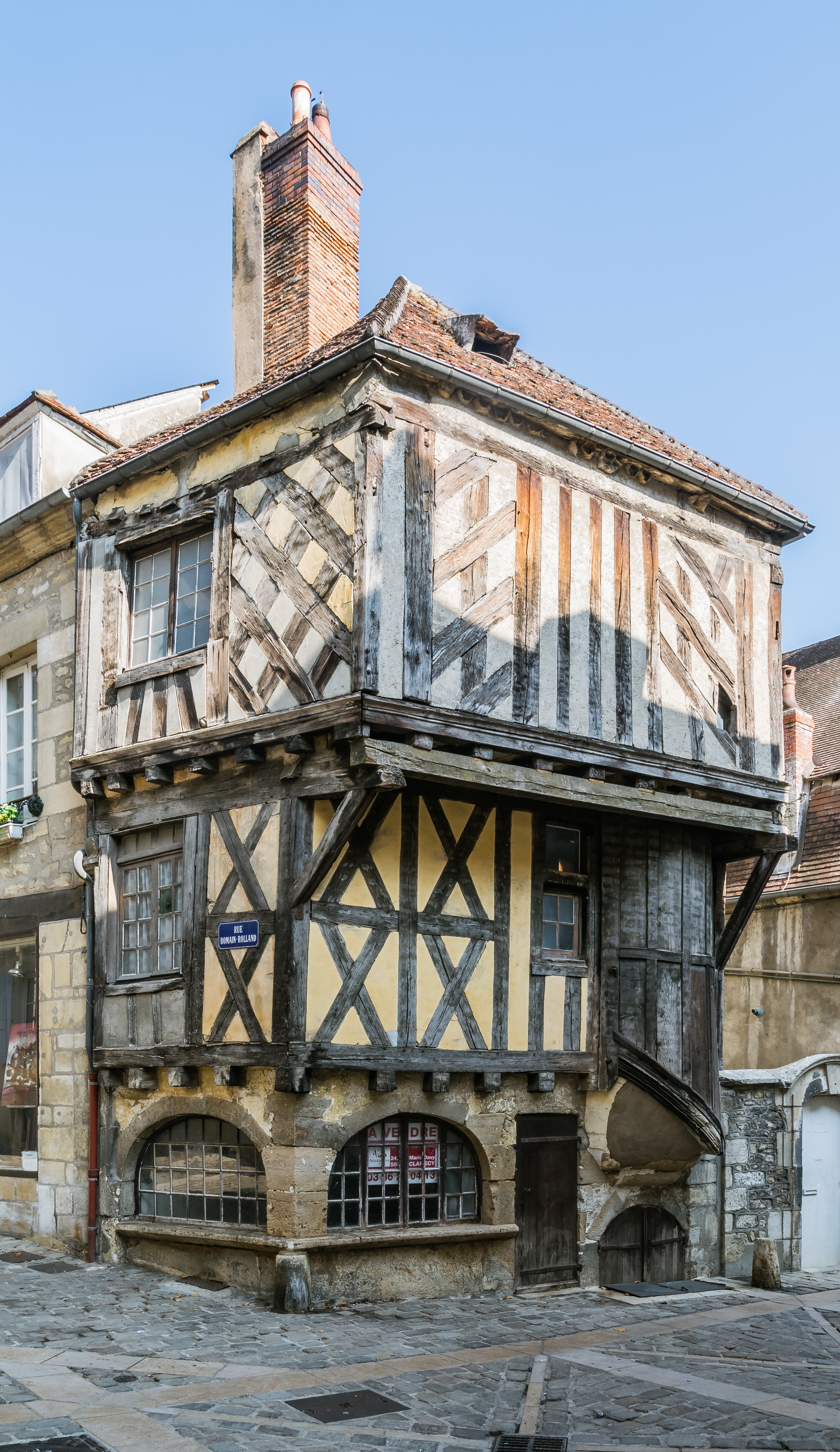
Medieval timber-framed house

The medieval centre of Clamecy has been classed by the French government as a "Secteur Sauvegardé" (protected sector) in entirety; the only such protected area in the whole of the department of the Nievre.

The town has evolved in the typical concentric French manner, with a town centre consisting of 13th- to sixteenth-century houses (still remarkably intact), surrounded by nineteenth-century houses and buildings with 20th-century developments forming an outer ring.

Its principal building is the church of St Martin which dates chiefly from the 13th, 14th and 15th centuries. The tower and façade are of the 16th century. The chevet, which is surrounded by an aisle, is rectangular—a feature found in few French churches. After a period of neglect following the French revolution, the church underwent significant restoration under the auspices of Eugène Viollet-le-Duc and was classified as a historic monument in 1840. Of the old castle of the counts of Nevers (site now occupied by the 19th century Mairie), only the vaulted cellars remain. A church in the suburb of Bethléem (Bethlehem), dating from the 12th and 13th centuries, now serves as part of a hotel.

== Culture ==
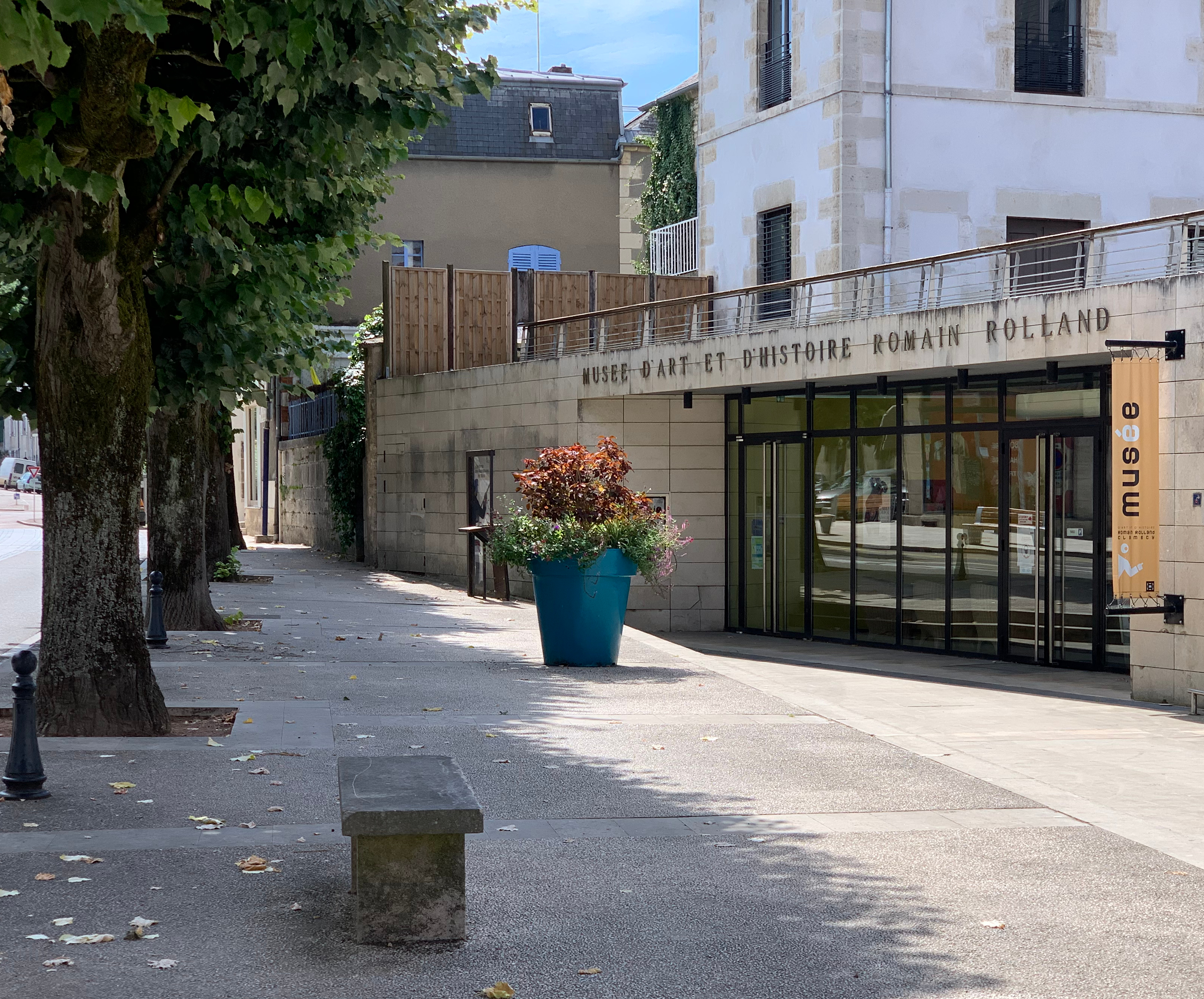
Musée d’Art et d’Histoire Romain Rolland

In recent years, Clamecy has attracted numerous artists from around Europe, who have set up their homes and studios in the historic town centre. In recognition of this, in the summer of 2008, the tourism committee opened a new, contemporary gallery space, in which international and established local artists showcase their work. Resident international Artists include Candl (Czech republic), Horatio Holzbein (UK), Moree (Netherlands), Jane Witheridge (UK) and Lee Woods (UK). Local artists of renown include Remi Cholet, who is best known for his work with the Moulin Rouge in Paris.

Clamecy is also home to a well-respected music college.

In the summer months, Clamecy is home to the Festival des Perthuis - a one-month-long music festival, in which a variety of venues scattered across the town play host to visiting musicians (two or three times a week) catering for all musical tastes.

The afternoon of Bastille Day (July 14) is also the date on which the Tournament du Roi Sec takes place on the Yonne River at Clamecy. The tournament is a light-hearted, waterborne jousting competition, in which the last person left standing on their specially adapted rowing boat at the end of the afternoon is crowned 'the dry King', and carried through the streets by his opponents. This activity is only practiced in two other towns throughout France.

== Economy ==
Clamecy was once the site of saw-mills, fulling-mills and flour-mills, tanneries, and manufactories of boots and shoes and chemicals. It was known for trade in wine and cattle and in wood and charcoal, which was conveyed principally to Paris, by way of the Yonne.

Most of this industry mentioned came to an end in the first two decades of the 20th century. Apart from a few modern industrial units on the edge of town and the remnants of a small acetone production facility, little remains.

Considerable investment by successive local administrations has seen the transformation of the town from a logging centre into a medieval tourist attraction and site for leisure users of the Canal du Nivernais, which runs from Auxerre to Decize.

The modern economy of Clamecy (and the surrounding countryside), is derived from tourism and agriculture, with a high proportion of inhabitants commuting to larger towns such as Auxerre and Paris.

== Institutions ==
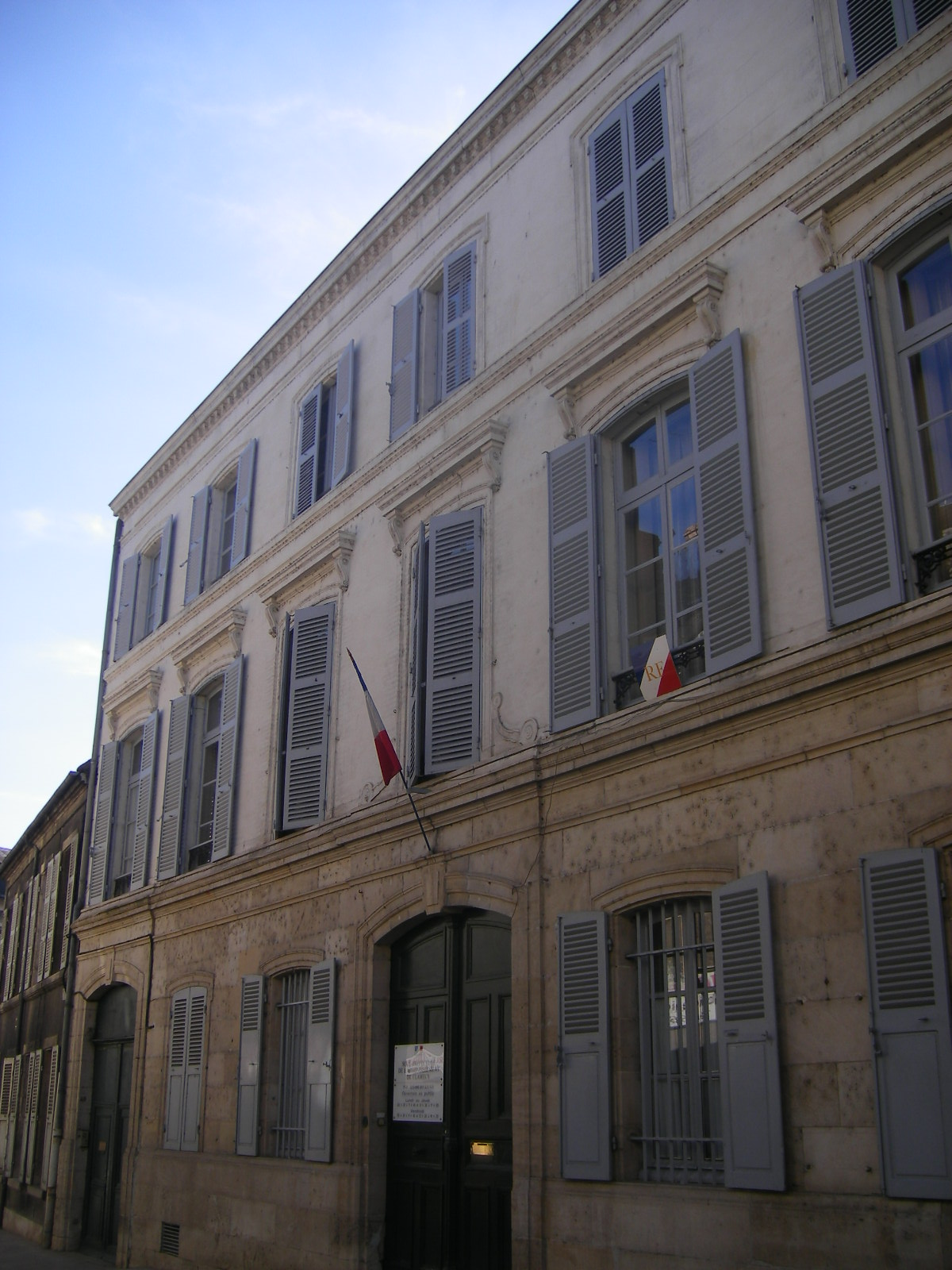
Sub-prefecture

The public institutions include the sub-prefecture, a tribunal de proximité and a communal college.

== Demographics ==
Historical population
Year	Pop.	±% p.a.
1968	5,741	—
1975	5,922	+0.44%
1982	5,590	−0.82%
1990	5,284	−0.70%
1999	4,806	−1.05%
2007	4,424	−1.03%
2012	4,097	−1.52%
2017	3,759	−1.71%
2023	3,544	−0.98%
Source: INSEE

== People ==
- Jean Rouvet (16th century), responsible for dramatic increase in the prosperity of Clamecy when he launched the first 'rafts' of Morvan timber to be floated down the Yonne river to Paris
- Éléonore de Grandmaison (1620–1692), pioneer in Nouvelle France
- Roger de Piles (1635–1709), painter, writer, influential art critic, diplomat, spy (allegedly) and painting buyer to Louis XIV
- Jean Née de la Rochelle (1692–1772), historian
- André Giroud de Villette (1752–1787), One of a duo, who were the first men to 'fly' - in a montgolfier (hot air balloon), paris, 1783.
- Louis Antoine François de Marchangy (1782–1826), writer
- Claude Tillier (1801–1844), political pamphleteer and novelist
- Édouard Séguin (1812–1880), chemist
- Hippolyte Marié-Davy (1820–1893), scientist and inventor
- Théodore Tenaille-Saligny (1830–1889), lawyer, civil servant and politician
- Gabriel Alapetite (1854–1932), prefect, ambassador and minister
- Romain Rolland (1866–1944), writer and winner of the Nobel Prize in Literature in 1915
- Alain Colas (1943–1978), yachtsman
- Arnaud Montebourg (b. 1962), politician

== Twin towns ==
- Gelnhausen, Germany
- Grandes-Piles, Quebec, Canada

== See also ==
- Communes of the Nièvre department
