= List of hotels: Countries F =

This is a list of what are intended to be the notable top hotels by country, five or four star hotels, notable skyscraper landmarks or historic hotels which are covered in multiple reliable publications. It should not be a directory of every hotel in every country:

== Falkland Islands ==
- Malvina House Hotel, Port Stanley

== Faroe Islands ==
- Hotel Føroyar, Tórshavn

== Fiji ==
- Grand Pacific Hotel, Suva
- Shangri-La's Fijian Resort, Yanuca

== Finland ==
- Hotel Ilves, Tampere
- Hotel Kämp, Helsinki
- Hotel Pallas, Muonio
- Hotel Tammer, Tampere
- Hotel Torni, Helsinki
- Omenahotelli, Finland
- Palace Hotel, Helsinki
- Hotel Torni Tampere, Tampere
- Waldorf Astoria Helsinki, Helsinki
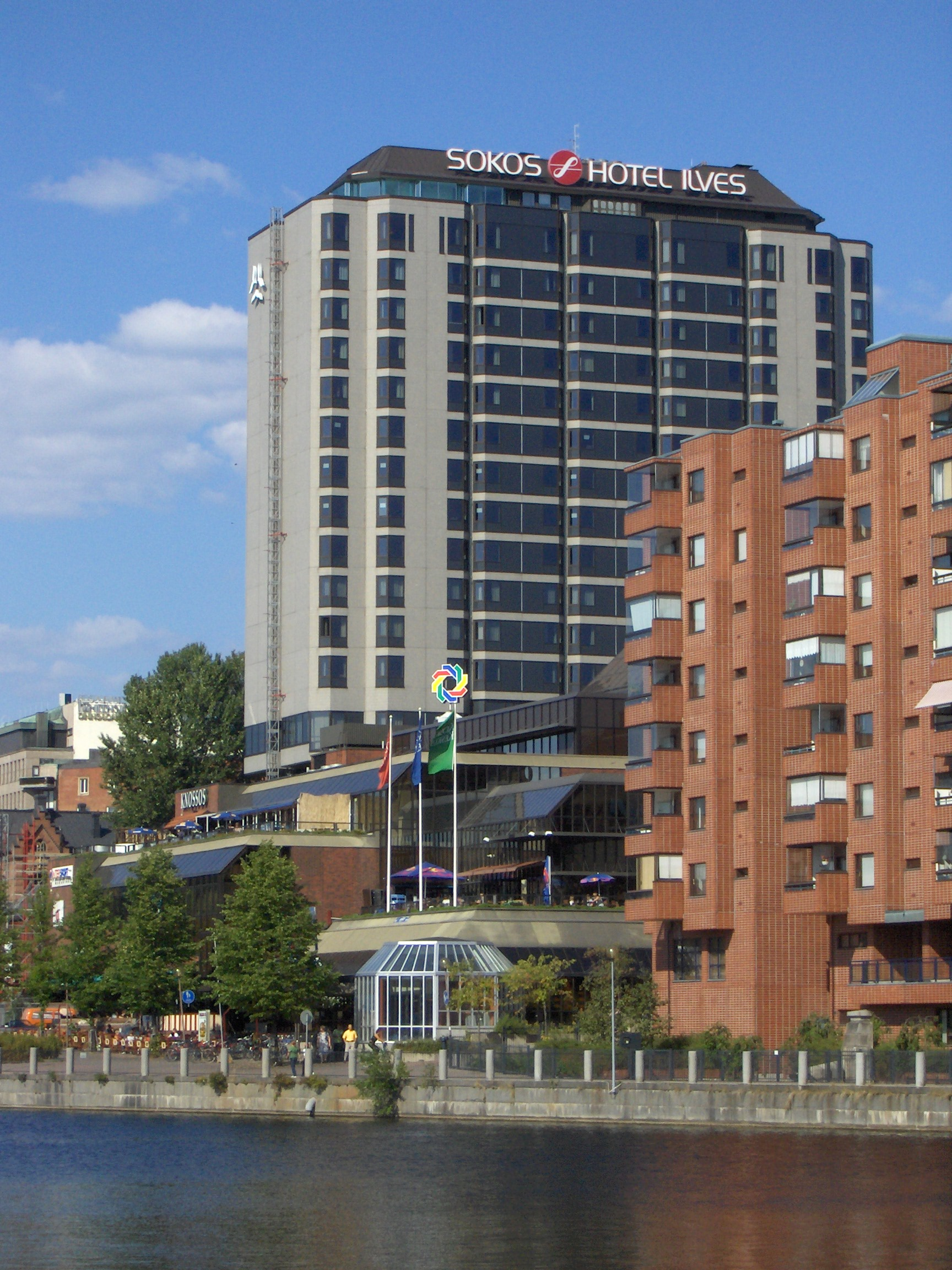
Hotel Ilves

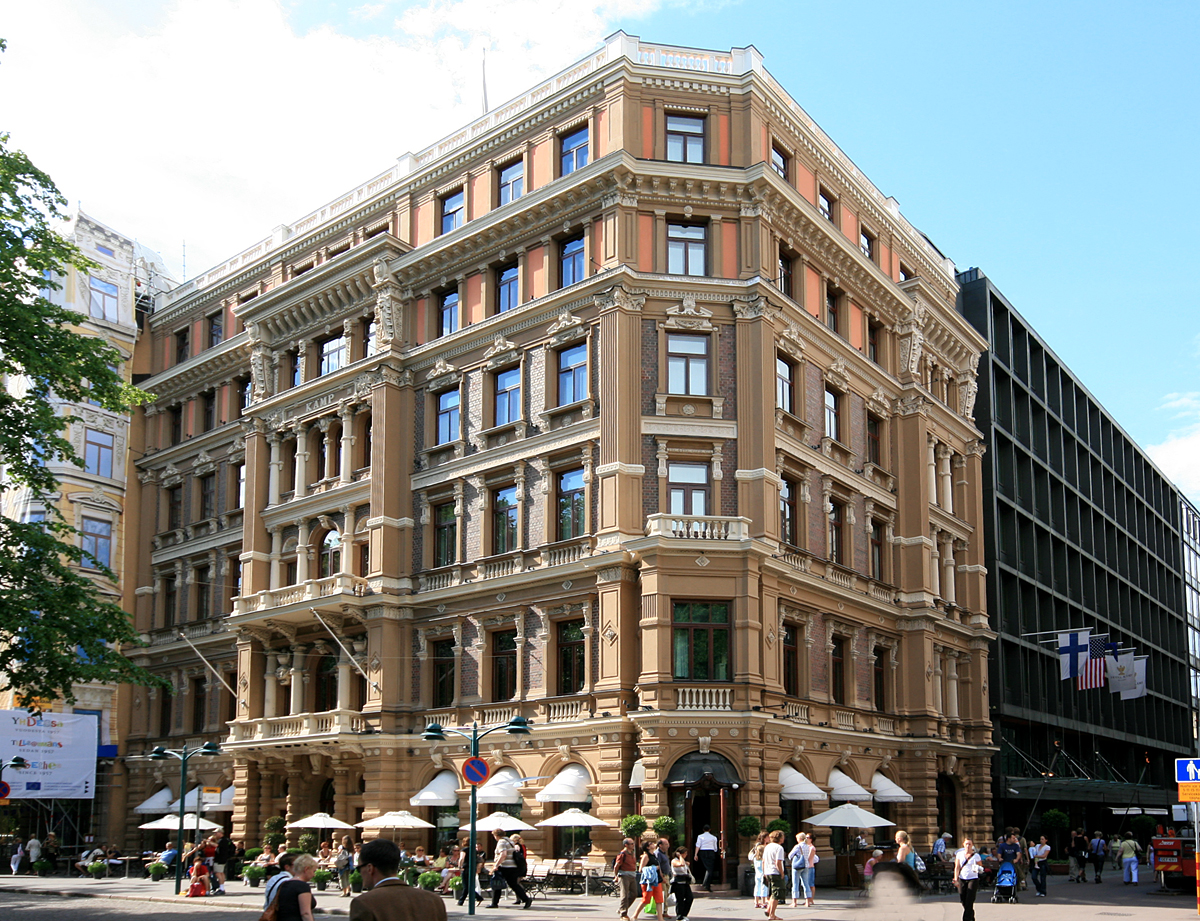
Hotel Kämp

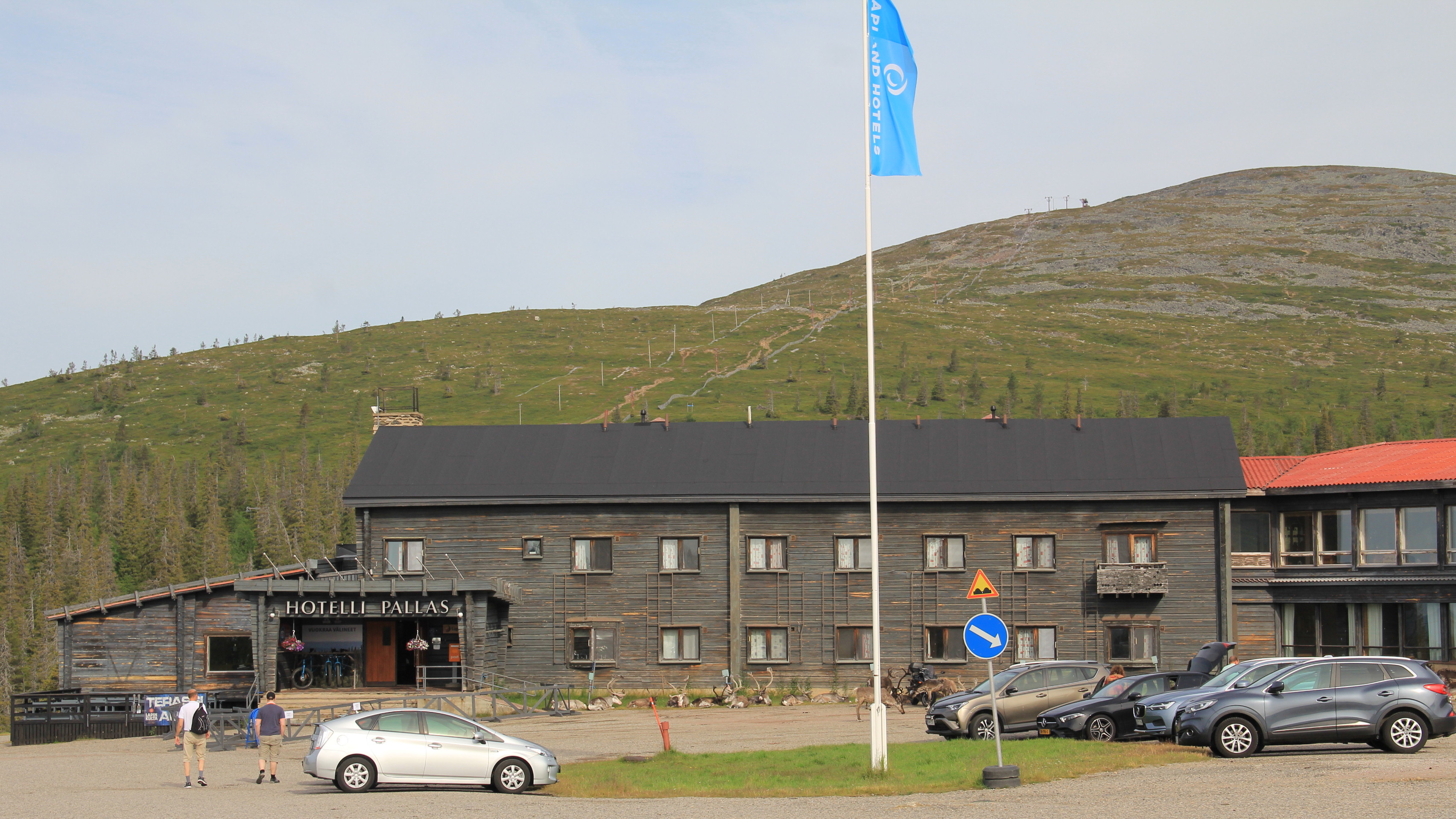
Hotel Pallas

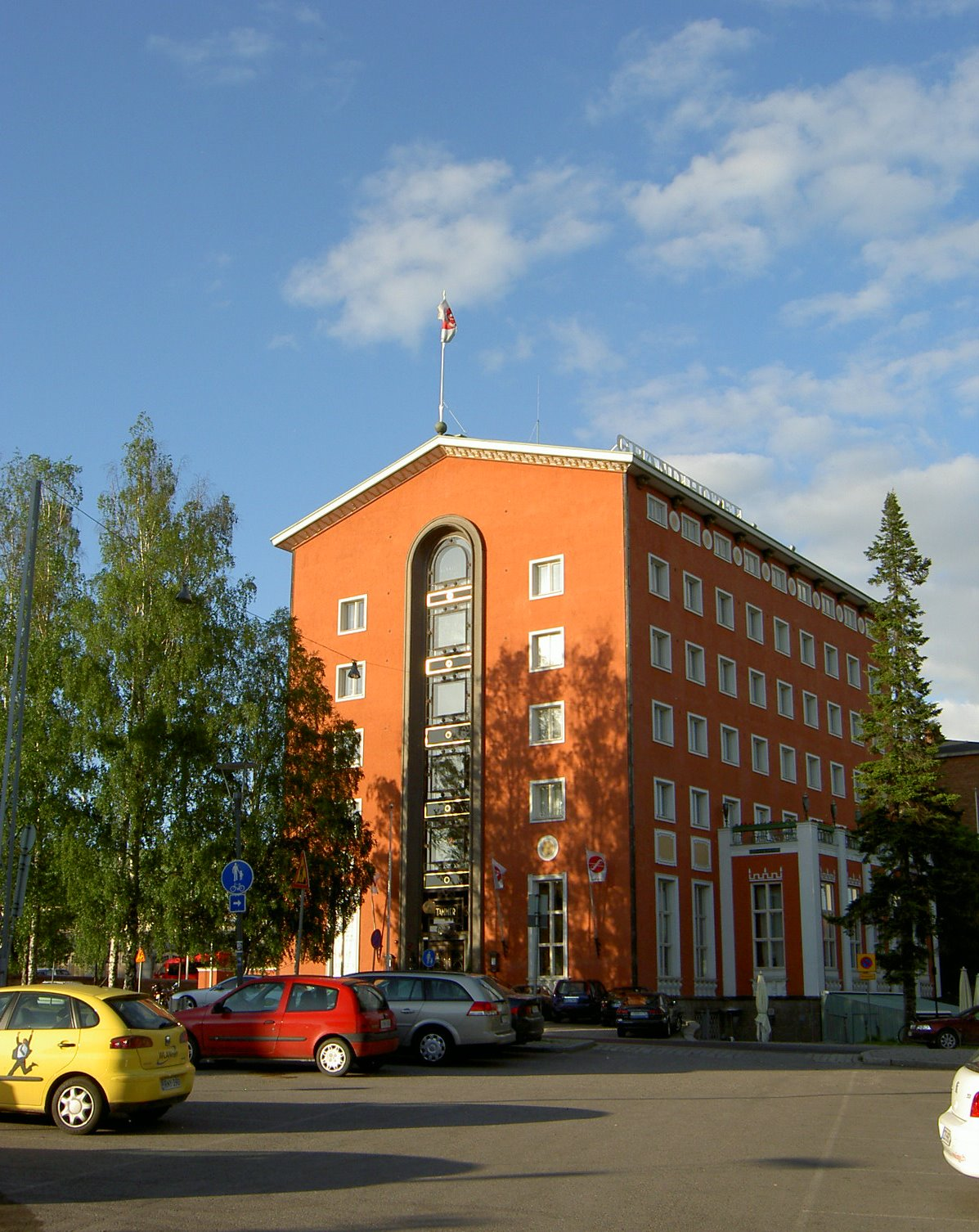
Hotel Tammer

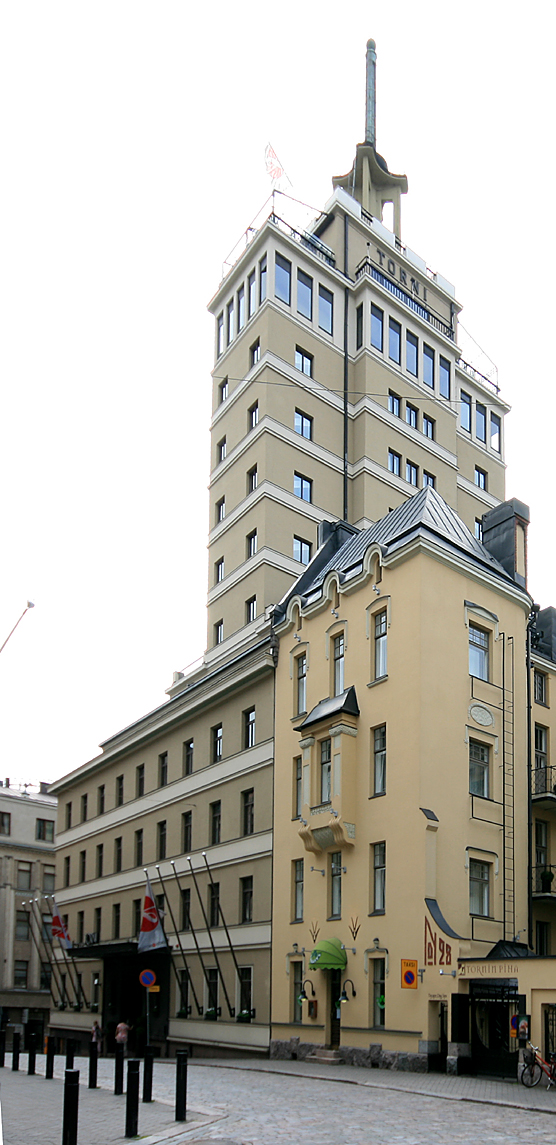
Hotel Torni

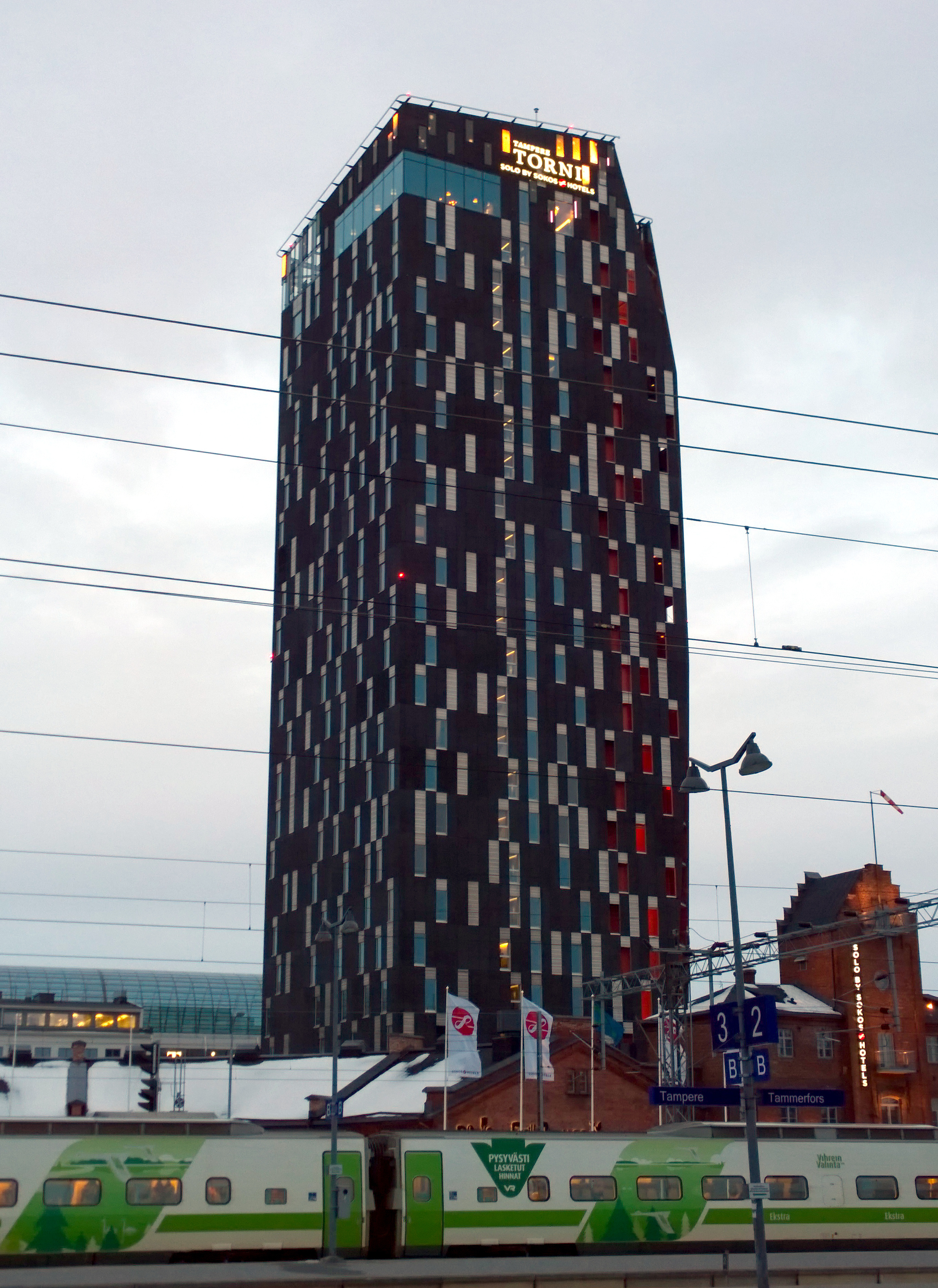
Hotel Torni Tampere

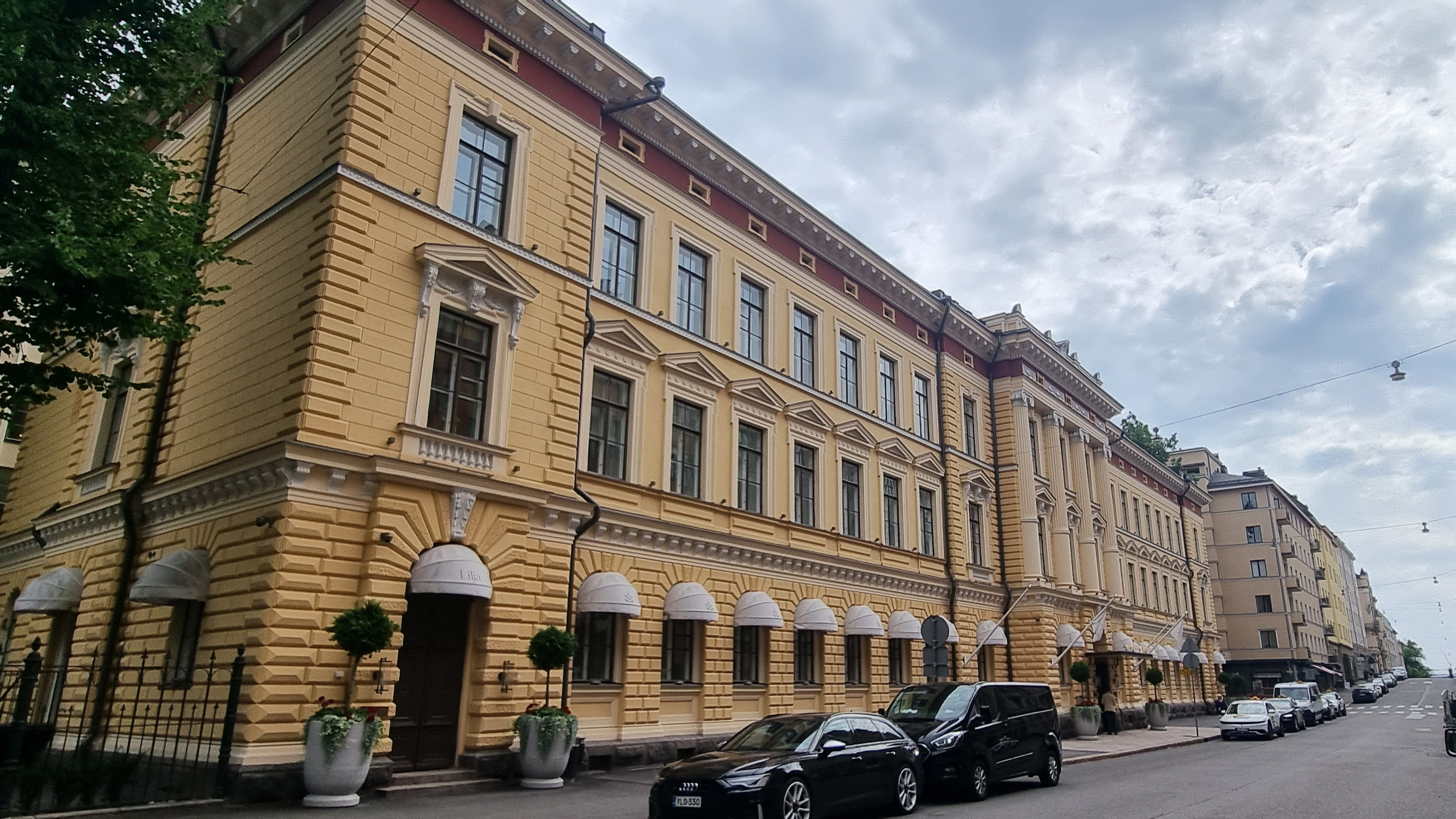
Waldorf Astoria Helsinki

== France ==
- Anjodi (barge)
- Beat Hotel, Paris
- Carlton Cannes, Cannes
- Castille Paris, Paris
- Château de l'Île, Ostwald near Strasbourg
- Enchanté (barge)
- Grand-Hôtel du Cap-Ferrat, Saint-Jean-Cap-Ferrat
- Grand Hotel Moderne, Lourdes
- Hôtel Au Manoir Saint Germain des Prés, Paris
- Hotel Belvédère du Rayon Vert
- Hotel Concorde La Fayette, Paris
- Hôtel Costes, Paris
- Hôtel de Crillon, Paris
- Hotel des Trois Colleges, Paris
- Hôtel du Cap, Antibes
- Hôtel du Palais, Biarritz
- Hôtel Fouquet's Barrière, Paris
- Hotel George V, Paris, Paris
- Hotel La Louisiane, Paris
- Hôtel Le Bristol Paris, Paris
- Hôtel Lutetia, Paris
- Hôtel Martinez, Cannes
- Hôtel Meurice, Paris
- Hôtel Meurice de Calais, Calais
- Hotel Negresco, Nice
- Hôtel Raphael, Paris
- Hôtel Regina, Paris
- Hôtel Ritz Paris, Paris
- Hôtel de Soissons, Paris (historical)
- La Belle Epoque (barge)
- La Clef Champs-Élysées, Paris
- La Renaissance (barge)
- L'Art de Vivre (barge)
- La Voile d'Or, Saint-Jean-Cap-Ferrat
- Le Chabichou, Courchevel, Savoie
- L'Hôtel, Paris
- L'Impressionniste (barge)
- Magna Carta (barge)
- Maison Pic, Valence, Drôme
- Majestic, Cannes
- Majestic Hôtel-Spa, Paris
- Noga Hilton, Cannes
- Normandy Barrière, Deauville
- Nymphea (barge)
- Palais de la Méditerranée, Nice
- Pershing Hall, Paris
- Plaza Athénée, Paris
- Rosa (barge)
- Royal Picardy (barge)
- Saint Louis (barge)
- Savoir Faire (barge)
- The Westin Paris - Vendôme, Paris

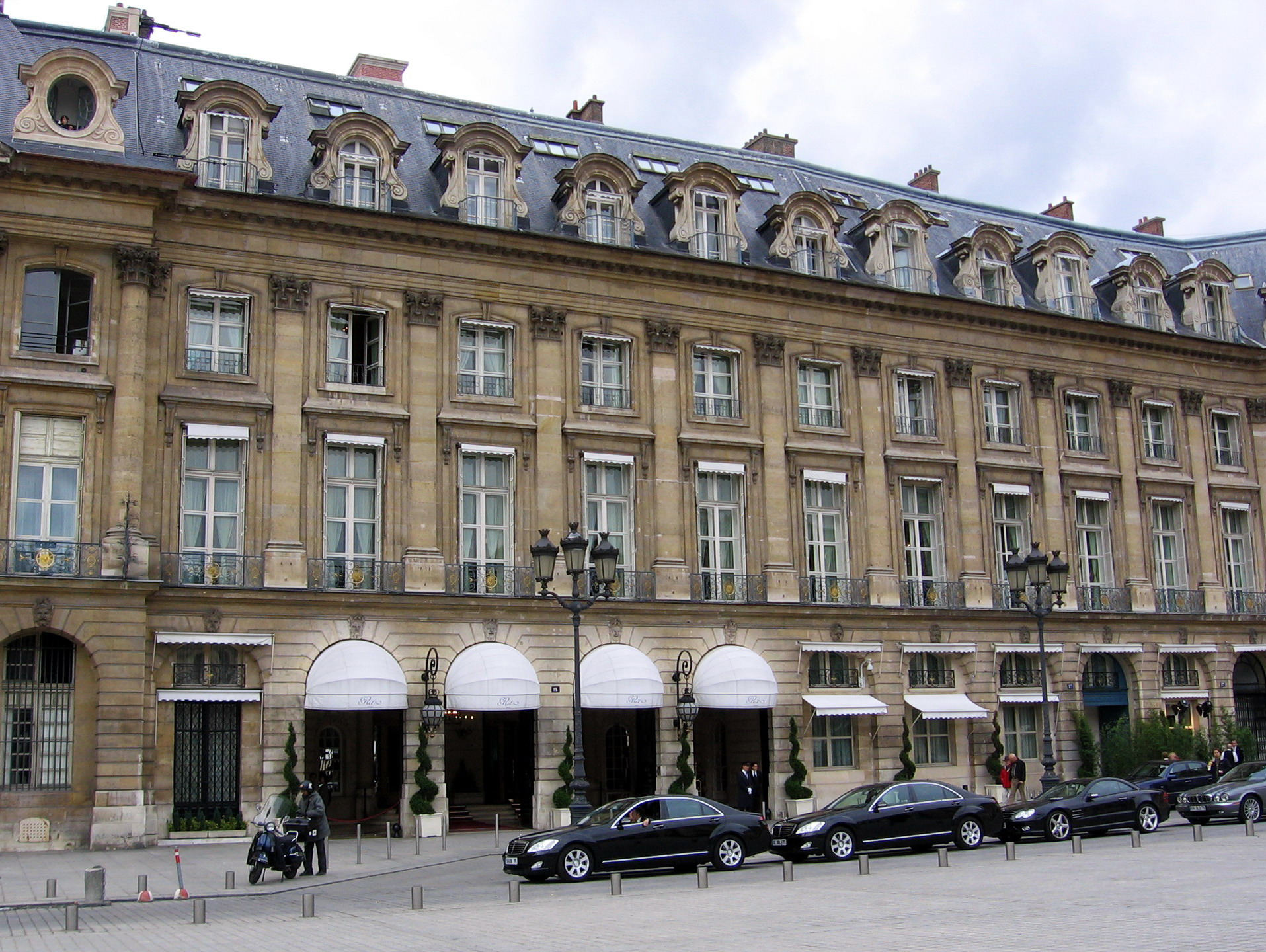
Hôtel Ritz Paris

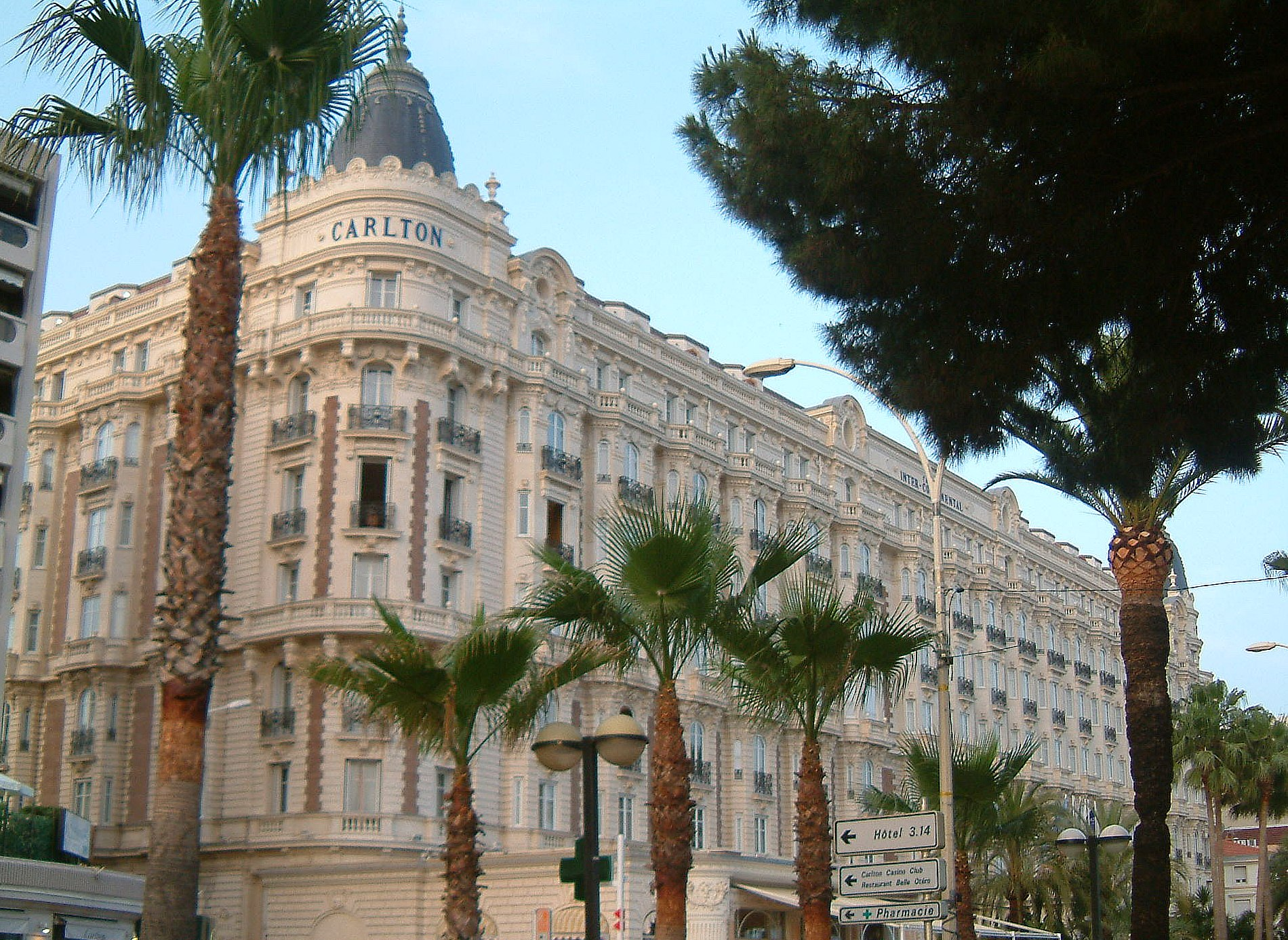
Carlton Cannes

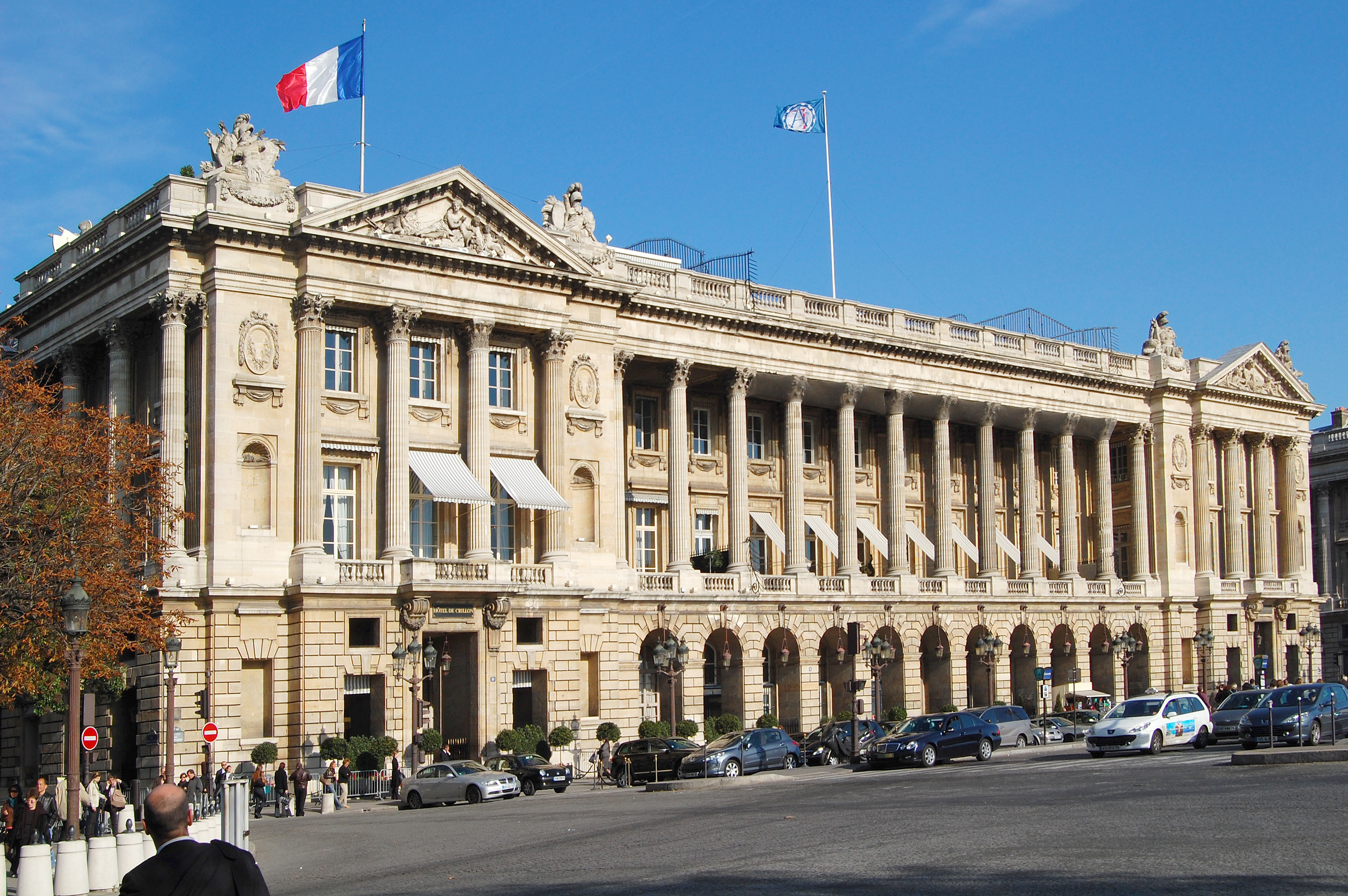
Hôtel de Crillon

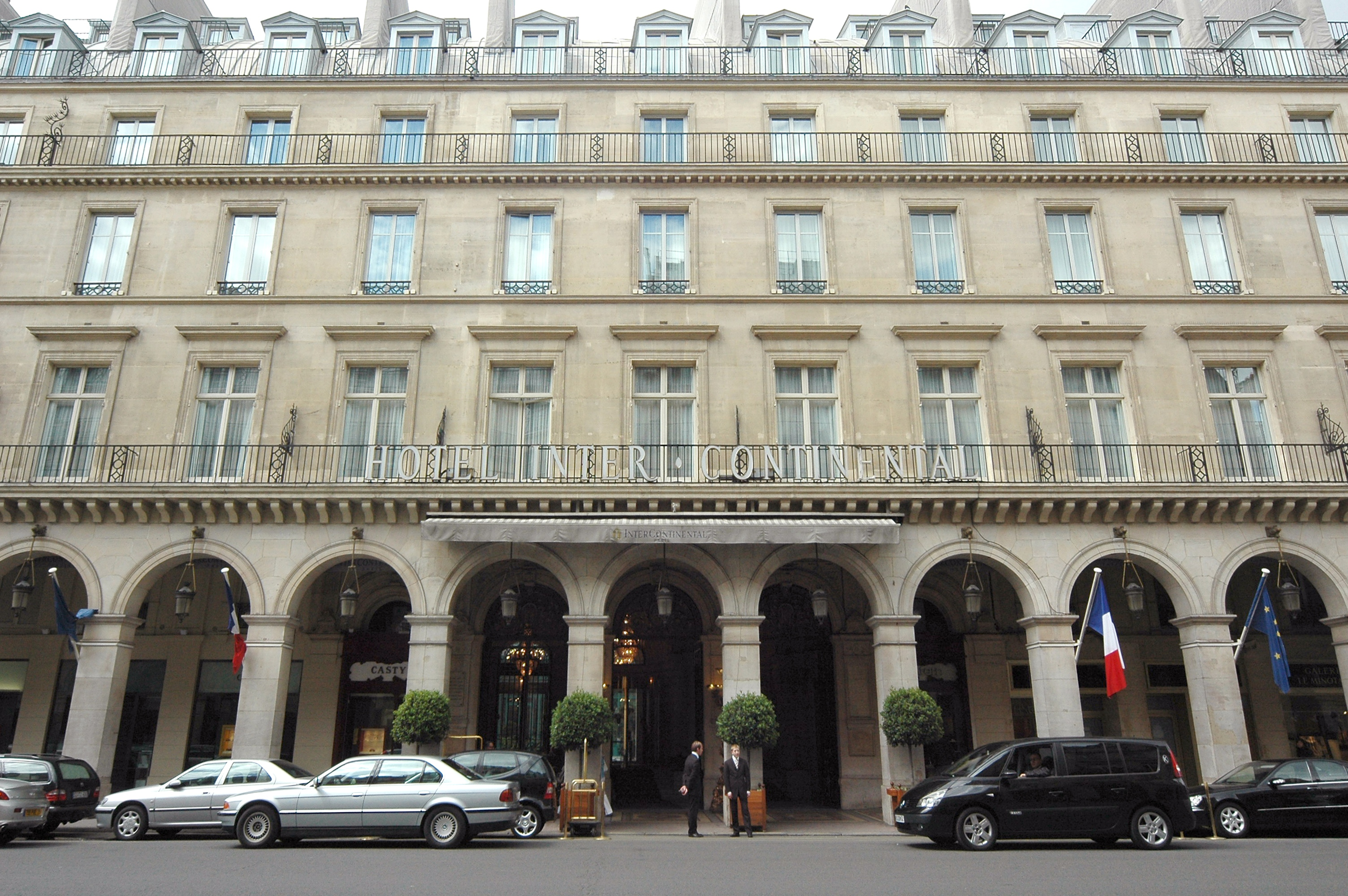
The Westin Paris - Vendôme
