= European Waterways =

European Waterways Limited
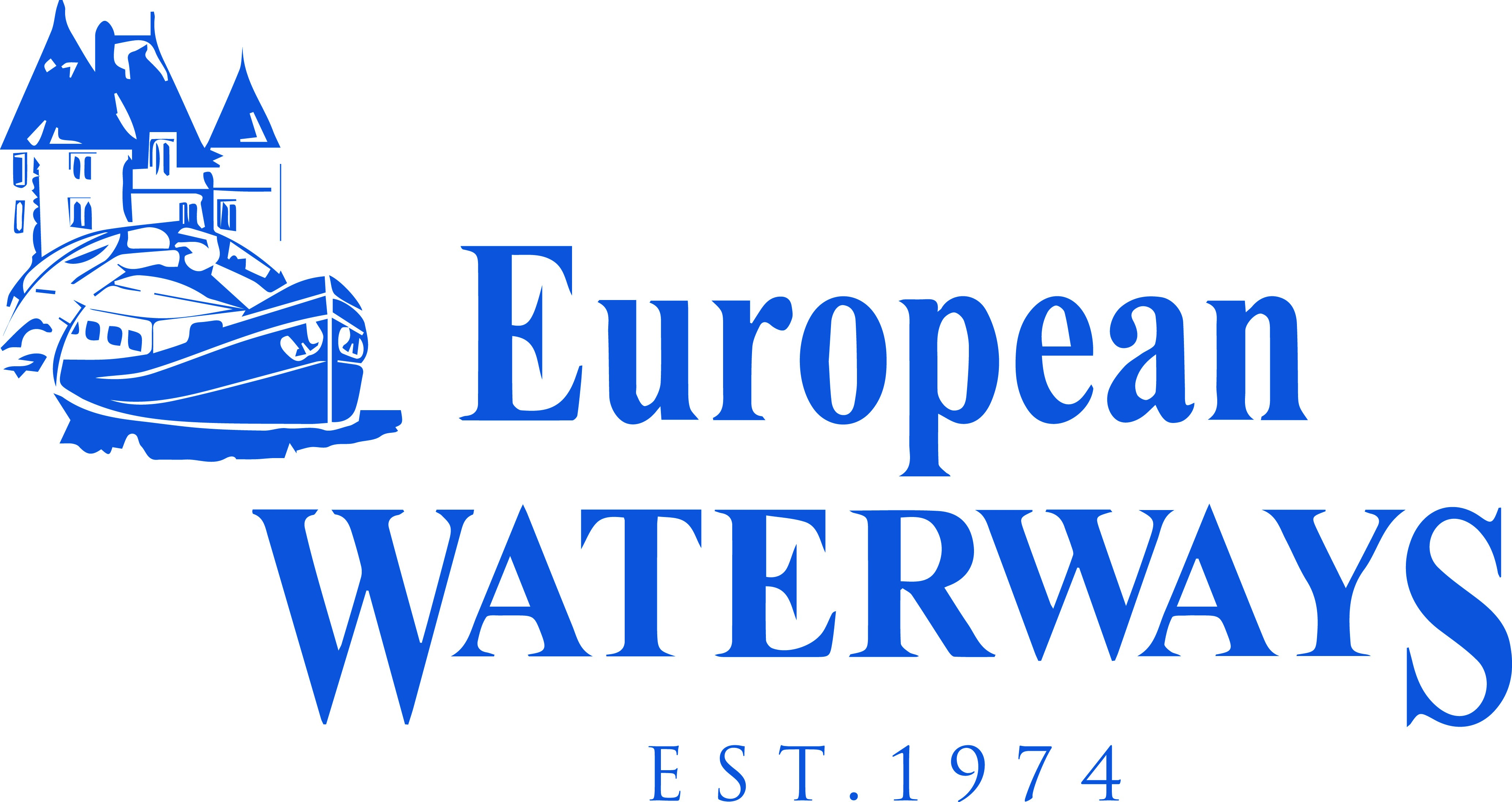
- Company type: Private limited company
- Industry: Travel
- Founded: 1974
- Headquarters: Datchet, Berkshire, United Kingdom
- Key people: Derek Banks, John Wood-Dow
- Products: Hotel Barging
- Number of employees: 50 - 75
- Website: europeanwaterways.com

European Waterways is an international company based in Berkshire, England that operates a fleet of 17 river cruising vessels along the rivers and canals of Europe. The company takes old trading barges and converts them into hotel barges.

== Company history ==
European Waterways, a UK company based in England, was established in 1977 by owner Derek Banks with the purchase of an existing French inland waterways cruising company which had been created 3 years earlier in 1974. The first hotel barge was Anjodi, which was originally purchased in 1982. In 1994 the company built the 12 passenger La Belle Epoque followed by its sister ship, 12 passenger L'Impressionniste, in 1995. After these acquisitions European Waterways expanded steadily and, as a result of cooperation with several companies in the travel industry and additional acquisitions, now operates a fleet of 17 hotel barges along the inland waterways of 9 countries in Europe.

Banks, the company founder, was brought up on the River Thames and has enjoyed all aspects of life afloat. It was as a result of this early exposure to the inland waterways that he was inspired to move to a lock house in the middle of France in the mid 1970s and start a barge cruising company.

The company originally focused on the Canal du Nivernais in central Burgundy, France, but as of 2018 operates throughout Europe.

=== Current fleet ===
Ship name	Year built	Length	Crew	Guests
La Belle Epoque	1930	128 feet	5	12
L'Art de Vivre	1917	100 feet	4	8
L'Impressionniste	1960	128 feet	5	12
Rosa	1907	98 feet	4	8
Enchanté	1958	100 feet	4	8
Spirit of Scotland	2003	126 feet	6	12
Anjodi	1930	100 feet	4	8
Athos	1964	103 feet	4	10
Nymphea	1921	80 feet	3	6
La Renaissance	1960	128 feet	5	8
La Nouvelle Etoile	1964	129 feet	5	8
Scottish Highlander	1931	117 feet	4	8
Magna Carta	1931	117 feet	8	4
Shannon Princess II	2003	107 feet	5	10
La Bella Vita	1960	140 feet	5-8	20
Panache	1959	128 feet	6	12
