= L'Impressionniste =

Hotel barge on Canal de Bourgogne, France

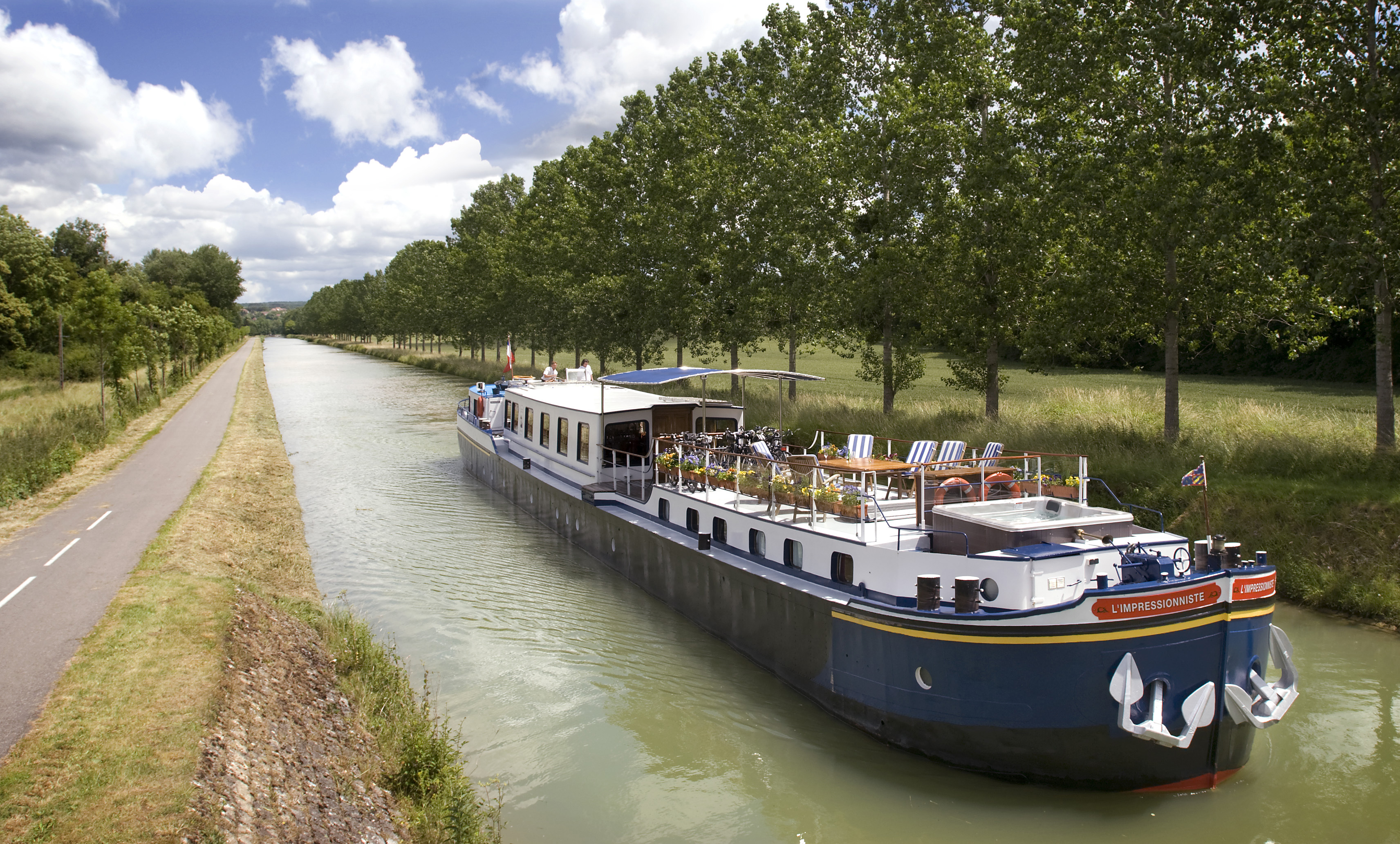
- L'Impressioniste on the Canal de Bourgogne

History

France
- Name: L'Impressionniste
- Owner: European Waterways, LTD
- Operator: European Waterways, LTD
- Port of registry: Bourdoux
- Route: Burgundy Canal: Escommes to Fleurey-sur-Ouche
- Launched: 1960
- Status: In service

General characteristics
- Class & type: Commercial passenger vessel
- Tonnage: 180 tonnes
- Length: 126 ft (38 m)
- Beam: 16.5 ft (5.0 m)
- Height: 10.5 ft (3.2 m)
- Draught: 4.6 ft (1.4 m)
- Decks: 2
- Installed power: 2 x 220-volt generators (silent night running)
- Propulsion: Main engine Z15 Scania 250 hp
- Speed: Maximum 12 knots
- Capacity: 13 passengers
- Crew: 5 crew
- Notes: Holds 12 tons of water, 3.5 tons of fuel

The L'Impressionniste (English: The Impressionist) was built in 1960 in Belgium and is a spits barge with a Dutch luxe motor-style bow. The overall hull shape of the barge is a marriage of the French and Dutch barge building influences. She was converted to a hotel barge in 1996. L'Impressionniste is owned and operated by European Waterways and sails on the Canal de Bourgogne in France.

== History ==
The vessel is slab-sided and has a flat lower part of the hull which means she was fairly cheap to build originally and space was maximized as the hull is effectively a box section. During the 1960s she carried grain and timber, making regular trips between Paris and Brussels. She had a particularly long commercial hold for a vessel of 38.50m overall length, and this eventually was one of the reasons her hull was well suited to be converted into a hotel barge.

Her conversion took place in 1996 and was mainly done by Verrian Gray and Geoffrey Foot, two English engineers. Her design and layout were based on La Belle Epoque, which was built the year before, and the original owners purchased the plans from Leigh Wootton. She was originally powered by an 8-cylinder Deutz diesel engine which produced 200 horsepower (150 kW). This gave the barge a top speed of 16 km/h. She has a single rudder and chain-link steering which, coupled with her relatively fine bow, ensure practical maneuverability. She was re-engined in 2000 with a Scania 250 hp (190 kW) and spent several of the following years on the river Rhône, which has a strong current and needs plenty of horsepower.

L'Impressionniste currently has 6 double cabins, allowing her to carry up to 12 passengers. She also has separate crew quarters which house the 5 crew. Deck Plan The crew consists of a captain and pilot, deck hand and tour guide, master chef and two housekeepers and waiters. She regularly cruises on the Burgundy Canal.
