= Savoir faire =

Savoir faire may refer to:

- Savoir-faire, a French phrase used by English speakers
- Savoir-Faire, interactive fiction by Emily Short
- Savoir Faire (barge), a European cargo vessel built in 1924 and converted into a hotel barge in 1976
- Savoir-Faire, a character from Klondike Kat
- "Savoir Faire", a song by Chic from the 1978 album C'est Chic
- "Savoir Faire", a song by Suede from the 1999 album Head Music
- "Savoir Faire", a song by Beth Ditto from the 2017 album Fake Sugar

== See also ==
- Heloise and the Savoir Faire, an American band
