= Scottish Highlander =

Scottish Highlander may refer to:

- The people and culture of the Scottish Highlands
- Scottish Highlander (barge) a boutique hotel barge cruising the Caledonian Canal in Scotland
