= Scottish Highlander (barge) =

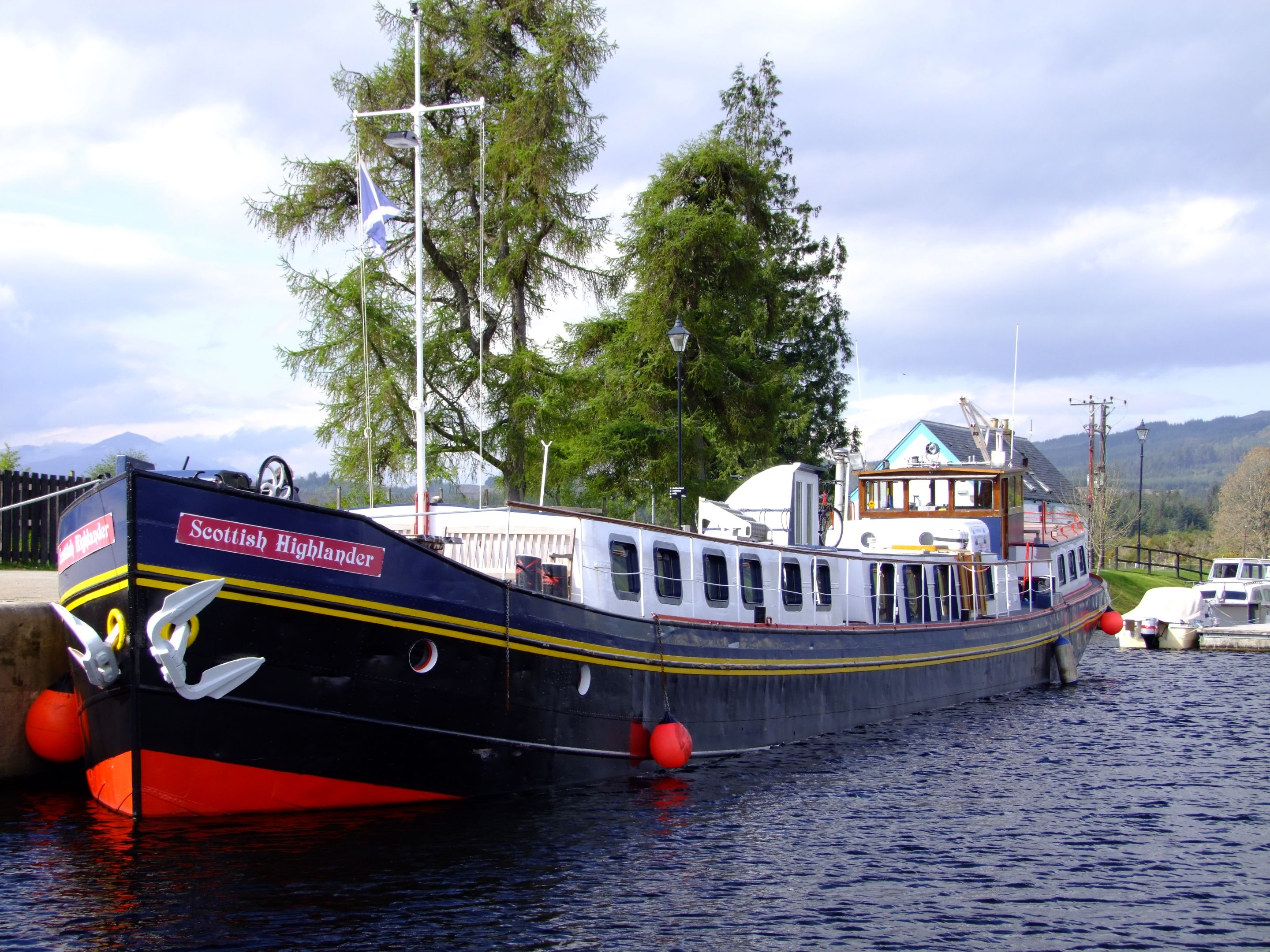
- The Scottish Highlander hotel barge moored on the Caledonian Canal.

History

United Kingdom
- Name: Scottish Highlander
- Owner: European Waterways
- Operator: European Waterways
- Port of registry: London
- Route: Caledonian Canal- Dochgarroch to Banavie
- Launched: 1931
- Christened: Vertrouwen
- Status: In service

General characteristics
- Class & type: Commercial passenger vessel
- Tonnage: 200
- Length: 117 ft (36 m)
- Beam: 16.5 ft (5.0 m)
- Height: 11.5 ft (3.5 m)
- Draught: 4.6 ft (1.4 m)
- Decks: 2
- Installed power: 2x Beta Marine, 23kVA 230/1/50 BV3300, generator
- Propulsion: Gardner 6LX 120HP
- Speed: 4 knots, 10 knots max
- Capacity: 8 passengers
- Crew: 4 crew
- Notes: Holds 8 tons of water and 3 tons of fuel

The Scottish Highlander is a boutique hotel barge cruising the Caledonian Canal in Scotland, from Inverness to Fort William. She is a Luxe motor Dutch steel barge. She is a member of the fleet of hotel barges owned by European Waterways.

== History ==
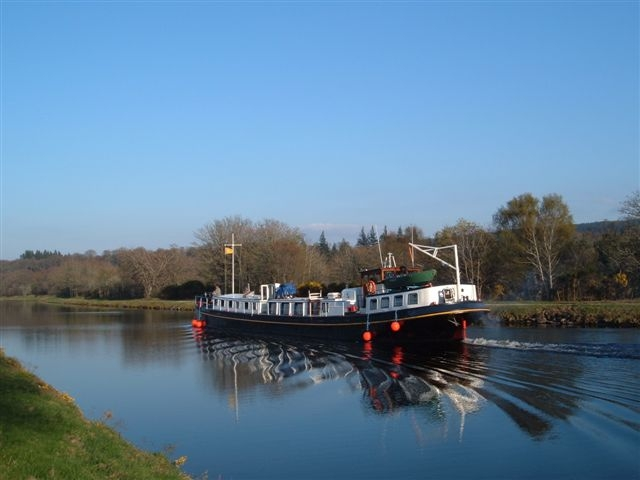
Scottish Highlander on the Caledonian Canal

She was built in 1931, by Gebroeders Van Zutphen, in Vreeswijk, the Netherlands as a trading barge. She was christened the Vertrouwen, meaning "trust" in Dutch. She served as a trading barge for her first 60 years, transporting grain and various commodities throughout the Netherlands.

J.P. Leisure Limited purchased the vessel in 1991. Following a renovation in the Netherlands, it sailed to Inverness in April 1993 to commence operations as a passenger ship.

In 1999 she was purchased by Derek Banks to become part of the European Waterways fleet of hotel barges. From 1999 to 2000 she was completely renovated, renamed Scottish Highlander and was refurbished again in 2006.

As a working hotel barge, she cruises in Scotland on the Caledonian Canal with up to 8 passengers having four passenger cabins, three crew cabins, and a saloon.

She is crewed by a captain, tour guide, chef and housekeeper.
