= Aslaug (barge) =

Hotel barge

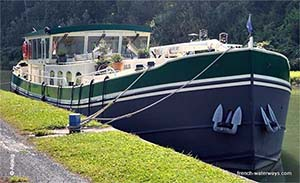
- Aslaug moored at Cappy on a canal section of the river Somme

History

France
- Name: Aslaug
- Owner: Arnild Barging
- Route: Canal de la Somme
- Builder: Ament Metaalbewerking, Kinrooi, Belgium
- Launched: 2006
- Status: In service

General characteristics
- Class & type: Commercial passenger vessel
- Tonnage: 90 tonnes
- Length: 24 m (79 ft)
- Beam: 4.85 m (15.9 ft)
- Height: 3.30 m (10.8 ft)
- Draught: 1.20 m (3.9 ft)
- Propulsion: single 225 hp John Deere diesel engine
- Capacity: 6 passengers
- Crew: 2 crew
- Notes: Fuel capacity 10,500 litres, Water capacity 6500 litres, Grey/black water capacity 3500 litres

Aslaug is a replica Luxemotor Dutch barge built in 2005/2006 to operate as a hotel barge on the French waterways. She is one of around 50 hotel barges operating in France, and currently offers holiday cruises on the river Somme (Canal de la Somme), between Saint-Valéry-sur-Somme and Péronnes. She is the only hotel barge operating on this waterway. Aslaug was named after a queen of Norse mythology.

== History ==
Traditional-style craft on the French waterways are renewed thanks to new builds like the Aslaug, which the Danish owners ordered after several years of cruising the waterways in their motor yacht. This style is a smaller barge than those for which the French canals were built, and is effectively an import from the Netherlands, where, as recently as the 1970s, many much smaller canals were navigated by craft of this type, carrying 70-90 tonnes. The barge was designed by Euroship Services, Heerewaarden, Netherlands, and built by Ament Metaalbewerking in Kinrooi, Belgium, which regularly builds recreational 'barge-type' craft up to 25m in length.

== Hotel barge ==
The barge was purpose-built to accommodate up to four passengers in two large cabins with en-suite bathrooms, while the owners occupy a third cabin. She was fitted out with natural materials: solid wood, pierre bleue, steel and rockwool, with no synthetic fabrics or insulation materials emitting gases. She combines a nautical style with Danish design and is fitted out to high standards.

The centenary of the start of World War I inspired the owners to spend the summers of 2014-2018 along the Canal de la Somme in the Picardy region, initial interest being due to the fact that the owner's grandfather participated in World War I as a volunteer in the Australian army and was twice wounded in battle.
