= La Renaissance (barge) =

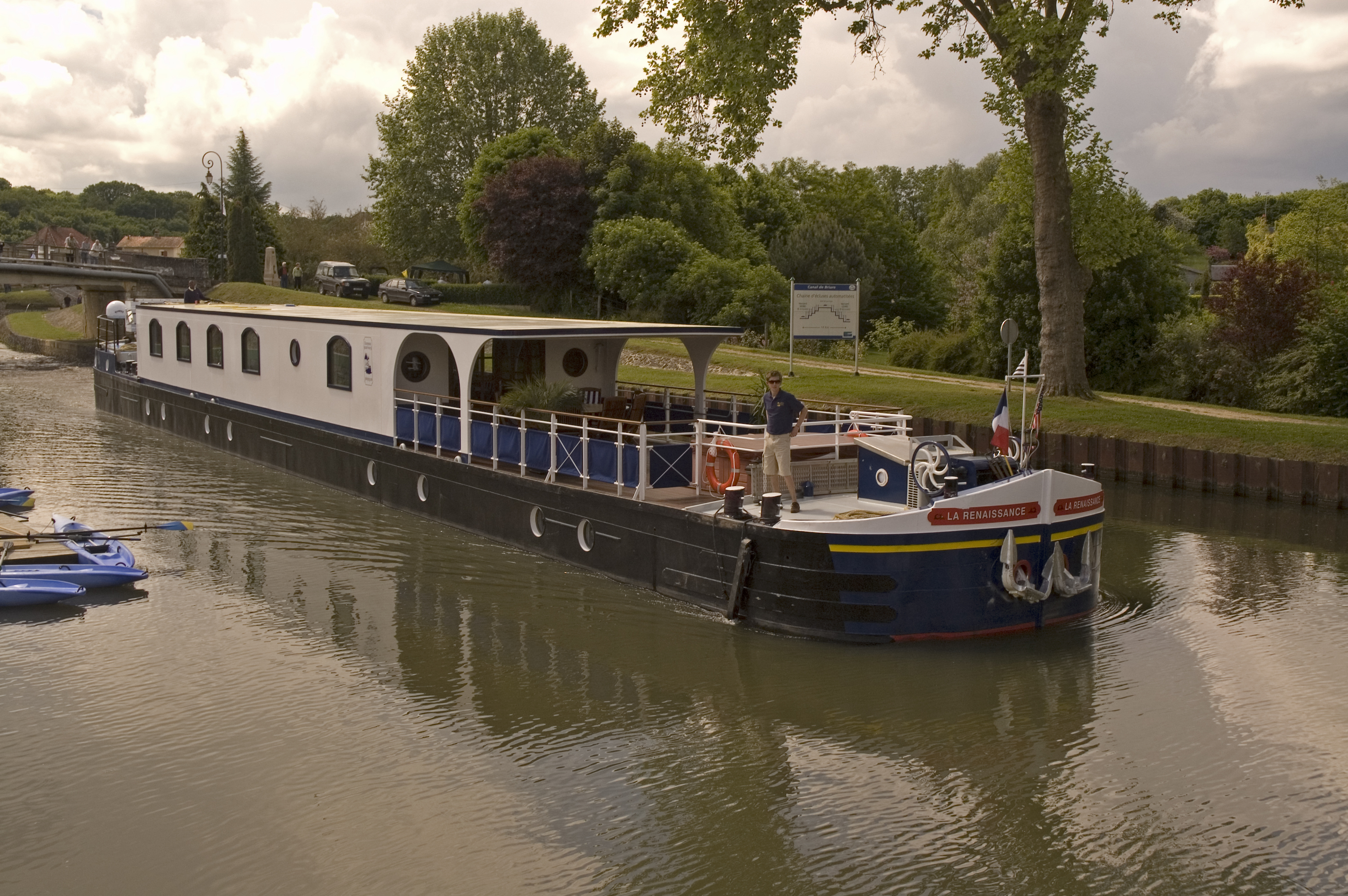
- Renaissance cruising on the Canal de Briare

History

France
- Name: Renaissance
- Owner: European Waterways, LTD
- Operator: European Waterways, LTD
- Port of registry: Paris
- Route: River Seine/Canal de Briare: Montargis to Châtillon-sur-Loire
- Launched: 1960
- Christened: Bonne Humeur
- Status: In service

General characteristics
- Class & type: Commercial passenger vessel
- Tonnage: 275 tons
- Length: 128 ft (39 m)
- Beam: 17.5 ft (5.3 m)
- Height: 12.5 ft (3.8 m)
- Draught: 5.25 ft (1.60 m)
- Decks: 2
- Installed power: 2 × 220 volt generators
- Propulsion: 250 hp (190 kW) Baudoin
- Speed: Maximum speed 10 knots (19 km/h; 12 mph)
- Capacity: 8 passengers
- Crew: 5 crew
- Notes: Fuel capacity 3 tons, Water capacity 12 tons

Renaissance was built in Belgium in 1960 as a standard péniche barge to carry cargo along the canals of Europe. Her original cargo was grain and iron ore. She presently serves as a hotel barge, owned and operated by European Waterways. She is one of around 60 barges offering luxury cruises on French waterways.

== History ==
The barge was built as La Bonne Humeur in 1960, and measures 39 metres (127 ft 11 in) long by 5.20 metres (17 ft 1 in) wide. She has a rectangular hull section, bluff bow and a counter-hung rudder, and is effectively the largest-size vessel which can pass through the Freycinet locks in France and Belgium. This corresponds to a potential loading capacity of 350 tons if loading to the maximum draught of 2.20 m (7 ft 3 in).

In 1997, she was converted to a hotel barge and underwent another refit in 2006. She was purchased by European Waterways in 2007. She was then taken to a boatyard in Belgium for inspection, maintenance and modifications. The hull has two wear strips welded outside the chine which mean the hard wear of rubbing against lock walls will be absorbed by this sacrificial steel strip.

== Hotel barge ==
The barge was renamed Renaissance and began operations on the canals of western Burgundy and the upper Loire in May, 2008. She currently has four double cabins allowing her to carry up to eight passengers. She also has separate crew quarters. The crew of five consists of captain and pilot, deck hand and tour guide, master chef, housekeeper, and waiter.

She has a top speed of 10 knots (19 km/h; 12 mph), but usually cruises at the canal speed limit of 6 kilometres per hour (3.2 kn; 3.7 mph).
