= L'Art de Vivre =

French commercial passenger vessel

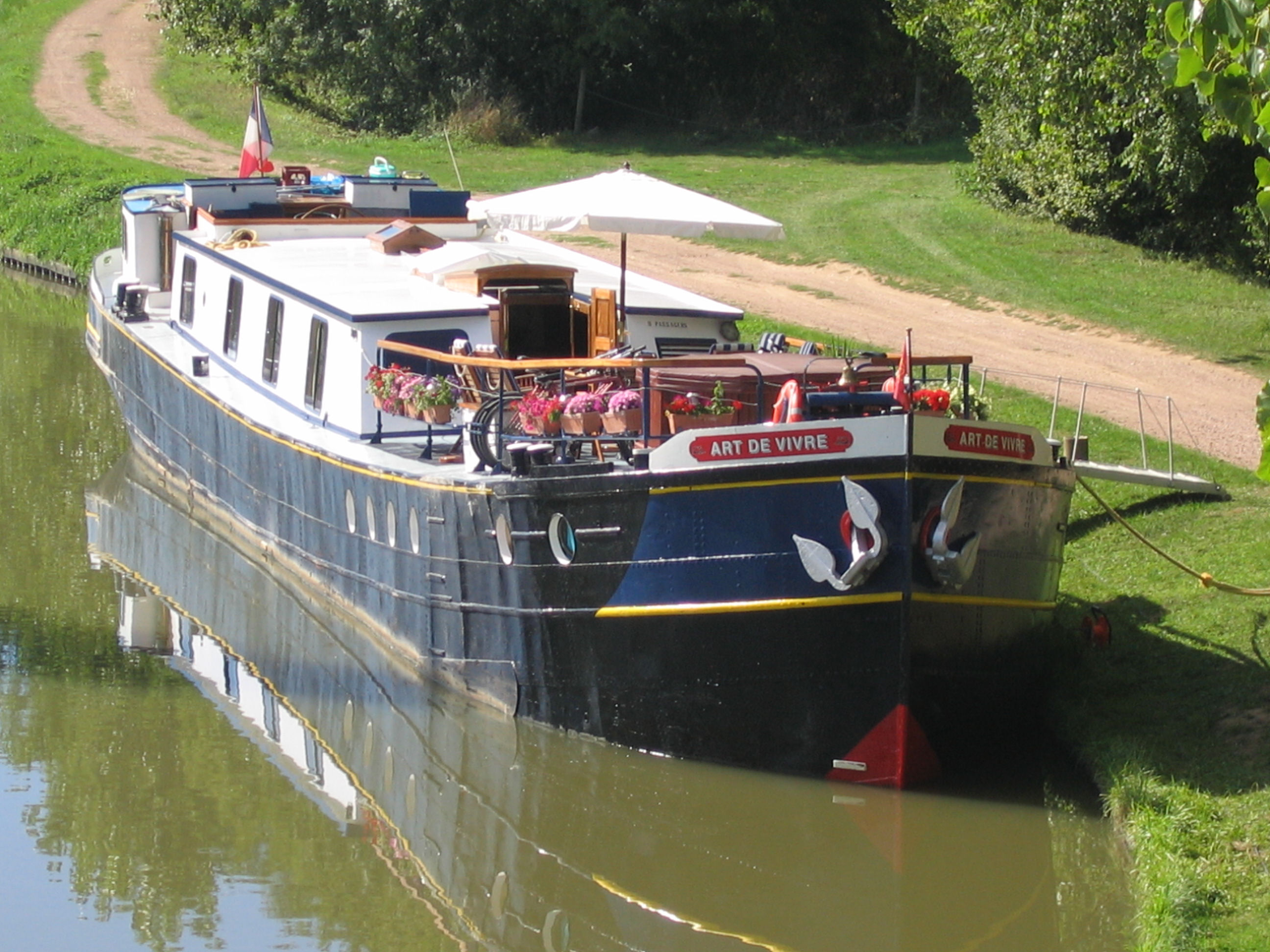
- The hotel barge L'Art de Vivre moored on the Nivernais Canal

History
- Name: L'Art de Vivre
- Owner: European Waterways, LTD
- Operator: European Waterways, LTD
- Port of registry: (France) Bourdeaux
- Route: Nivernais Canal: Auxerre to Clamecy
- Launched: 1917
- Christened: Marie Brizzard
- Status: In service

General characteristics
- Type: Hotel barge
- Tonnage: 100 tons
- Length: 100 ft (30 m)
- Beam: 16.5 ft (5.0 m)
- Height: 11.5 ft (3.5 m)
- Draught: 4.6 ft (1.4 m)
- Decks: 1
- Installed power: 2 × 220 V generators
- Propulsion: Main engine 150 hp (110 kW) Baudoin
- Speed: Maximum 10 knots (19 km/h; 12 mph)
- Capacity: 8 passengers
- Crew: 4
- Notes: Holds 10 tons of water, 2 tons of fuel

L'Art de Vivre (The Art of Living) was built in 1917 in Deptford, England, as a cargo barge but serves as a luxury hotel barge owned and operated by European Waterways. She is one of around 60 hotel barges operating on European waterways, mostly on the smaller French canals.

== History ==
Originally christened as Marie Brizzard, her purpose was to ferry ammunition to the beaches of Normandy to help the Allies fighting at the Somme. She was built particularly strong to resist the English Channel's harsh weather conditions and groundings on a Normandy beach. By the early 1940s, she had acquired the name ‘Mage’ and was a cargo barge on the River Seine, transporting heavy goods such as coal, gravel and sand. In 1944 the ship was used by Free French to transport resistance and rifles. After the end of World War II, she was moved round the north and west coasts of France and into the River Charente estuary to Rochefort. Here, she delivered barrels of cognac from Angoulême to Rochefort. She was renamed Mage, Cognac, Royal Cognac, Napoleon, Mark Twain, Magellan, and Kir Royal.

In 1975, she was converted into a hotel barge by Florian Waleski, who operated the hotel barge until 1997, when she was purchased by European Waterways. After an interior refit of the cabins and galley, L'Art de Vivre was for the next ten years the only hotel barge to navigate the shallow reaches of the upper Nivernais Canal in Burgundy. In 2008, she underwent a third refit and over $200,000 was invested in four new cabins.

== Amenities ==
L'Art de Vivre has four double cabins allowing her to carry up to eight passengers. She also has separate crew quarters which house the crew of four people. The crew consists of the captain and pilot, deck hand, and tour guide, housekeeper, and master chef.
