= La Belle Epoque (barge) =

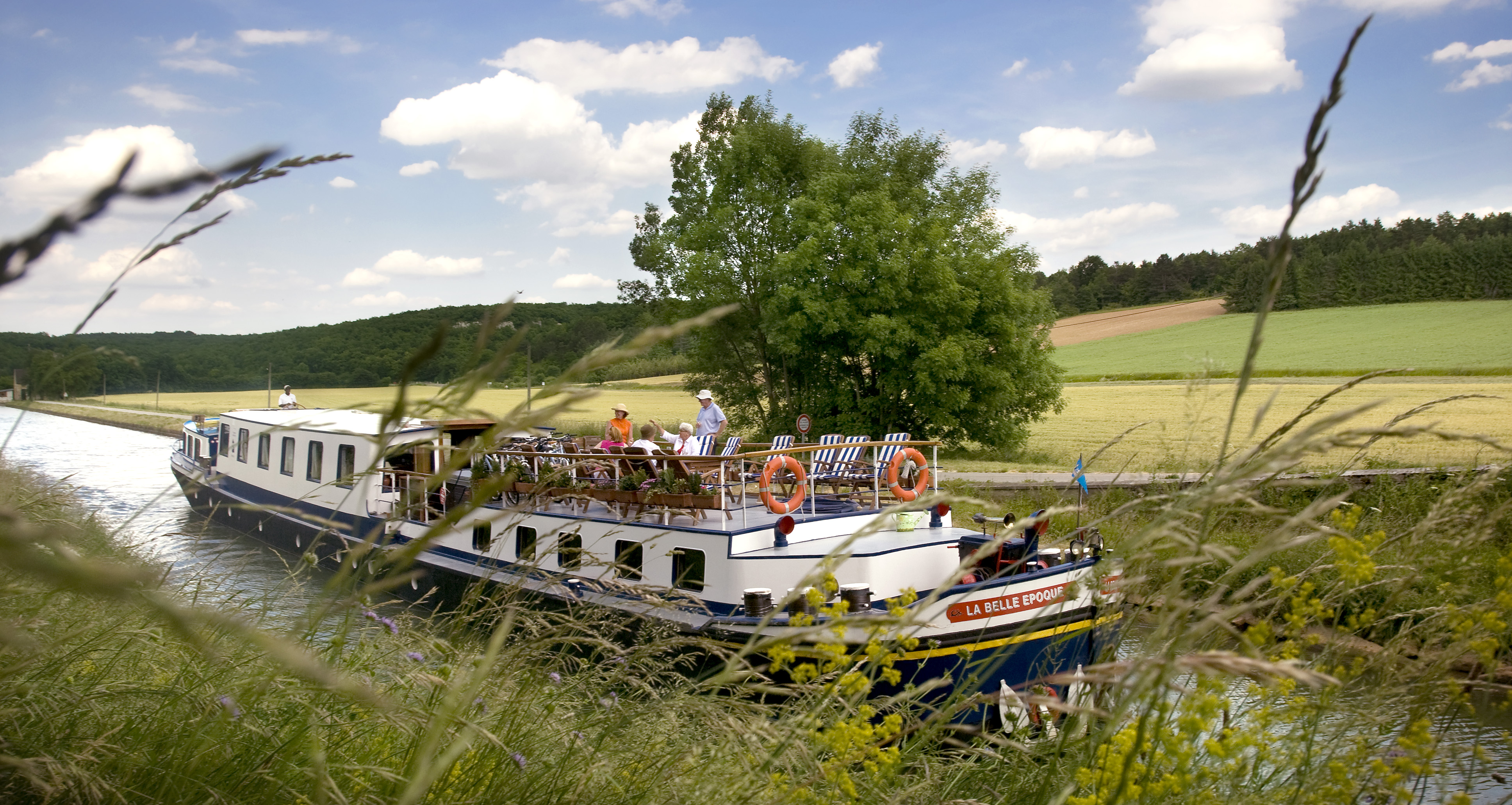
- The boutique hotel barge La Belle Epoque, cruising along the Canal de Bourgogne

History

France
- Name: La Belle Epoque
- Owner: European Waterways
- Operator: European Waterways
- Port of registry: Bordeaux
- Route: Burgundy Canal: Pouillenay to Tonnerre
- Launched: 1930
- Christened: Savornin Lohmann
- Status: In service

General characteristics
- Class & type: Commercial passenger vessel
- Tonnage: 200 tons
- Length: 126 ft (38 m)
- Beam: 16.5 ft (5.0 m)
- Height: 11.5 ft (3.5 m)
- Draught: 4.1 ft (1.2 m)
- Decks: 3
- Installed power: 3 x 220 volt generators (silent night)
- Propulsion: 150 HP M.A.N.
- Speed: Maximum speed 10 knots
- Capacity: 13 passengers
- Crew: 5 crew
- Notes: Fuel capacity 3 tons, water capacity 20 tons

La Belle Epoque is a barge of the Belgian spits category. She was built in 1930 to carry (mainly) timber. Renovated in 1995, she operates as a hotel barge on the Burgundy Canal in central France.

== History ==
La Belle Epoque was built in the Netherlands in 1930, her original name being Savornin Lohmann and the original owner was Leendert Kruijt. When World War II broke out, the Kruijt family moved with their barge to France and started carrying timber along the canals and rivers of France. The timber from the Morvan pine forests was floated in rafts down the upper reaches of the river Yonne to Clamecy on the Nivernais Canal. The trimmed lumber that the Savornin loaded was shipped to Paris and beyond as far as Berlin. For the duration of the war, the Savornin aided the French Resistance by secretly transporting stranded allied pilots to safety. This trade gradually ceased and the barge's cargo-carrying days came to an end in 1993, when the Kruijts decided to sell the barge and retire. The barge escaped the destiny of many old working barges – being sold for scrap – when she was purchased in 1995 by European Waterways who renamed her La Belle Epoque and renovated her to operate as a hotel barge.

== Hotel barge ==
La Belle Epoque undertakes cruises on the Canal de Bourgogne between Pouillenay and Tonnerre. She can carry up to 12 passengers and six crew. She is owned and operated by European Waterways.
