= La Clef Champs-Élysées Paris =

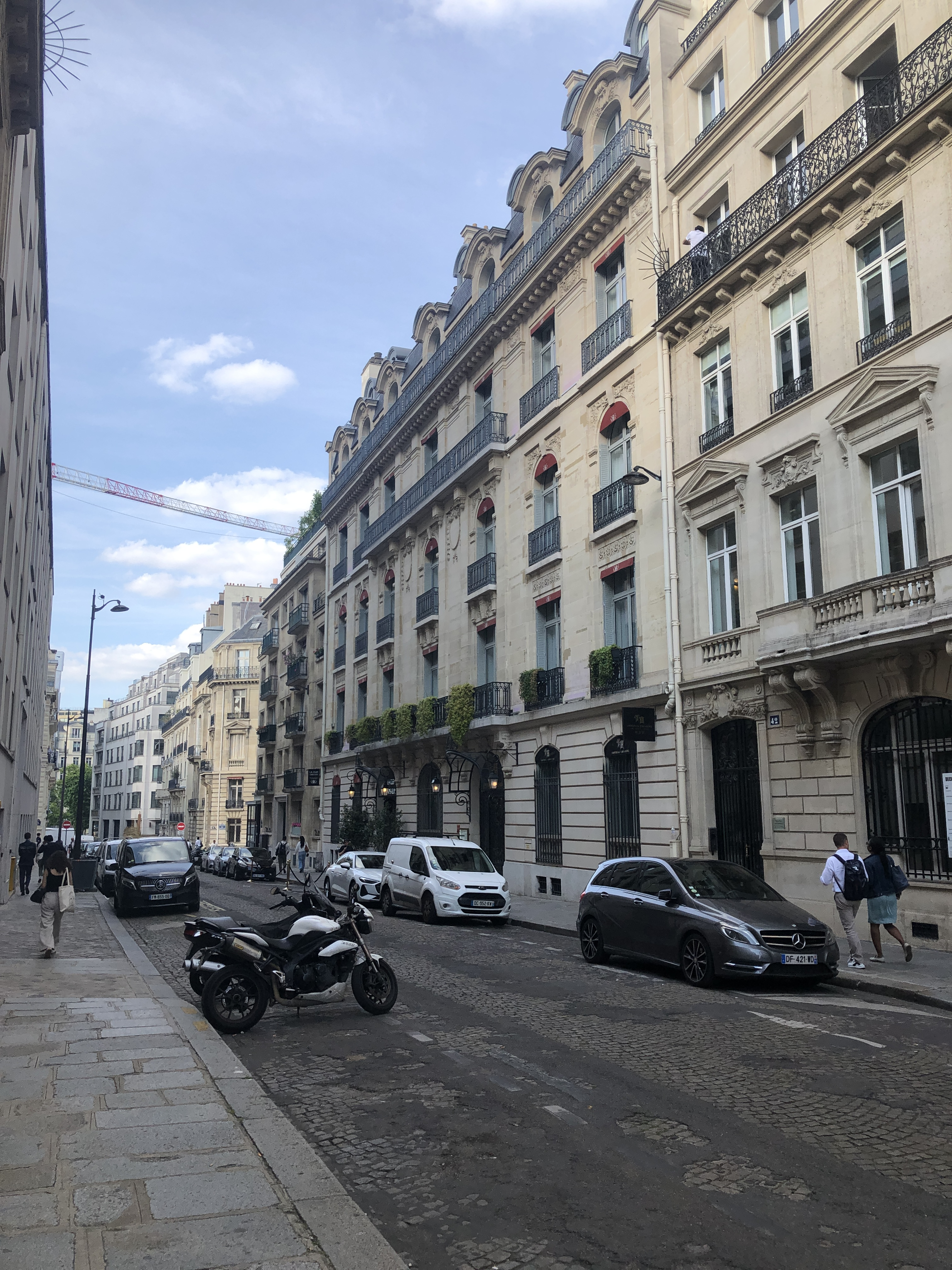
- La Clef, center with red awnings

General information
- Architectural style: Haussmann
- Location: 46 Rue de Bassano
- Coordinates: 48°52′14″N 2°17′58″E
- Year built: 1907
- Opened: February 17, 2019
- Owner: The Ascott Limited

Technical details
- Material: limestone
- Floor count: 5

Design and construction
- Architects: Félix Le Nevé and Albert d’Hont (original estate); Jean-Philippe Nuel (hotel, modern interior)

La Clef Champs-Élysées Paris (lit. 'The Champs-Élysées Key') is a French five star hotel located at 46 Rue de Bassano just off the Champs-Élysées in Paris' 8th arrondissement, that is part of The Crest Collection owned and operated by The Ascott Limited, a subsidiary of the government of Singapore.

== History ==
The site that would become La Clef spans from 44 to 46 Rue de Bassano, which was subject to Baron Haussmann’s mid-1800s modernization of Paris and was the site of several private mansions. The earliest record of what stood on the site comes in 1877 with one such mansion being built at 44 Rue de Bassano.

=== Hennessy mansion ===
The building currently occupied by La Clef was built in 1907 by James Hennessy a member of the politically active Hennessy family of their titular cognac's fame. The building was designed by architects Félix Le Nevé and Albert d’Hont and is in a typical Haussmann style. Upon its completion it was awarded the "finest Paris façade that year" and won a municipal architectural contest. The five-story estate had high molded ceilings, decorative friezes, and gilded detailing typical of the Belle Époque. Hennessy would often host extravagant balls and galas at the estate, earning it the nickname the salle Washington by the 1930s.

Following Hennessy's death in 1945 and broader redevelopments post World War II, the property would be sold by the Hennessy family and was subdivided into upscale apartments and offices, being owned by Gecina for most of the time prior to its sale to The Ascott. As part of the subdivision process, most of the interior of the building was renovated, with only the facade and the wrought iron balcony railings remaining.

=== Hotel ===
In 2012 the building was sold to a institutional investor who then sold it to Ascott in 2017. The building would see a total internal renovation from 2017 to 2019 which was designed by architect Jean-Philippe Nuel who prided his design on returning to its Hennessy opulence, preserving and restoring many of the molded ceilings, fixtures, and details. Additionally, the former carriage entrance, and later car entrance and parking, would be renovated into the hotel's lobby and a courtyard. The hotel opened in 2019 as the third and final entry of "La Clef" sister hotels, which includes La Clef Louvre Paris and La Clef Tour Effiel Paris, all part of Ascott's luxury Crest collection.

== Accommodations ==
La Clef has 63 rooms and suites and seven apartments and duplexes and is rated five stars. On the ground floor of La Clef is a Chinese restaurant Imperial Treasure noted in the Michelin Guide, but without a star. The hotel also has a fitness room, airport transportation services, 24-hour concierge service, and daily breakfast.

U.S. News & World Report ranked La Clef the 114th best hotel in Paris, the 317th in France and 3111th best in Europe overall, earning a gold badge, but noting some guests weren't impressed by its accommodations for its price. The Daily Telegraph rated the hotel 8/10, noting its "privileged location", only a 10 minute walk to the Arc de Triomphe, and that its rooms are "spacious by Paris standards."

== See also ==
- The Ascott Limited
- Champs-Élysées
- List of hotels: Countries F
