= Saint Louis (hotel barge) =

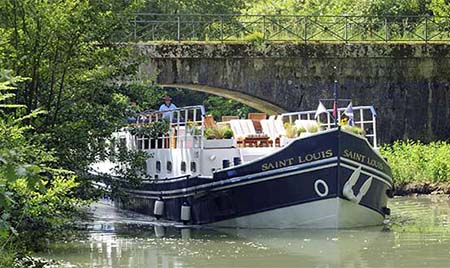
- Hotel barge Saint Louis on the Canal de Garonne.

History

France
- Name: Saint Louis
- Owner: SARL Saint Louis Barge
- Operator: Owner operated
- Port of registry: Lyon
- Route: Canal de Garonne and Canal de Montech - Montauban to Agen to Castets-en-Dorthe; Midi-Pyrénées and Aquitaine
- Builder: Gebr. Boot, Alphen a/d Rijn
- Launched: 1923
- Status: in active service

General characteristics
- Class & type: Commercial passenger vessel
- Tonnage: 127
- Length: 29.2 m (96 ft)
- Beam: 5 m (16 ft)
- Height: 3.2 m (10 ft)
- Draught: 1.2 m (3.9 ft)
- Decks: 2
- Installed power: 2 x generators – Lister Petter Diesel 380Volt 14 KVA and Honda 220Volt 4.5 KVA
- Propulsion: GM 6V72 diesel motor, 180 H.P
- Speed: Canal cruising speed 3 knots, Maximum speed 8 knots
- Capacity: 6 passengers
- Crew: 4 crew
- Notes: Fuel capacity 3,000 litres, Water capacity 10,000 litres; 6 person Bombard Commando tender with 6HP Mercury outboard

Saint Louis (named for Louis IX of France, later canonised) is a Luxemotor hotel barge, on the Canal de Garonne in South West France.

== History ==
Built in 1923 by Gebroeders Boot in Alphen aan den Rijn in the Netherlands, Saint Louis was a bulk carrier and served on the Dutch inland seas and waterways carrying cargoes of grain and gravel until around 1985. At that time she was converted for use as a supply vessel in the port of Amsterdam, using the name Supplier 2. In 1994 she was sold and then converted into a hotel barge.
