= Rosa (barge) =

Hotel barge

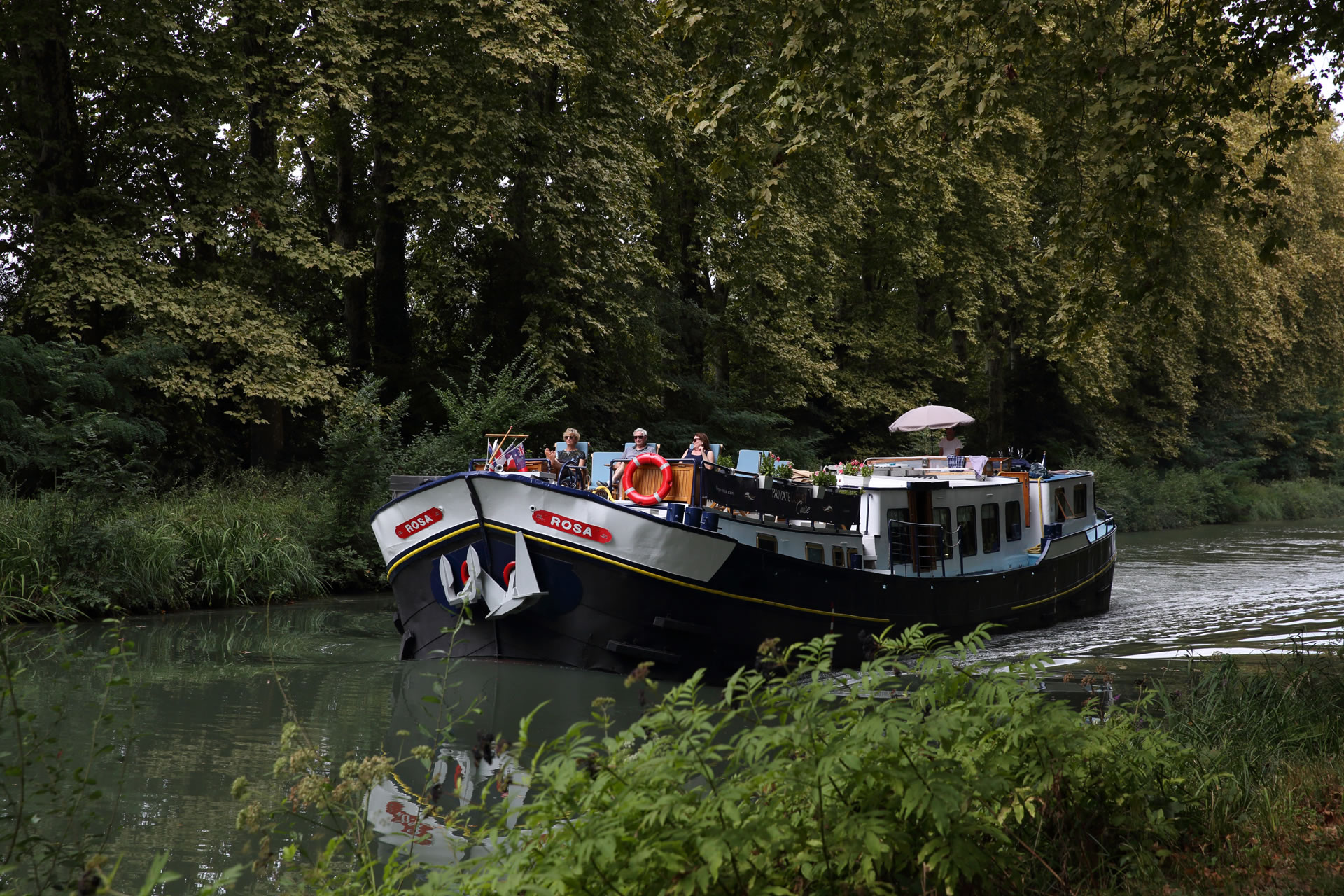
- Rosa cruising the Canal de Garonne

History

France
- Name: Rosa
- Owner: Dominique Monclus
- Operator: Rives du Sud
- Port of registry: Castelsarrasin
- Route: Canal de Garonne
- Launched: 1907
- Status: In service

General characteristics
- Class & type: Commercial passenger vessel
- Tonnage: 120
- Length: 98 ft (30 m)
- Beam: 16.3 ft (5.0 m)
- Height: 3.5 m (11 ft)
- Draught: 1.6 m (5.2 ft)
- Decks: 2
- Installed power: 2 x 220 volts generators 9 kW and 17 kW
- Propulsion: Deutz SA6M512 120H.P.
- Speed: Maximum 8 km/h
- Capacity: 8 passengers
- Crew: 4 crew
- Notes: Holds 10 tons of water and 3 tons of fuel

Rosa is a French hotel barge of Dutch origin. Since 1990 she has been offering cruises to international tourists on the Canal de Garonne in the Nouvelle Aquitaine region of South West France. The waterway authority Voies Navigables de France reported in 2014 that there were around 80 hotel barges operating on the inland waterways. They keep alive the tradition of the boatmen (mariniers) whose numbers have declined in number from thousands in the post-World War II years to just a few hundred today.

== History ==
Rosa was built in Dedemsvaart, the Netherlands, in 1907, as a klipper style barge. On march 1918 she was sezied by the Entente and used to transport allied equipment and troops. She was converted to a hotel barge in 1990, to cruise on the Canal de Garonne. She was initially named Renaissance. She was refurbished in 2010.

== Hotel barge ==
Rosa has four double cabins allowing it to carry up to 8 passengers. She also has separate crew quarters which house the crew of four. The crew consists of the tour director, pilot, chef, and housekeeper.

Rosa, along with the Anjodi, was featured in the 10-part BBC Series about Chef Rick Stein's six-week journey from Bordeaux to Marseille aboard the Rosa on the Canal de Garonne and Canal du Midi.
