= Anjodi =

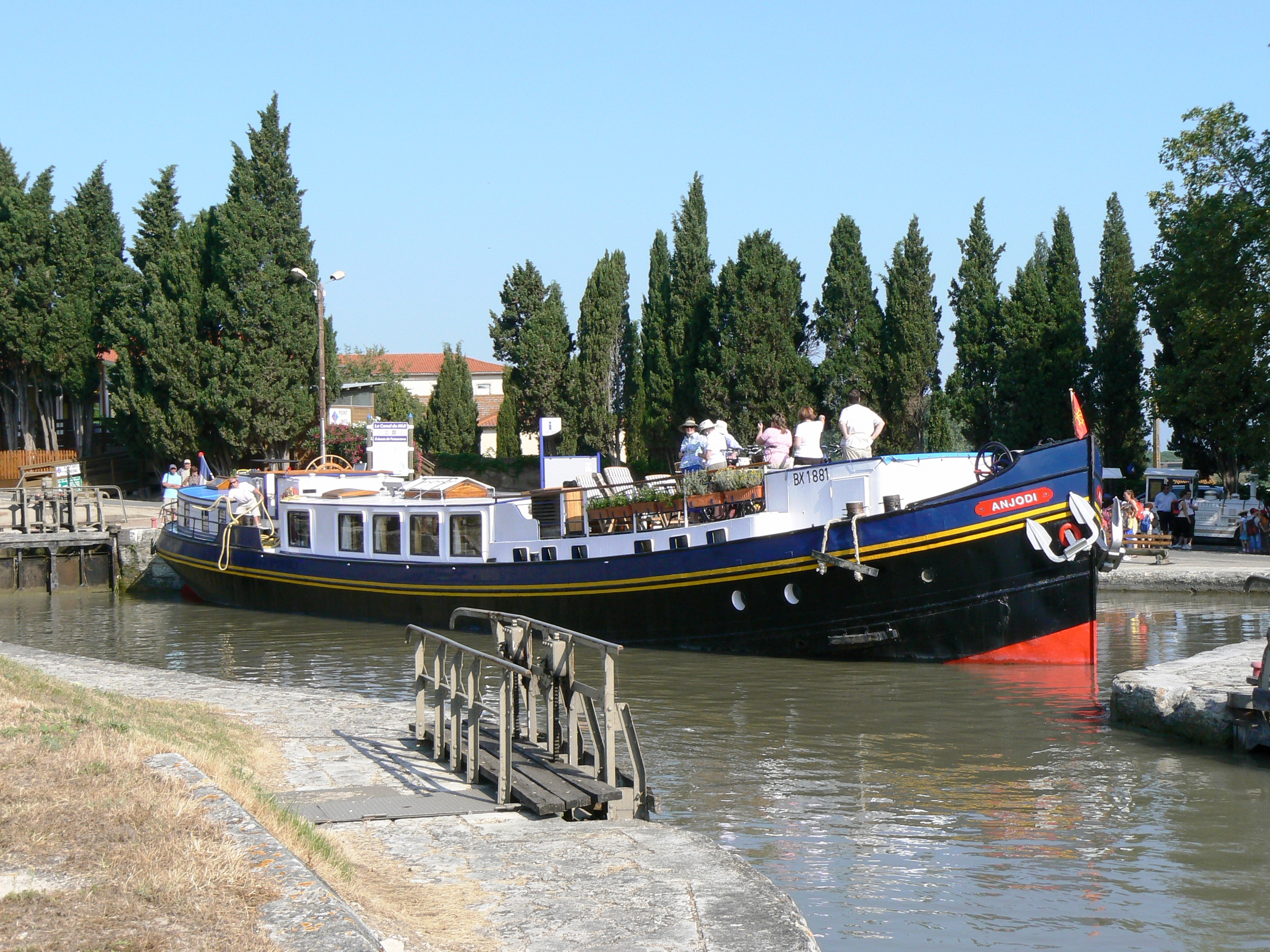
- Anjodi in the Fonserannes staircase locks, Béziers, France

History

France
- Name: Anjodi
- Owner: European Waterways Ltd
- Operator: European Waterways Ltd
- Port of registry: Bordeaux
- Route: Canal du Midi - Le Somail to Marseillan
- Launched: 1929
- Status: In service

General characteristics
- Class & type: Commercial passenger vessel
- Tonnage: 198
- Length: 100 ft (30 m)
- Beam: 16.5 ft (5.0 m)
- Height: 10 ft (3.0 m)
- Draught: 5 ft (1.5 m)
- Decks: 2
- Installed power: 2 × 220 volt diesel generators 40 kva and 25 kva
- Propulsion: single 185 horse power Perkins turbo charged diesel
- Speed: cruising speed 4 knots (7.4 km/h), Maximum speed 11 knots (20 km/h)
- Capacity: 8 passengers
- Crew: 4 crew
- Notes: Fuel capacity 3000 litres, Water capacity 10,000 litres, Grey water capacity 1200 litres

Anjodi was built to carry freight on the waterways of the Netherlands, Belgium and France but has been converted to a hotel barge.

== History ==
Anjodi is a Luxe motor Dutch steel barge built as a trading barge in Groningen, Netherlands in 1929 and originally carried grain. She was constructed of iron with a high copper content which has contributed to her longevity. She got the name Anjodi in 1963 after the names of the three children of the original owner, Tiemen de Weerd: Andries, Johan and Diana.

Anjodi was purchased by Derek Banks in 1982 from a Dutchman, Fopa de Jong, in Amsterdam. She was a retired trading barge and full of old World War II aircraft instruments. The refit in 1982-1983, by European Waterways, made Anjodi one of France's first ever hotel barges. Before making the three-month trip from the Netherlands to the south of France, Anjodi was towed to a shipyard in Belgium where tanks for fresh water, generators, wiring and plumbing were installed and a shell infrastructure of steel was built. She is refurbished on an annual basis and currently operates on the Canal du Midi in southern France.

== Hotel barge ==
Anjodi has four guest bedrooms with private bathrooms and a saloon. Crews' quarters are in the bow and stern. The Anjodi has a crew of four: captain, first mate or matelot/tour guide, chef, and hostess.

Anjodi was featured in the 10 part BBC Series about Chef Rick Stein’s six week journey from Bordeaux to Marseille aboard the Anjodi on the Canal latéral à la Garonne and Canal du Midi. Famous guests who have travelled on the Anjodi include Rod Stewart.
