= Magna Carta (barge) =

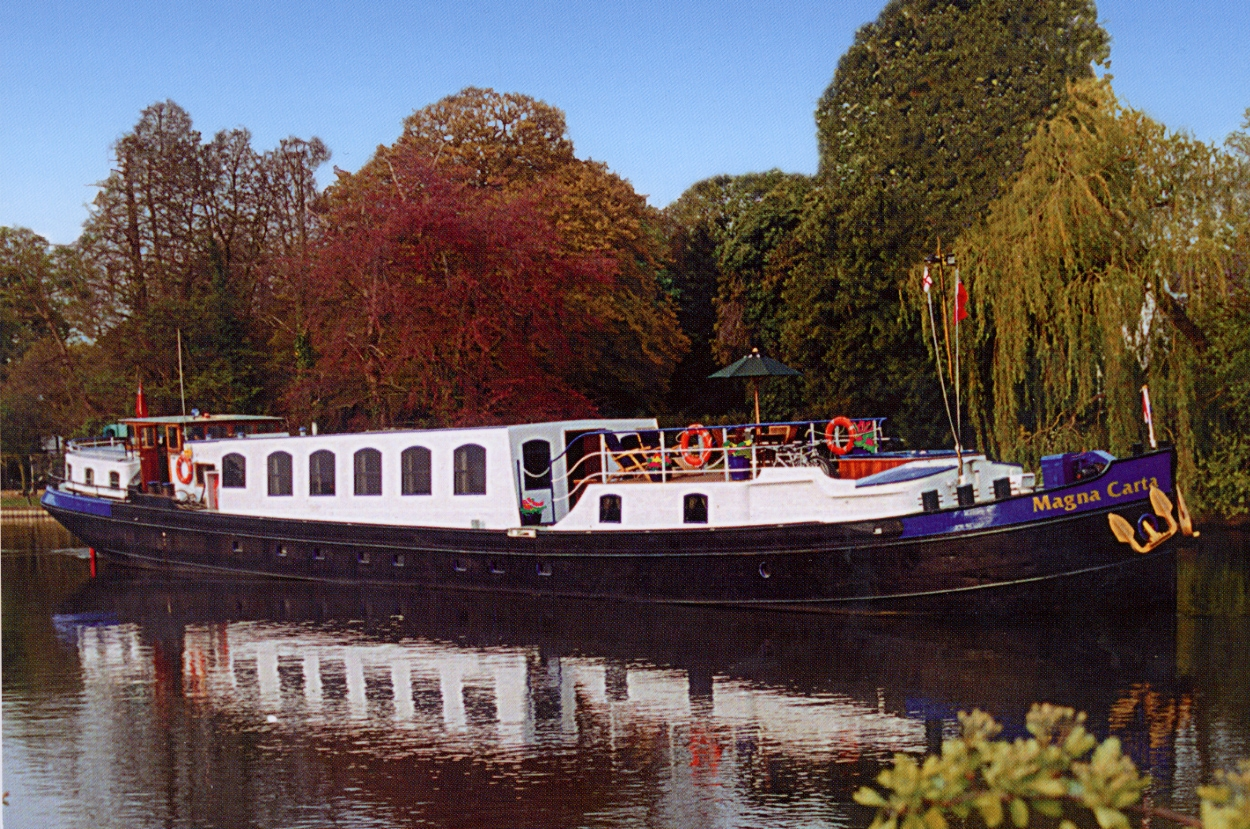
- Magna Carta

History

United Kingdom
- Name: Magna Carta
- Route: River Thames
- Launched: 1936
- Christened: Pia
- Status: In service

General characteristics
- Class & type: Commercial passenger vessel
- Tonnage: 225
- Length: 117 ft (36 m)
- Beam: 16.5 ft (5.0 m)
- Decks: 2
- Installed power: 230-volt 60KVA generator and inverters for silent night power
- Propulsion: Scania 218 HP
- Speed: Maximum 10 knots
- Capacity: 8 passengers
- Crew: Captain and 4 crew
- Notes: Holds 10 tons of water and 3 tons of fuel

Magna Carta was built in the Netherlands in 1936. She was converted from a sand carrying cargo vessel to a hotel barge in 2001–2002 after 65 years carrying cargo for the same family. The barge conversion was designed and managed by Dominic Read, one of the new owners.

Magna Carta has four double cabins allowing her to carry up to eight passengers. She also has separate crew quarters which house the crew of four. The crew consists of the captain, two hostesses, chef, and tour guide.
