= Savoir Faire (barge) =

Hotel barge

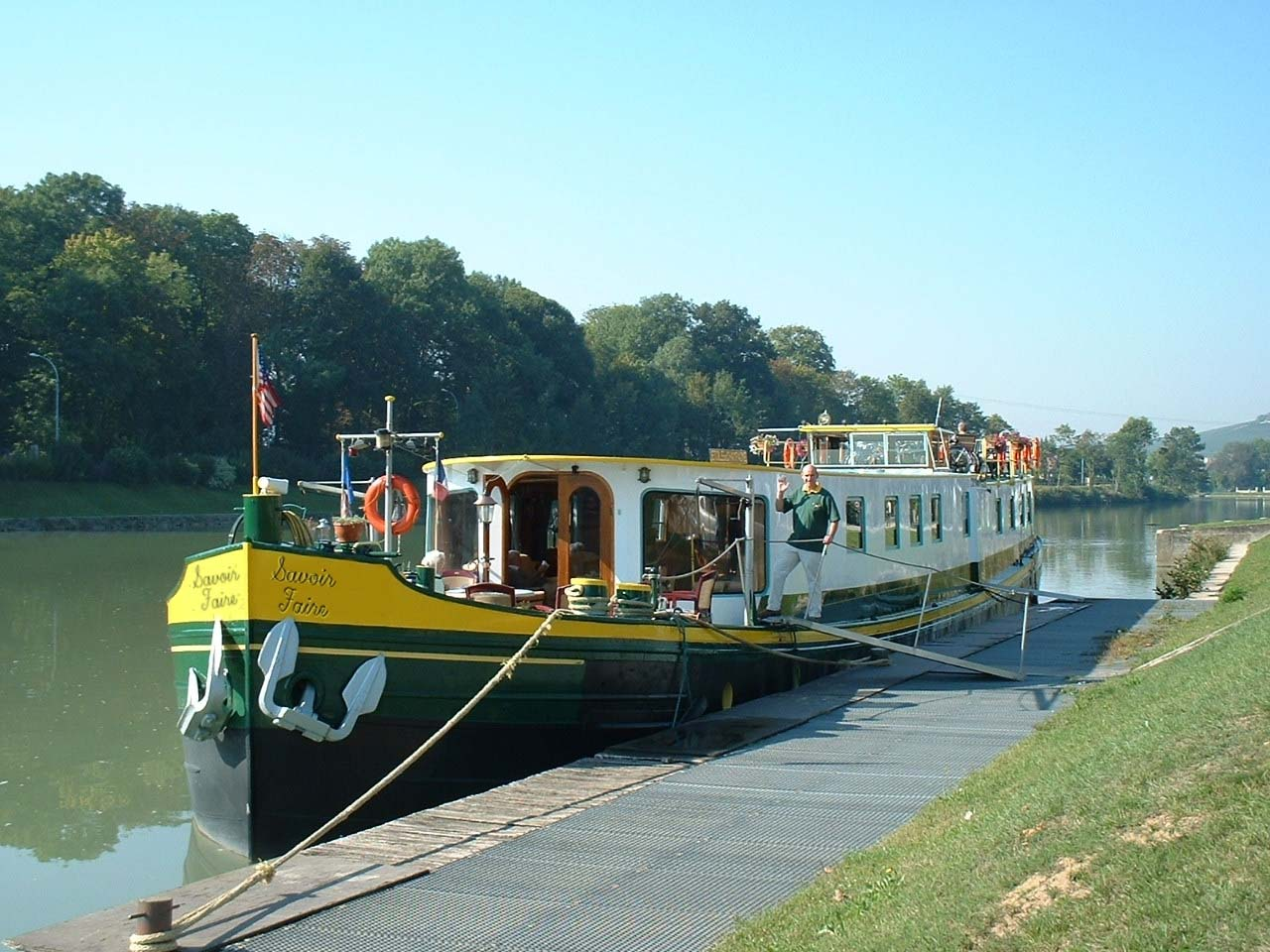
- Savoir Faire

History

France
- Name: Savoir Faire
- Operator: Christopher Bennett
- Launched: 1932
- Status: In service

General characteristics
- Class & type: Commercial passenger vessel
- Tonnage: 200
- Length: 39.40 m (129.3 ft)
- Beam: 5.07 m (16.6 ft)
- Height: 3.85 m (12.6 ft)
- Draught: 1.48 m (4.9 ft)
- Decks: 3
- Installed power: Two soundproofed water-cooled generators with a total output of 110 kw.
- Propulsion: 175 HP DAF
- Speed: 12-14 knots maximum
- Capacity: 12 passengers
- Crew: 6 crew

Savoir Faire was built to carry freight on the waterways of the Netherlands, Belgium and France but has been converted to act as a hotel barge.

== History ==
Savoir Faire was built in Amsterdam in 1932. It originally carried cargo in the Netherlands and Belgium. During World War II, it served as a troop carrier. It was converted to a hotel barge in 1976 and now serves as a hotel barge. The barge cruises in France, the Netherlands, and Belgium, at present most frequently on the Canal de Briare and the Canal latéral à la Loire.
