= Nymphea =

Cargo ship

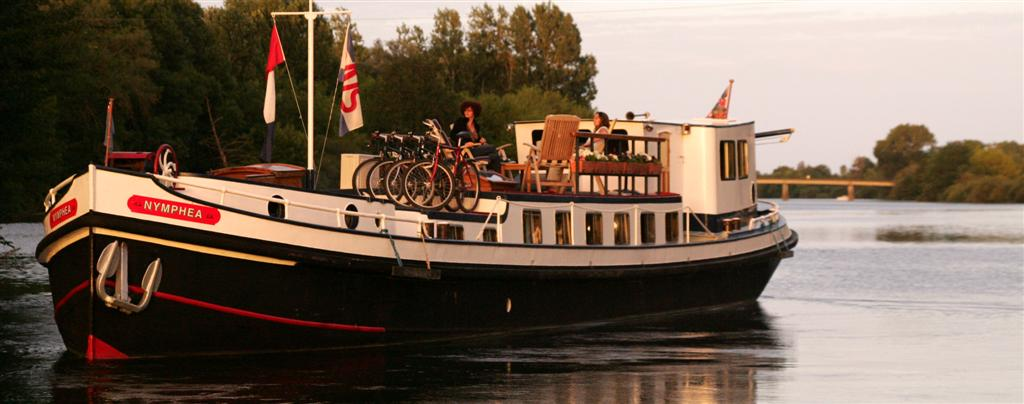
- Nymphea

History

France
- Name: Nymphea
- Owner: Leigh Wootton
- Operator: Wootton, LTD
- Port of registry: Vermenton
- Route: River Cher in the Loire Valley: Nitray to Montrichard
- Launched: 1921
- Christened: Nymphea
- Status: In service

General characteristics
- Class & type: Commercial passenger vessel
- Tonnage: 80 tons
- Length: 24.5 m (80 ft)
- Beam: 4.20 m (13.8 ft)
- Height: 3.15 m (10.3 ft)
- Draught: 1.0 m (3.3 ft)
- Decks: 2
- Installed power: 10kva Hawker Siddeley
- Propulsion: DAF 615, 120 hp
- Speed: Maximum 14 knots
- Capacity: 6 passengers
- Crew: 3 crew

Nymphea is a classic Dutch style river barge with shallow draught. She was built in 1921 to carry cargo along the canals of Europe and presently serves as a hotel barge in France.

== History ==
Nymphea originally carried barley and hops from Rotterdam to a brewery in the northern part of the Netherlands and would return with bottles and barrels of beer, making one round trip per week. The original owner had seven children and lived in the bow cabin with his wife, and at maximum, five of the children at a time. She barge was first converted in 1978 to carry 20 scouts in hammocks. She was then converted to a hotel barge in 1985. Nymphea has since traveled from the Netherlands to Bordeaux, on most of the French waterways. She was the first hotel barge on the southern Canal du Nivernais and the River Seille. She has also been to Barcelona and Monte Carlo by sea. She was moved in 1990 to the isolated River Cher on a trailer. In 2005, part of the Rick Stein's French Odyssey for the BBC was filmed on board.
