= Enchanté =

Hotel barge in France

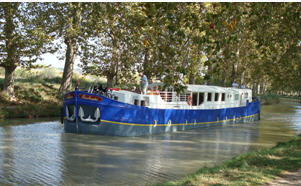
- Enchanté hotel barge on the Canal du Midi.

History

France
- Name: Enchanté
- Owner: European Waterways Ltd
- Operator: European Waterways Ltd
- Port of registry: Toulouse
- Route: Canal du Midi - Béziers to Homps; Provence - Agde to Avignon
- Launched: 1958
- Christened: Maria
- Status: In service

General characteristics
- Class & type: Commercial passenger vessel
- Tonnage: 165
- Length: 100 ft (30 m)
- Beam: 17 ft (5.2 m)
- Height: 10.5 ft (3.2 m)
- Draught: 4.3 ft (1.3 m)
- Decks: 3
- Installed power: 2 × 380 volt diesel generators 30 kva and 19 kva
- Propulsion: Single 280 horse power Cummins diesel engine. N855
- Speed: Canal cruising speed 3 knots, Maximum speed 10 knots
- Capacity: 8 passengers
- Crew: 4 crew
- Notes: Fuel capacity 4000 litres, Water capacity 8,000 litres, Used water capacity 4000 litres

Enchanté (French: Nice to meet you, literally: 'enchanted') is a Belgian-built barge of the spits category, originally named Maria, converted into a hotel barge. She is one of around 50 hotel barges operating on the French waterways.

== History ==
Enchanté was built in Oostkamp Belgium in 1958 as a trading barge, 39.50m in length. She carried grain, carbon, chemicals and other bulk goods. She was christened Maria and was renamed several times before finally being registered in France under the name Enchanté, in 2009. She is constructed of steel with a high carbon content, which was more common in pre-war barges. Although slightly more brittle, this type of steel has excellent anti-corrosion properties.

Enchanté was refitted for her new purpose in 2009, for a total of €500,000.

After the plans were drawn up by the Parisian naval architects Technicarene, Enchanté was transformed at the Chantier Naval de Meuse et Sambre in Belgium in 2008/09. She was reduced to 30.00m in length, to suit the Canal du Midi, with its shorter locks and low curved bridges. She is one of only two Midi passenger barges with two interior decks.

== Layout and accommodation ==
Enchanté has four guest bedrooms, a saloon, demonstration kitchen and Jacuzzi for guests. Crew quarters are in the bow and stern. The Enchanté has a crew of five: Captain, first mate/tour guide or matelot, chef, and two hostesses.
