= Pouillenay =

- Commune
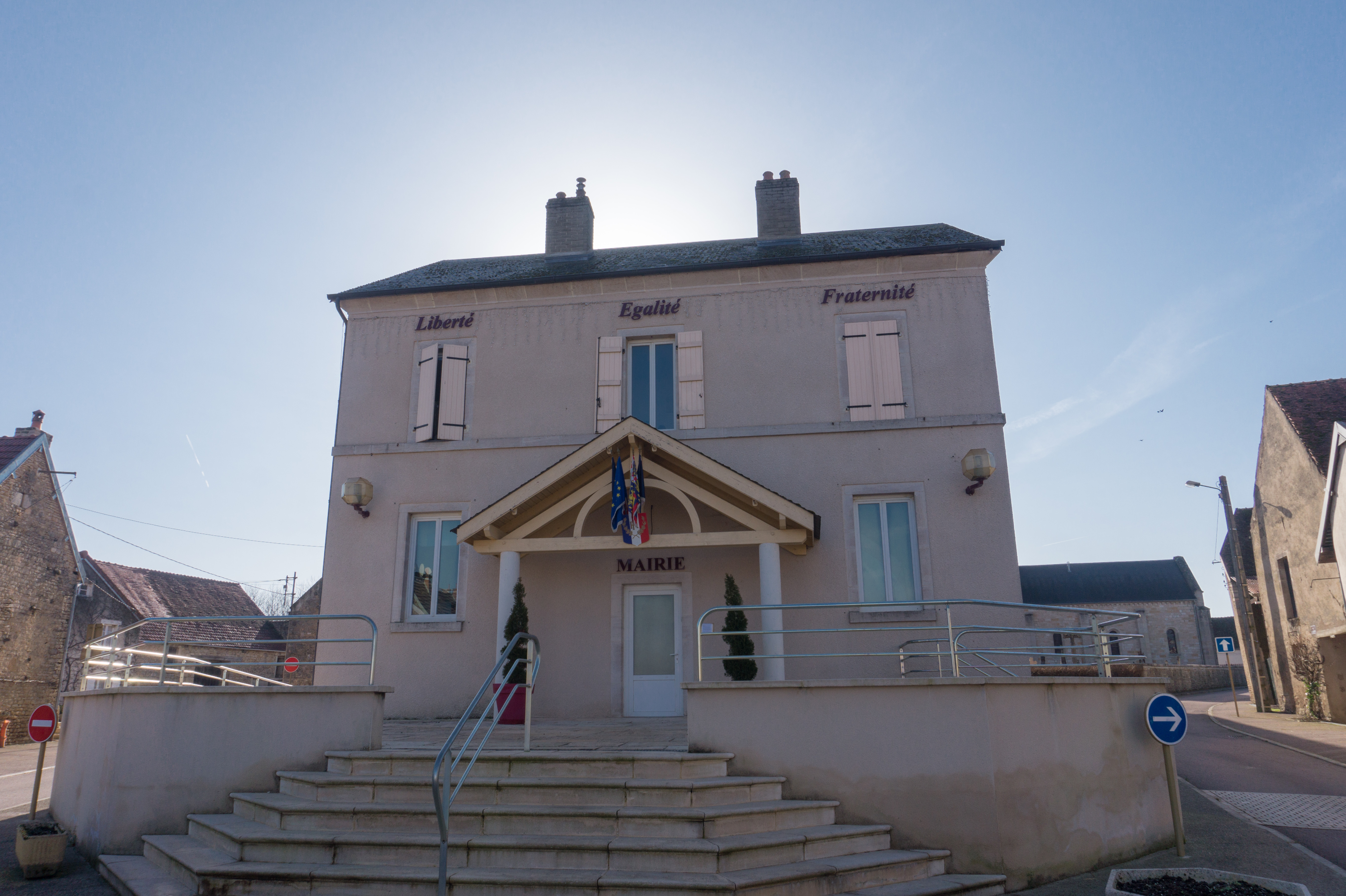
- Town hall
- Location of Pouillenay
- Location within France Location within Bourgogne-Franche-Comté
- Coordinates: 47°30′29″N 4°28′09″E
- Country: France
- Region: Bourgogne-Franche-Comté
- Department: Côte-d'Or
- Arrondissement: Montbard
- Canton: Montbard

Government
  - Mayor (2020–2026): Jean-Marc Rigaud
- Area^{1}: 15.04 km^{2} (5.81 sq mi)
- Elevation: 254 m (833 ft)
- Highest elevation: 447 m (1,467 ft)
- Lowest elevation: 239 m (784 ft)
- Population (2023): 605
  - Density: 40.2/km^{2} (104/sq mi)
- Time zone: UTC+01:00 (CET)
  - Summer (DST): UTC+02:00 (CEST)
- INSEE/Postal code: 21500 /21150
- ^{1} French Land Register data, which excludes lakes, ponds, glaciers > 1 km^{2} (0.386 sq mi or 247 acres) and river estuaries.

Pouillenay (French pronunciation: [pujnɛ]) is a commune in the Côte-d'Or department in eastern France.

== Population ==
Historical population
| Year | Pop. | ±% p.a. |
|---|---|---|
| 1968 | 636 | — |
| 1975 | 536 | −2.41% |
| 1982 | 481 | −1.53% |
| 1990 | 523 | +1.05% |
| 1999 | 538 | +0.31% |
| 2007 | 547 | +0.21% |
| 2012 | 588 | +1.46% |
| 2017 | 555 | −1.15% |
| 2023 | 605 | +1.45% |
Source: INSEE

== See also ==
- Communes of the Côte-d'Or department
