= La Voile d'Or =

Hotel in France

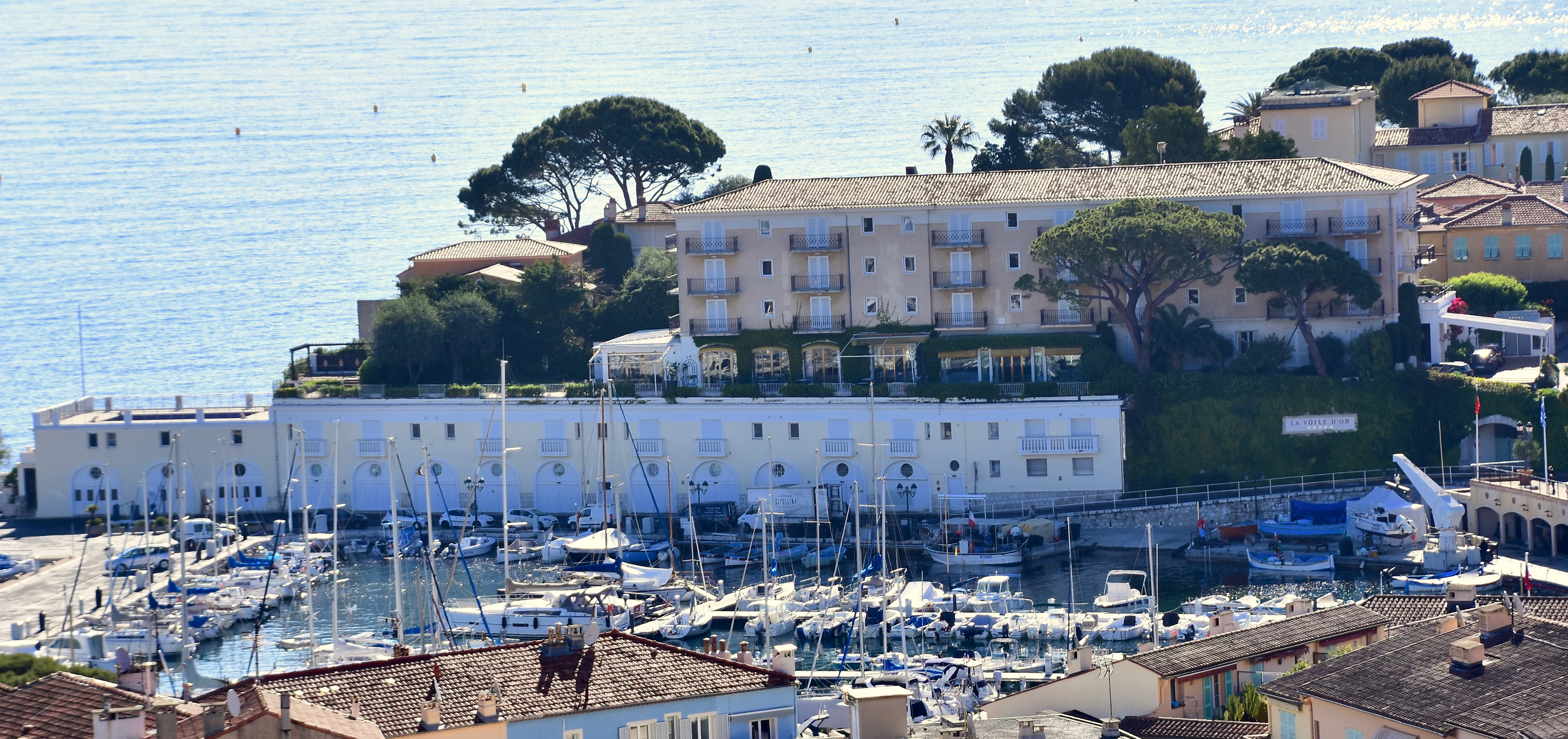

- Location within Provence-Alpes-Côte d'Azur La Voile d'Or (France)

General information
- Type: Hotel
- Location: Saint-Jean-Cap-Ferrat, France
- Coordinates: 43°41′17″N 7°20′13″E

Website
- https://www.lavoiledor.fr

La Voile d'Or is a hotel in Saint-Jean-Cap-Ferrat, France. The hotel is a seasonal establishment, open from May to October. It overlooks the nearby port. La Voile d'Or has become famous for its many celebrity guests over the years.

== History ==
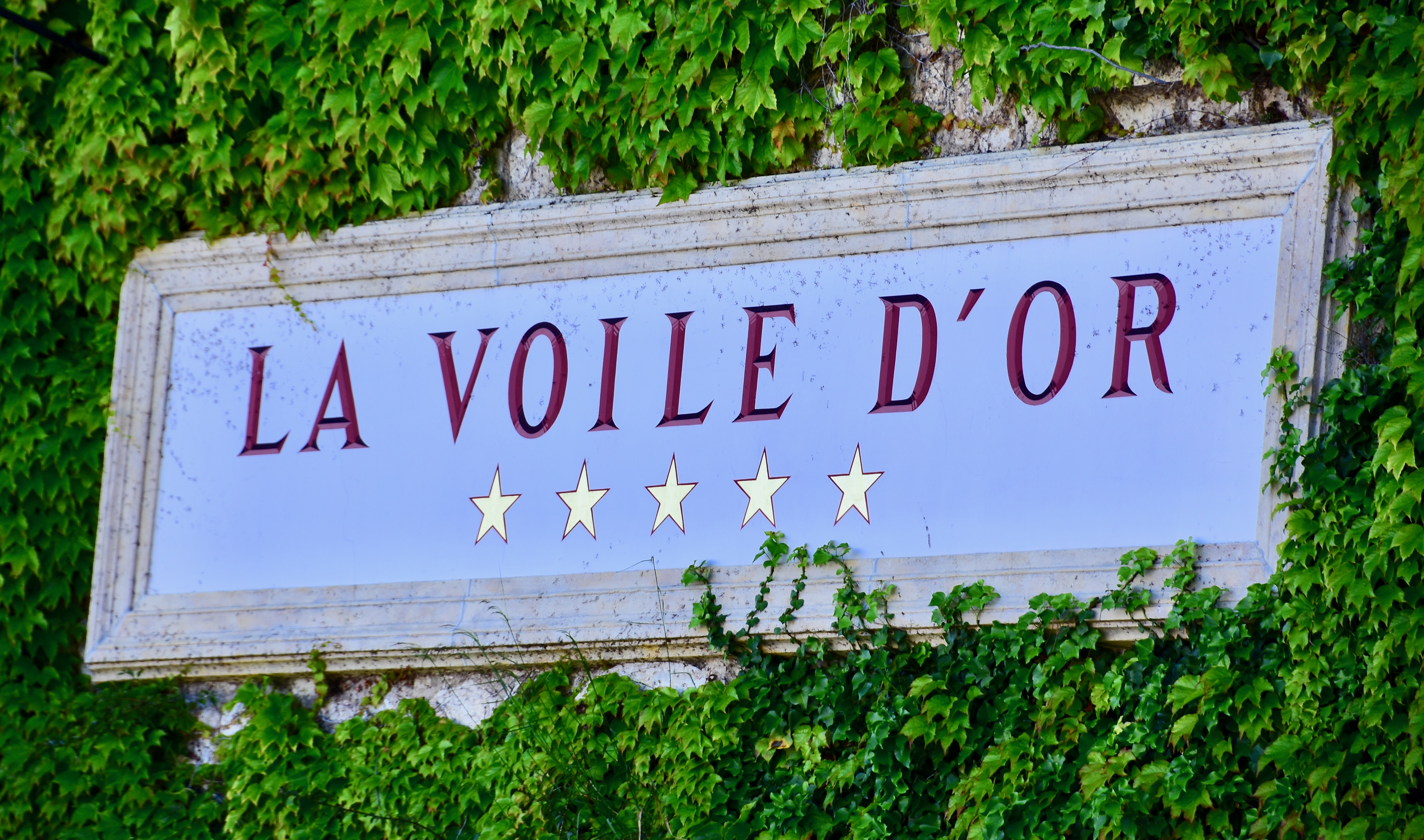
Sign displaying the hotel's 5 stars

In 1904, the customs house of Saint-Jean-Cap-Ferrat was demolished to make space for "l’hôtel du Parc". It was the first hotel in Saint-Jean-Cap-Ferrat. In 1914, the hotel was acquired by Paris Singer.

In 1925 or 1933, La Voile d'Or was bought by English golf champion Captain William Powell, the father of filmmaker Michael Powell. In 1964, Jean and Françis Lorenzi bought the hotel and instigated a two-year expansion, during which the hotel was closed to visitors. Until 2019, the hotel was owned by Jean's daughter Isabelle Lorenzi.

In 2017, the hotel was awarded its fifth star. Two years later, it was sold to a foreign company for €70 million.

== In popular culture ==
The hotel is famous for the many celebrities who have visited it. Poet Jean Cocteau once called it "a place where you sleep with your head resting on the sea". Other visitors include actors David Niven, Gregory Peck, and Jack Hawkins, singer Bono, and writer F. Scott Fitzgerald.

Parts of the first episode of British television series The Persuaders!, starring Roger Moore and Tony Curtis, were filmed at the hotel.
