= Luxe motor =

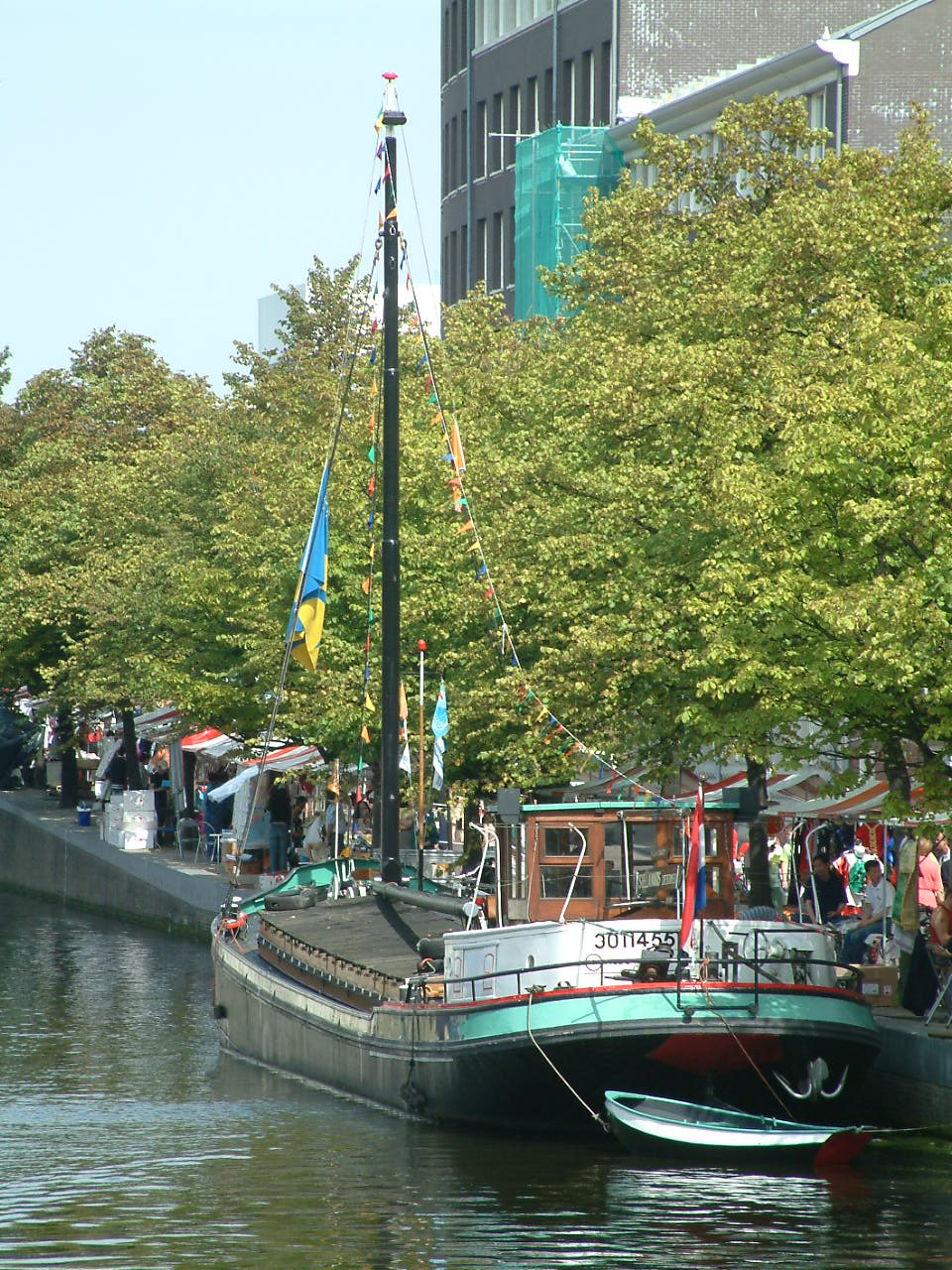
Luxe motor Stella Maris of 1929 ENI 03011455 in The Hague

A Luxe motor is a type of Dutch barge, built for the first time in the early 1920s. Most vessels had a straight bow ('Steilsteven') with characteristic upsweep of the gunwale and good accommodation for living at the back of the ship, from which the name derives. As constructed, luxe motor lengths range from 18 to 30 metres (59 ft 5/8 in to 98 ft 5 1/8 in) though many were lengthened in the 1950s to compete with the falling price of road transport. After commercial retirement the luxe hull is a popular choice for liveaboard and recreational use and many have been shortened to aid with handling or attract reduced mooring fees.

The luxe motor type rapidly supplanted the older aak and tjalk hull styles, offering straighter sides, a wider beam and lengths which exceeded the largest examples of the older hull styles, all of which contributed to a greater cargo capacity. In addition the "duck tail" transom, prop and rudder arrangement was better suited to diesel propulsion than the sail-optimised hulls of older types, though they do suffer from a pronounced "walk" effect when running aft. Typically they can carry 6–9 knots (6.9–10.4 mph; 11–17 km/h) through water, the hydrodynamics of the hull not being suited to higher speeds.

In commercial use the hold was originally covered by duck boards, wooden panels which could be removed to expose the hold for loading. This would then be covered with a tarpaulin. In the postwar period many adopted steel hatches instead for speed and longevity.
