= Hotel barge =

Barge that has been built or converted to serve as a hotel

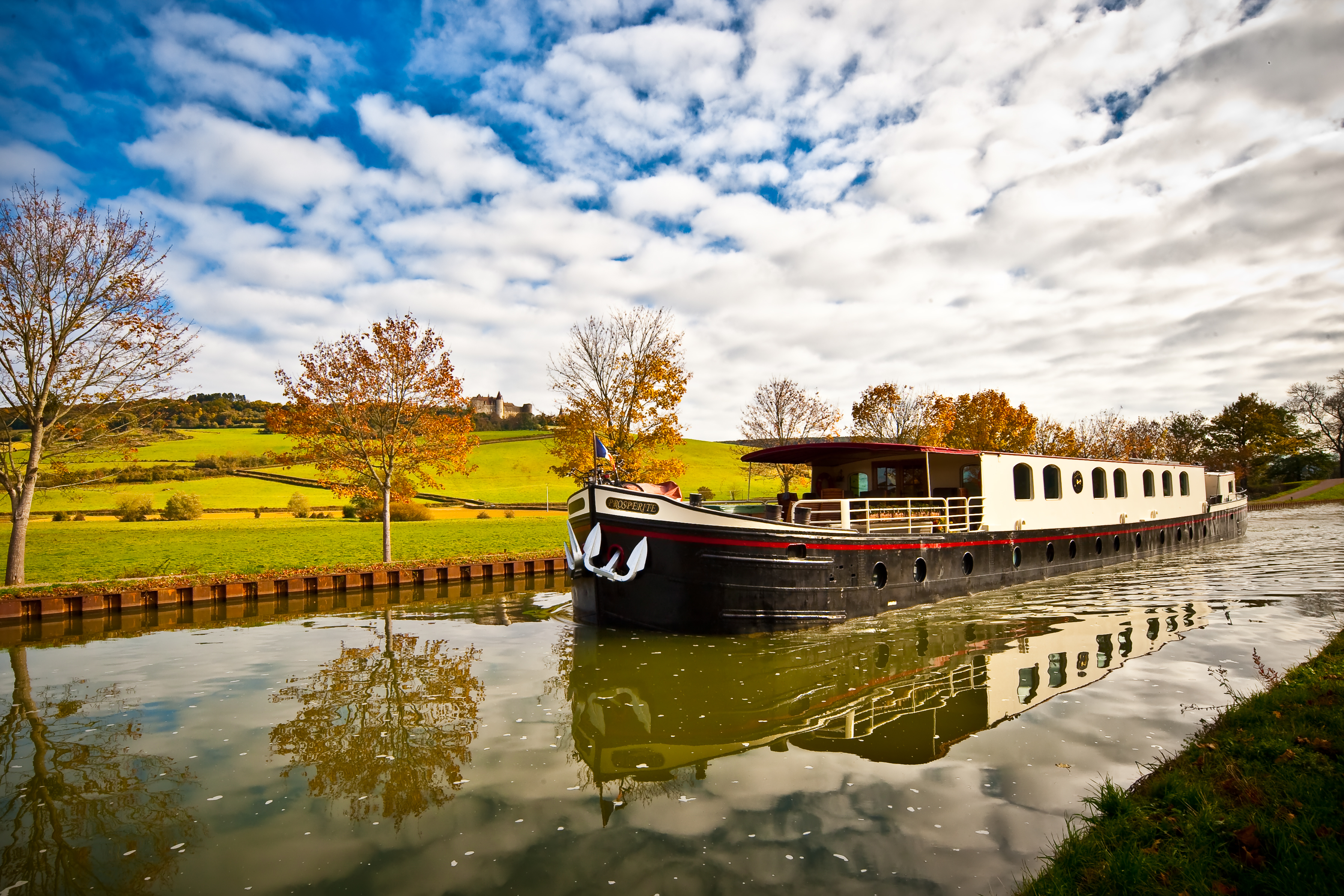
Prospérité Barge in Vandenesse-en-Auxois on Burgundy Canal. Château de Châteauneuf is on the hill in the background.

A hotel barge (fr. péniche hôtel) is a barge that has been built or converted to serve as a hotel or other kind of lodging. Hotel barges are generally found on rivers and canals in Europe, and may be used for river cruises or permanently moored in one place.

Hotel barges came into being following the decline in commercial and freight carrying on the canals of Europe. Many working barges have been converted into floating hotels of varying degrees of luxury. This trend began in the 1960s and has now grown into a network of hotel barges operating on the canals and rivers of France, Belgium, the Netherlands, Germany and the UK. The majority of hotel barges operate on the French waterways, where the national authority Voies Navigables de France estimates their economic importance at 60 million euros of local income, or roughly 5% of all waterway tourism business in France.

== History ==
Pleasure cruising on European canals has a long history, and purpose-built boats offering accommodation have operated on these waterways since the 19th century, most notably the fleet on the Göta Canal in Sweden. The conversion of regular barges into passenger vessels offering simple cabin facilities dates back in England to 1923, when the Pauline, a Thames barge, was fitted out to ply on the Norfolk Broads. The Inland Waterways Association Festival of Boats and Arts in Market Harborough in 1950 featured Wanderer and Wayfarer, a pair of narrow boats which had been converted to provide accommodation, and in the following years several more such boats appeared on the English canals. The English canals were narrow, though, and only limited facilities could be provided.

Almost 200 years before canal vacations became popular, Thomas Jefferson, then ambassador to France before he became the third President of the United States, had written to a friend about the Canal du Midi in southern France. He said, "Of all the methods of travelling I have ever tried this is the pleasantest.... You should not think of returning to America without taking this tour I have taken." The idea of repeating in France what was proving successful in England by converting large barges (i.e. barges generally designed to fit into the locks of canals with minimal remaining volume) began in 1966 with the Barge Palinurus, converted from a carrying coal barge called the 'Ponctuel' and captained by Richard Parsons on the canals of the Burgundy region of France. This barge was equipped to take 22 passengers, with only one bath, two showers and two toilets, and cruised on the River Yonne and the Canal de Bourgogne (Burgundy Canal).

The popularity, particularly amongst American clients, of such cruises was improved by the American writer Emily Kimborough and her book Floating Island published in 1968, about her experiences aboard the Palinurus. The high standards of accommodation expected by American clients rapidly drove the levels of luxury hotel barges upwards. In 1969, Richard Parsons teamed up with Guy Bardet, Martin Jacques and John Mathisen to launch Continental Waterways Ltd, a company that eventually ran 15 hotel barges in France. Abercrombie & Kent became wholesalers for the Company until it was sold in 2004.

Today the Palinurus is still cruising, albeit with greater comfort. She was bought by John Liley in 1985 and was renamed the Luciole. With a major redesign to accommodate 12 passengers in larger en-suite cabins. There have been continuous upgrades to the Luciole. The saloon roof was raised, the hull rebuilt and a new engine and generators installed in 2000. In 2010 the Luciole was 'stretched' in a Paris boatyard, when the barge was sliced in two and a new 17 ft section was welded into the bow, providing greater comfort throughout. However, on the front bow deck the curved cargo hatch cover was retained, a reminder of her past cargo-carrying days.

The market for luxury vacations on floating hotels has grown even further, with over 300 cabins and 70 hotel barges available on French canals alone. In recent years, the market has seen significantly increased custom from British, Australian, New Zealander and Russian clients, equalling those from the United States, according to statistics maintained by Voies Navigables de France. Today boats such as Prospérité Barge, as photographed above, tour the European canals and offer weekly charters to discerning travelers from around the globe.

== Hotel barging ==
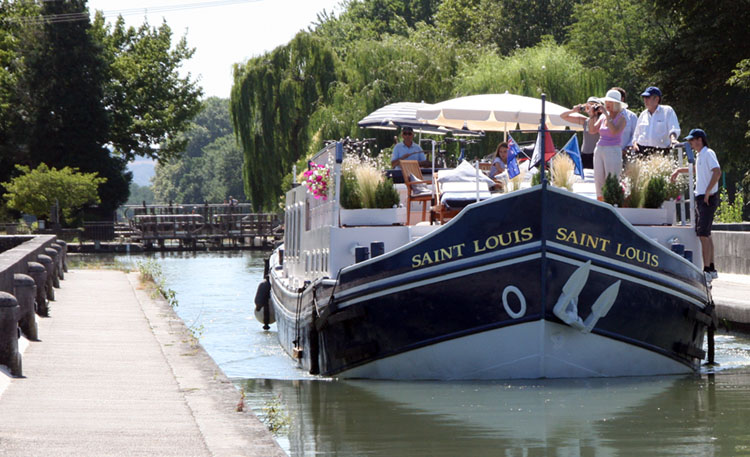
Saint Louis crossing Agen aqueduct on the Canal de Garonne

Luxury hotel barges have been cruising in Europe for over 30 years and are felt by many of their clients to provide an enjoyable, relaxing and luxurious way of experiencing countryside scenery, towns and villages. The great majority of boats are to be found in France, but there are also hotel barges operating in Ireland, England, Scotland, Germany, the Netherlands, Belgium and Italy. The French 'Classic' routes (Burgundy, the Loire Valley and the Canal du Midi) are the busiest, with the most hotel barges, as well as an appreciable number of hire boats and private pleasure craft. But hotel barges are to be found working almost all of France's waterways, including the quieter and lesser-known canals, such as the Canal du Nivernais. Most waterways (rivers and canals) remain unspoilt and key attractions of hotel barging are peace and quiet, comfort and relaxation in attractive surroundings.

Hotel barges normally travel for part of the day between town ports or more informal moorings. Most cruise on Europe's extensive canal network (8,500 km in France alone) but a few visit or operate on rivers, with varied itineraries. Many barges also provide excursions to visit local sights, for example vineyards, restaurants, artisan workshops, markets or castles, most according to a pre-arranged schedule and others according to the wishes and interests of guests. Most barges provide bicycles for guests for more informal explorations.

== Hotel barge types ==
Hotel barges vary widely in size, configuration, the scale and quality of their accommodation, and the standard and amount of catering. The largest barges take 54 guests, the smallest just four. All hotel barges have a high staff to guest ratio, but the smaller barges typically provide more personal attention and possibly comfort. A few hotel barges (six or eight guests) are 'static' and remain at their one place of mooring. A unique proposition is offered by one professional working barge, which offers comfortable modern accommodation for two - and the opportunity to see a 'real barge' in action. This activity is threatened by the application (in France) of a full professional hotel barge licence fee, making the activity unprofitable.

== Regulations and hotel barges ==
Hotel barges have to comply with a number of legal requirements, including those in France being scrutinised by the Commission de Surveillance inspectorate. The barge has to have a qualified pilot in control that has the following credentials:

- A 'GP' Grande Plaisance licence (this has replaced the former 'PP' Péniche Plaisance licence).
  This tests the pilot's thorough knowledge of waterways regulations and practicalities, together with an examination of barge handling skills. The test can only be carried out at a recognised school.
- A 'Passager' licence (Certificat de Capacité commercial licence with a “Passager” endorsement).
  This licence to carry paying guests is obtainable only after four years of practical barge operation experience.
- An 'ASP' Attestation Spéciale Passagers.
  At least one person (skipper or crew) must have this certificate, which requires knowledge of proper equipment operation, safety procedures and first aid.

The vessel itself will be certified for certain category of waterway, ranging from the straightforward to major rivers such as the Seine or Rhone to tidal coastal waters. It will be required to have appropriate insurance cover and be surveyed at regular intervals.

== Catering and facilities ==
Some hotel barges just offer bed and breakfast; others also provide lunch, full board, or more. At least one hotel barge offers self-catering. Five Star barges have a qualified and experienced chef on board who can provide cuisine of an internationally high standard, from daily fresh local ingredients - together with local wines and spirits. Many clients say that they choose a barge hotel for the catering. Some barges - particularly the smaller owner-operated ones - offer kosher, halal, vegetarian, vegan, zero starch or low carbohydrate diets.

Hotel barges provide luxurious guest rooms (cabins), with en-suite bathrooms. They will normally also include a saloon (lounge) and dining room, and an open sun deck. Some barges also feature Jacuzzi, hot tubs and small plunge pools on deck) . Many barges, especially those operating in southern France, are air-conditioned. Many hotel barges provide mobile internet access.
