= The Barge Association =

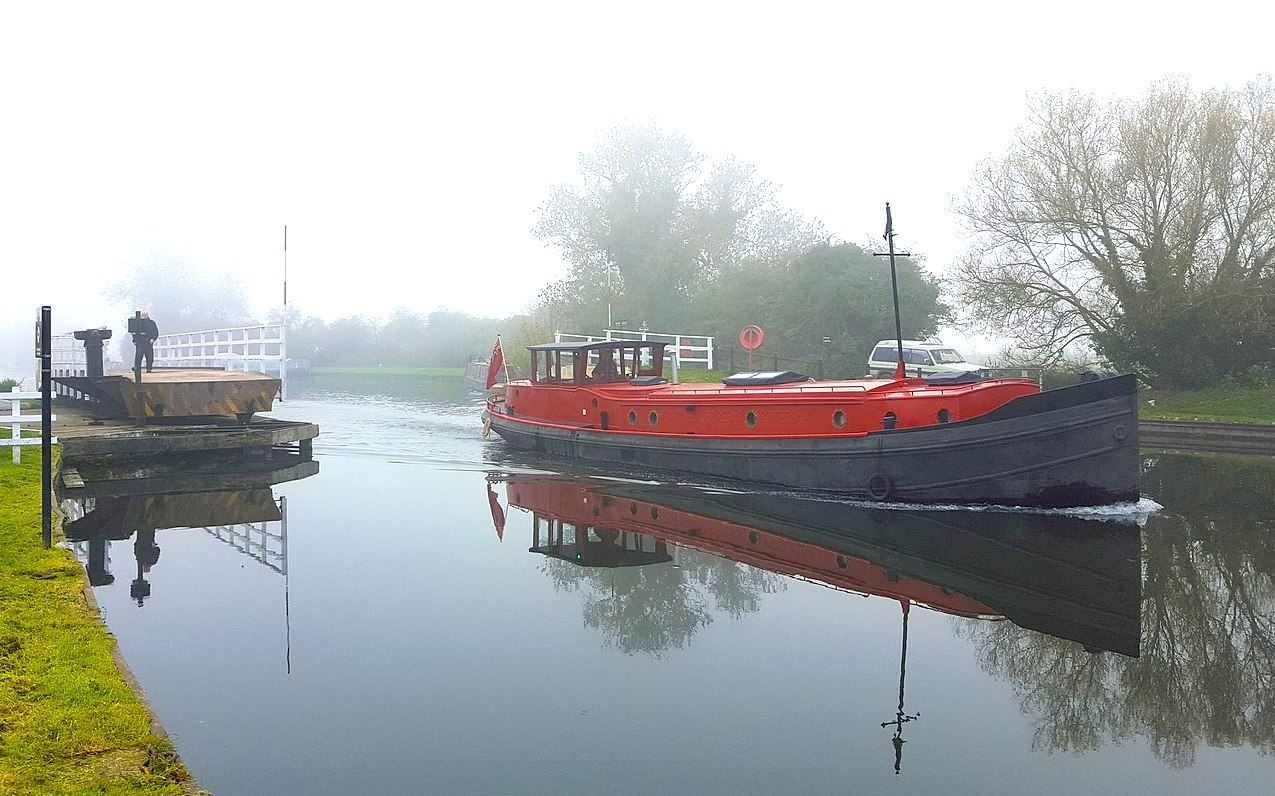
Dutch Barge passing a swing bridge, on the Gloucester & Sharpness Canal

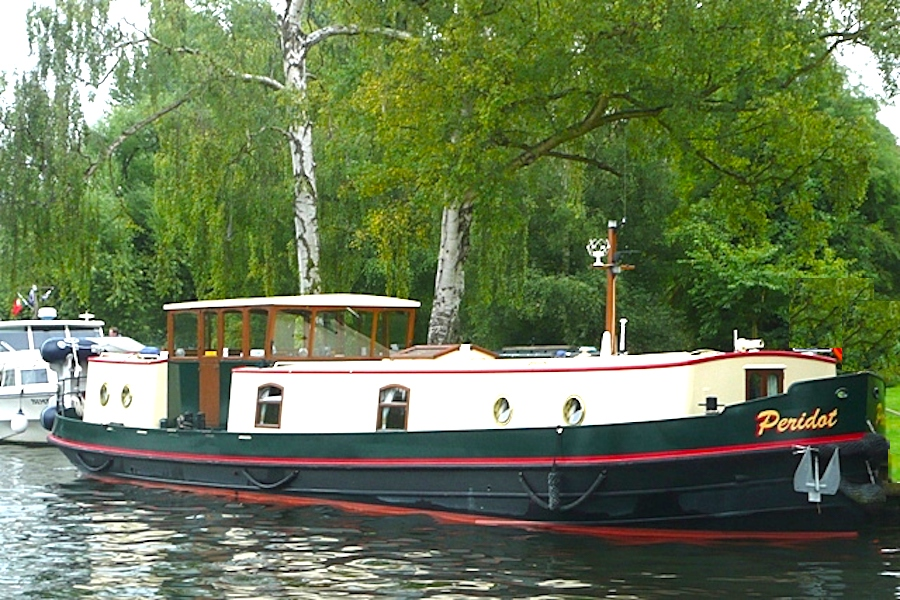
Class C Piper barge at Windsor

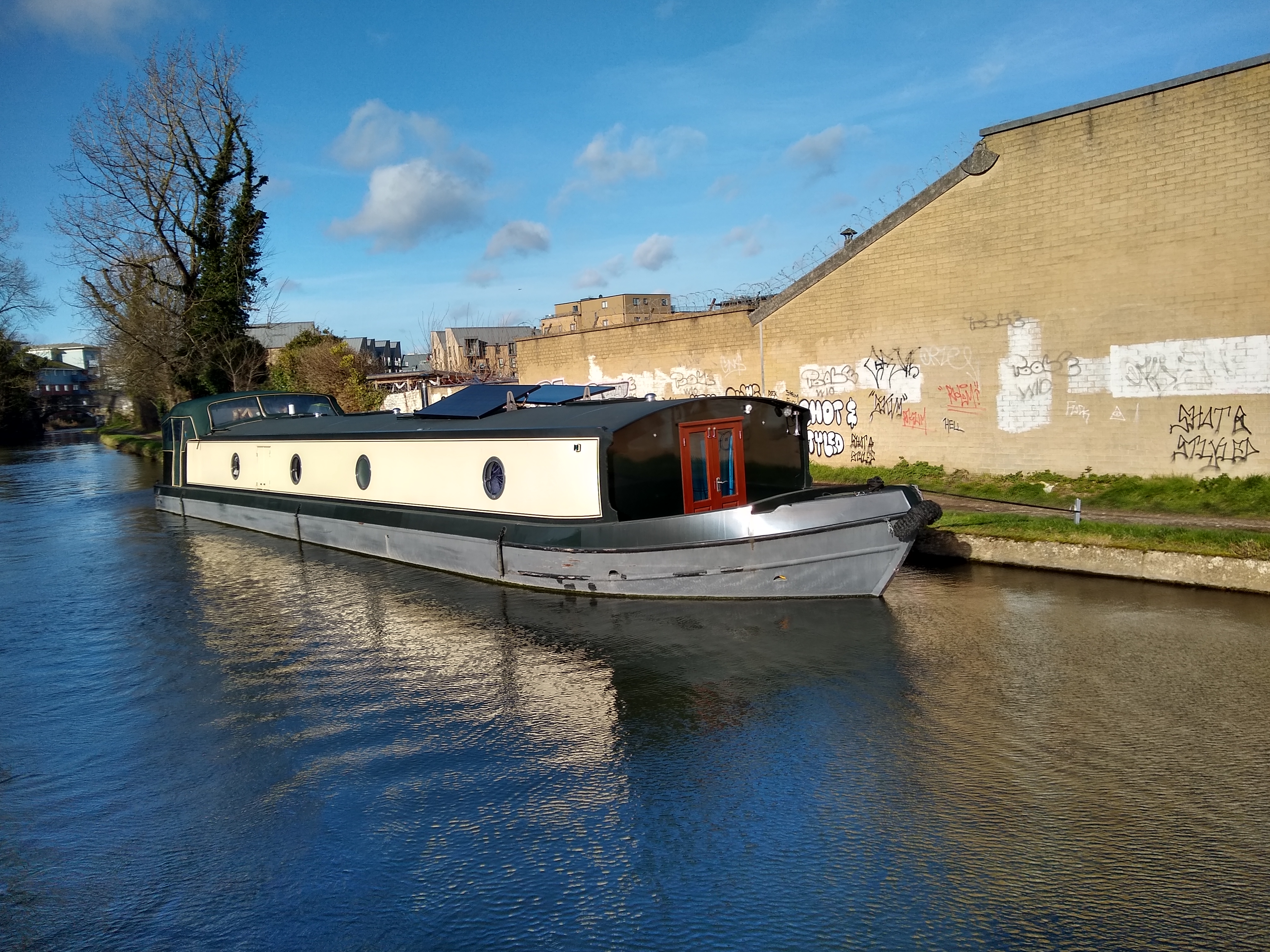
Class D widebeam on English Grand Union Canal

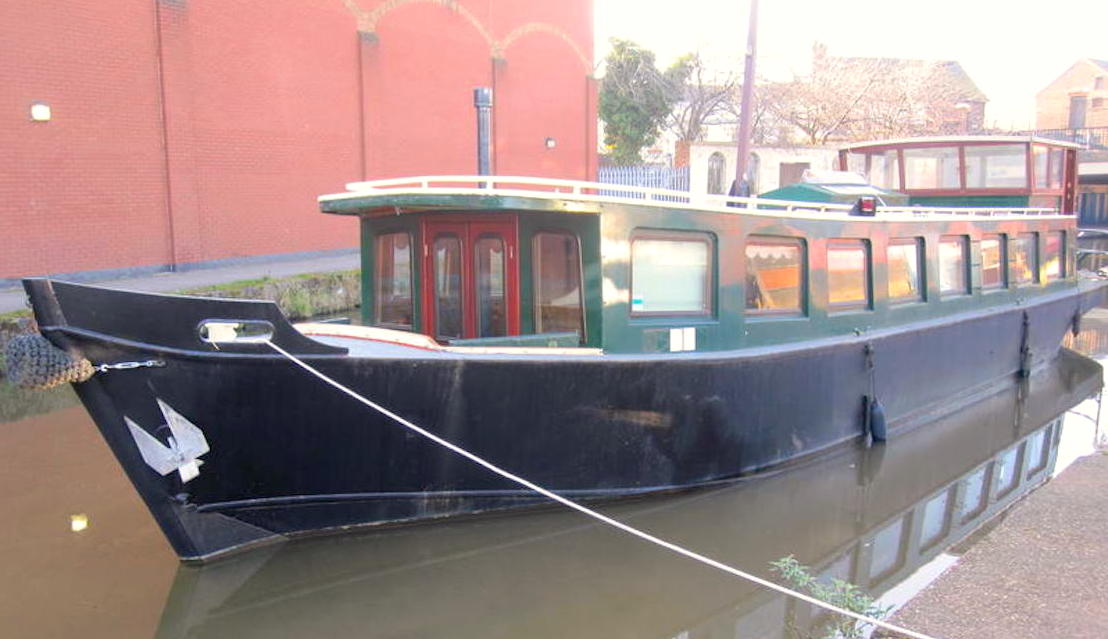
Class D English river barge at Longport, with Dutch-style fold-down wheelhouse

DBA - The Barge Association is a club for leisure users of European inland waterways. The club was formed in 1992 as "The Dutch Barge Association", by a small group of UK owners of Dutch barges. It later expanded to include any form of barge and other types of boat with the same interests in cruising in European rivers and canals, becoming "DBA - The Barge Association", DBA for short.

DBA maintains an active website with much information about barges and the European waterways, including purchase, training, regulations and technical advice. It contains a Waterways Guide with moorings and waterside facilities, frequently updated by members as they travel, and an active Forum for members to exchange information and advice. DBA publishes a bi-monthly magazine, Blue Flag, plus an online newsletter in the other months. DBA representatives attend meetings with Waterway authorities throughout Europe, and work with other organisations, to support its members' interests.

DBA's aims are to:

- Promote interest in barging
- Be the representative body for non-commercial barging
- Be the premier source of barging information
- Establish contact with and influence other relevant clubs, societies, navigation authorities and trade associations.
- Keep members informed on all barge related topics
- Facilitate communication between members to provide the opportunity for discussion of all aspects of barging.

The club's members are from all over the world. Many are retired and have time for extended cruising, sometimes all summer; but an increasing number are younger members who are able to work from their boat. Some are permanently living aboard, whether travelling or static. Members' boats range from 14m to 38m LOA, split around 50:50 above:below 20m LOA. About half are conversions of old commercial barges, with an increasing number of purpose-built pleasure craft, like. who manufacture Dutch-style motor barges.

== The EU Recreational Craft Directive ==
Leisure boats and barges up to 24m built in Europe since 1994 must comply with the EU's Recreational Craft Directive (RCD) which creates and defines four categories: A, B, C, and D.

- B - limited to offshore navigation; (winds up to Force 8 & waves up to 4 metres).
- C - limited to inshore (coastal) navigation; (winds up to Force 6 & waves up to 2 metres).
- D - limited to rivers, canals and small lakes; (winds up to Force 4 & waves up to 0.5 metres).

== The Community Inland Navigation Certificate ==
If your boat is going to be used on the European mainland waterways and qualifies as below then it may need a Community Inland Navigation Certificate ('Community Certificate') confirming that it meets the technical requirements for pleasurecraft (now ES-TRIN, was TRIWV). It does not apply in UK waters.

A community inland navigation (ES-TRIN) certificate is required for craft with a length >20 metres OR whose multiple of length x beam x draught in metres is 100 or over, where Length excludes bowsprit and rudder; Breadth excludes rubbing strake and paddle wheels; Draught excludes keel from lowest point of hull). So ES-TRIN applies to

a 14.99m ship with a beam of 4.5m and 1.5m draught a 19m ship with a beam of 4.5m and 1.2m draught

== Barge publications ==
- Blue Flag - the DBA's bi-monthly magazine for members
- The Barge Buyer's Handbook - DBA members - DBA Publications - 2022
- A Guide to Motor Barge Handling - Edward Burrell - DBA Publications - 2005
- The Dutch Barge Book - David Evershed - 1997 - ISBN 9780995730229
- The Dutch Motor Barge Book - David Evershed - 2017 - ISBN 0-95322-31-09 , 0953223116
- Sell up and Cruise the Inland Waterways - Bill & Laurel Cooper - 2010 - ISBN 9780713679885

== Barge travelogues ==
- Travels with 'Lionel' - Hart Massey - 1988 - Gollancz - ISBN 9780575041752
- The Leaky Iron Boat - Hart Massey - 1997 - Stoddart - ISBN 9780773758704
- 'Leontyne': By Barge from London to Vienna - Richard Goodwin - 1989 - Collins - ISBN 9780002153904
- Watersteps through France - Bill & Laurel Cooper - Adlard Coles Nautical - 1991 - ISBN 9780749310165
- Back Door to Byzantium - Bill & Laurel Cooper - Adlard Coles Nautical - 1997 - ISBN 9780955035104
- Watersteps round Europe - Bill & Laurel Cooper - Adlard Coles Nautical - 1996 - ISBN 9780713646375
- Narrow Dog to Carcassonne - Terry Darlington - Bantam Press - 2005 - ISBN 9780553816693
- Narrow Dog to Indian River - Terry Darlington - Bantam Press - 2008- ISBN 978-0593062616
- Narrow Dog to Wigan Pier - Terry Darlington - Bantam Press - 2012 -ISBN 9780857500632
- The Voyages of 'The Princess Matilda' - Shane Spall - Ebury Press - 2012 - ISBN 9780091941802
- Just Passing Through - Mary-Jane Houlton - eBook edition - 2020 - ISBN 9798635556627
- Barging into Southern France - Gerard Morgan-Grenville- David & Charles - 1973 - ISBN 0715357336
- Barging into France - Gerard Morgan-Grenville - David & Charles - 1975 - ISBN 0715354566
- Barging into Burgundy - Gerard Morgan-Grenville - David & Charles - 1975 - ISBN 0715368346

== See also ==
- Cruising Association - a club primarily serving marine sailors and cruisers, but which also encompasses barging on inland waterways.
- Inland Waterways Association - a club primarily serving narrowboat and widebeam users on the British canal system.
- List of waterway societies in the United Kingdom
