= Cruising Association =

British organisation for cruising sailors

The Cruising Association
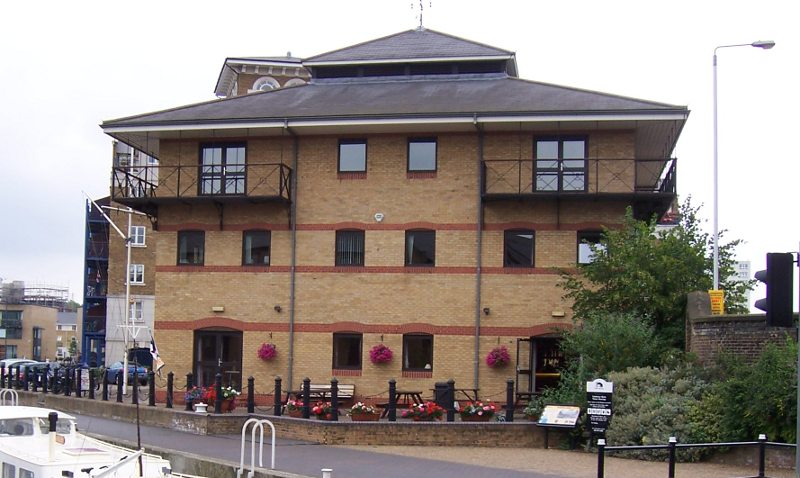
- CA House in Limehouse Basin
- Abbreviation: CA
- Formation: 14 December 1908; 117 years ago
- Founder: Claud Worth
- Headquarters: London, United Kingdom
- Website: www.theca.org.uk

The Cruising Association (CA) which was founded in 1908 is the largest British-based organisation which caters exclusively for cruising sailors. Membership is composed of sailors based in the UK and around the world who cruise inland, inshore and offshore by sail or power.

With more than 6400 members across the globe, and growing, The Cruising Association provides services, information, help and advice to cruising sailors worldwide. Founded in December 1908, The Cruising Association publishes the Cruising Almanac which covers from Shetland in the north around the coasts and islands of Great Britain and Ireland; on the continent, from Bergen into the approaches to the Baltic and right down to Gibraltar, and has local representatives all over the world. The Cruising Association has 18 UK and worldwide Sections providing specialised knowledge and events wherever members cruise.

The Cruising Association is a limited company run by a volunteer Council and a number of committees and groups, and has a Secretariat that runs the business of the Association from its headquarters, CA House, in London's Limehouse Basin. The Association's Patron is Sir Robin Knox-Johnston.

== Publications ==
Throughout its history, The Cruising Association has produced sailing directories for members. These were, at one time, the only source of cruising information available to supplement charts and were produced annually, incorporated in a Handbook for members. Subsequently, the Handbook was produced in an enlarged version which covered the whole Atlantic seaboard of Europe. From 2003, this information was published on behalf of the Association by the publishers Imray, Laurie, Norrie & Wilson, as the Cruising Association Almanac which is now produced annually.

In addition, The Cruising Association publishes a full colour quarterly magazine Cruising, which includes technical articles, news, and accounts of members' cruises, along with a monthly newsletter.

The Patron of The Cruising Association, the record-breaking round-the-world yachtsman Sir Robin Knox-Johnston, describes it as "the leading single source of cruising information for cruising yachtsman".

== History ==
At the end of the nineteenth century, yachting was mainly an occupation of the upper classes, with pioneers such as Edward Frederick Knight, Claud Worth, Frank Cowper, Richard Turrill McMullen, Erskine Childers etc. As early as 1880 a small group who were interested in cruising, rather than racing, decided there was a need for a new club to cater for the interests of the cruising yachtsman. The leader of this group, many of whom lived far from the sea in or around Wolverhampton was a 29-year-old Barrister, Arthur Underhill, who had just had his first fully decked yacht built – a two and a half ton sloop. This was the start of the Cruising Club and after eight years Underhill became Commodore, an office he was to hold until 1937, two years before his death. In 1901 the Club was well enough established to be granted the Royal prefix. The intention of the founders of the RCC, however, was that it should remain small, friendly and intimate. To ensure this, a limit was set on the numbers and in 1904 this was to be 260, later expanded to 400.

However, for the growing number of ordinary cruising yachtsmen there was no generally available organisation catering for their interests. On the other hand, there were boatmen around the coast who were quick to realise that a good profit could be made out of this developing pastime, and cruising yachtsmen were becoming frustrated. A letter from A. D. Hownam-Meek to the Editor of Yachting Weekly suggested that "Surely it would be possible to form some Union as obtains in the cycle and motor world to compile a register of honest boatmen at the various ports who would, I feel sure, consent to work or supply moorings at a standard fee, in return for the advertisement which they would thus receive, and a most important benefit would be obtained, at a very small cost". This letter stimulated a lively correspondence in the yachting press.

In November 1907, the Editor of Yachting Weekly offered a room to those interested in discussing the formation of an Association. Some 30 yachtsmen turned up at No. 5 Arundel Street in the Strand and agreed that: "It is desirable to have an Association, not formed upon the lines of an ordinary club, to give increased facilities to cruising yachtsmen."

A provisional committee was formed which, in five further meetings, produced a draft constitution for submission to the first Annual General Meeting on 14 December 1908 at the Bay Tree, St Swithin's Lane.

Many of those at the meeting must have known each other well and some had sailed together. Although Claude Worth does not appear on the list of those attending, there were at least three, H. J. Hanson, C. Devereux Marshall and E .S. M. Perowne who had sailed with him regularly. At the back of the room was a quiet man, John Love, in his early fifties, who left others to do the talking. If anyone had probed his background they would have discovered a man who had led a varied and wandering life from the linen trade in Dundee, to storekeeping, lumbering and private banking at Grenfell and Saskatchewan in Canada. His last employment had been in the grain trade in Winnipeg. In 1907 he came home and bought 'Rover', a four and a half ton yacht, which he sailed in Scotland. It was not exactly an impressive sailing background but, to his great surprise, he found himself in the Chair. He said later. "That no other reason occurred to him for his election to the Chair in the first instance than his seniority among those present."

In any case, the expertise was provided by the rest of the committee, which included an energetic vice-chairman, W. J. Almond, a solicitor, Perowne, who was Hon. Secretary, a City financier, W Slade Olver, two of the great names of sailing, E. F. Knight and Claude Worth. Herbert J. Hanson (1875–1958), who became Treasurer and was virtually to run the Association for forty years, and a number of keen experienced sailors, G. Burnett, F. Dugon, D. M. Haig, C. J. Harrison, W.T.R.R. Beckett, A. H. Solomon and E. S. Turner. Cowper and Reynolds were among the early members.

The Association had got off to a very good start but, just as everything was going so well, the First World War broke out and the Association went into a state of suspension. The last entry in the Bulletin for August 1914 contained instructions for yachtsmen who might come across a few torpedoes, and ended with the words "A reward of at least £5 is offered for a lost torpedo after it has been missing for a day."

Once the Armistice was signed in 1918, many yachtsmen wasted little time in getting afloat again and as early as April 1919 Frank Cowper, who was then the Cruising Association's Local Representative at Fowey reported that many small boats were fitting out, some already being in the water. They would have found that, superficially, there had been little change during the previous five years. A few familiar landmarks had disappeared: at the mouth of some rivers with shifting bars any buoyage that still existed might bear little relation to the channel, but the same boats were back afloat and, as before the war, it was regarded as bad form to display the boat's name anywhere except on the jerseys and caps of the crew.

The CA had opened its door again too, with Herbert J. Hanson as Secretary. He had had a distinguished wartime career with service afloat, first in his own motor-cruiser and later as a Gunnery Instructor and in mine clearance and had been awarded the O.B.E. He then retired from business and devoted himself full-time to cruising and to the Association. So quick was he to take charge that the first post war Bulletin, edited by him, was produced as early as April 1919.

However, despite the superficial impression of an unchanged world, four years of war could hardly fail to make some impact on cruising. Women, for example, had gained freedom and there was a noticeable increase, as the Local Representative in Burnham put it, in the "number of really useful lady sailors joining the ranks of yachting women." Some of them indeed were even following the new fashion of living aboard the whole year. At the same time there was a noticeable decrease in the availability of paid hands – at least at the rate which the average yachtsman, faced with rising costs of materials and rail fares (the easiest way of getting to the boat for those living inland) could afford, as rates of pay had increased about 70%. With the heavy gaff rig in use at the time, this could be a serious handicap, and though the CA could help a little through its crewing service it was limited by the fact that, as most members were owners, the number wanting crews far exceeded the supply of those looking for boats.

The outbreak of WW2 in 1939 again caused the suspension of cruising and the rooms where members had met to exchange news and gossip fell silent. The CA went on to a Care and Maintenance basis, with a Committee taking over from Council and meeting once a year to approve the accounts and elect Officers. The collection of rare maritime books was sent away for safety, though the doors of the Library at the then headquarters at Chiltern Court in Baker Street, London, were never closed. Even after the war, sea sailing was hardly encouraged until the mines, which surrounded the UK coast, had been swept away. Harbour facilities could not be provided for yachtsmen until bomb damage had been repaired. There was some river sailing for those whose boats were fit for use but, with shortages of paint, white lead, varnish, tar, labour, and other materials, fitting out was difficult. Some, whose boats had been left unattended in mud berths were to find that the war had been really enjoyed – by the worms who had grown fat on untreated timber.

The restrictions on cruising in these immediate post-war years are obvious from the sort of questions referred to Council, in the hope that official rather than individual representations would prove to be valuable. Typical examples ranged from the difficulty of obtaining milk at Falmouth (rationing of course was still being imposed) to worries about oil discharge at Milford Haven, the threat to Southwold harbour from proposals to build a dam for land drainage and the height of electricity cables on the river Axe. Perhaps the most useful action from the CA was to persuade British Rail to revive the Yachtsman's Rail Ticket.

== The Library and Information Centre ==
As early as September 1924 Hanson could write: "Already we have a collection of great interest, containing a number of beautiful books, among which every reader and many a student can satisfy his taste. Some of the books in the Wanted list are difficult to find and assistance members can offer will be appreciated."

There had been general agreement from the very earliest days of the association about the principle of forming a Library, but whether many members had any idea of the sort of Library that Hanson had in mind is open to doubt. Hanson himself loved browsing in bookshops, but in building up the Library it was important that he had expert help from one of the two booksellers in London who specialised in books about Travel and the Sea. Both shops were founded during the 1850s and Maggs Bros. worked with Sir James Caird, helping him to build the library of the National Maritime Museum. All the books, which both collectors needed, were available on the market and prices were reasonable. So it came about that the CA Library was not just a collection of useful, instructional and informative books but one of two great collections of books to do with the Sea.

In 1990 some rare and fragile parts of the collection were sold to Cambridge University Library where they form the Hanson Collection and the headquarters at Limehouse Basin was built with the proceeds. These works are now more acessable. Any member of the Association can obtain a reader's ticket at the Cambridge University Library by application to the Association's headquarters.

== See also ==
- DBA - The Barge Association - a club for leisure users of barges on European inland waterways.
