= Royal Cruising Club =

Yacht club founded in London

- Burgee

- Blue Ensign
- Short name: RCC
- Founded: 1880
- Location: United Kingdom
- Commodore: Nick Chavasse MBE
- Website: https://www.rcc.org.uk/

The Royal Cruising Club (RCC) is a British yacht club founded in London in 1880 to support leisure sailing. It is most widely known for the series of pilotage books produces under the auspices of the Royal Cruising Club Pilotage Foundation, a registered charity. Membership of the RCC is restricted to no more than 400 and is by invitation only although some of its awards are open to all yachtspeople.

Notable members have included include Erskine Childers, Arthur Ransome, Hammond Innes, Peter and Anne Pye, Bill Tilman, Blondie Hasler, Adlard Coles, Miles and Beryl Smeeton and Eric and Susan Hiscock (Eric Hiscock was Vice-Commodore from 1959 to 1963), Paul Heiney

== Awards ==
The RCC presents annual cups, medals and prizes some specifically for its members but also unrestricted awards for feats of outstanding exploration, seamanship and services to cruising. The first award in 1896 was the members Challenge Cup, which was held by the winner for a year and was awarded to the member who during the past season had carried out the most novel, enterprising, skilful, and instructive cruise. Holders of this cup included Dr. Howard Sinclair, 1896-1898; Lieutenant-Colonel R. Barrington Baker, 1899, 1900, 1902; Philip Herbert, 1901; Colonel T. V. W. Phillips, R.A., 1903; C. E. Walker, 1904. The unrestricted awards include:

- The Royal Cruising Club Medal for Seamanship awarded most years with recipients including Robin Knox-Johnston in 1969, Alec Rose in 1968, and Francis Chichester in 1967. More recently Jeanne Socrates was awarded the medal in 2013.
- The Tilman Medal, medal is awarded in memory of Bill Tilman, an RCC member who combined cruising in high latitudes with mountaineering. It is awarded for an 'outstanding voyage in Arctic or Antarctic waters or in other remote places in high latitudes'. The 2015 recipient was Skip Novak.
- The Medal for Services to Cruising

The Hiscocks won numerous awards from the RCC. They jointly received the Sir Lennon Goldsmith Exploration Award in 1973, and the Medal for Services to Cruising in 1975. Susan Hiscock twice won the Ladies' Cup.

== Publications ==
An early commitment to navigation by the club's founders has been maintained. In the early part of the 20th century, portfolios of engraved colour charts were published. The club pioneered many things now taken for granted such as small charts of harbour approaches and sailing directions for small craft.

Since 1976 the Royal Cruising Club Pilotage Foundation has been endeavouring “to advance the education of the public in the science and practice of navigation”. The Pilotage Foundation publishes a wide range of pilotage information especially pilotage books for regions around the world, amounting to some 60 works, providing sailing information in many areas worldwide, in English and other languages.

The Royal Cruising Club Pilotage Foundation was incorporated as an independent company limited by guarantee in 2005 (RCC Pilotage Foundation Ltd) and is a registered charity in the UK. Its operations are run by a volunteer management team responsible to the Pilotage Foundation's trustees, whose appointment is approved by the RCC.

== History ==
Cruising as a separate activity was not the main focus of yacht clubs in Victorian Britain but in 1880, Arthur Underhill, a Barrister from Wolverhampton, gathered together a small group of cruising enthusiasts to form what was then simply the Cruising Club. The sole objective was to further recreational boating summarized in the original club rules as

   "to associate the owners of small yachts, boats and canoes used for cruising on sea, river or lake, and any other persons interested in aquatic amusements."[9][2]

The club began to earn a reputation as being helpful and competent by circulating accounts of their cruising activities and an archive of these is now publicly available on the club's website. The club began to publish pilotage guides and other useful cruising information.

The cruising activity of the club's members expanded rapidly. The first transatlantic crossing, in 1892, was followed by more intrepid explorations culminating in the first complete circumnavigation in 1919. In 1902 a Royal Charter was granted and the club became The Royal Cruising Club. Many notable yachtspeople have been RCC members including Claud Worth, Miles and Beryl Smeeton and especially Eric and Susan Hiscock, whose lifetime of voyaging, and their accounts of these in books and films, inspired a generation of long distance sailors in modest yachts.

Unlike many yacht clubs the RCC does not operate from a fixed base, with a gathering 1894, the RCC was an early adopter of what are widely called 'Meets' (a term borrowed from hunting). In these the boats gather together at an agreed anchorage often rafting up. Most years a meet takes place in the lower reaches of the River Beaulieu in Hampshire, but they are spread worldwide. The practice was adopted by many other clubs including the sections of the Cruising Association and the Cruising Club of America and many other similar organizations worldwide.

During World War II a select group of superannuated yachtsmen, including several members of the Royal Cruising Club, were recruited to survey and study parts of the continental coastline that might be of strategic significance .

== See also ==
The Cruising Association is a larger UK organization representing the interests of small boat cruising and also active in providing pilotage information for small boat cruisers.
