= Timothy Spall =

English actor (born 1957)

Timothy Spall OBE
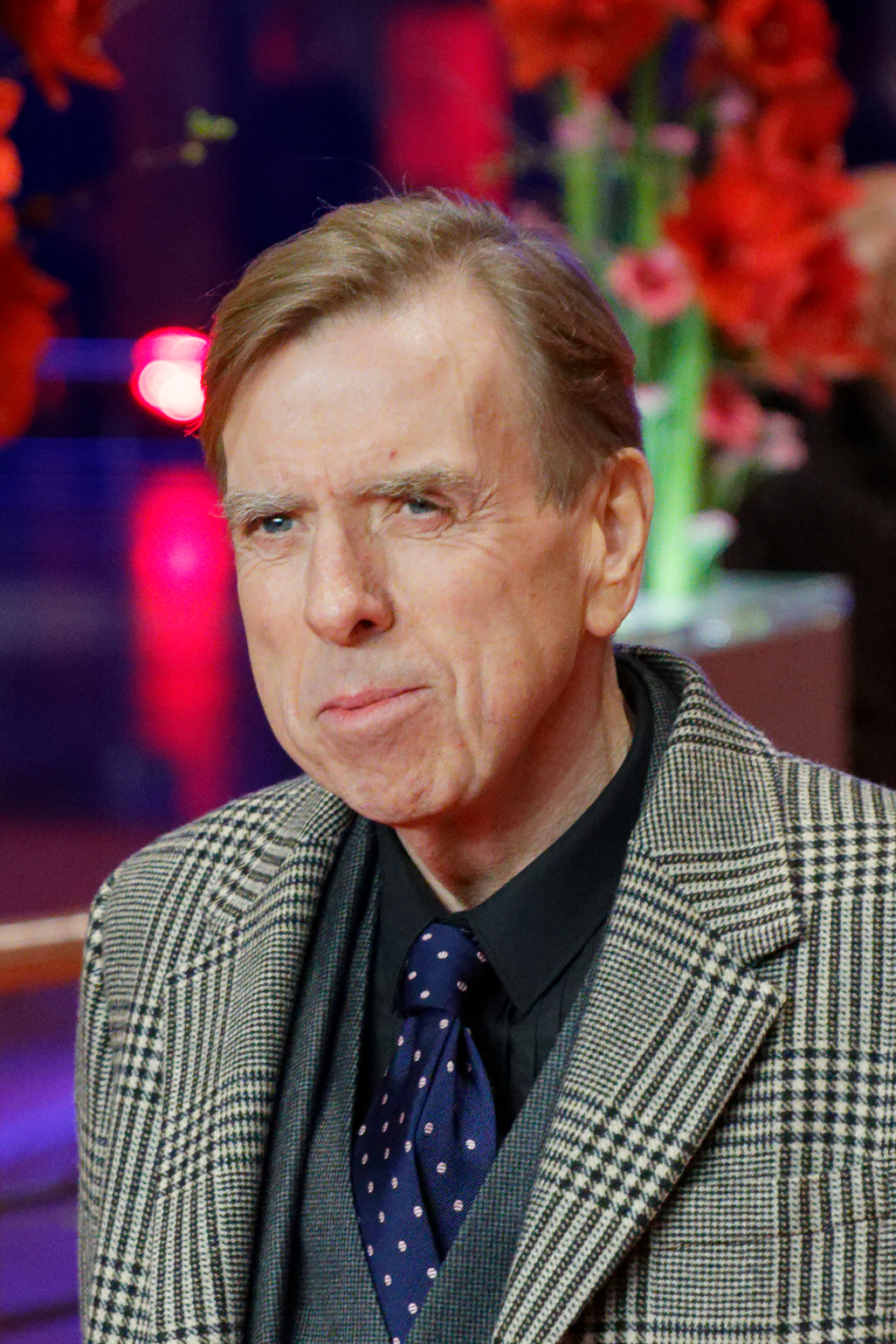
- Spall at the world premiere of The Party in Berlin, 2017
- Born: Timothy Leonard Spall; 27 February 1957 (age 69); London, England
- Education: Royal Academy of Dramatic Art (BA)
- Occupation: Actor
- Years active: 1978–present
- Spouse: Shane Spall (m. 1981)
- Children: 3, including Rafe Spall

Timothy Leonard Spall (/ˈspɔːl/ SPAWL; born 27 February 1957) is an English actor. He gained recognition for his character actor roles on stage and screen. In 2000, he was appointed Officer of the Order of the British Empire (OBE) by Queen Elizabeth II.

Spall is known for his collaborations with director Mike Leigh, acting in six of his films: Home Sweet Home (1982), Life is Sweet (1990), Secrets & Lies (1996), Topsy-Turvy (1999), All or Nothing (2002), and Mr. Turner (2014). He was nominated for a BAFTA Award for his roles in Secrets and Lies and Topsy-Turvy, and in 2014 he received the Cannes Film Festival Best Actor Award for his portrayal of J. M. W. Turner in Mr. Turner.

Spall has acted in films such as Hamlet (1996), Still Crazy (1998), Nicholas Nickleby (2002), The Last Samurai (2003), Enchanted (2007), Sweeney Todd: The Demon Barber of Fleet Street (2007), The Damned United (2009), The King's Speech (2010), Ginger and Rosa (2012), Denial (2016), The Party (2017), and Spencer (2021). He voiced Nick the rat in Chicken Run (2000), and portrayed Peter Pettigrew (Wormtail) in five Harry Potter films, from Prisoner of Azkaban (2004) to Deathly Hallows – Part 1 (2010). In 2025, he appeared in Goodbye June directed by Kate Winslet.

On television, Spall played Barry Spencer Taylor in the ITV comedy drama series Auf Wiedersehen, Pet (1983–2004) and Lord Arthur Wallington in the BBC Cold War drama Summer of Rockets (2019). He won the 2024 International Emmy Awards and BAFTA TV Award for Best Actor in a Leading Role, for his performance as Peter Farquhar in The Sixth Commandment. He currently plays the leading role in the BBC murder mystery series Death Valley.

From 2010 to 2012, the BBC broadcast three documentary series Timothy Spall: ...at Sea, about Spall's voyage around Britain in his barge.

== Early life ==
Spall, the third of four sons, was born on 27 February 1957 in Battersea, London. His mother, Sylvia R. (née Leonard), was a hairdresser, and his father, Joseph L. Spall, was a postal worker. Spall attended Battersea County Comprehensive School. At that time, he was planning on going to art school or joining the army. Spall's ambitions turned towards acting when he was 16, after appearing in a school play as the lion in the Wizard of Oz: "I was up there on stage being funny, and people laughed. I wanted to do it again and again." He trained at the National Youth Theatre, and at RADA, graduating in 1978, after being awarded the Bancroft Gold Medal as the most promising actor in his year.

== Career ==
Spall initially made his mark in theatre performing in productions for Birmingham Rep, including the UK premier of Arnold Wesker's The Merchant, and, later, the Royal Shakespeare Company, including The Merry Wives of Windsor, Three Sisters, Nicholas Nickleby, and The Knight of the Burning Pestle. At the National Theatre, Spall played the Dauphin in George Bernard Shaw's St Joan.

Following a film debut in Quadrophenia and wider TV exposure playing, as Wayne says, "the gormless radish" [awkward] Barry Taylor in all four series of Auf Wiedersehen, Pet, Kevin in Outside Edge and Aubrey the appalling chef in Mike Leigh's Life is Sweet, Spall has since appeared in the films Crusoe, Secrets & Lies, Shooting the Past, Topsy-Turvy, Vanilla Sky, Rock Star, All or Nothing, The Last Samurai, Lemony Snicket's A Series of Unfortunate Events and The King's Speech. He performed as Peter Pettigrew ("Wormtail") in the Harry Potter film series. In 1991, he guest starred in the series 5 Red Dwarf episode "Back to Reality". In 1993, Spall was a guest on the Scottish comedy series Rab C. Nesbitt. He played Inspector Truscott in a 1997 Radio 3 broadcast of Loot by Orton, repeated in 2017.

He was appointed Officer of the Order of the British Empire (OBE) in the 2000 New Year Honours.

Spall performed lead vocals on the song "The Devil is an Englishman" from the Ken Russell film Gothic (1986), in which Spall portrayed John William Polidori. Spall played the starring role of Albert Pierrepoint in the 2005 film Pierrepoint, which was released as The Last Hangman in the United States. In the 2006 video game Grand Theft Auto: Vice City Stories, Spall voiced Phil Collins' manager, Barry Mickelthwaite. In 2007, he starred as Nathaniel in Disney's Enchanted and Beadle Bamford in Tim Burton's production of Sweeney Todd: The Demon Barber of Fleet Street. He also starred as Georgie Godwin in a one-off television drama The Fattest Man in Britain, on ITV1, which aired on 20 December 2009. The drama also featured Bobby Ball, Frances Barber, Aisling Loftus, and Jeremy Kyle.

In 2010, he portrayed Winston Churchill in the film The King's Speech, for which, as a member of the ensemble, he was jointly awarded the Screen Actors Guild Award for Outstanding Performance by a Cast in a Motion Picture. Spall reprised the role at the 2012 Summer Olympics closing ceremony.

In 2012, Spall filmed Wasteland (known as The Rise in Britain), with actors Matthew Lewis and Vanessa Kirby. The Newport Beach Film Festival in Newport Beach, California, screened Wasteland in April 2013. Also in 2012, Spall played Charlie Morgan in the film Comes a Bright Day.

In 2013 and 2014, Spall starred in the BBC television series Blandings, a comedy series adapted by Guy Andrews from the Blandings Castle stories of P. G. Wodehouse. It was first broadcast on 13 January 2013.

In 2014, he won the Best Actor Award at the 2014 Cannes Film Festival for Mr. Turner, a biographical film on J. M. W. Turner directed by Mike Leigh. Spall has mentioned that this role is his personal favourite as it inspired him to take on painting. In 2016, Spall portrayed Holocaust denier David Irving in the film Denial, directed by Mick Jackson.

From 29 March to 14 May 2016, Spall played the title role of Davies in Harold Pinter's play The Caretaker, directed by Matthew Warchus at the Old Vic theatre in London opposite George MacKay and Daniel Mays.

In 2018, he played Terry Perkins, one of the robbers, in the ITV miniseries Hatton Garden. He went on to play Major Alistair Gregory in the acclaimed dramatic film Spencer (2021), opposite Kristen Stewart as Diana, Princess of Wales.

Spall received the 2024 BAFTA TV Award for Best Actor in a Leading Role, for his performance as Peter Farquhar in the BBC's true-life drama series The Sixth Commandment, first broadcast in 2023. Also in 2024, Spall played the Duke of Norfolk in the BBC dramatisation of the Hilary Mantel novel Wolf Hall: The Mirror and the Light, taking on the role played in the first series by the late Bernard Hill.

To mark the 80th anniversary of the end of World War 2 in Europe, in May 2025, Spall performed a public reading in London of the speech Winston Churchill had delivered when Germany surrendered.

In 2025 Spall played Polonius in a modern-day adaptation of Hamlet, scripted by Michael Lesslie and directed by Aneil Karia, before going on to create the role of John Chapel in Death Valley.

== Personal life ==
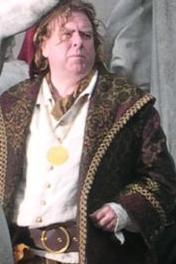
Spall filming Enchanted in New York City in 2006

Spall and his wife Shane have three children including Rafe, who is also an actor. He lives in Forest Hill, south-east London.

Having been a portly man for much of his career, Spall resolved to slim down for his role in 2015's The Enfield Haunting and, through his efforts, shed a notable amount of weight.

In 1996, Spall was diagnosed with acute myeloid leukaemia, but has since been in remission. He has said of his illness:

I didn't know what made me ill but stress had something to do with it and the point is now to head off stress at the pass. It made me aware of things and become more selective. I am less worried about employment. I really do my homework so I am not getting stressed on the set because I don't know what I'm doing.

He is the owner of a Dutch barge, in which he and his wife sailed around the British Isles; their voyage was the subject of the BBC Four TV series Timothy Spall: ...at Sea.

== Awards and nominations ==
Year	Award	Category	Nominated work	Result
1996	British Academy Film Awards	Best Actor in a Leading Role	Secrets & Lies	Nominated
2000	British Academy Film Awards	Best Actor in a Supporting Role	Topsy-Turvy	Nominated
1999	British Academy Television Awards	Best Actor	Our Mutual Friend	Nominated
2000	British Academy Television Awards	Best Actor	Shooting the Past	Nominated
2002	British Academy Television Awards	Best Actor	Vacuuming Completely Nude in Paradise	Nominated
2024	British Academy Television Awards	Best Actor	The Sixth Commandment	Won
2001	British Independent Film Awards	Best Actor	Lucky Break	Nominated
2002	British Independent Film Awards	Best Actor	All or Nothing	Nominated
2014	British Independent Film Awards	Best Actor	Mr. Turner	Nominated
2014	Cannes Film Festival	Best Actor	Mr. Turner	Won
2014	Capri Hollywood International Film Festival	Best Actor	Mr. Turner	Won
2008	Critics' Choice Awards	Best Acting Ensemble	Sweeney Todd: The Demon Barber of Fleet Street	Nominated
2002	European Film Awards	Best Actor	All or Nothing	Nominated
2014	European Film Awards	Best Actor	Mr. Turner	Won
2024	International Emmy Awards	Best Actor	The Sixth Commandment	Won
1984	Laurence Olivier Awards	Best Actor in a Supporting Role	Saint Joan	Nominated
1997	London Film Critics' Circle Awards	British Actor of the Year	Secrets & Lies	Nominated
2001	London Film Critics' Circle Awards	Supporting Actor of the Year	Topsy-Turvy	Nominated
2007	London Film Critics' Circle Awards	British Actor of the Year	Pierrepoint: The Last Hangman	Nominated
2010	London Film Critics' Circle Awards	Supporting Actor of the Year	The Damned United	Nominated
2015	London Film Critics' Circle Awards	Actor of the Year	Mr. Turner	Nominated
2015	London Film Critics' Circle Awards	British Actor of the Year	Mr. Turner	Won
2002	National Board of Review Awards	Best Cast	Nicholas Nickleby	Won
2014	National Society of Film Critics Awards	Best Actor	Mr. Turner	Won
2014	New York Film Critics Circle Awards	Best Actor	Mr. Turner	Won
2009	Satellite Awards	Best Supporting Actor – Motion Picture	The Damned United	Nominated
2010	Screen Actors Guild Award	Outstanding Performance by a Cast in a Motion Picture	The King's Speech	Won
2016	UK Film Festival	Edgeware Outstanding Achievement Award	Stanley a Man of Variety	Won
