= Wing engine =

A wing engine is a subsidiary engine installed in a motor boat alongside the main engine. The primary purpose of a wing engine is to provide redundancy and safety in the event of failure of the main engine; a secondary benefit assists manoeuvering in port or in a marina.

== Wing engine installation ==
Whereas the main engine will be larger and invariably mounted on the vessel's centreline, the wing engine will be considerably smaller and positioned to one side. A wing engine will typically be either:

- a small marine engine that may also serve as a generator when running; or
- a diesel generator that may power (typically via a 12v or 24v battery pack) an electric motor that drives its own propeller shaft and propeller.

In either case, the wing engine's propeller will be off-centre. This can give rise to steering difficulties; but this can be used to advantage in port with the main engine as follows: if the main engine has a right-hand propeller, the "prop walk" when in reverse will tend to move the stern to port. In these circumstances, the wing-motor should be arranged to have a propeller to the left (port-side) of the centreline, so as to balance the vessel in astern, or to produce (with the main engine in neutral) a vector thrust to starboard.

Canal boats need very little power in canals, as there is virtually no current (and there are often speed limits). In such canals the wing engine may be used to propel the boat; but when the vessel puts to sea or navigates a fast flowing river, the power of the main engine would be needed. Diesel engines suffer harm if not run under load, so a small wing engine under load should be more efficient in a canal than a main engine operating barely above tick-over.

=== Examples of wing engine installations ===
- a 10m Vlet used on canals by author Marian Martin had a 120bhp DAF main engine, and an 18bhp Sabb wing engine. Ms Martin was so impressed that in her book she recommends wing engines, albeit with some reservations.
- a 27m schooner-rigged Dutch sailing barge, Hosanna, had a large Cummins main engine and a smaller Perkins wing engine. When the Cummins failed, the owners, Bill & Laurel Cooper motored through the French canals to re-engine the boat at Great Yarmouth. So exasperated were they by the tricky steering using just a wing engine for long stretches, that instead of replacing the Cummins with a similar large main engine, they installed two more Perkins engines and propellers. Hosanna now had three similar Perkins engines, one in the centre, and one on either side. In calm canals, just the central engine alone would be used; the other two would be engaged at sea or in fast rivers, or when manoeuvering.
