= Bill & Laurel Cooper =

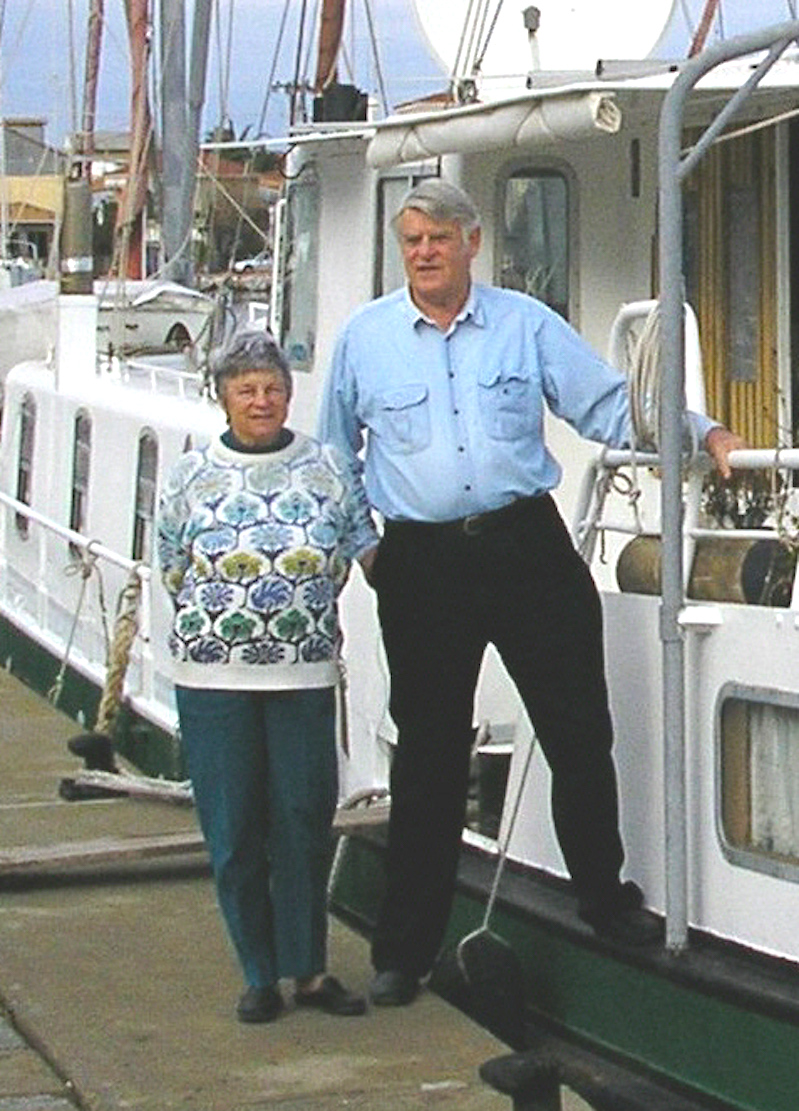
Bill & Laurel Cooper with their barge "Hosanna" in Levkas, Greece, 2004.

Until Bill's death, Bill & Laurel Cooper were a married couple who were successful co-authors of several nautical books and travelogues. For a record number of decades, they lived afloat on a succession of boats, including a ketch sailing boat, a Dutch barge, and a motor boat of their own design.

== The Coopers ==
Bill Cooper

Bill Cooper (Reginald William Binch Cooper) (5 November 1928 – 7 March 2016) was a Royal Navy lieutenant-commander and later actuary who gave up his profession to become a full-time recreational sailor and author. He was awarded the Hammond Cup for seamanship by the Royal Naval Sailing Association and was recognised by the World Record Academy for having spent the longest time at sea. As well as writing several non-fiction books with his wife Laurel, as a solo author he wrote a novel that was published in 2014. Bill held a healthy disrespect for bureaucracy, especially within the European Union (EU), the Voies navigables de France (VNF), the Maritime and Coastguard Agency (MCA) and with regard to the Recreational Craft Directive (RCD).

Laurel Cooper

Laurel Cooper (born 1929) is an author, an artist, an illustrator, an accomplished cook, and a former branch director of the Samaritans. Born with a dislocated hip, in her youth she endured 2½ years in hospital and leg-irons, and has walked with a limp ever since. She studied at Leeds College of Art, subsequently gaining many public commissions in mosaic and stained glass. When living aboard Hosanna, she would make cloisonné enamel artefacts. She is a contributor to The Barge Association's magazine Blue Flag, having taken over her late husband's column.

== Maritime lives ==
Biil and Laurel sailed the world's oceans for many years in Fare Well, a 55' LOA 34-ton ketch that they had built themselves. During this period they wrote the best-selling Sell Up and Sail, a book of advice to others on whether to (and how to) abandon life on land for an ocean cruising lifestyle.

After many years at sea, they chose to tour the inland waterways of Europe. They bought and fitted out Hosanna, a 1920s-era 87' steel Luxemotor Dutch sailing barge. Hosanna became schooner rigged, with up to six easily handled sails. Hosanna's three masts were stepped in tabernacles so that they could fold flat to allow passage under canal bridges. Hosanna had a large Cummins diesel main engine, and a smaller Perkins stand-by wing engine to one side. After the Cummins engine eventually failed, because its wet liners had rusted through, the Perkins performed well, but its off-centre mounting caused steering difficulties. When the defunct Cummins was lifted out in Great Yarmouth, instead of being replaced by another big engine, Bill decided to instal two more Perkins engines and propellers. Hosanna now had three similar Perkins engines, one in the centre, and one on either side. In calm canals, just the central engine alone would be used; the other two would be engaged at sea or in fast rivers, or when manoeuvering.

The Coopers took Hosanna through the European inland waterways from Saint-Valery-sur-Somme to the Camargue, where they spent time wintering and writing A Spell in Wild France. They then sailed the Mediterranean Sea to Greece, wintering at Porto Heli in the Peloponnese. In due course, they retraced their steps, returning to the UK to replace the worn-out Cummins engine. Eventually, they crossed to Calais, from whence they began an epic voyage to the Black Sea through the Rhine–Main–Danube Canal, a journey said to have been "much more difficult and dangerous than any of their ocean crossings". These voyages were the subjects of three of their books. On their return to the UK, the BBC published an article of their exploits.

After their voyages in Europe, and needing a bespoke boat more suited to their advancing years, they sold Hosanna and commissioned the construction of a 12m x 4.4m flat-bottomed steel liveaboard motor boat named Faraway. An unusual twin-engined vessel, designed by Bill, Faraway had a forward wheelhouse, with the rationale that: "There is no advantage in having a wheelhouse aft. It is a tradition based on the fact that early rudders were activated by heavy chains and it was a good idea to keep these as short as possible". They were in their eighties when they began cruising in Faraway, using her for "very pleasant cruising round Flanders and Northern France".

The couple married in 1952 and have a son and a daughter.

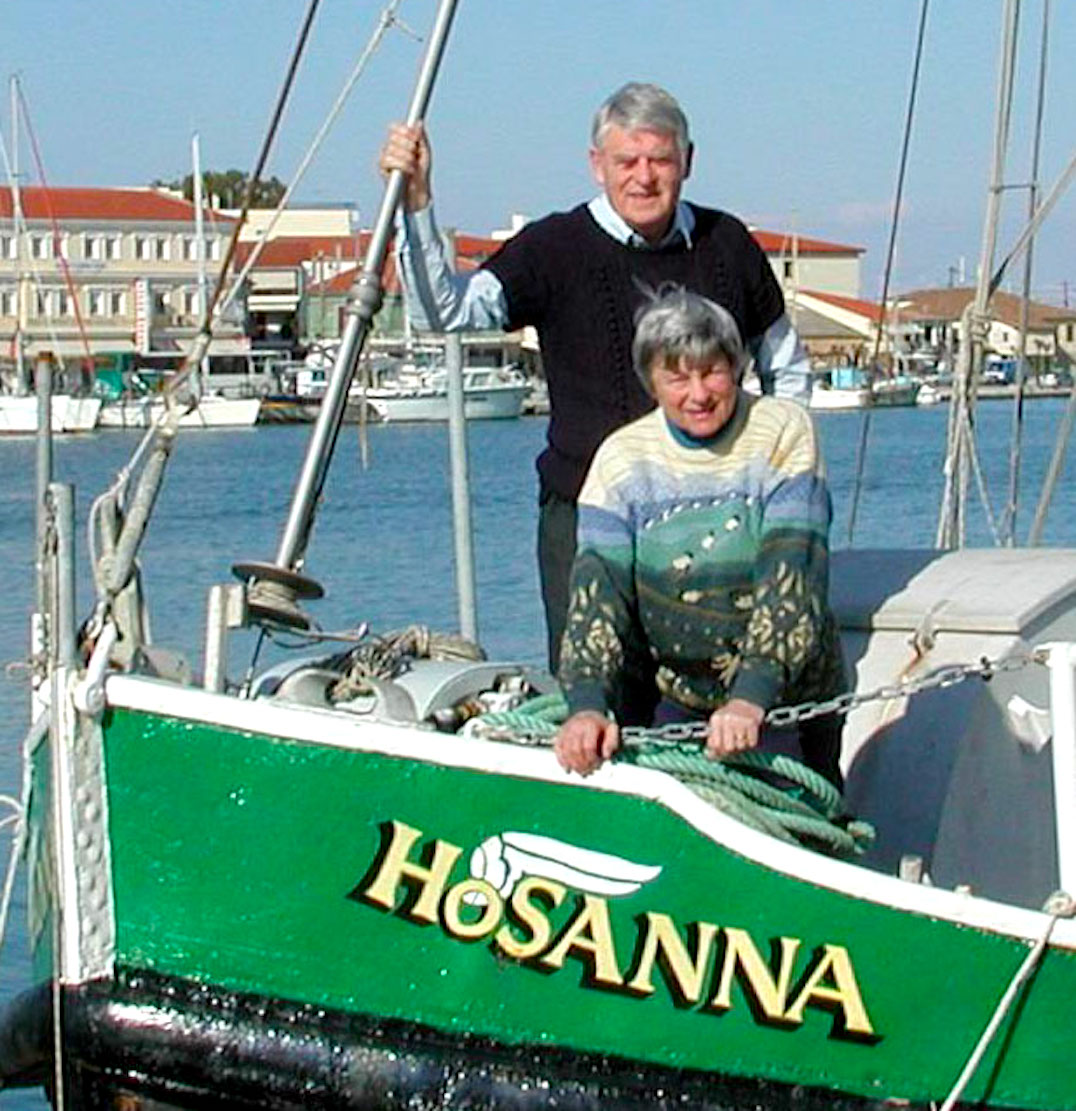
Bill & Laurel Cooper aboard "Hosanna"

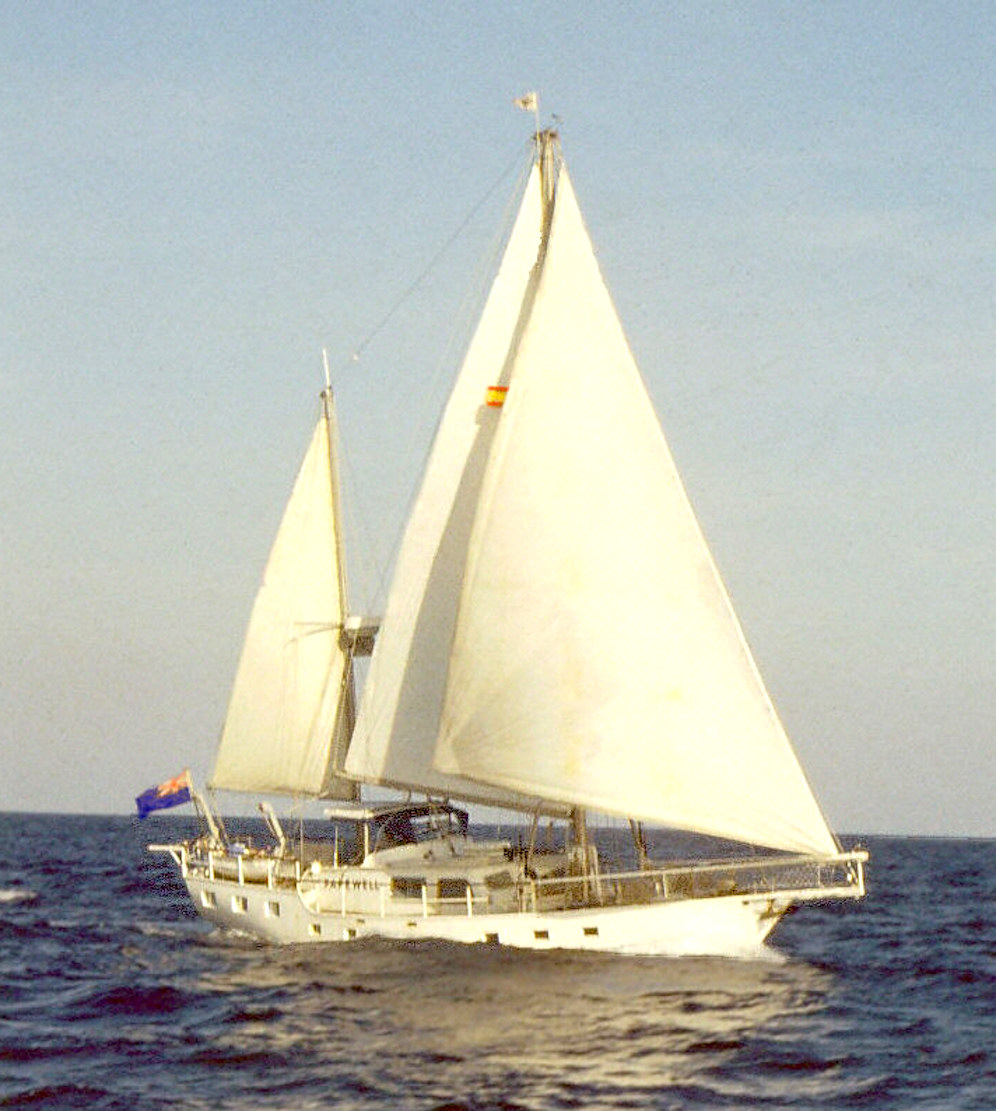
Steel Ketch "Farewell"

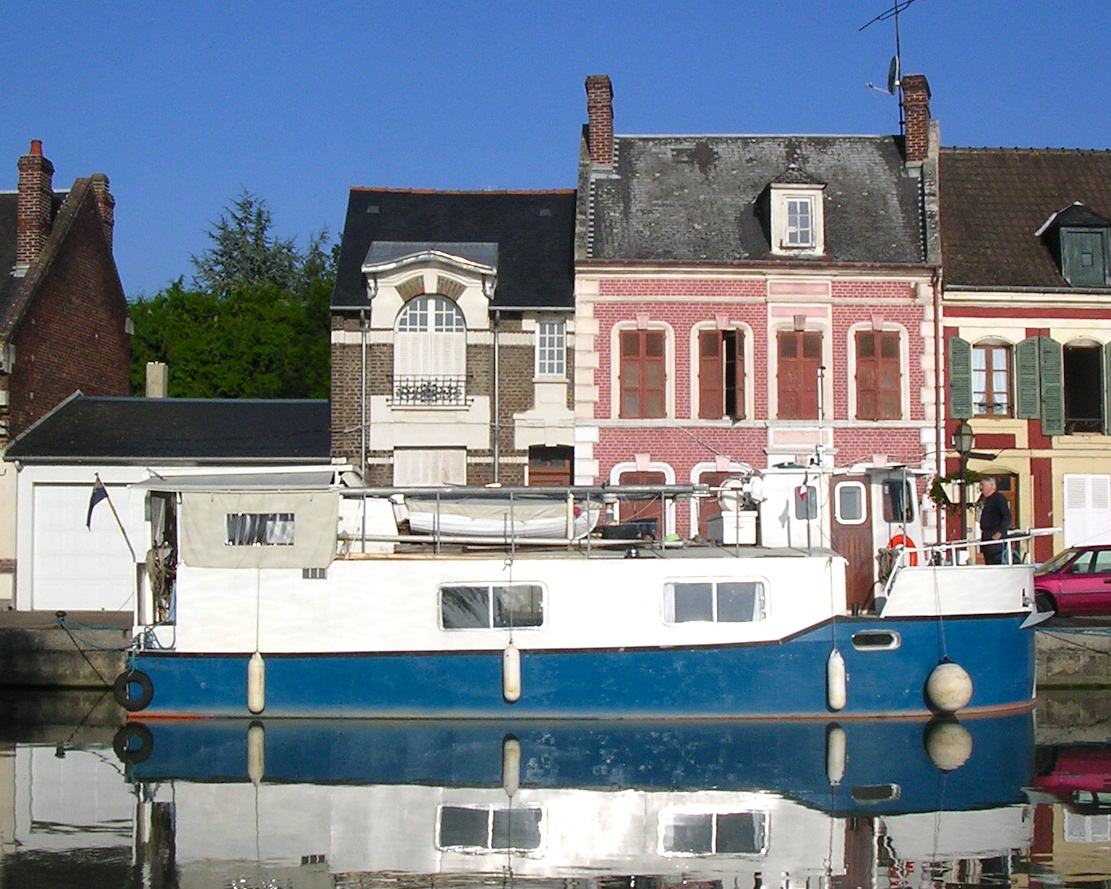
One-off design "Faraway"

Bill Cooper RN

== Selected publications ==
Bill & Laurel Cooper (co-authors)

- Sell up and Sail: Taking the Ulysses option - Adlard Coles Nautical - 1986 - ISBN 9780713674033
- Watersteps through France - Adlard Coles Nautical - 1991 - ISBN 9780749310165
- A Spell in Wild France - Methuen - 1992 - ISBN 9780413667205
- Sail into the Sunset: A handbook for Ancient Mariners - Adlard Coles Nautical - 1994 - ISBN 9780713639513
- Watersteps round Europe - Adlard Coles Nautical - 1996 - ISBN 9780713646375
- Back Door to Byzantium - Adlard Coles Nautical - 1997 - ISBN 9780955035104
- Sell up and Cruise the Inland Waterways - Adlard Coles Nautical - 2010 - ISBN 9780713679885

William Cooper (sole author)

- Seago: A Sea Story - Upfront Publishing - 2014 - ISBN 9781784561437
