= 1922 Dissolution Honours =

British government recognitions

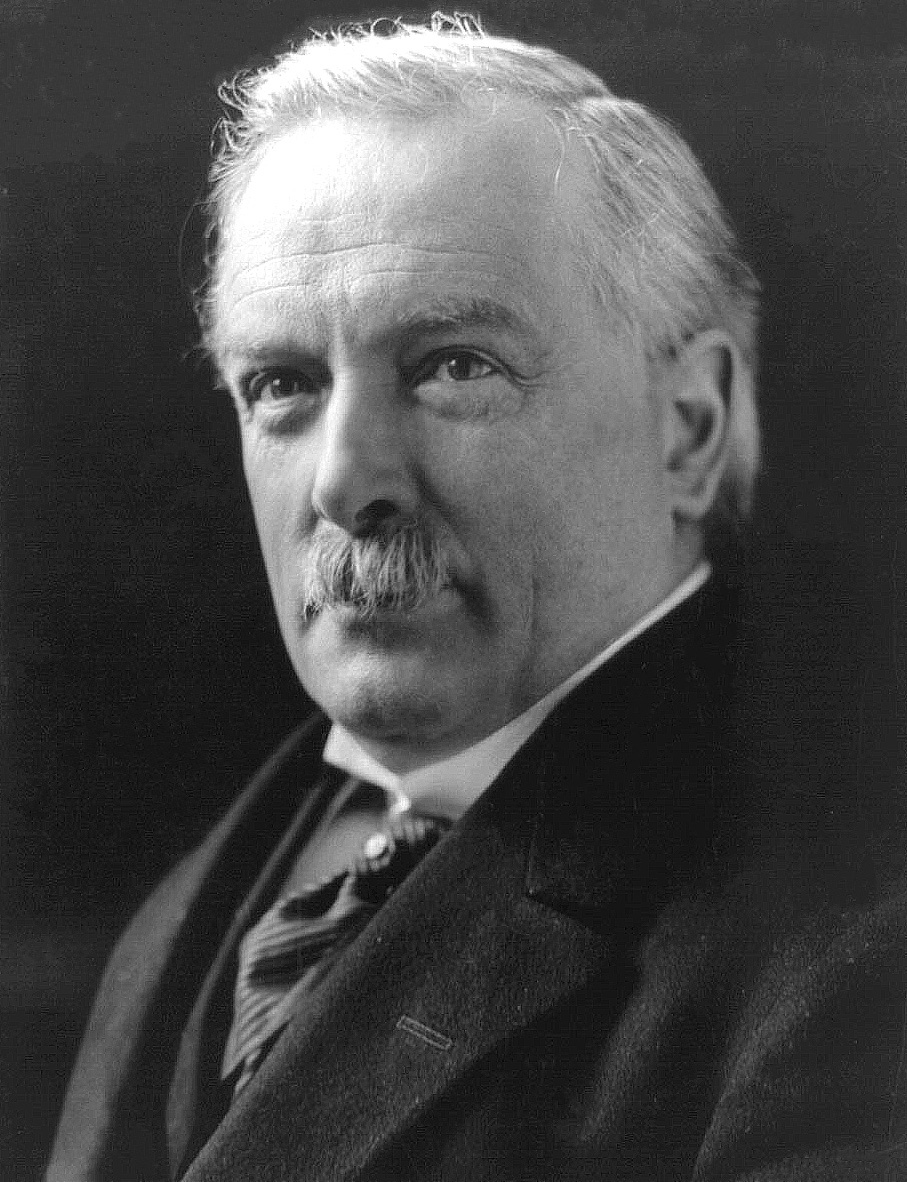
Outgoing Prime Minister David Lloyd George in 1919

The 1922 Dissolution Honours List was issued on 19 October 1922 at the advice of the outgoing Prime Minister, David Lloyd George.

== Earldoms ==
- The Rt Hon. Frederick Edwin Smith, 1st Viscount Birkenhead
- The Rt Hon. Horace Brand, 1st Viscount Farquhar, for political services.

== Viscountcies ==
- The Rt Hon. Arthur Hamilton, 1st Baron Lee of Fareham, GBE, KCB
- The Rt Hon. William Hesketh, 1st Baron Leverhulme, for public services.

== Baronies ==
- Sir John Henry Bethell, Bt.
- The Rt Hon. Sir Edward Alfred Goulding, Bt.
- The Rt Hon. Sir Joseph Paton Maclay, Bt., LLD, JP
- Lt-Col The Rt Hon. Francis Bingham Mildmay

== Privy Council ==
- Lt-Col Sir John Gilmour, Bt.
- Sir Samuel Roberts, Bt.
- Sir Arthur Tutton James Salvidge, KBE, for political and municipal services.
- Sir William Sutherland, KCB
- William Dudley Ward
- Lieutenant-Commander Edward Hilton Young, DSO, DSC, RNVR

== Baronets ==
- Major Henry Leonard Campbell Brassey
- The Rt Hon. Sir William Bull
- Sir Ellis William Hume-Williams, KBE, KC.
- Alderman Max Muspratt
- The Rt Hon. Sir Ernest Murray Pollock, KBE, KC

== Knighthoods ==
- Benjamin Leonard (or Lennard) Cherry, Lawyer and Parliamentary draughtsman
- Lieutenant-Commander Harry Warden Stanley Chilcott, JP
- John Cecil Davies, Steel manufacturer
- Walford Davies
- Neville Jodrell, MP
- Miles Walker Mattinson, KC
- John William Pratt
- William Price, JP
- Lieutenant Wilfrid Hart Sugden
- Dr. Richard Runciman Terry, Mus.D, FRCO
- Arthur Underhill, MA, LLD, Barrister
- Alexander Wood, Provost of Partick

== Companions of Honour ==
=== Member ===
- Sir Hall Caine, KBE, for services to literature.
- The Rt Hon. Winston Churchill
- Sir Vincent Evans
- The Rev'd John Henry Jowett

== Order of St. Michael and St. George ==
=== Knight Grand Cross (GCMG) ===
- Lt-Col Sir John Robert Chancellor, KCMG, DSO

== The Most Honourable Order of the Bath ==
=== Knight Commander (KCB) ===
- Alfred William Cope, CB
- John Thomas Davies, CB, CVO

=== Companion (CB) ===
- Hon. Albert Edward Alexander Napier

== Order of the British Empire ==
=== Knight Grand Cross (GBE) ===
- The Rt Hon. John Herbert Lewis
- Sir Philip Sassoon, Bt., CMG

=== Commander (CBE) ===
- Eric Allden
- Dr Harvey Hilliard
- Pembroke Wicks
- John Wilson MBE
