= Bow (watercraft) =

Forward part of the hull of a ship

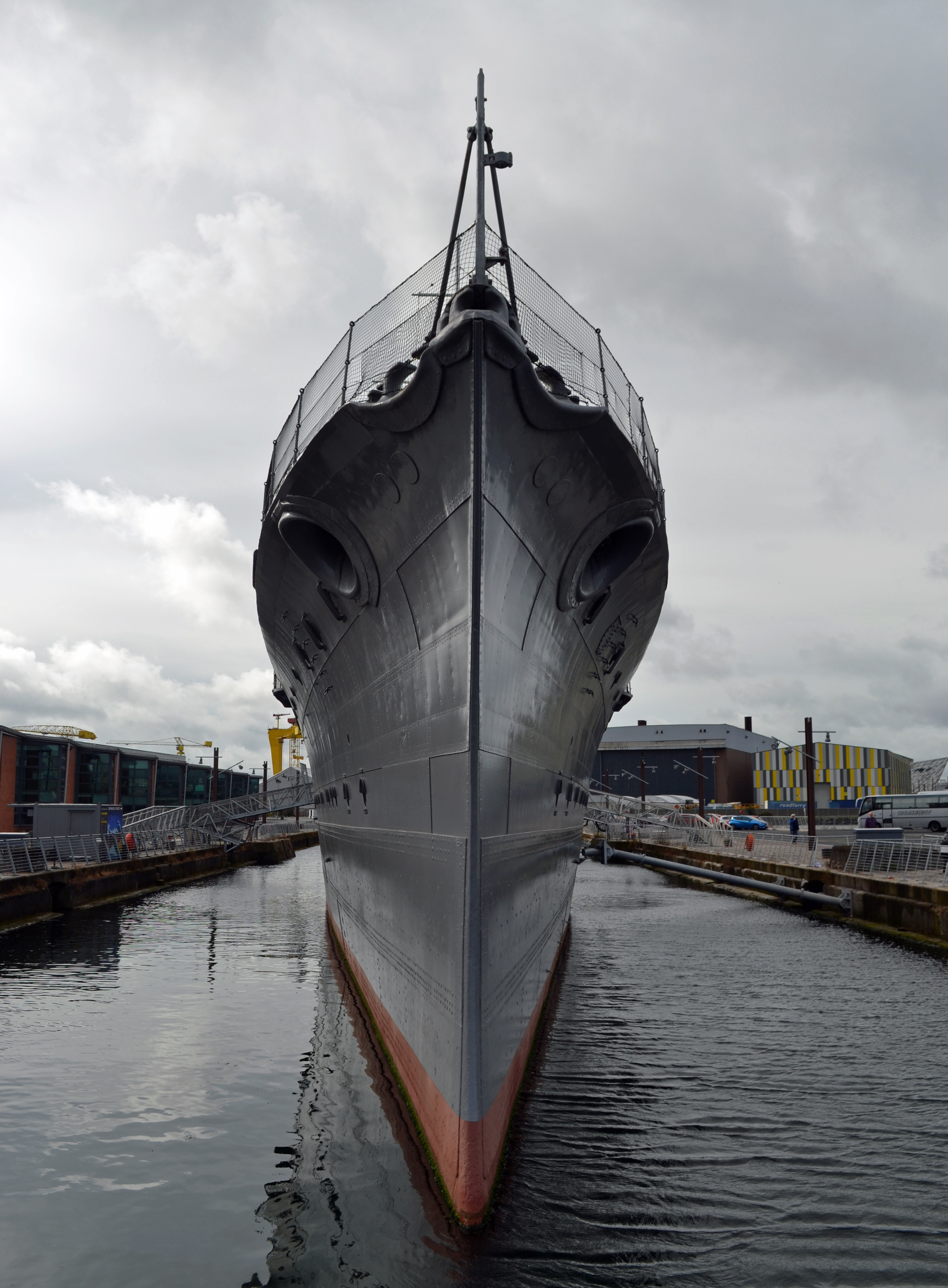
The prow of HMS Caroline (1914)

The bow (/baʊ/) is the forward part of the hull of a ship or boat, the point that is farthest forward when the vessel is underway in the usual direction. The aft end of the boat is the stern.

Prow may be used as a synonym for bow, or it may refer specifically to the foremost part of the bow above the waterline.

== Function ==
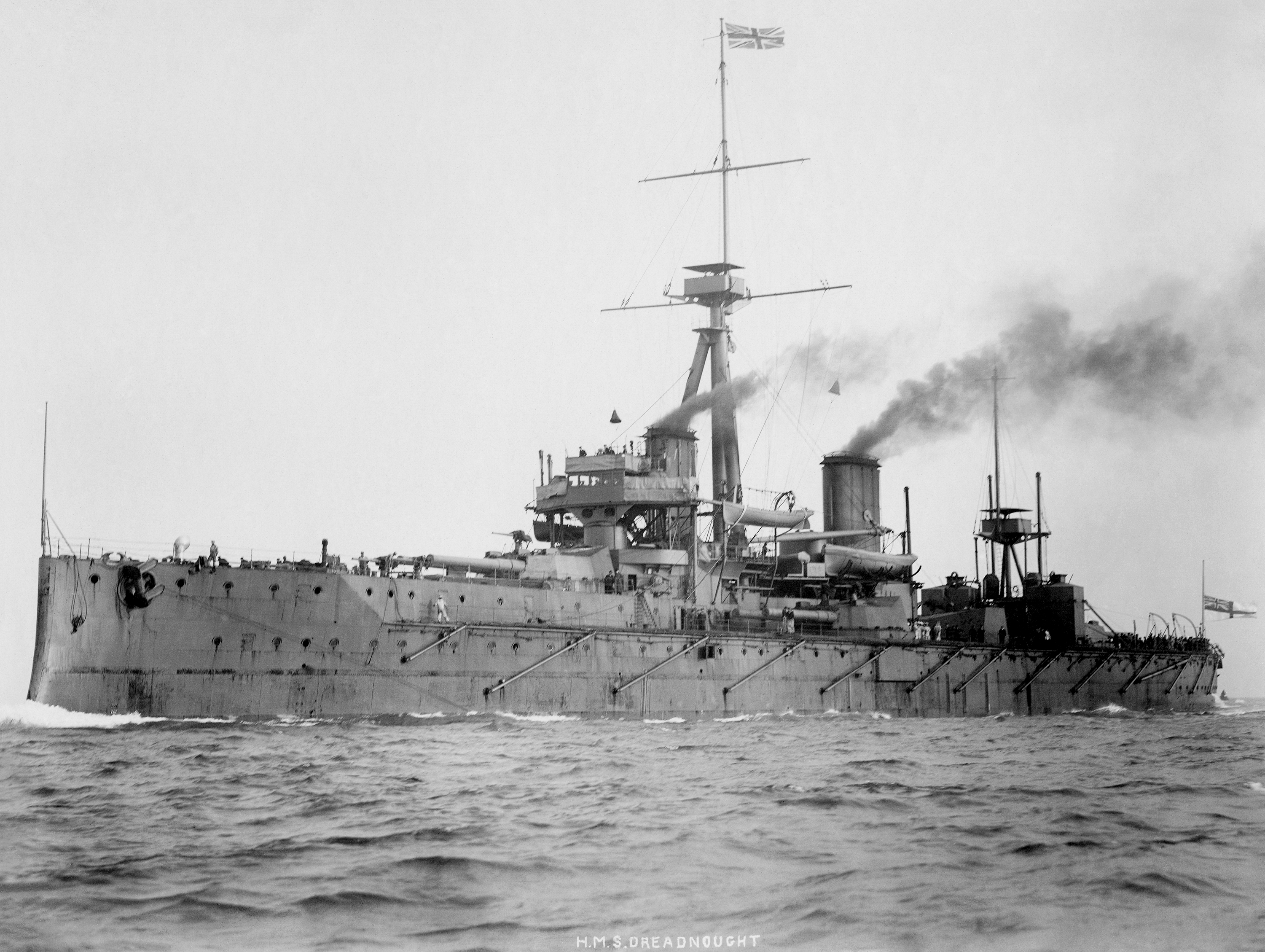
HMS Dreadnought, with an inverted bow

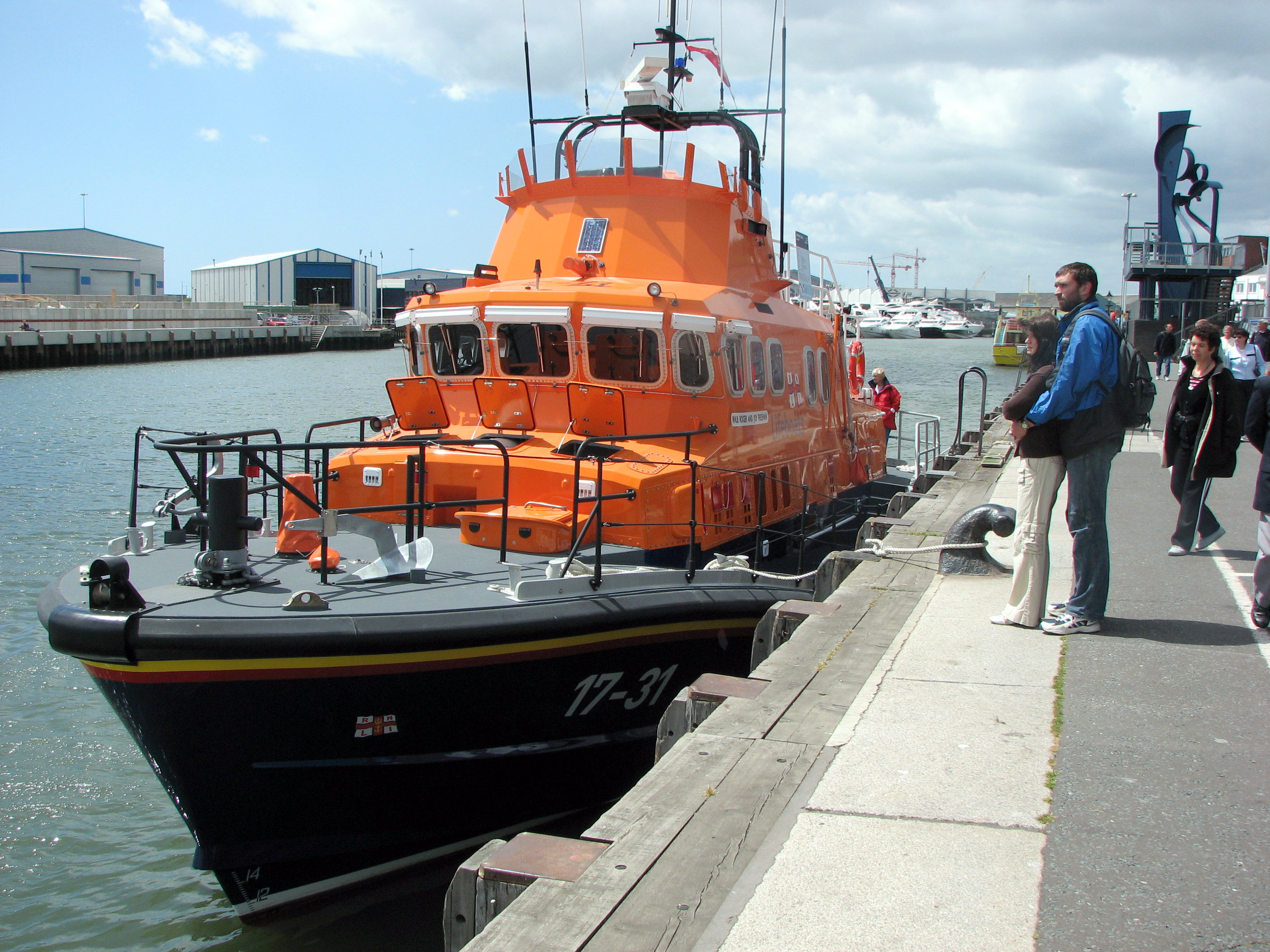
The seaworthy bow of a Severn class lifeboat in Poole

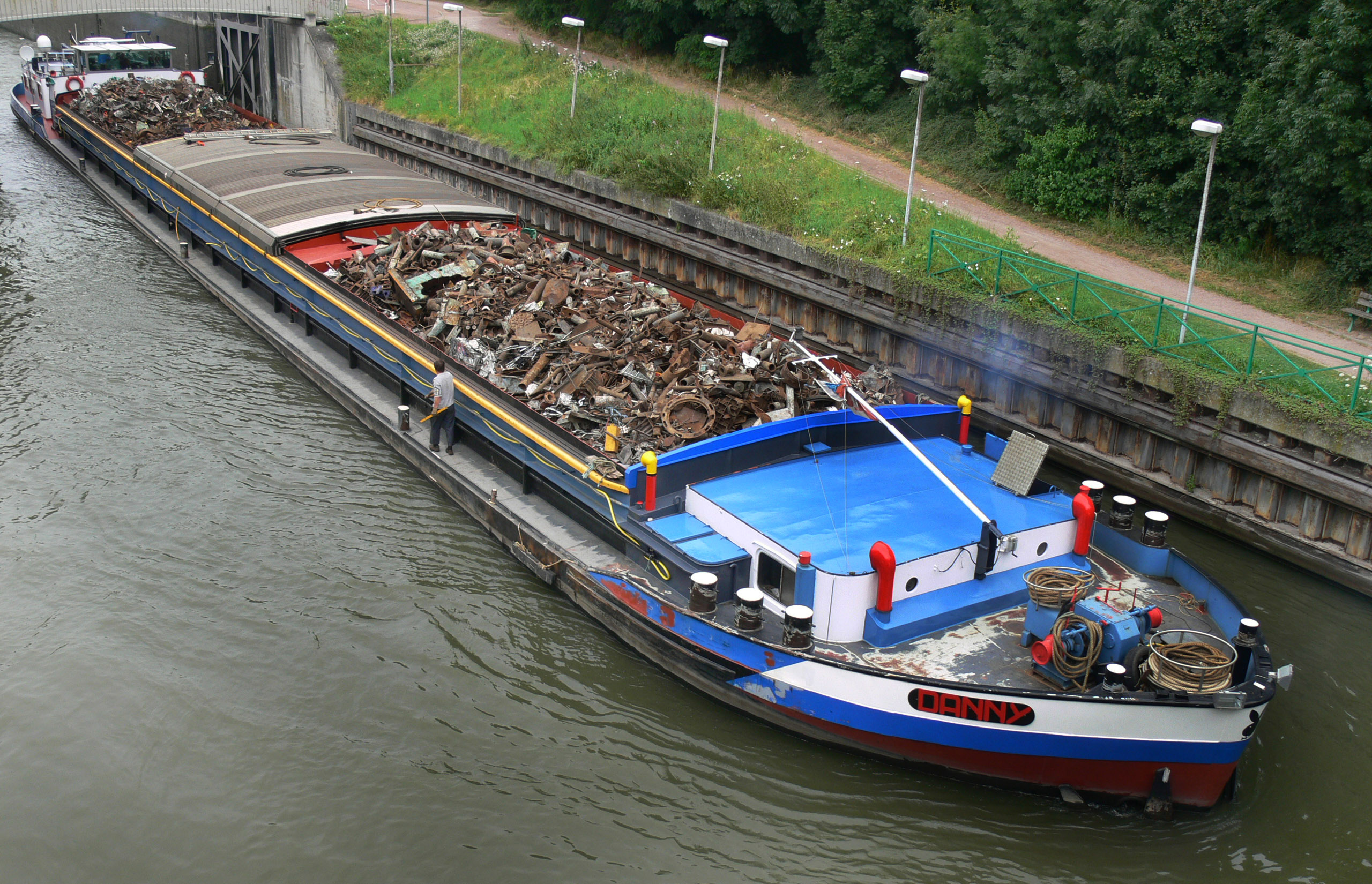
A heavily laden barge in France. Note the bluff bow and the limited freeboard.

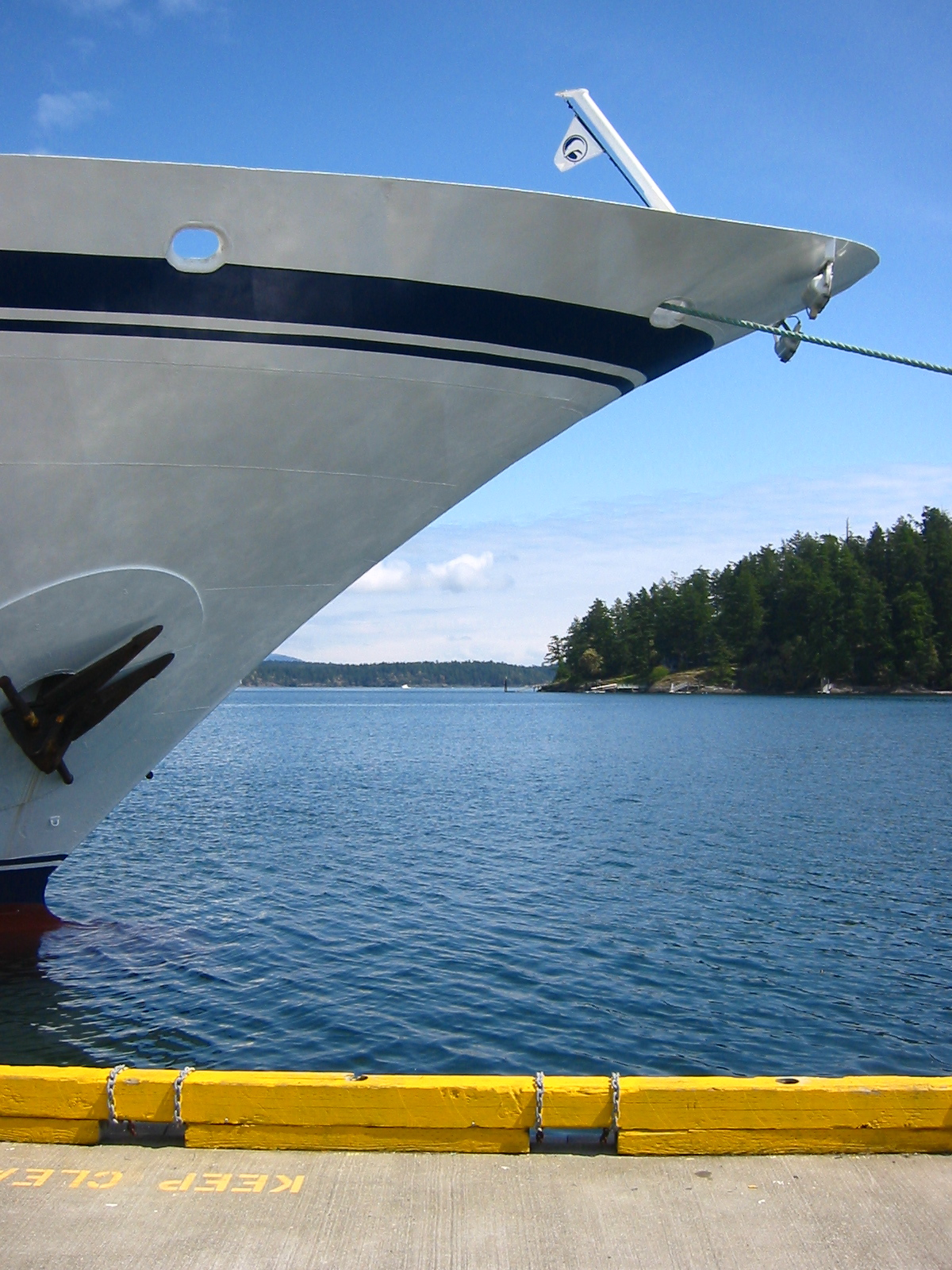
Flared bow of a cruise ship

A ship's bow should be designed to enable the hull to pass efficiently through the water. Bow shapes vary according to the speed of the boat, the seas or waterways being navigated, and the vessel's function. Where sea conditions are likely to promote pitching, it is useful if the bow provides reserve buoyancy; a flared bow (a raked stem with flared topsides) is ideal to reduce the amount of water shipped over the bow.

Ideally, the bow's shape should both reduce water resistance and block water from regularly washing over the top of it. Large commercial barges on inland waterways rarely meet big waves and may have remarkably little freeboard at the bow, whereas fast military vessels operating offshore must be able to cope with heavy seas. On slower ships like tankers and barges, a fuller bow shape is used to maximise the volume of the ship for a given length. The bow may be reinforced to serve as an ice-breaker.

The forward part of the bow is called the "stem" or "forestem". Traditionally, the stem was a timber (or metal) post into which side planks (or plates) were joined. Some boats such as the Dutch barge "aak" or the clinker-built Viking longships have no straight stem, having instead a curved prow.

== Types ==
Some types of bows are:

Notable bow types
Straight-stem bow

Plumb bow

Raked bow

Flared bow

Clipper bow

Bulbous bow

Inverted bow

Ram bow

High-chin spoon bow

Low-chin spoon bow

== Etymology ==
From Middle Dutch boech (modern spelling boeg). Although "bow" has the same ultimate origin as "bough" (from the Old English bóg, or bóh (shoulder, the bough of a tree), the nautical term is unrelated, being unknown in this use in English before 1600.

=== Prow ===
The "prow" (French: proue, Latin: prora) is the foremost part of a ship's bow above the waterline. The terms "prow" and "bow" are often used interchangeably to describe the foremost part of a ship and its surrounding parts.

== See also ==
- Boat building
- Bow (rowing)
- Deck
- Figurehead
- Glossary of nautical terms (disambiguation)
- Naval architecture
- Port
- Shipbuilding
- Starboard
- Stem (ship)
- Superstructure
