= Arthur Underhill =

British legal scholar

Arthur Underhill KC
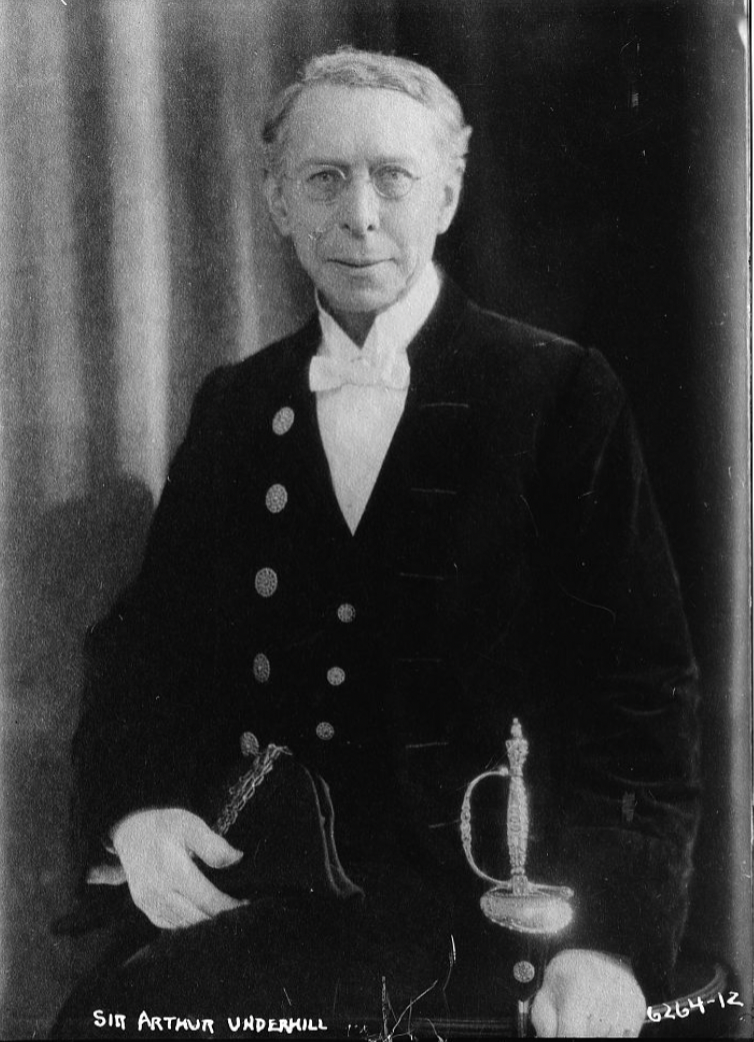
- Sir Arthur Underhill, legal scholar
- Born: 10 October 1850; Wolverhampton
- Died: 1939 (aged 88–89)
- Occupation: King's Council
- Known for: A Practical and Concise Manual of the Procedure of the Chancery Division of the High Court of Justice both in Actions and Matters; A Concise Guide to Modern Equity Being a Course of Nine Lectures; A Summary of the Law of Torts; The Line of Least Resistance
- Spouse: Alice Lucy Ironmonger
- Children: Evelyn Underhill

Academic background
- Education: Trinity College Dublin

Academic work
- Discipline: Law
- Sub-discipline: Torts, Property law
- Institutions: Lincoln's Inn

Sir Arthur Underhill KC (1850 - 1939) was a legal scholar and barrister of the nineteenth century. He was the author of many works on legal torts and property law and is noted for being the father of the famed mystic and peace activist, Evelyn Underhill.

== Childhood and family background ==
Underhill was born on 10 October 1850 into an upper middle-class family in Wolverhampton, where his father practiced as a solicitor. The Underhill family tree, which Arthur Underhill took pains to trace, went back to a William Underhill in the fifteenth century. It was this ancestor's arms and motto, Vive et Ama, which Arthur Underhill later revived and used. In Tudor times there was one Underhill who was known as the hot-gospeller. Later in the eighteenth century a certain John Underhill was a stout Nonconformist divine, but the family returned to the Established Church. As a child, he was known as a voracious reader, carrying out books from his father's library to read in his house among the treetops. His lifelong interest in sailing can also be dated to childhood. Religion did not play a large part in his upbringing, although his younger brother, Charles, attended Cambridge and later became an Anglican priest.

== Early career and life ==
Underhill was educated at one of the Woodard Schools, and later studied law at Trinity College Dublin where he graduated with an LLD. He had initially trained in his father's office as a solicitor but decided to leave that side of the legal profession and practise instead as a barrister. Upon graduating from Trinity, Underhill was called to the Bar, entering Lincoln’s Inn in 1872. It was a risky decision, and his memoirs disclose the struggles of his first ten years. In 1874, he married Alice Lucy Ironmonger, daughter of a Wolverhampton Justice of the Peace. Shortly after his daughter Evelyn’s birth in 1875, Underhill left Wolverhampton for London.

== Relationship with daughter Evelyn ==
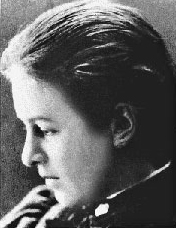
Evelyn Underhill, Arthur Underhill's famous spiritualist daughter

Although Arthur Underhill was a notable legal scholar during his own lifetime, he is primarily known today as the father of one of Britain's most well-known and revered spiritual figures of the twentieth century, Evelyn Underhill. Evelyn’s biographers have suggested that Underhill had a ‘distant and cool’ relationship with his daughter in her early life. Margaret Cropper suggested that ‘Sir Arthur Underhill really discovered his daughter in her late teens, and became aware then of her good brain and penetrating ability.’ Despite this early distance, Cropper noted that family life was ‘secure and affectionate’ and that ‘Evelyn remained through their whole lives very much at her parents' call and very sure of their value.’

His daughter shared her father's interest in the law. Unlike his famous daughter, however, Underhill was not religiously observant. While it appears that Underhill exerted little influence on his daughter’s interest in religion, his autobiography reveals he was a convinced Deist, and argued against the sufficiency of science to produce a satisfying view of life. Underhill provided a number of educational privileges to Evelyn, including travelling with his daughter to mainland Europe in 1890. The trip, which Evelyn repeated through her early adulthood, enabled her to discover a kind of religious life and worship that was unknown to her in England. She later recalled that the profoundly moving European art that she encountered in her travels provided rich material for her works of fiction.

== Authored legal work ==
Underhill was considered an expert on torts and private trusts. Some of his more famous works include A Practical and Concise Manual of the Procedure of the Chancery Division of the High Court of Justice both in Actions and Matters (1881); A Concise Guide to Modern Equity Being a Course of Nine Lectures [revised and enlarged] (1885); A Summary of the Law of Torts, or, Wrongs Independent of Contract (1911); The Line of Least Resistance: An Easy but Effective Method of Simplifying the Law of Real Property (1919) all published by Butterworth in London. He also produced an autobiography, Change and Decay: The Recollections and Reflections of an Octogenarian Bencher (London: Butterworth, 1938).

== Yachtsmanship ==
Underhill was an accomplished yachtsman. In 1881 he founded and later became Commodore of the Royal Cruising Club, earning a Master Mariner's Certiticate (Cruising) in 1890. He also authored Our Silver Streak, or the Yachtsman's Guide to the English Channel: Simple Navigation for Home Waters; and Courses and Distances round the British Isles.

== Knighthood ==
Underhill was knighted in 1922 as part of the 1922 Dissolution Honours.
