= Richard Turrill McMullen =

British yachtsman (1830–1891)

Richard Turrill McMullen (1830–1891) was a British yachtsman known as a pioneer of small sail boat cruising.

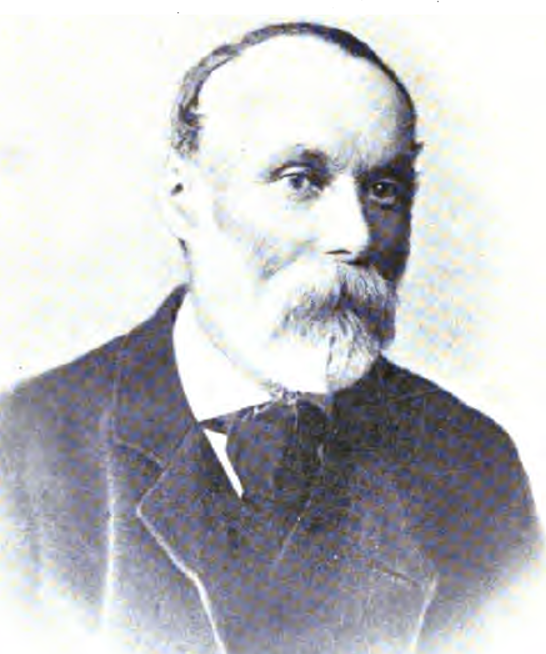
Richard McMullen

== Sailing Leo ==
In 1850, at age 20, McMullen decided to teach himself sailing and commissioned the construction of a 20-foot half-decked 3-ton cutter, Leo. At this time coastal and ocean sailing was considered to be only possible with large vessels and a professional crew. To attempt to sail in the open waters around the British Isles in a small vessel handled by an amateur was so dangerous that to attempt to do so was considered extremely reckless.

Pyceon 5 miles to Dover, illustration from the book Down Channel by RT McMullen

McMullen's first cruise began at Greenwich and proceeded some twenty miles down the Thames as far as Gravesend with a Thames waterman in charge. After this very short cruise he declared that "This was the only apprenticeship I served."

His second cruise nearly ended in disaster as he collided with a collier off Charlton and the boat almost capsized. He then sailed out to the Nore, this being the point where the Thames is deemed to end and the North Sea begins. In this cruise he again collided with another vessel at 5am, which brought the sleeping crew angrily up to separate the two vessels. This was such a frightening experience that it was a full year before McMullen had recovered enough to contemplate another voyage.

Between 1850 and 1857 McMullen sailed Leo gradually further and further afield with the aim of eventually reaching Land's End off the Cornish coast. As he was approaching Poole he encountered a severe storm but managed to make harbor and safety in Weymouth. At this time no-one was sailing small vessels in this manner and as McMullen sheltered for three days in Weymouth harbor he and Leo were the subject of much interest and attention from the people of the town, and he commented that, "For three days the Leo was the Lion of Weymouth. Being moored close to the quay, we were under close inspection of a greater or less number of people."

Sirius Voyage 1863

The Penzance harbor book has an entry on 10 August 1855: "The Leo, 3 tons, of London, McMullen master and owner, 6d.;", McMullen goes on to explain, "which sum was not demanded of me, but was paid by the quaymaster, and entered for curiosity."

Sailing on the open sea in extremely violent storms McMullen was the first person to realize that a small vessel could survive such difficult conditions if it stayed in open water and rode out the storm rather than trying to make for port where the dangers were actually highest, even for much larger vessels.

== Sailing Sirius and Orion ==
In 1861 McMullen had a second vessel built, the Sirius. McMullen was so pleased with the handling qualities of Leo, and Sirius' was built along similar lines, but larger at 11 tons and with a round stern, something no other yachts had at that time.

In 1863 McMullen and two other crew sailed around the British Isles, first touching at Aberdeen after nine days open sailing from Greenhithe, Sirius then sailed over the north of Scotland through the Pentland Firth, down the Western Isles through the East Irish Sea, around Land's End and back to the Thames. A total track of 2,640 miles logged covered in 28 days. Whilst at the Island of Skye he describes his visit thus, "June 28th 1863, 9:15am. Sailed through Hoan Island Sound; 11pm rounded Cape Wrath. June 30th 10:30am anchored in Loch Staffin, Isle of Skye, and, with a boy of sixteen as a guide, ascended 1,500ft to the famous Rock of Quiraing, accompanied most of the way up and down by a crowd of good natured little urchins in tatters who could not speak a word of English."

In 1865 McMullen had another vessel constructed, Orion, which was lengthened in 1873 and rigged as a yawl thus finally making 19.5 tons. During a cruise to Cherbourg he fell out with the two crew he was recommended to help him manage the vessel. McMullen commented that on the voyage they were lazy and always complaining about the rigors of life at sea. After Orion made port in France they both abandoned him. When McMullen subsequently heard that they were boasting in the town that they had left him in the lurch, he decided to sail Orion back to England single-handed, which he did with some difficulty. The title of his second book refers to this incident in parentheses.

== Last voyages ==
McMullen began also sailing a smaller vessel single-handed, the Procyon, a 7-ton vessel he had built in 1867 and lengthened in 1870. In 1887 McMullen sailed Orion around Britain and Ireland in 22 days.

His last voyage was in 1891 where he died at sea aged 61. McMullen set sail in the 6-ton lugger Perseus solo bound for France after calling in at Eastbourne to post a letter on 13 July. On 15 July his vessel was boarded by some French fishermen and McMullen was found dead of a heart attack in the cockpit of the vessel with his hand still on the tiller. He was brought ashore at Beuzeval in France and buried there.

== Legacy ==
The yachting exploits of McMullen are considered important as previously sailing was either classed as racing or luxury cruising, both of which required big yachts, professional crews, and therefore large sums of money. As the middle-class in Victorian Britain grew, it looked for ways in which to enjoy the proceeds of their efforts and the concept of leisure expanded rapidly through the population from the mid-19th century onwards. A significant interest in travel and adventure evolved and at the time McMullen was doing his experimental cruises in Leo, the "Golden Age" of mountaineering was also beginning, led by British adventurers such as Alfred Wills. It is in this setting that McMullen is widely regarded as the pioneer of this new phenomenon of adventurous leisure pursuits with particular regard to small boat sail cruising. Rather than luxury and competition, the interest was rather in the coast and the sea, and an amateur learning the considerable technical skills required to competently skipper a small boat in coastal sailing, especially in very challenging weather conditions, which in itself required considerable bravery to master as well as skill. The pleasure and satisfaction derived in achieving this was augmented by the fact that such a pursuit could take the crew to previously difficult to visit coastal areas of Britain, Europe and the Mediterranean, often an important aspect of pleasure cruising for Victorian adventurers.
