= Timothy Spall: ...at Sea =

British television series

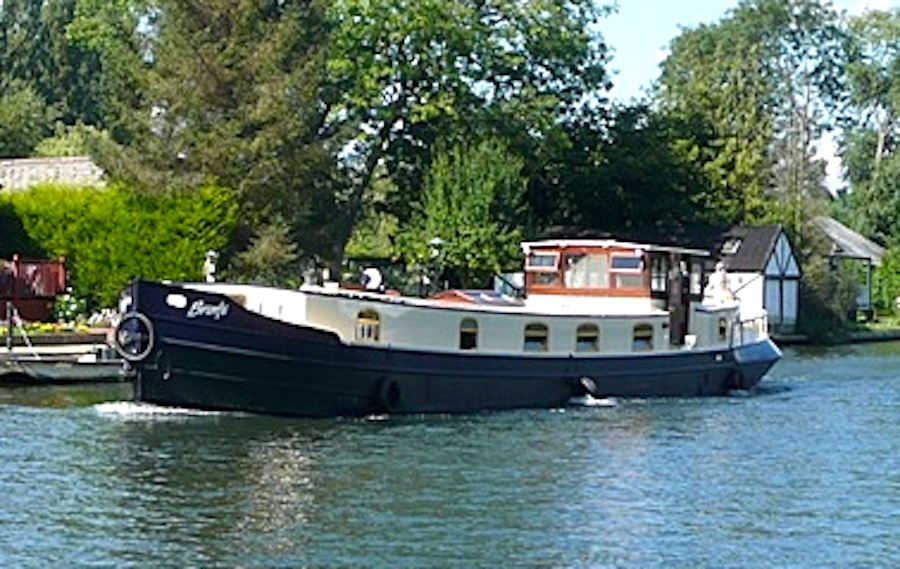
A broadly similar Dutch barge, (except The Princess Matilda has no raised aft cabin).

Timothy Spall at Sea series is a set of three BBC Four television series that follows the voyage of actor Timothy Spall and his wife Shane as they take their Dutch barge, The Princess Matilda, on a circumnavigation around the British Coast, with visits to Northern Ireland and the Isle of Man.

The Princess Matilda was designed and built by Peter Nicholls Yacht Builders Ltd. She is a 52-foot-long (16 m) 35-tonne steel-hulled seagoing Category B Dutch barge.

== Series ==
=== Timothy Spall: Somewhere at Sea ===
This is the first series, though their trip from London to Cornwall was the first leg of their journey. The series comprised three programmes, covering their journey from Cornwall to the Bristol Channel and their winter mooring at Penarth in Cardiff Bay. It was first broadcast during May 2010.

=== Timothy Spall: Back at Sea ===
The second in the series comprised four programmes and covered the journey after the first winter's break. They travel around Wales to Liverpool, to the Isle of Man, Northern Ireland and Scotland. The last programme in this series follows them from the western Scottish Isles to winter port in Aberdeenshire via the Caledonian Canal and Loch Ness. The series was first broadcast in August 2011.

=== Timothy Spall: All at Sea ===
The third and final series in the set comprised four programmes, and covers the final leg of their journey. The final programme of the previous series left them needing a winter mooring in Eastern Scotland, and the first programme of this series tells of their winter mooring in Buckie and Banff, Aberdeenshire. This series follows them from Scotland to London, via North East England, the East of England, the River Medway and Chatham, and an RNLI RIB arrives to help finishing with their return up the River Thames. In August 2011, while filming an episode in the River Medway estuary, Spall and his wife became lost and had to be guided in by the Sheerness lifeboat. Arthur Ormesher and Nicki Wood were among the RNLI crew who escorted his barge to Queenborough Harbour.

The series was first broadcast in February and March 2012.
