= Dutch barge =

Flat-bottomed shoal-draught sailing barge

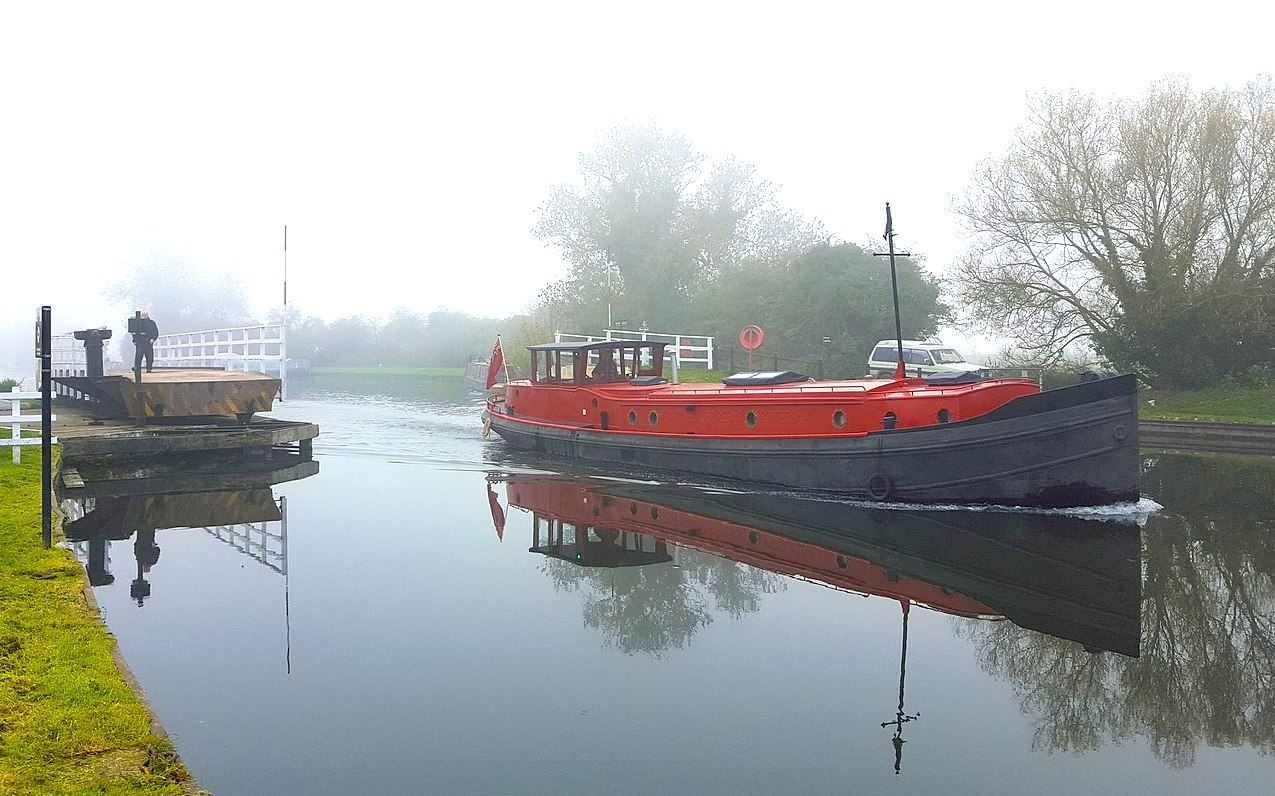
Motorised Dutch barge passing a swing bridge on the Gloucester & Sharpness Canal

A Dutch barge is a traditional flat-bottomed shoal-draught barge, originally used to carry cargo in the shallow Zuiderzee and the waterways of The Netherlands. There are many types of Dutch barge, with characteristics determined by regional conditions and traditions.

Originally, Dutch barges were sailing craft with wooden hulls. Today, while few wooden examples remain, there are many steel barges that are 100 years old or more. Although most Dutch barges have been converted to motor-propulsion, schuyt sailing contests are still held on the IJsselmeer and on the Wadden Sea (Waddenzee). Dutch barges have become popular live-aboard leisure craft, and brand-new "Dutch-style" examples continue to be built.

== The Dutch barge ==
A typical traditional Dutch barge would have gaff rig, a bluff bow and stern, a pair of leeboards and a large rudder. The leeboards and rudder would be raised by an arrangement of blocks and tackles. Schuyts engaged in eel fishing were said to have begun visiting London in the reign of Queen Elizabeth I and were granted the use of a berth there, which continued in use until the 20th century. Schuyts vary greatly in size from 15–40 metres (50–130 feet) in length, and are generally built lighter than an equivalent Humber barge since they were not designed to take the ground in the same way. Originally made of wood and powered by sail, Dutch barges today are almost exclusively made of steel and powered by diesel engines. Nowadays, the "duck tail" transom, prop and rudder arrangement is better suited to diesel propulsion than the sail-optimised hulls of older types.

Many Dutch barges have now been converted for pleasure or residential use. Modern steel-hulled "Dutch barges" are built in other countries (such as the UK and Germany) as well as in the Netherlands. Dutch barges are often used as liveaboards in English cities, especially London and Bristol, where, provided they have a permanent mooring, they give affordable accommodation near the city centres. Provided they are less than 14 feet in beam, Dutch barges are able to use the UK's 14 foot locks, but cannot navigate the narrow canals of the English Midlands, where the 18th century locks which date from the Industrial Revolution are only 7 feet wide.

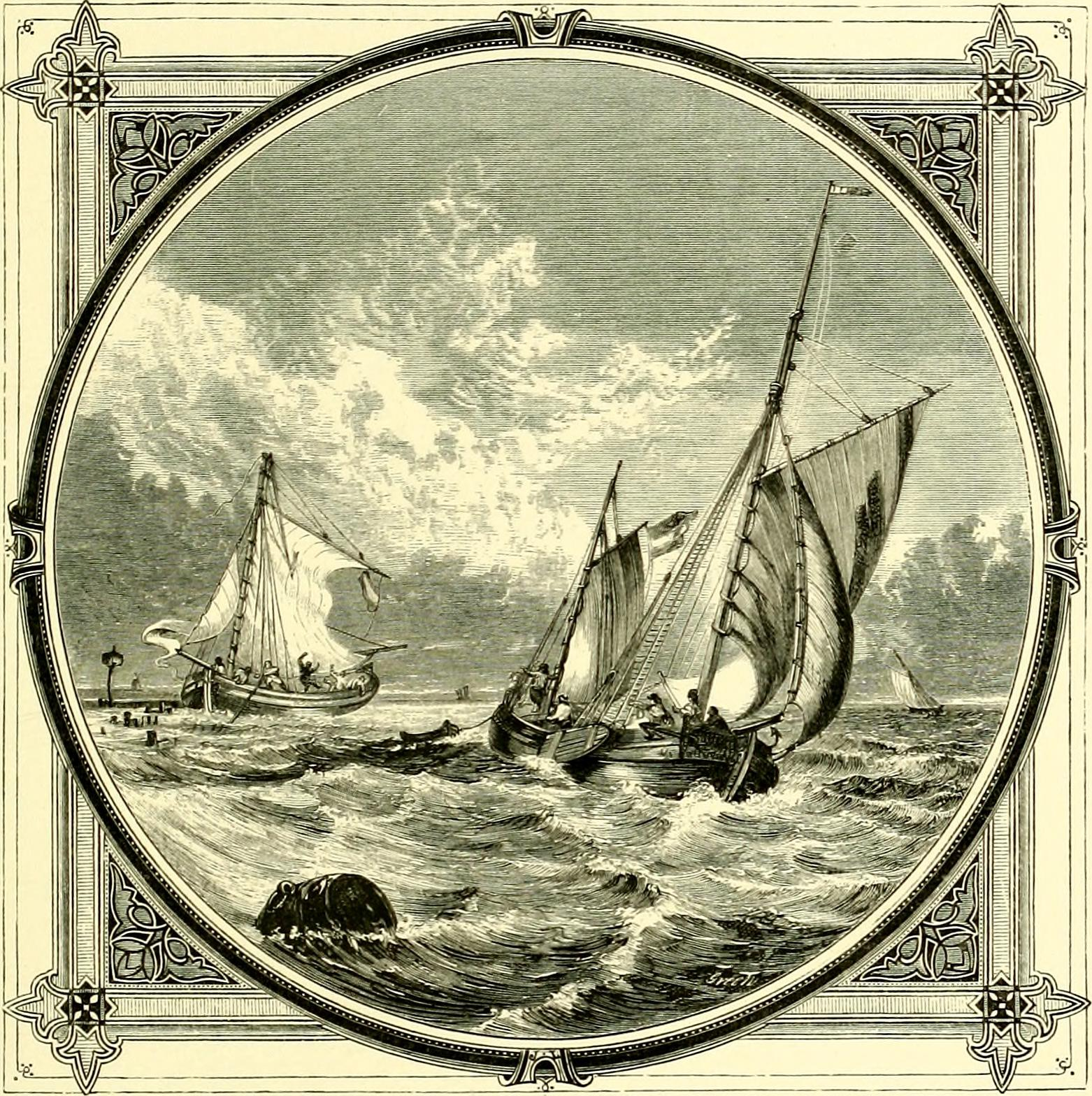
A pair of schuyts aground, in a print dated 1860

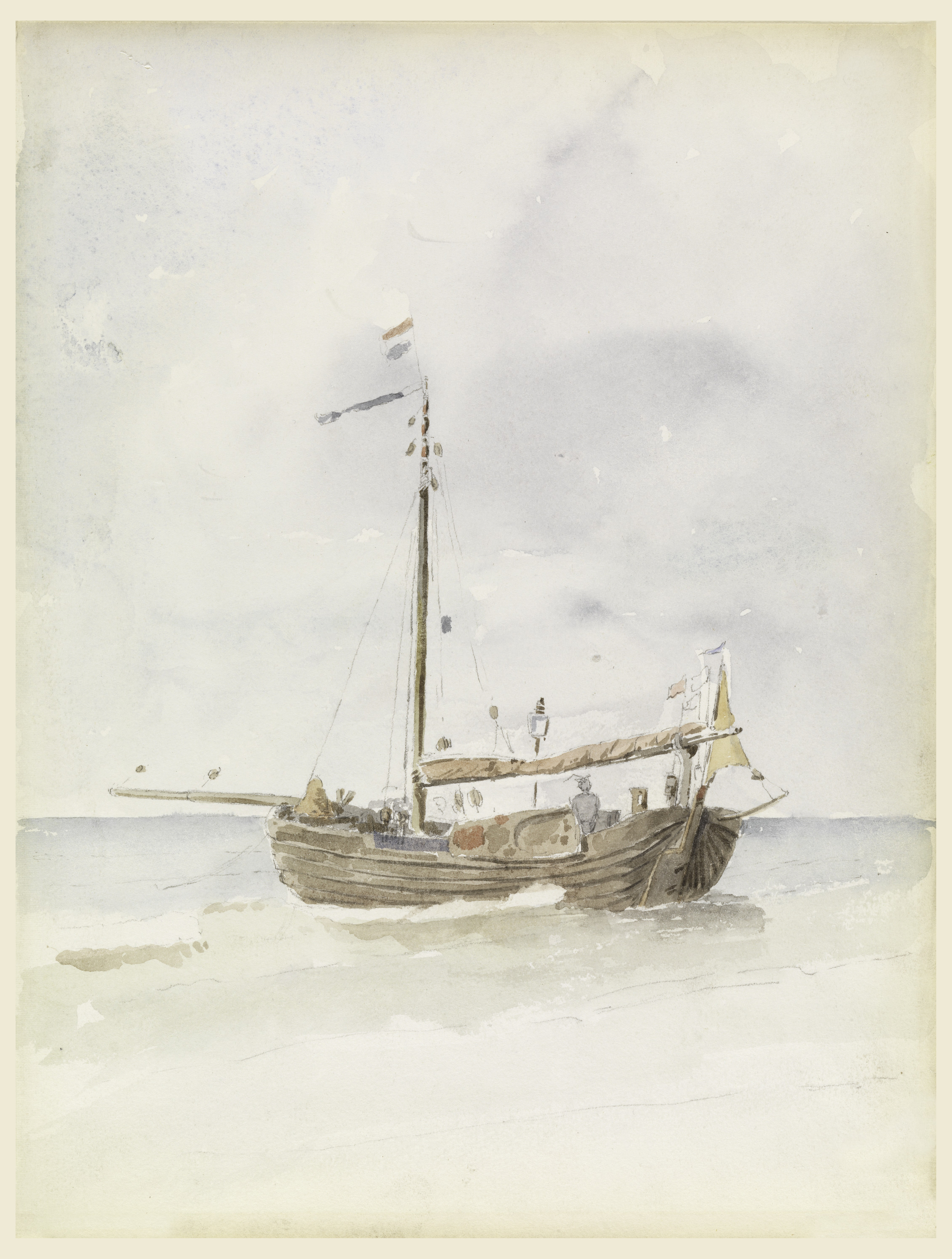
1887 watercolour of a Dutch Barge

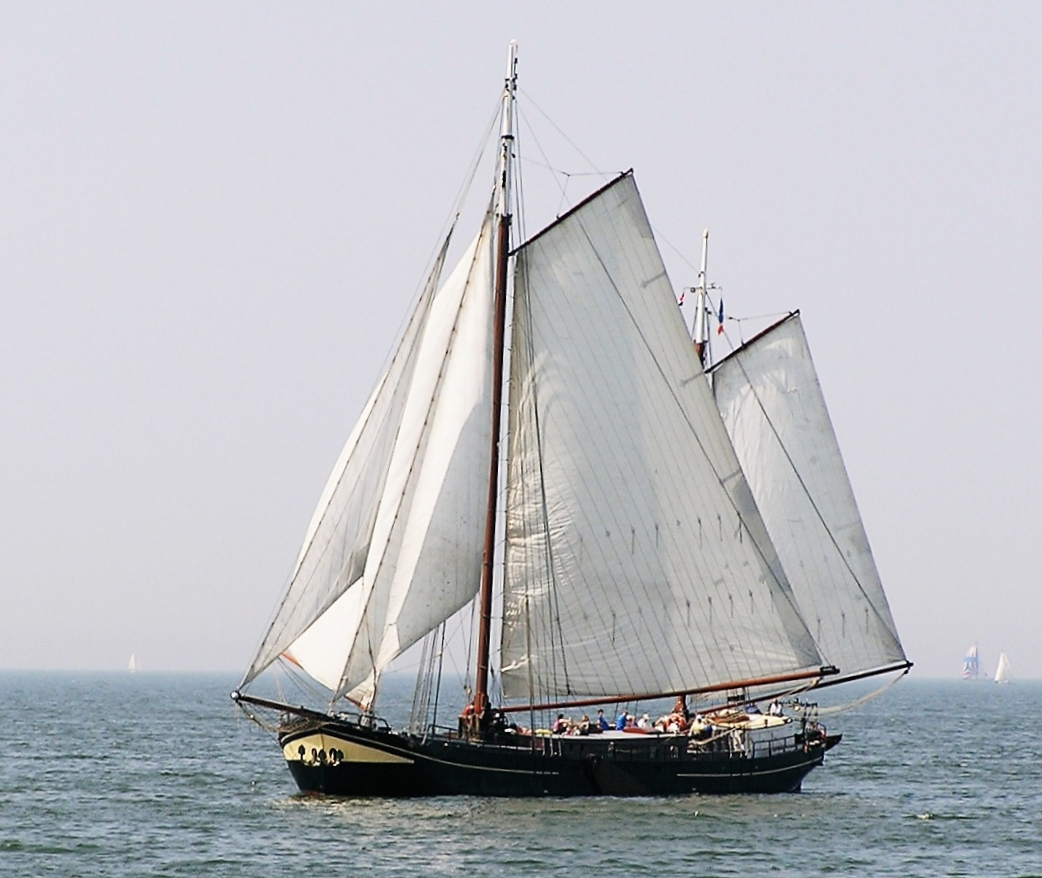
Traditional boat on the IJsselmeer

Dutch barge at Namur

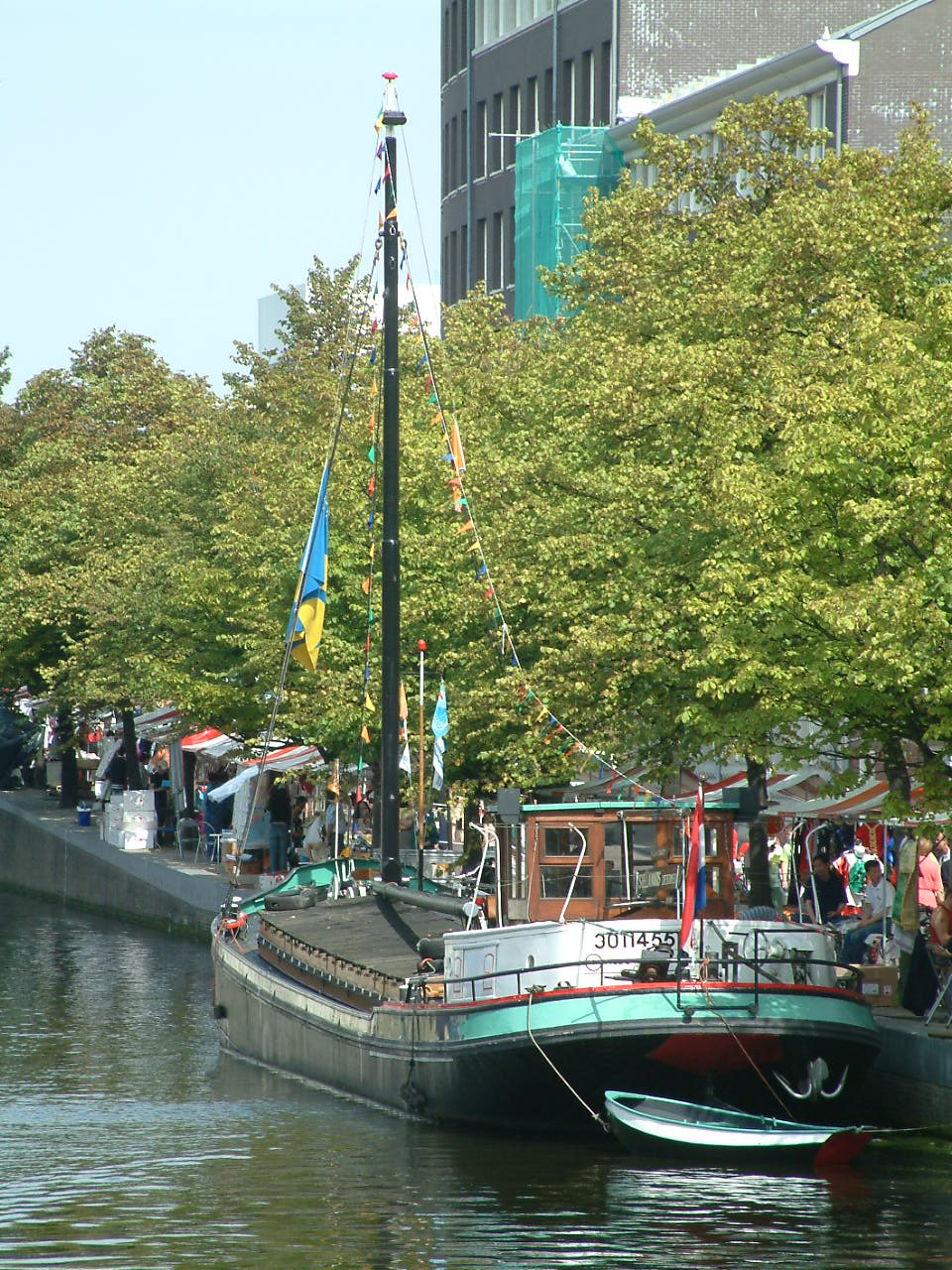
Luxe motor barge with characteristic "duck tail"

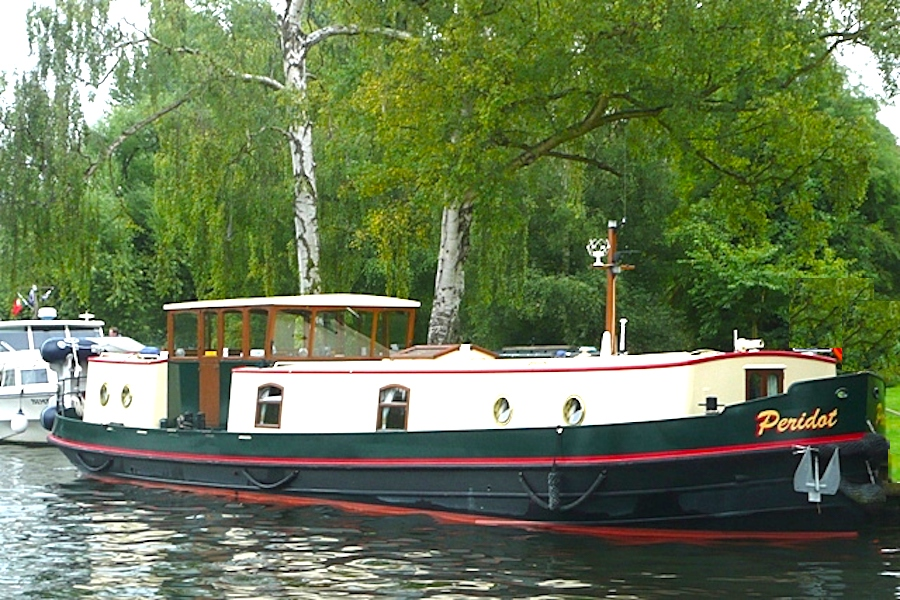
Piper barge at Windsor

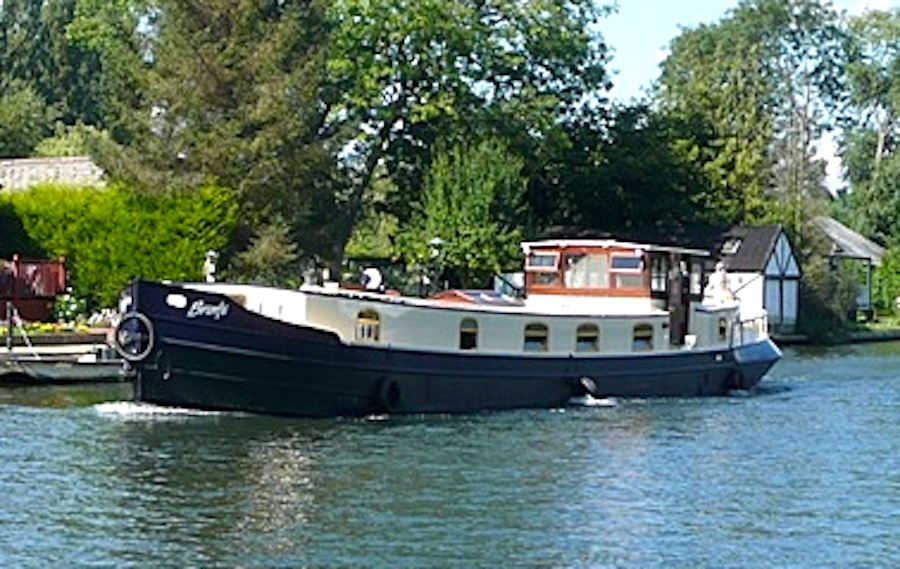
Dutch barge at Henley

== Dutch barge types ==
Jeffrey Casciani-Wood's "Glossary of Dutch Barge Terms" provides further details, as follows:

- Aak ("oak"): a barge having a rounded bow without a forestem;
- Beurtschip: A line ship for inland carriage of passengers and freight according to a regular schedule;
- Botter: a blunt-nosed Dutch barge;
- Dekschuit: any barge with an aft cabin below the aft deck;
- Hagenaar: an aak built to operate around The Hague, where waterways have dimensional restrictions;
- Katwijker: a barge from Katwijk, a district located on the North Sea, northwest of Leiden and 16 km north of The Hague;
- Klipper: an elegant barge with a clipper bow and a counter stern;
- Paviljoenschip: a barge whose standing-height aft cabin gives rise to a raised "pavilion" aft deck;
- Luxemotor: a paviljoen-type barge with a straight stem and a "duck tail' counter stern;
- Pram: a shallow-draught punt-like barge, propelled manually using a barge pole;
- Skûtsje: a skûtsje (pronounced 'skootscher') is a Frisian sailing boat similar to a tjalk;
- Schuyt: a Dutch barge;
- Steilsteven: a barge with an upright stem; ("steven" means "post");
- Tjalk: a "heavily-built" barge with an upright stem, originally tiller-steered;
- Westlander: a barge with a "distinctive pointed prow" and maximum dimensions of 17m x 3.2m.

=== The EU's Recreational Craft Directive ===
Since 1998 all new leisure boats and barges built in Europe between 2.5m and 24m LOA must comply with the EU's Recreational Craft Directive (RCD). The Directive establishes four categories that lay down the maximum allowable wind and wave conditions for vessels in each class:

== See also ==
- Canal mooring
- Lighter
- Narrowboat – a British canal boat able to enter a 7-foot wide (2.13 m) narrow lock
- Trekschuit
- Dutch barge "Hosanna"
- Dutch barge "Princess Matilda"
- Watercraft
- Widebeam, a barge styled as a narrowboat but with a beam of over 2.16 metres (7 ft 1 in).
