= Claud Worth =

British ophthalmologist and mariner

Claud Worth FRCS
- Born: 1869; Holbeach, Lincolnshire, England
- Died: 1936 (aged 66–67); Falmouth, Cornwall, England
- Known for: Ophthalmologist writer Master Mariner

Claud Alley Worth FRCS (1869–1936) was a British ophthalmologist, inventor of the Worth 4 dot test and Worth's Ambyloscope, a pioneer in the orthoptic treatment of squint, a master mariner and an established author on the subjects of ophthalmology and sailing.

== Early life ==
Claud Alley Worth was born in Holbeach, Lincolnshire in 1869, the son of Thomas Mordaunt Worth, scion of an ancient Lincolnshire family, and Frances Charlotte (née Alley). He was educated at Bedford Modern School, between 1884 and 1887, and St Bartholomew's Hospital. He qualified as MRCS and LRCP in 1893 and was elected FRCS in 1898.

== Career ==
Worth began the study of ophthalmology under Henry Power and Bowater Vernon at St Bartholomew's Hospital and in 1906 joined the staff of Moorfields. He was, for many years, ophthalmic surgeon to the West Ham Hospital in the East End of London.

Worth gained fame in two diverse areas of specialisation: the management of childhood squint and amblyopia, and the sailing and navigation of small yachts. His inventiveness endures, as demonstrated by Worth's 4 dot test and later versions of his original amblyoscope.

Worth's name and books were also familiar to sailors of small yachts. He was 'deeply knowledgeable about currents, harbours and all aspects of seamanship'. He was president of the Little Ship Club, Vice-Commodore of the Royal Cruising Club and a Master mariner.

== Personal life ==
Worth married Janet Duncan Ritchie in Sutton Bridge, Lincolnshire in 1906. He died in Falmouth, Cornwall, on 24 June 1936 and was survived by his wife and a son.

== Publications (selected) ==
- 1939: Worth's Squint; 7th ed. by F. Bernard Chavasse. Baillière & Co.
- 1950: Worth and Chavasse's Squint; 8th ed. by T. Keith Lyle. Baillière, Tindall & Cox
- 1959: Worth and Chavasse's Squint; 9th ed. by T. Keith Lyle and G. J. O. Bridgeman. Baillière, Tindall & Cox
