= Recreational Craft Directive =

The Recreational Craft Directive, Directive 2013/53/EU, originally Directive 94/25/EC on recreational craft amended by Directive 2003/44/EC, is a European Union directive which sets out minimum technical, safety and environmental standards for boats, personal watercraft, marine engines and components in Europe. It covers boats between 2.5 and 24m, personal watercraft, engines and a number of components built since 1998. It ensures their suitability for sale and use in Europe.

The 2013 Directive is usually referred to as RCD2 to differentiate it from the 1994 original.

== History ==
Directive 94/25/EC was the first piece of harmonised legislation in the EU to regulate the boating industry throughout Europe. It was brought in to harmonise the safety requirements related to the design and construction of boats across Europe. The Directive allowed for the creation and emergence of a single market for boats, personal watercraft, marine engines and components in the EU.

The Directive was revised in 2003 with the adoption of Directive 2003/44/EC. This amending directive brought personal watercraft within the scope of the Directive, as well as introducing new requirements for noise and low limits for exhaust emissions for marine engines.

Directive 94/25/EC on recreational craft, as amended by 2003/44/EC was revised in 2013. The European Commission's proposal brought the Directive in line with the New Legislative Framework, as well as bringing in stricter exhaust emissions limits and clarifying the concept of private importer. The proposal was published by the European Commission in July 2011 and was adopted in 2013 by the European Parliament and Council of the European Union.

== Content ==
Directive 94/25/EC, as amended by 2003/44/EC, applies to new and second hand recreational craft from 2.5m to 24m in length, personal watercraft, marine propulsion engines and components placed on the market for the first time after 1998. Products excluded from the scope of the Directive include: canoes, kayaks, gondolas, pedalos, sailing surfboards, surfboards, racing boats, historical craft, craft built for own use provided that they are not subsequently placed on the market during a period of five years, commercial vessels carrying passengers (covered by separate legislation), submersibles, air cushion vehicles, hydrofoils, and external combustion steam powered craft.

Products falling within the scope of the Directive must comply with the essential requirements set out in the Annex I. These include requirements for the design and construction of crafts such as boat design categories, craft identification, the owner's manual, as well as integrity, structural and installation requirements. Other requirements apply to the exhaust and noise emissions from propulsion engines. To comply with the essential requirements, over 60 EN-ISO harmonised standards were developed, which provide guidelines to meet the essential requirements. Using the EN-ISO harmonised standards is voluntary and provides presumption of conformity with the Directive's requirements. However, manufacturers may choose alternative solutions to comply with the essential requirements. Harmonised standards for Directive 94/25/EC are developed at international level by the International Organization for Standardization in the ISO Technical Committee 188 and CEN.

Products which fulfil the Directive's essential requirements must bear the CE marking of conformity. The CE marking must appear in a visible, legible and indelible form on the product or, in the case of small components, its packaging. Where relevant, it should be accompanied by the identification number of the Notified body that carried out the conformity assessment procedures. Notified bodies are appointed at the national level by EU Member States to carry out conformity assessments on boats and engines according to the requirements of the Directive. To assist in the uniform interpretation and application of the Directive, the Recreational Craft Sectoral Group was established in 1995.

In addition to the CE marking, the recreational craft must be accompanied by the following documentations and markings: the boat builder's plate; craft and engine identification number; owner's manual; and a written declaration of conformity. These items are necessary for the product to be considered as compliant with the requirements of the Directive.

Design categories (pre-2013)

Initially, the Directive established four categories that permit the allowable wind and wave conditions for vessels in each class:

- Class A - the boat may safely navigate any waters.
- Class B - the boat is limited to offshore navigation. (Winds up to Force 8 & waves up to 4 metres)
- Class C - the boat is limited to inshore (coastal) navigation. (Winds up to Force 6 & waves up to 2 metres)
- Class D - the boat is limited to rivers, canals and small lakes. (Winds up to Force 4 & waves up to 0.5 metres)

Changes from 2013

Since 18 January 2017, the latest version of the Recreational Craft Directive 2013/53/EU became applicable. The geographical description of the design categories has been removed (ocean, coast, etc.) in order to provide clearer information to consumers. Craft in each design category must be designed and constructed to withstand the parameters in respect of stability, buoyancy, and other relevant essential requirements listed in this Annex, and to have good handling characteristics.

The design categories are now defined as follows.

Design category	Wind force (Beaufort scale)	Significant wave height (H ⅓, metres)
A	exceeding 8	exceeding 4
B	up to, and including, 8	up to, and including, 4
C	up to, and including, 6	up to, and including, 2
D	up to, and including, 4	up to, and including, 0,3

In addition, a number of explanatory notes further clarify the design categories:

1. A recreational craft given design category A is considered to be designed for winds that may exceed wind force 8 (Beaufort scale) and significant wave height of 4 m and above but excluding abnormal conditions, such as storm, violent storm, hurricane, tornado and extreme sea conditions or rogue waves.
2. A recreational craft given design category B is considered to be designed for a wind force up to, and including, 8 and significant wave height up to, and including, 4 m.
3. A watercraft given design category C is considered to be designed for a wind force up to, and including, 6 and significant wave height up to, and including, 2 m.
4. A watercraft given design category D is considered to be designed for a wind force up to, and including, 4 and significant wave height up to, and including, 0,3 m, with occasional waves of 0,5 m maximum height.

The Craft Identification Number CIN (previously HIN) has been replaced by Watercraft Identification Number WIN, the Manufacturer Identification Code MIC must now be registered in a member state. On the Builder's plate, in place of the manufacturer's name, the RCD II now requires manufacturer's name, registered trade name or registered trademark, as well as contact address (note: a website is acceptable). The new directive also requires the means of re-boarding to be: accessible to or deployable by a person in the water unaided. Sailing yachts now need to comply with visibility for helmsman requirements. Means of escape in the event of inversion is now only required for multihull susceptible to inversion. Toilets must now have a holding tank; they can not be discharged directly overboard but must pass through the holding tank. Manufacturers need to ensure that the propulsion engines are now complying with RCD II.

== CE design category ==
CE design category is the classification system used in the European Union to indicate the environmental conditions for which a recreational craft or personal watercraft is designed under Directive 2013/53/EU. The system forms part of the EU regime for recreational craft and personal watercraft and is shown on the craft's builder's plate together with the CE marking. The categories are defined in terms of wind force and significant wave height rather than by geographic labels. Recital 33 of Directive 2013/53/EU states that the titles of the watercraft design categories should be based only on the essential environmental conditions for navigation, namely wind force and significant wave height, to provide clear information about the acceptable operating environment of watercraft.

The CE design category system is laid down in Annex I, Part A, point 1 of Directive 2013/53/EU. The directive applies to recreational craft and personal watercraft with a hull length from 2.5 metres to 24 metres, subject to specified exclusions. The directive replaced the earlier framework established by Directive 94/25/EC, as amended by Directive 2003/44/EC. According to the European Commission, Directive 2013/53/EU has applied since 18 January 2016. Categories

Directive 2013/53/EU defines four design categories, designated A, B, C and D. Watercraft in each category must be designed and constructed to withstand the relevant parameters respecting stability, buoyancy and other applicable essential requirements, and to have good handling characteristics.

CE design categories under Directive 2013/53/EU
Category	Wind force (Beaufort scale)	Significant wave height (H_{1/3}, metres)	Definition in the directive
A	Exceeding 8	Exceeding 4	Watercraft designed for extended voyages where conditions may exceed wind force 8 and significant wave heights of 4 m and above, but excluding abnormal conditions such as storm, violent storm, hurricane, tornado and extreme sea conditions or rogue waves.
B	Up to and including 8	Up to and including 4	Watercraft designed for offshore voyages where conditions up to and including wind force 8 and significant wave heights up to and including 4 m may be experienced.
C	Up to and including 6	Up to and including 2	Watercraft designed for voyages in coastal waters, large bays, estuaries, lakes and rivers where conditions up to and including wind force 6 and significant wave heights up to and including 2 m may be experienced.
D	Up to and including 4	Up to and including 0.3	Watercraft designed for voyages in sheltered coastal waters, small bays, small lakes, rivers and canals where conditions up to and including wind force 4 and significant wave heights up to and including 0.3 m may be experienced, with occasional waves of 0.5 m maximum height caused for example by passing vessels.

Under the directive, the design category is a design classification and not a navigational authorisation. The European Commission's application guide explains that the categories are linked to the essential environmental conditions for navigation and to the technical assessment of the craft under the directive. The guide also notes that the upper limits for category A are defined implicitly, since the directive excludes abnormal conditions such as storms, hurricanes, tornadoes and rogue waves rather than setting a fixed upper numerical limit for that category. The term significant wave height is used in the directive as the relevant wave parameter for classification. In its 2022 report on the evaluation and review of Directive 2013/53/EU, the European Commission described the upper limits for category A as being set implicitly by the exclusion of stormy weather and referred to the design categories as one of the directive's key technical elements.

Directive 2013/53/EU requires the builder's plate of a watercraft to include the craft design category. The builder's plate must be affixed separately from the watercraft identification number and must be visible, legible and indelible. The design category is one of the principal items of information communicated to buyers and users of recreational craft within the EU conformity framework. The European Commission states that the directive is intended to ensure a high level of protection of health, safety, the environment and consumers while guaranteeing the functioning of the internal market.
