= Montech Canal =

Canal in southwestern France

Coordinates: 43°57′47″N 1°14′10″E

Canal de Montech
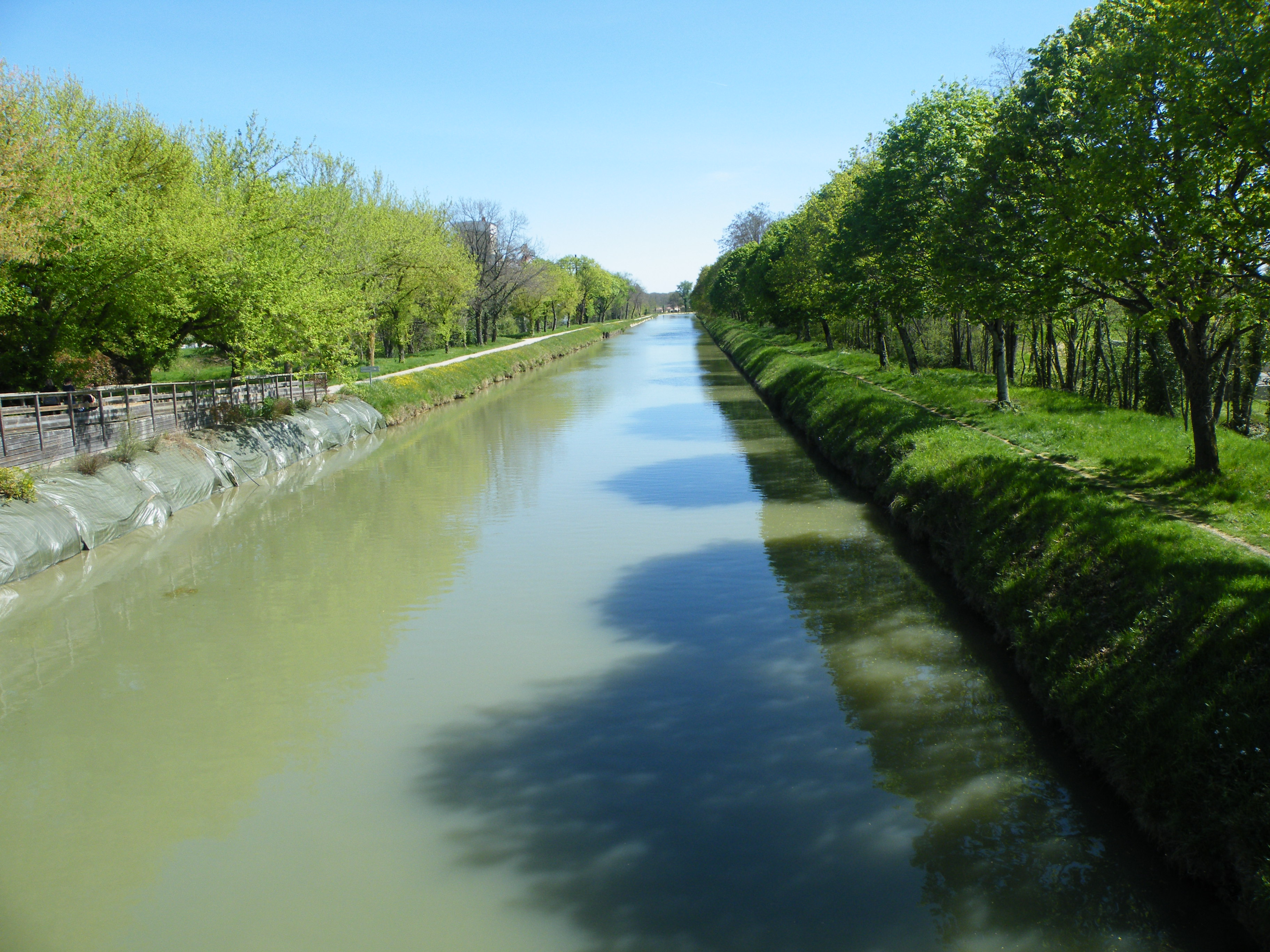
- Interactive map of Canal de Montech

Specifications
- Length: 11 km (6.8 mi)
- Locks: 11

History
- Date of first use: 1843

Geography
- Start point: Canal de Garonne in Montech
- End point: Tarn in Montauban

The Canal de Montech (French pronunciation: [kanal də mɔ̃tɛʃ]) is an 11 km waterway in southwestern France connecting the Canal de Garonne in Montech and the Tarn River in Montauban. It is also known as the Montauban Branch (French: l’embranchement de Montauban).

A lock at Moissac also connects the Canal de Garonne to a lower section of the Tarn. A proposal exists to create a waterway ring, including the Canal de Montech, by restoring navigation to the stretch of the Tarn between Moissac and Montauban.

== Port Canal in Montauban ==
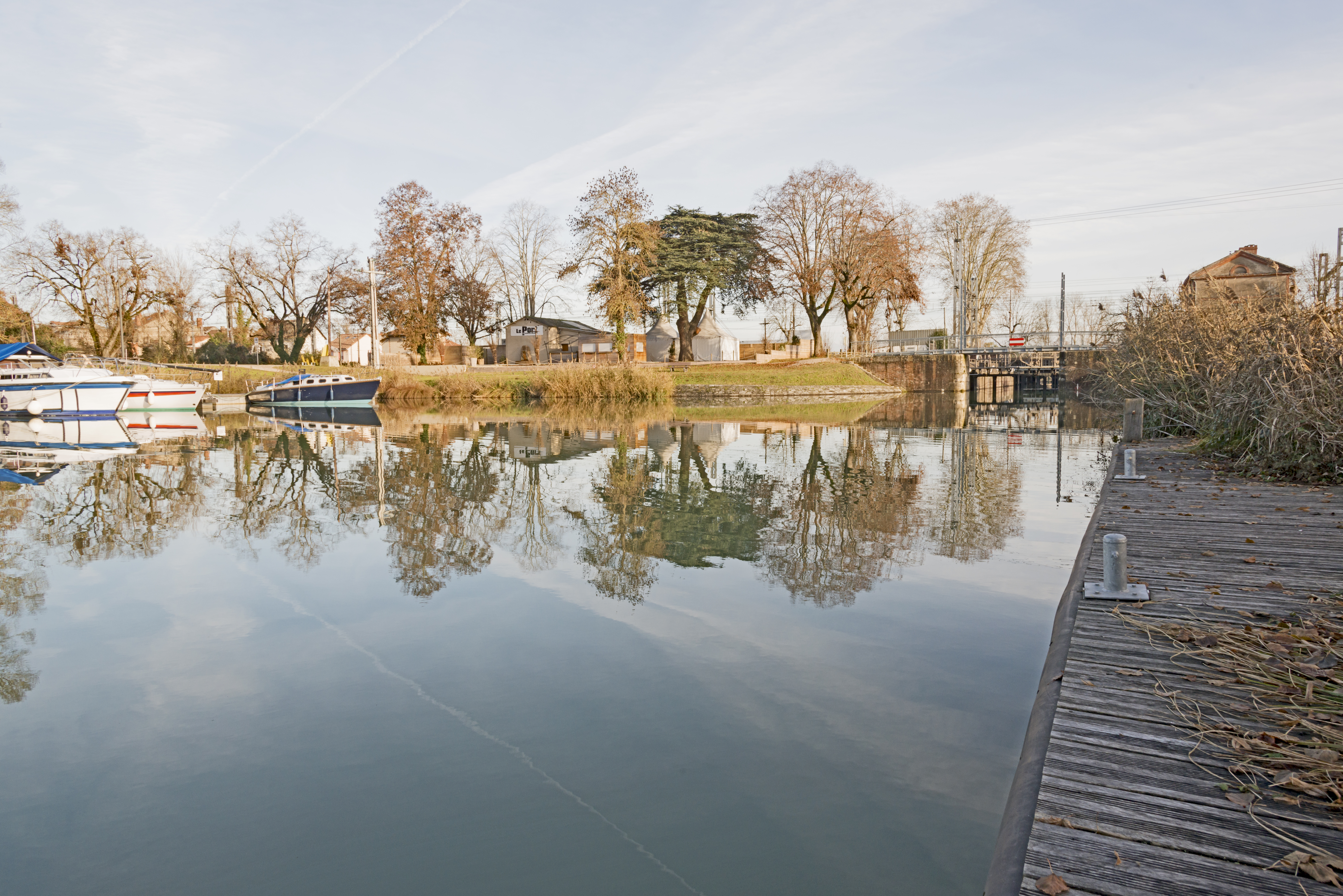
The lock to the Tarn.

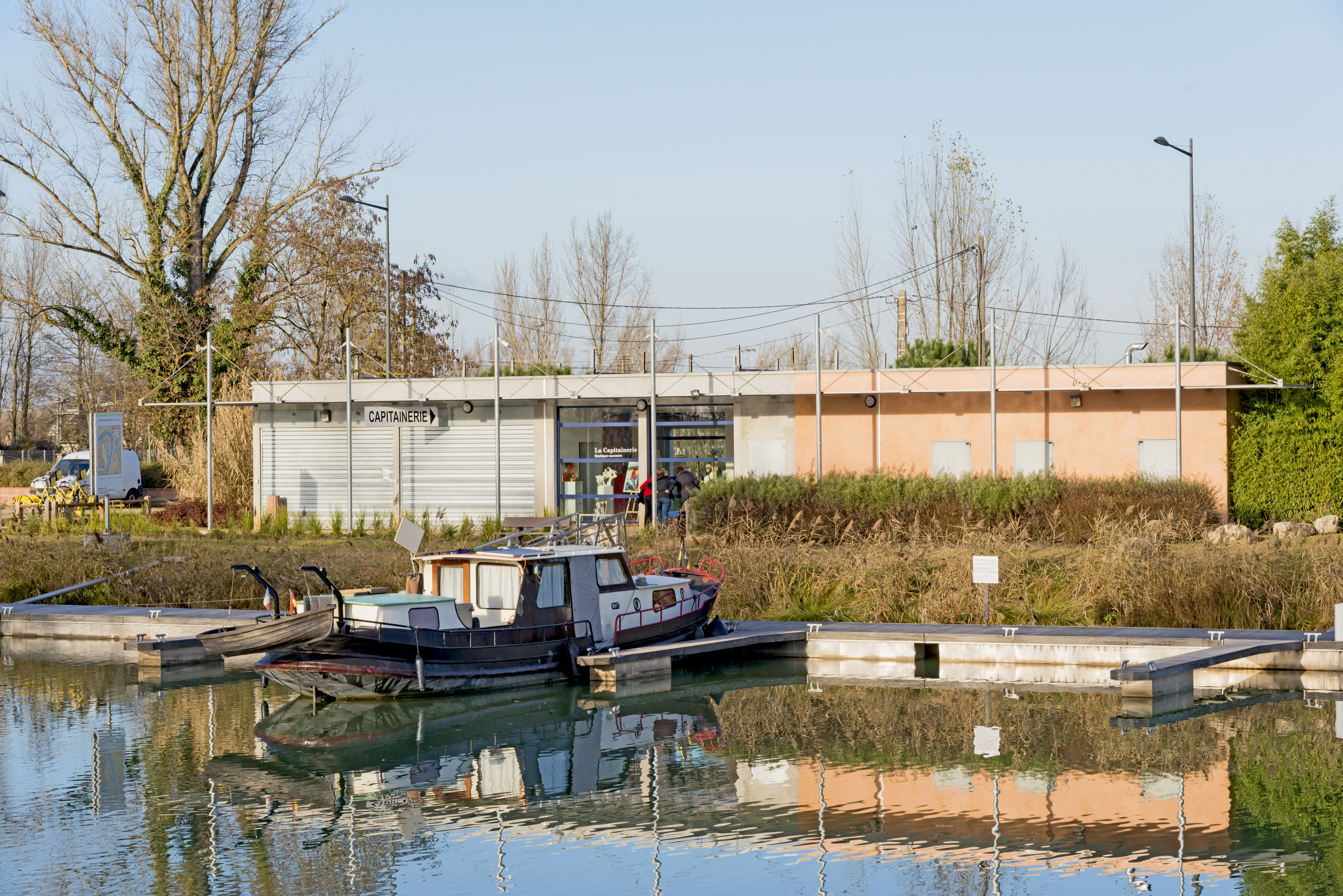
Captaincy

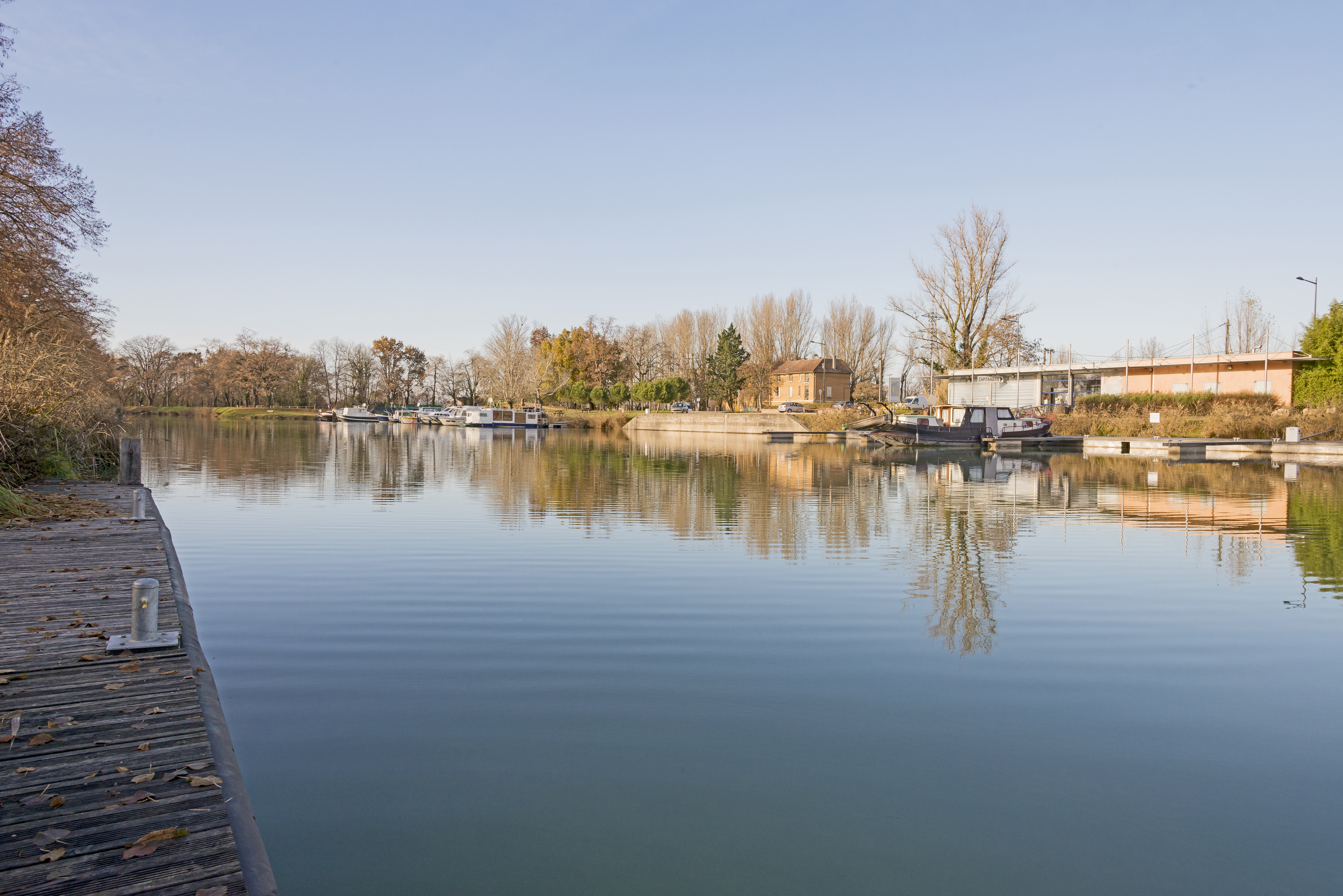
'Port Canal' in Montauban

== See also ==
- List of canals in France
