= Puybarban =

- Commune
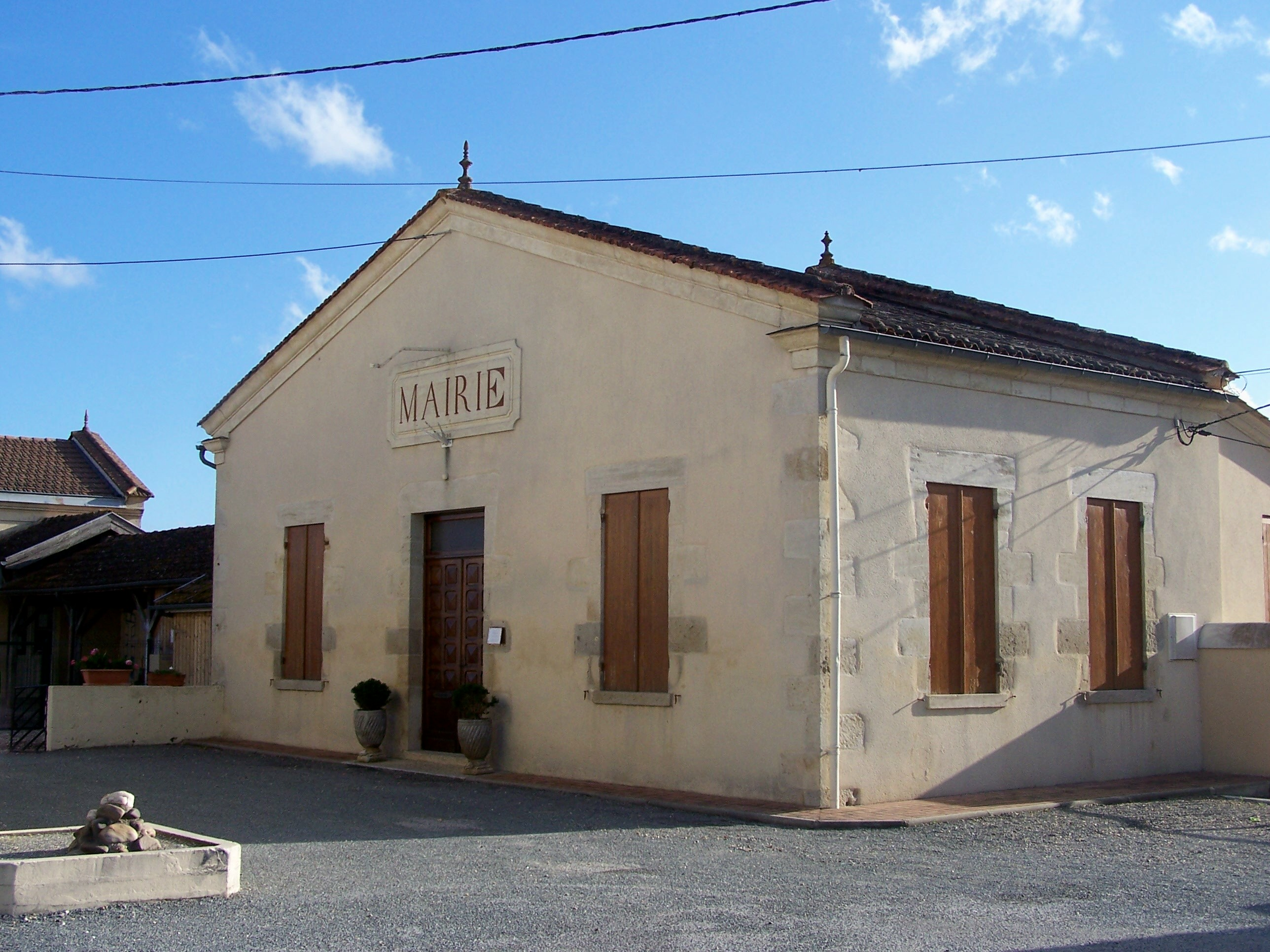
- Town hall
- Location of Puybarban
- Location within France Location within Nouvelle-Aquitaine
- Coordinates: 44°33′13″N 0°04′25″W
- Country: France
- Region: Nouvelle-Aquitaine
- Department: Gironde
- Arrondissement: Langon
- Canton: Le Réolais et Les Bastides

Government
  - Mayor (2020–2026): Dominique Turbet Delof
- Area^{1}: 5.58 km^{2} (2.15 sq mi)
- Highest elevation: 65 m (213 ft)
- Lowest elevation: 12 m (39 ft)
- Population (2023): 407
  - Density: 72.9/km^{2} (189/sq mi)
- Time zone: UTC+01:00 (CET)
  - Summer (DST): UTC+02:00 (CEST)
- INSEE/Postal code: 33346 /33190
- ^{1} French Land Register data, which excludes lakes, ponds, glaciers > 1 km^{2} (0.386 sq mi or 247 acres) and river estuaries.

Puybarban (French pronunciation: [pɥibaʁbɑ̃]; Occitan: Pugbarban) is a commune in the Gironde department in Nouvelle-Aquitaine in southwestern France.

== Geography ==
The commune of Puybarban is located south (left bank) of the Garonne, but does not border it, being separated from the river by the commune of Floudès. It is 60 km southeast of Bordeaux, the departmental capital, 16 km east of Langon, the arrondissement capital, and 9 km northeast of Auros, the former cantonal capital.

The neighbouring communes are Floudès to the north, Blaignac to the east, Loupiac-de-la-Réole to the extreme southeast for about 700 m, Pondaurat to the south and west and Bassanne to the northwest.

=== Climate ===
Several studies have been conducted to characterize the climatic types to which the national territory is exposed. The resulting zoning varies depending on the methods used, the nature and number of parameters considered, the territorial coverage of the data, and the reference period. In 2010, the commune's climate was classified as an altered oceanic climate, according to a study by the French National Centre for Scientific Research (CNRS) based on a method combining climatic data and environmental factors (topography, land use, etc.) and data covering the period 1971-2000. In 2020, the predominant climate was classified as Cfa, according to the Köppen-Geiger classification, for the period 1988-2017, namely a temperate climate with hot summers and no dry season. Furthermore, in 2020, Météo-France published a new climate typology for metropolitan France, in which the town is exposed to an oceanic climate and is located in the Aquitaine-Gascogne climate region. This region is characterized by abundant rainfall in spring, moderate rainfall in autumn, low sunshine in spring, hot summers (19.5 °C), light winds, frequent fog in autumn and winter, and frequent thunderstorms in summer (15 to 20 days). It is also located in zone H2c under the 2020 environmental regulations for new construction.

For the period 1971-2000, the average annual temperature was 12.9 °C, with an annual temperature range of 15 °C. The average annual rainfall was 803 mm, with 11.2 days of precipitation in January and 6.5 days in July. For the period 1991-2020, the average annual temperature observed at the nearest Météo-France weather station, located in the commune of Saint-Sulpice-de-Pommiers 14 km away as the crow flies, was 13.8 °C, and the average annual rainfall was 764.8 mm. The maximum temperature recorded at this station was 41.6 °C, reached on 11 August 2025; the minimum temperature was −12.1 °C, reached on 9 February 2012.

== Urban planning ==
=== Typology ===
As of 1 January 2024, Puybarban is categorized as a rural commune with dispersed housing, according to the new seven-level municipal population density scale defined by INSEE in 2022. It is located outside an urban area. Furthermore, the commune is part of the La Réole catchment area, of which it is a peripheral commune. This area, which includes communes, is categorized as having fewer than 50,000 inhabitants.

=== Land use ===
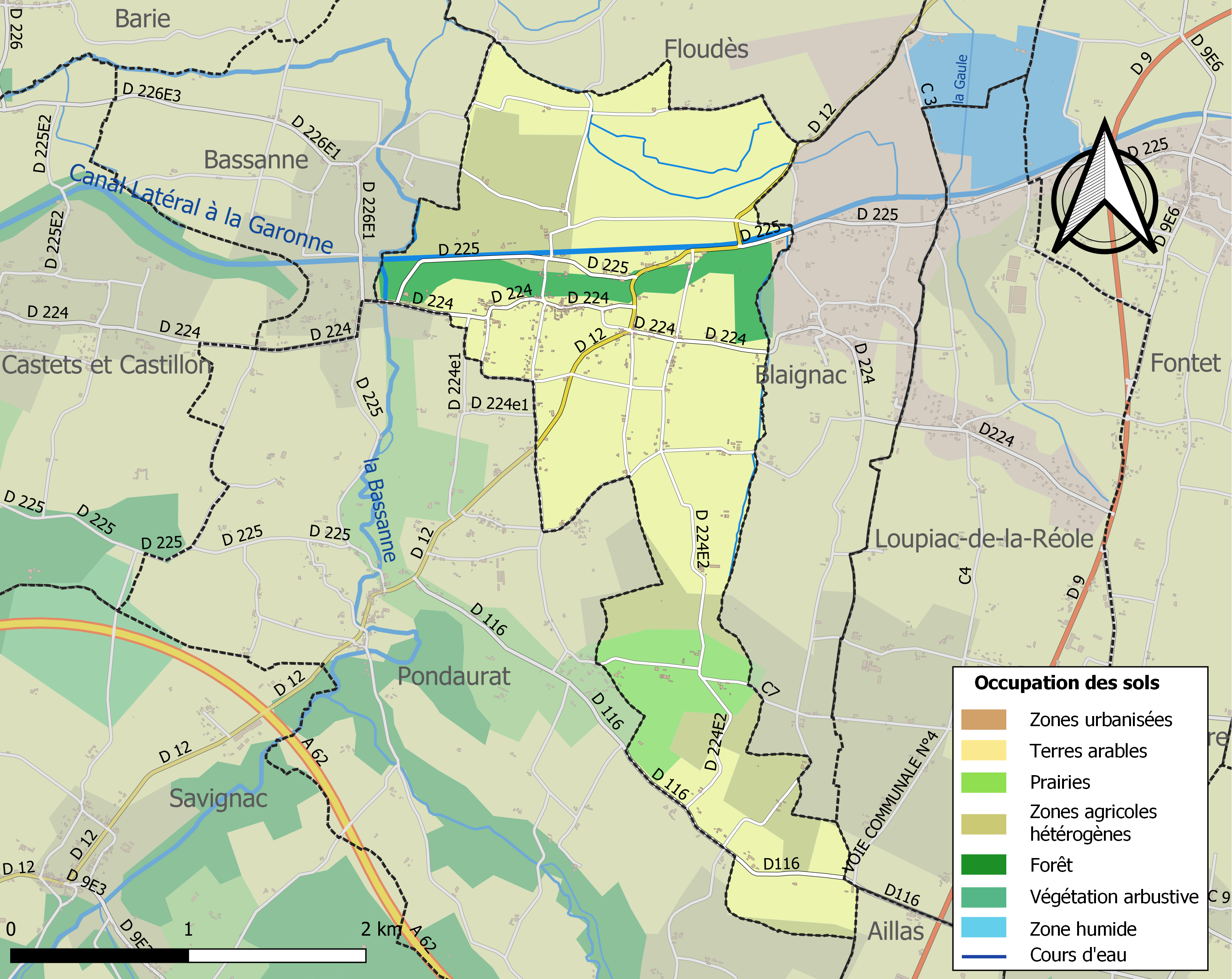
Map of land use and infrastructure in Puybarban

Land cover in the commune, as shown in the European biophysical land cover database Corine Land Cover (CLC), is characterized by a significant amount of agricultural land (92.6% in 2018), a proportion roughly equivalent to that of 1990 (92.8%). The detailed breakdown in 2018 is as follows: arable land (65.2%), heterogeneous agricultural areas (20%), grasslands (7.4%), forests (7.2%), and urbanized areas (0.2%). Changes in land cover and infrastructure within the municipality can be observed on various maps of the territory: the Cassini map (18th century), the General Staff map (1820-1866), and IGN maps and aerial photographs for the current period (1950 to the present).

=== Communication routes and transport ===
The town is crossed by the D12 departmental road, which connects La Réole in the northeast to Auros in the southwest, and by the D224 departmental road, which leads west to Castets-et-Castillon and beyond towards Langon, and east to Blaignac, Loupiac-de-la-Réole, and the D9 departmental road (La Réole to the north and Aillas to the south).

The nearest motorway is the A62 (Bordeaux-Toulouse), whose exit no. 4, known as La Réole, is 6 km away by road to the southeast.

Exit no. 1, known as Bazas, to the A65 (Langon-Pau) motorway is 21 km away to the southwest.

The nearest SNCF train station is La Réole, 5.5 km northeast by road, on the Bordeaux-Sète line of the TER Nouvelle-Aquitaine regional express train.

The Garonne Canal runs through the town from east to west.

=== Major risks ===
The territory of the commune of Puybarban is vulnerable to various natural hazards: weather-related events (storms, thunderstorms, snow, extreme cold, heat waves, or droughts), flooding, and earthquakes (very low seismicity). A website published by the BRGM (French Geological Survey) allows for a simple and quick assessment of the risks to a property located either by its address or by its plot number.

Certain parts of the municipal territory are susceptible to flooding from overflowing waterways, particularly the Garonne Lateral Canal and the Bassanne River. Puybarban has been declared a natural disaster area due to damage caused by floods and mudslides that occurred in 1982, 1992, 1999, 2009, and 2021.

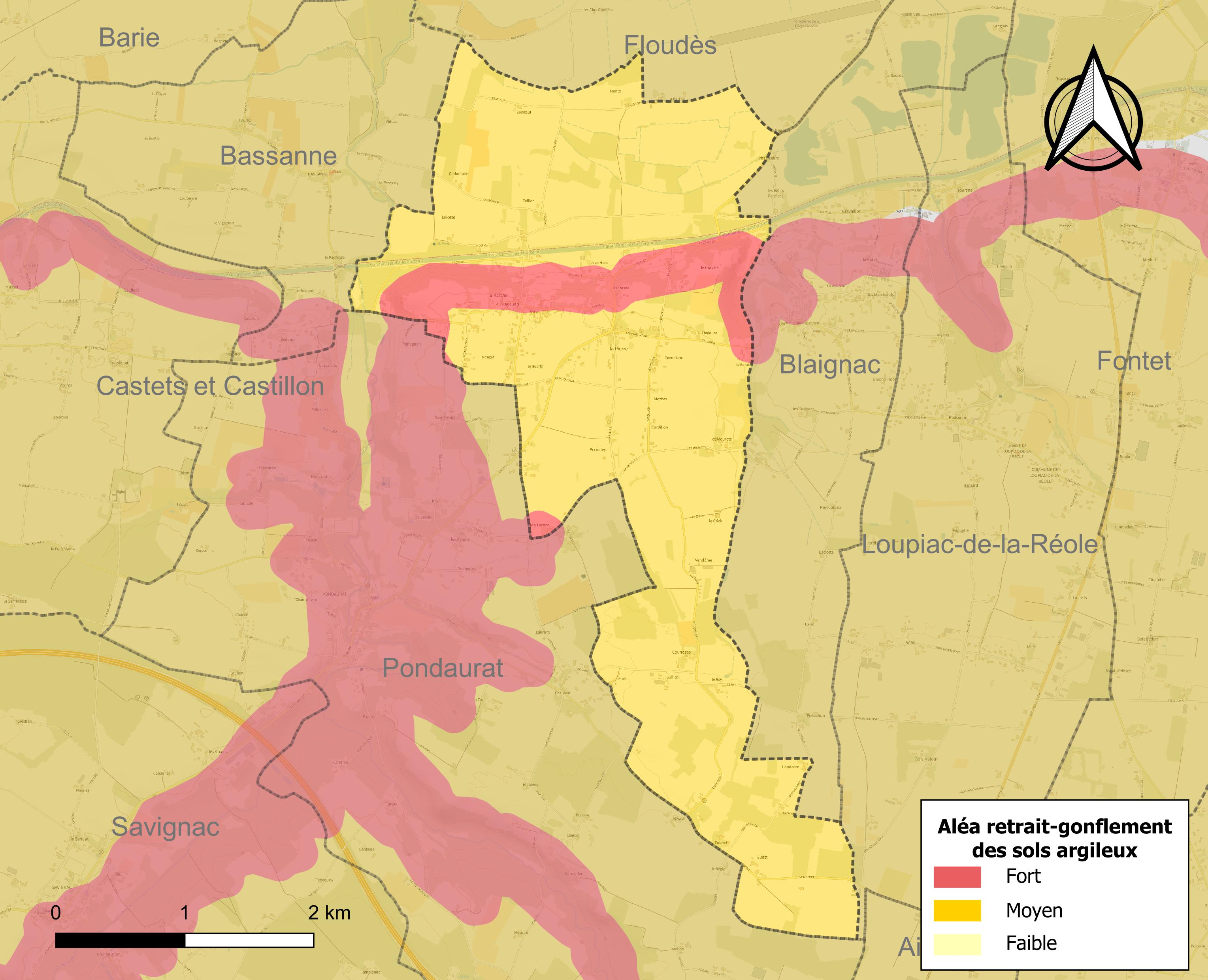
Map of the shrink-swell hazard zones of clay soils in Puybarban.

The shrinkage and swelling of clay soils can cause significant damage to buildings in the event of alternating periods of drought and rain. The entire Puybarban is at medium or high risk (67.4% at the departmental level and 48.5% at the national level). Of the 183 buildings counted in the commune in 2019, all 183 were at medium or high risk, representing 100%, compared to 84% at the departmental level and 54% at the national level. A map of the national territory's exposure to clay soil shrinkage and swelling is available on the BRGM website.

Furthermore, to better understand the risk of ground subsidence, the national inventory of underground cavities allows for the location of those within the commune.

Regarding landslides, the commune was recognized as a natural disaster area due to damage caused by drought in 2015 and by landslides in 1999.

== Name ==
The first element of the name Puybarban is puy, a Frenchified version of the Gascon word pug, meaning "hill, eminence" (palatalized pronunciation). The village is indeed situated on the edge of an alluvial terrace approximately 50–54 meters high, overlooking the Garonne's floodplain (12–14 meters above sea level). The second element is a name of Germanic origin, Barban.

In Gascon, the name of the commune is Pugbarban, pronounced [pytbar'ban].

Its inhabitants are called Puybarbanais.

== History ==
Gallo-Roman remains have been unearthed on this site, suggesting the existence of a Roman villa. The Château de Puybarban, incorporating the remains of a fortified castle, was for a long time the seigneury of the Piis (or Pins, or Pinos) family. The last of these, seneschal of the Bazadais region, was guillotined in 1794, despite believing he would be left in peace, as he claimed to be apolitical.

During the French Revolution, the parish of Saint-Michel de Puybarban became the commune of Puybarban.

During the World War II, Puybarban was captured by Nazi Germany.

== Culture and sights ==
- Saint-Michel church is a Romanesque church with a simple apse, remodeled in the 14th and 16th centuries, whose square bell tower has a slate-covered spire, the 14th-century cross of which was placed on the 17th-century spire.
  - It houses a bronze bell from the late 16th century which was classified as a historical monument in 1942.
- Remains of the fortified castle of Piis and 18th-century folly,
- Old houses in the village (mullioned windows...),
- Noble house of Barail and dovecote (17th century) with dripstone,
- Numerous Bazadaise farms with integrated barns and stables,
- Tobacco drying sheds whitewashed with bitumen.
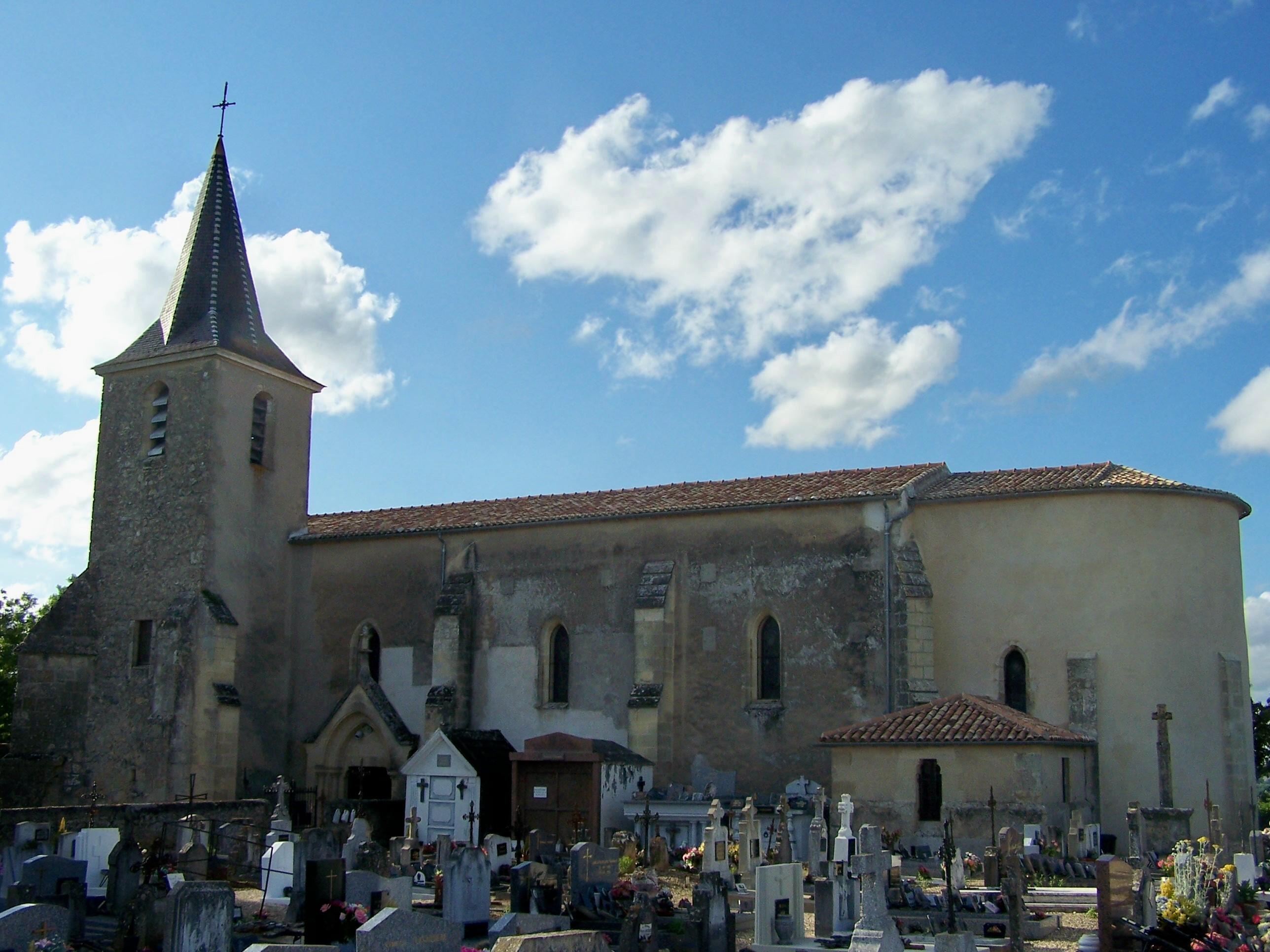
Saint Michael's Church

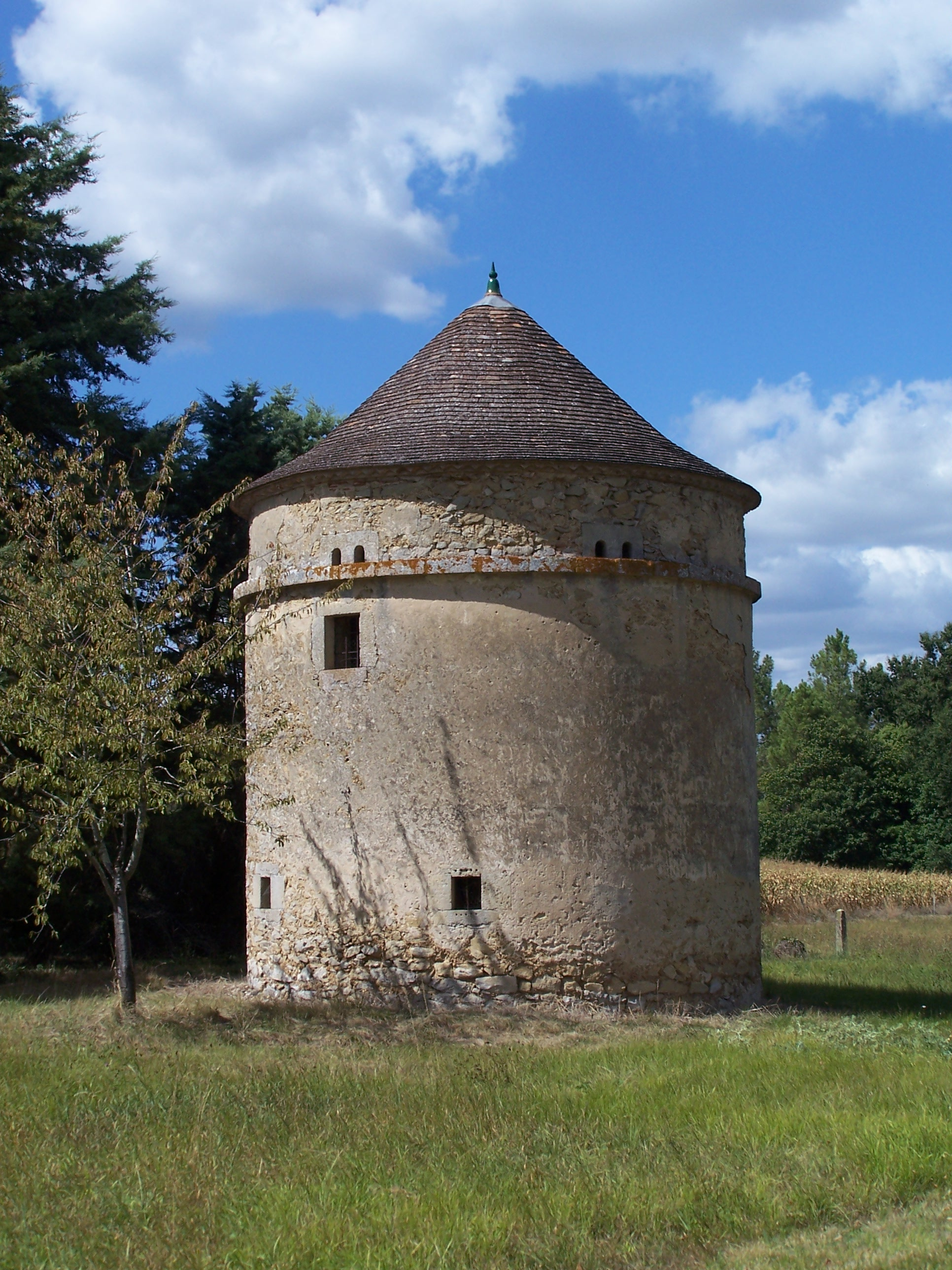
The dripstone dovecote of the Château du Barail

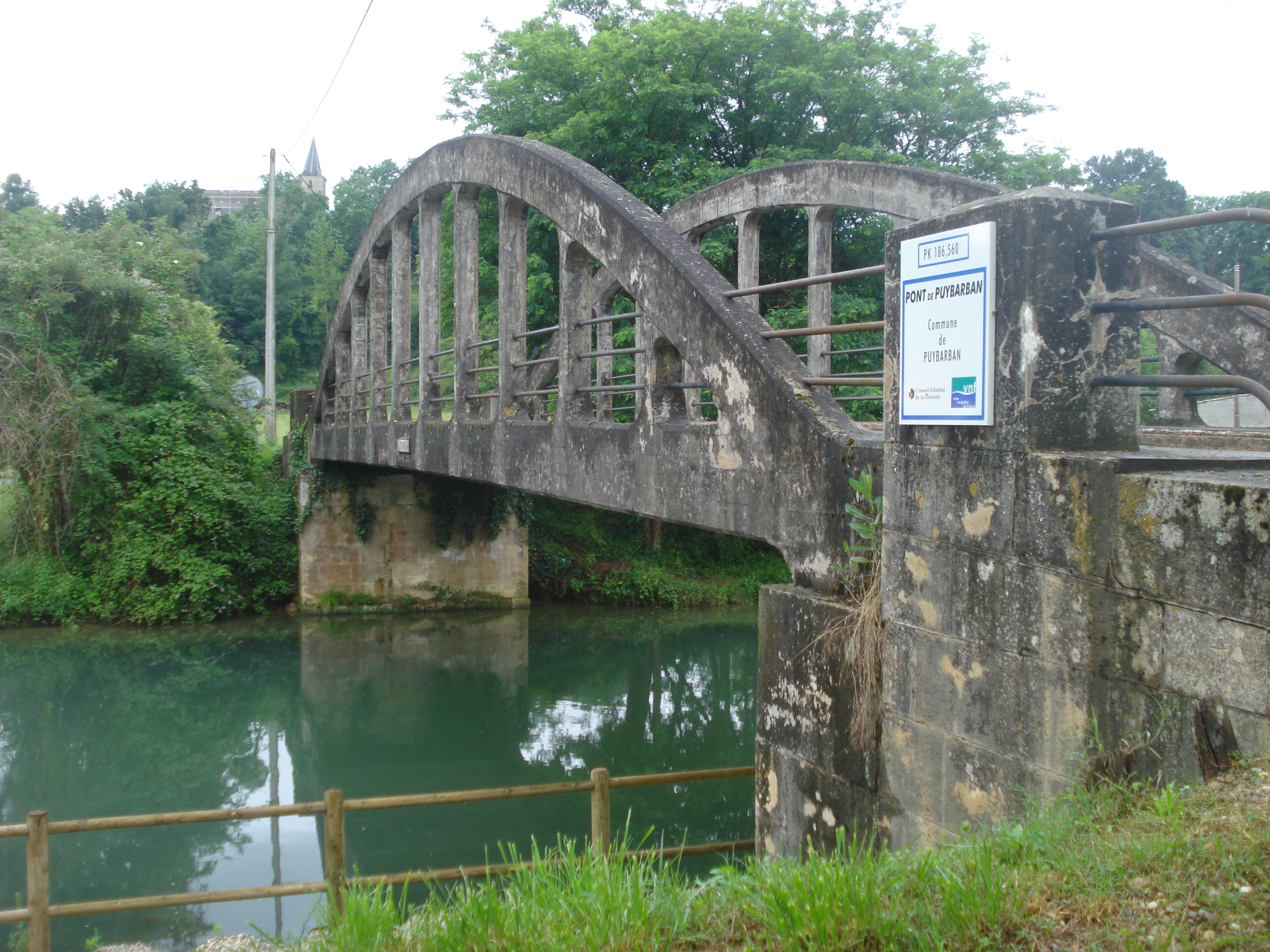
Puybarban Bridge, on the Garonne Canal

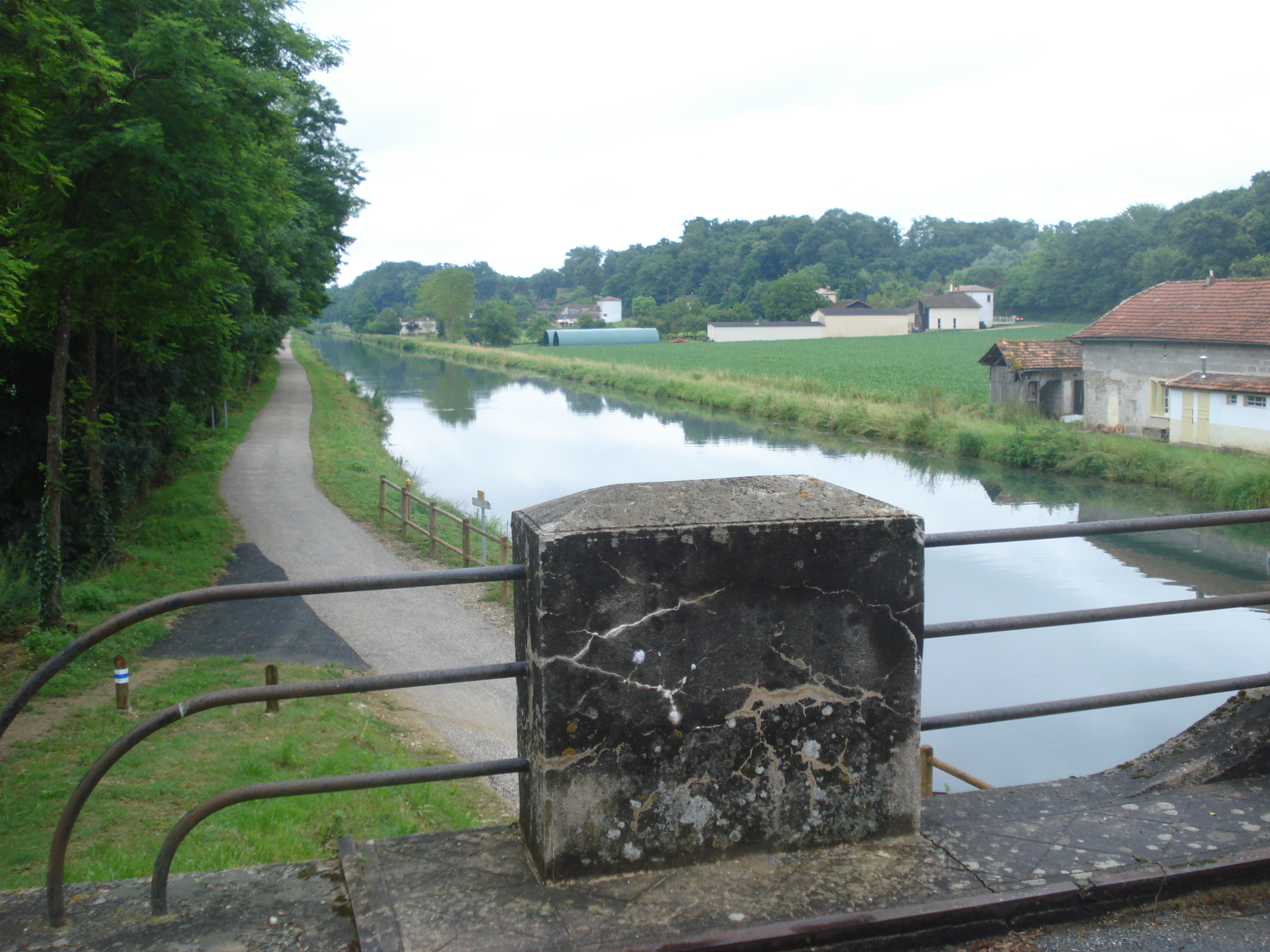
Garonne Canal at Puybarban

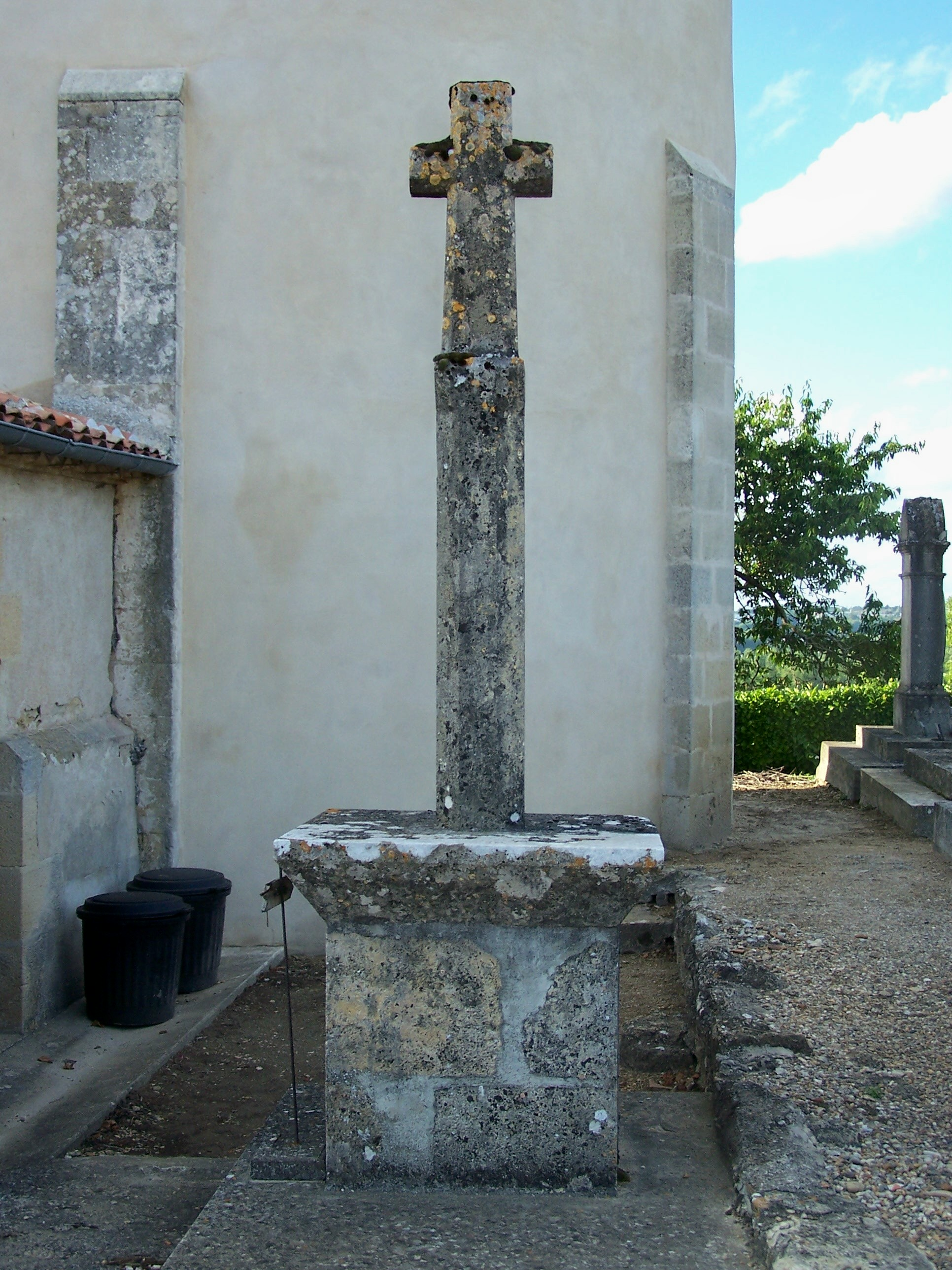
Monumental cross in the cemetery

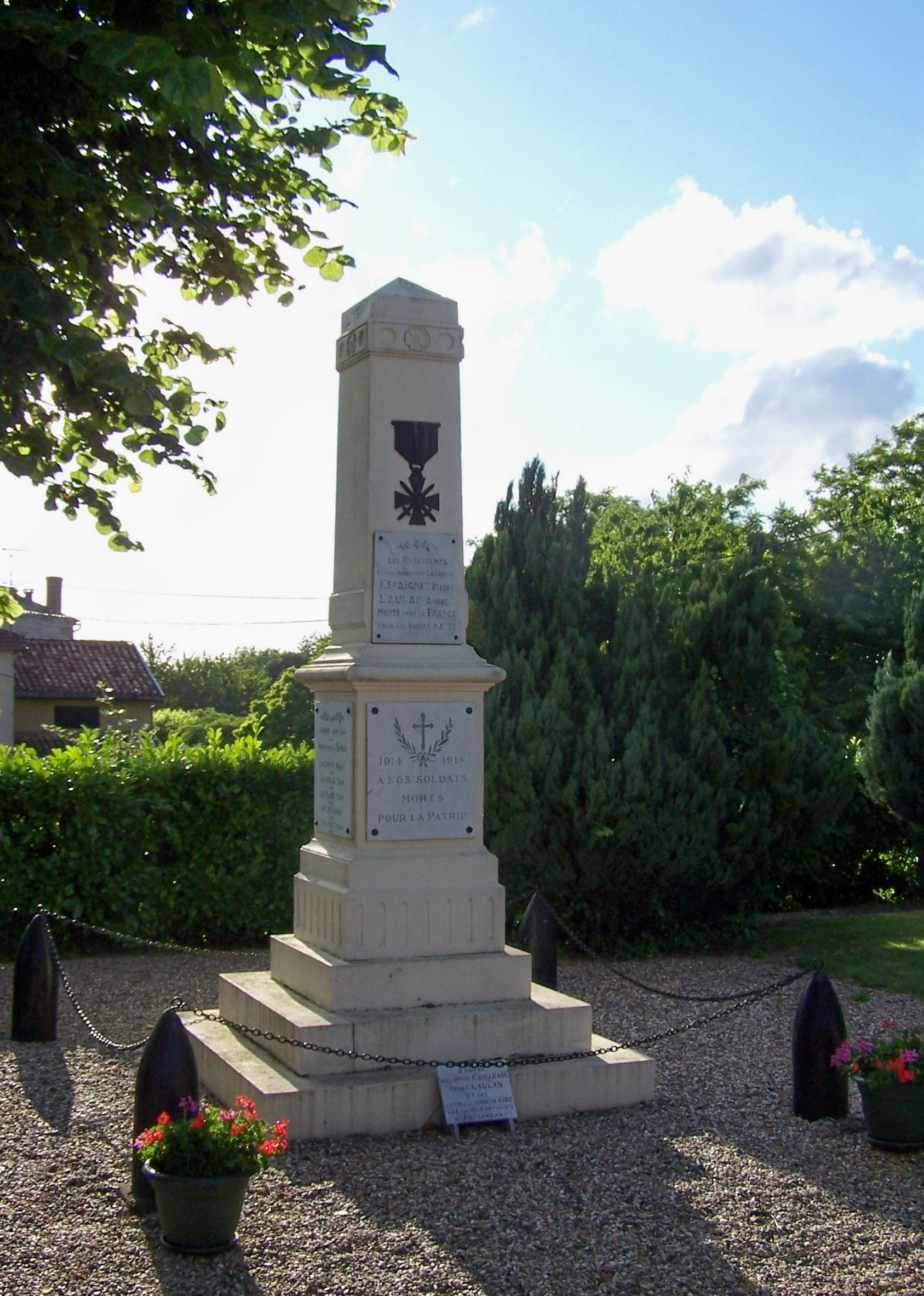
The war memorial in front of the church

== Population ==
Historical population
Year	Pop.	±% p.a.
1968	390	—
1975	339	−1.98%
1982	325	−0.60%
1990	330	+0.19%
1999	309	−0.73%
2007	424	+4.03%
2012	411	−0.62%
2017	423	+0.58%
2023	407	−0.64%
Source: INSEE

== See also ==
- Communes of the Gironde department
