= Garonne Canal =

Canal in France

Canal latéral à la Garonne
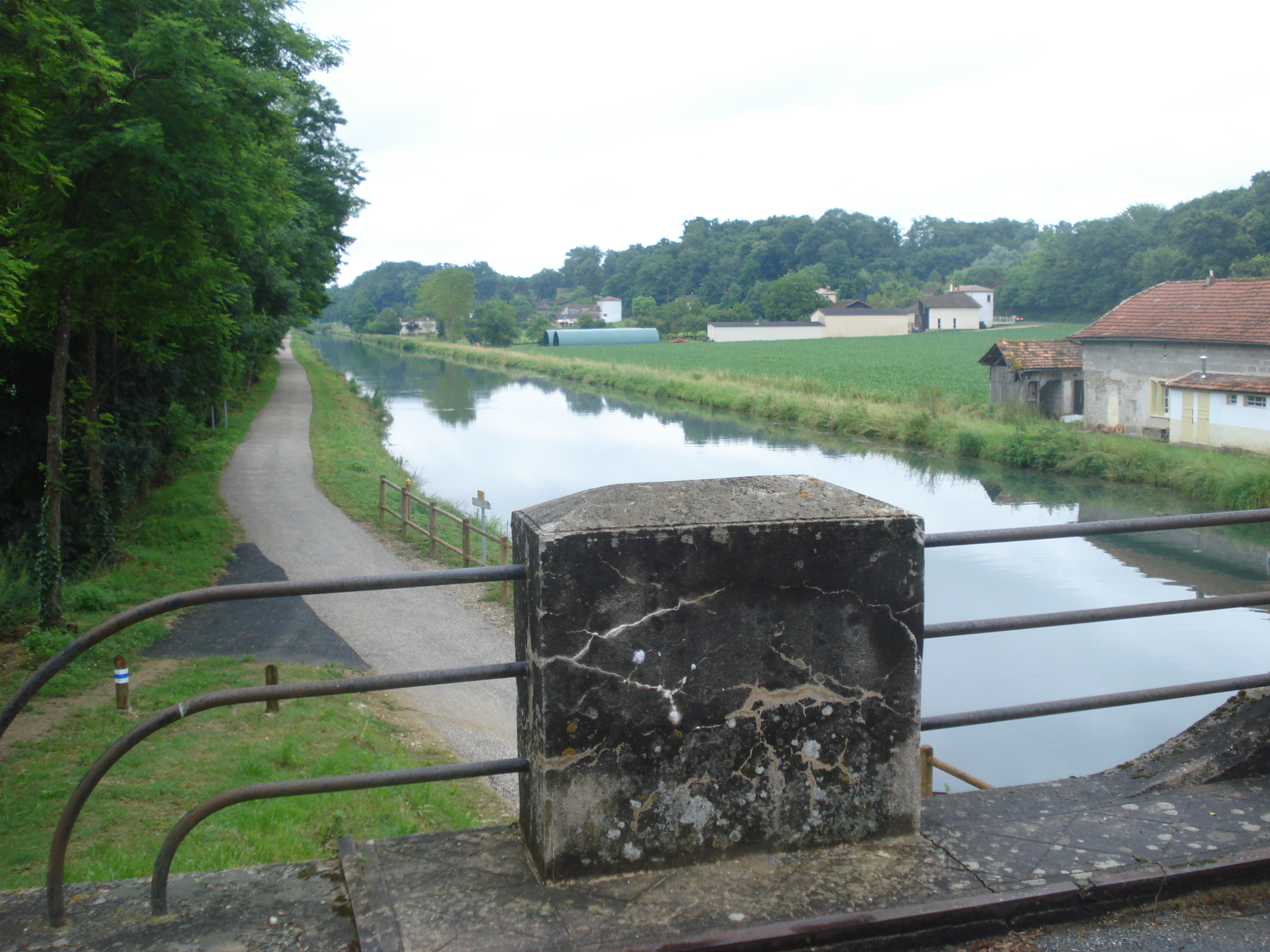
- Canal latéral à la Garonne in Puybarban in Gironde Department, France

Specifications
- Length: 193 km
- Maximum boat length: 30.65 m (100.6 ft)
- Maximum boat beam: 5.80 m (19.0 ft)
- Locks: 53
- Maximum height above sea level: 128 m (420 ft)
- Minimum height above sea level: 0 m (0 ft)

History
- Construction began: 1838
- Date completed: 1856
- Date restored: During 1970s, locks lengthened to 38m

Geography
- Start point: Toulouse
- End point: Castets-en-Dorthe
- Beginning coordinates: 43.61156°N 1.41827°E
- Ending coordinates: 44.56387°N 0.15546°W
- Connects to: Canal de Brienne, Canal du Midi, Canal de Montech, Garonne, Tarn

The Garonne Canal (French: Canal latéral à la Garonne, pronounced [kanal lateʁal a la ɡaʁɔn]) or Canal de Garonne ([kanal də ɡaʁɔn]) is a French canal dating from the mid-19th century that connects Toulouse to Castets-en-Dorthe. The remainder of the route to Bordeaux uses the river Garonne. It is the continuation of the Canal du Midi which connects the Mediterranean with Toulouse.

Together, they and the Garonne form the Canal des Deux Mers which connects the Mediterranean Sea to the Atlantic Ocean.

== Geography ==
=== Description ===
The canal runs along the right bank of the Garonne, crosses the river in Agen via the Agen aqueduct, then continues along the left bank. It is connected to the Canal du Midi at its source in Toulouse, and emerges at Castets-en-Dorthe on the Garonne, 54 km southwest of Bordeaux, a point where the river is navigable.

The canal is supplied with water from the Garonne by two sources:

- The Canal de Brienne in Toulouse, taking up to 7 m^{3}/s from the river Garonne upstream of Bazacle dam
- The Brax pumping station near Agen.

With the exception of the five locks at Montech, bypassed by the water slope, all of the locks have a length of 40.5 m and a width of 6 m. The locks at Montech are as built, 30.65 m long.

More than 100 bridges were built on the canal. Many were rebuilt in 1933 as prestressed concrete bow bridges, to allow for the requirements of larger barges.

=== Canal specifications ===
The canal has a width of 18 meters at the water level. It has 53 locks, with a total difference in level of 128 meters. Its design depth is 2 metres, for a draught of 1.80 metres (although a practical maximum of 1.30 metres, especially at Castets-en-Dorthe, exists as of June 2017). The minimum headroom beneath bridges and other structures is 3.60 metres.

== History ==
Map of Canal de Garonne.

=== Water supply and the Canal du Midi ===
The benefits of a continental waterway between the Atlantic Ocean and the Mediterranean Sea were recognized even in antiquity; such a route would bypass the dangerous 3,000 km journey through the Strait of Gibraltar and along the Atlantic coast of the Iberian Peninsula. Studies were commissioned by Nero, Augustus, Charlemagne, Francis I of France, Charles IX of France and Henry IV of France, but no scheme came to fruition. The primary difficulty was in supplying sufficient water at the watershed between the Mediterranean and the Atlantic to ensure continuous navigation.

Between 1614 and 1662, France, under Louis XIII and Louis XIV, initiated five projects to solve the water supply problem, but none succeeded. The problem was solved in the 1660s by Pierre-Paul Riquet. Drawing on his knowledge of the Montagne Noire and its watercourses, Riquet's scheme diverted water from multiple streams and rivers to the Mediterranean-Atlantic watershed boundary near Seuil de Naurouze. He was inspired by Adam de Craponne's theories, which had been used earlier by Hugues Cosnier to construct the Briare Canal.

From 1667 to 1681, Riquet built the Canal royal en Languedoc (now the Canal du Midi) between Toulouse and Sète. Riquet may have intended to extend the canal westwards toward the Atlantic, but that was not done; the state could not afford the work since it was expanding the Château de Versailles, and Louis XIV had poor finances. For the next two centuries, boats were required to navigate the Garonne to reach the Atlantic and deal with flooding and, as boat size increased, groundings.

=== Construction of the canal ===
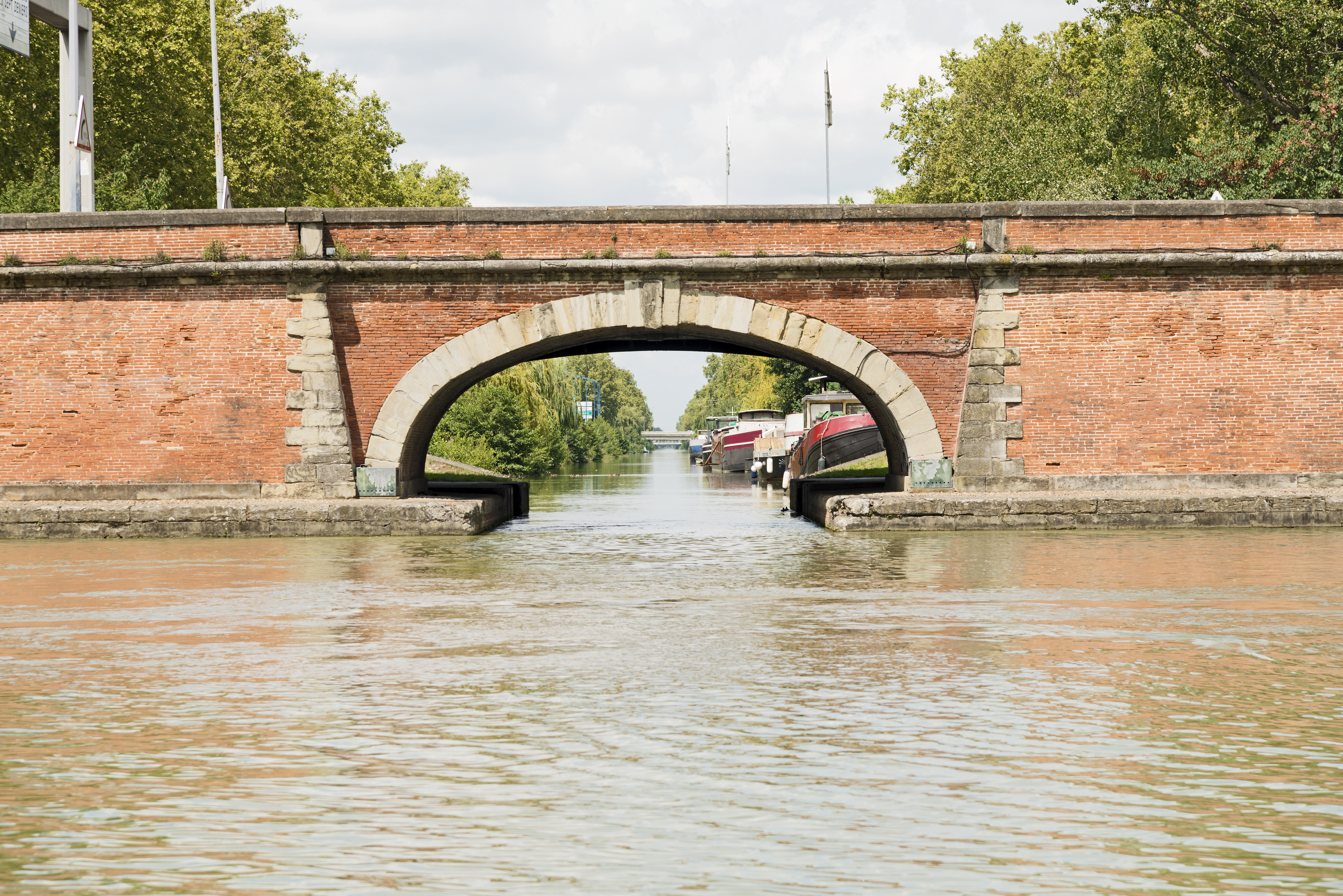
Origin in Toulouse

The Becquey Plan of 1821 to 1822 proposed the improvement of waterways in France to expand haulage in support of the Industrial Revolution. A survey for a canal along the Garonne was ordered in 1828 and completed in 1830. In 1832, the state granted the private Magendie-Sion company, owned by Dion, a perpetual concession for the construction of the Canal Latéral à la Garonne using water drawn from the Garonne through the Canal de Saint-Pierre or the Canal de Brienne. Dion rejected the terms. On 9 July 1835, the state simultaneously threatened to withdraw the offer and mandated new construction dates. Dion died before work had started. In 1838, the state gave 100,000 francs to Dion's heirs and repurchased parts of the project for 150,000 francs.

The project was taken over by the state. Divisionary Inspector of Bridges and Roads Jean-Baptiste de Baudre was placed in charge. Work started in 1838 with a budget of forty million francs. Construction began at several points simultaneously, with thousands of workmen building the 193 kilometres of canal and other structures like the Agen aqueduct. In 1844, the section from Toulouse to Montech to Montauban opened. The canal subsequently opened for navigation to Buzet-sur-Baïse in 1853 and upstream by 1856.

=== Before 1970 ===
The canal was completed at the same time as the Bordeaux–Sète railway, which followed the same route. The first trains left Agen station in 1857.

At first, the railway did not compete with water transport, but the state later conceded the canal's exploitation rights to the Compagnie des chemins de fer du Midi, the direct competitor of the boatmen. The railway company increased levies on water transport, and when the concession was withdrawn in 1898, the damage had already been done since between 1850 and 1893, water freight diminished by two thirds.

However, until about 1970, the Canal Latéral à la Garonne was still concerned mainly with the transport of goods.

=== After 1970 ===
In the years before 1970, the canal was upgraded to allow larger boats of the Freycinet gauge to deal with increasing traffic on both canals of the Canal des deux Mers. However, it was a new kind of traffic which saved the connection between the two seas: river and canal tourism.

That developed enormously after 1970. Boats brought visitors to an exceptional site of natural and historical significance. In 1996, the Canal du Midi was classed as a UNESCO World Heritage Site, which benefited the connecting Canal de Garonne as well.

More than half of tourism activity is concerned with the hiring of unlicensed boats, and nearly 1000 boats travel between the Mediterranean and Atlantic and vice versa each year. Professional boat services include hotel boats such as the Saint Louis and boat restaurants.

The tourist fleet has grown from 12 boats in 1970 to 450 boats today and employs 500 people on a permanent basis. The economic impact of this activity is important and raises 10-60% the parts of the economy relating to the canal in the towns and villages through which it passes. The tourist industry contributes €26m per year. The canal was extensively featured on the BBC television series Rick Stein's French Odyssey (2005).

== Infrastructure ==
- The locks: the canal originally had 56 locks to which 4 locks were added to connect with the Garonne at Castets-en-Dorthe.
- The Montech water slope: this structure, the brainchild of the engineer Jean Aubert, came into service in 1974. The slope allows a flight of five locks to be bypassed by large vessels but has been out of commission since a breakdown in 2009.
- The Aqueducts: seven aqueducts allow the canal to cross the Garonne and its tributaries, such as that over the river Baïse. The most significant two are the Agen aqueduct, 600 metres long with 23 arches and the Cacor Aqueduct at Moissac over the Tarn, 356 metres long with 13 arches.
- A double staircase lock at Moissac gives access to the lowest section of the Tarn and a short length of the Garonne rendered navigable by the dam built to supply cooling water to the Golfech nuclear power plant
- The Canal de Montech, also known as the Montauban Branch, provides a connection from the main line of the Canal de Garonne, at Montech, with the Tarn at Montauban. A proposal exists to create a waterway ring by restoring navigation to the stretch of the Tarn between Moissac and Montauban.

== See also ==
- List of canals in France
- Canal du Midi
- Pierre-Paul Riquet
