= Tarn (river) =

River in southern France

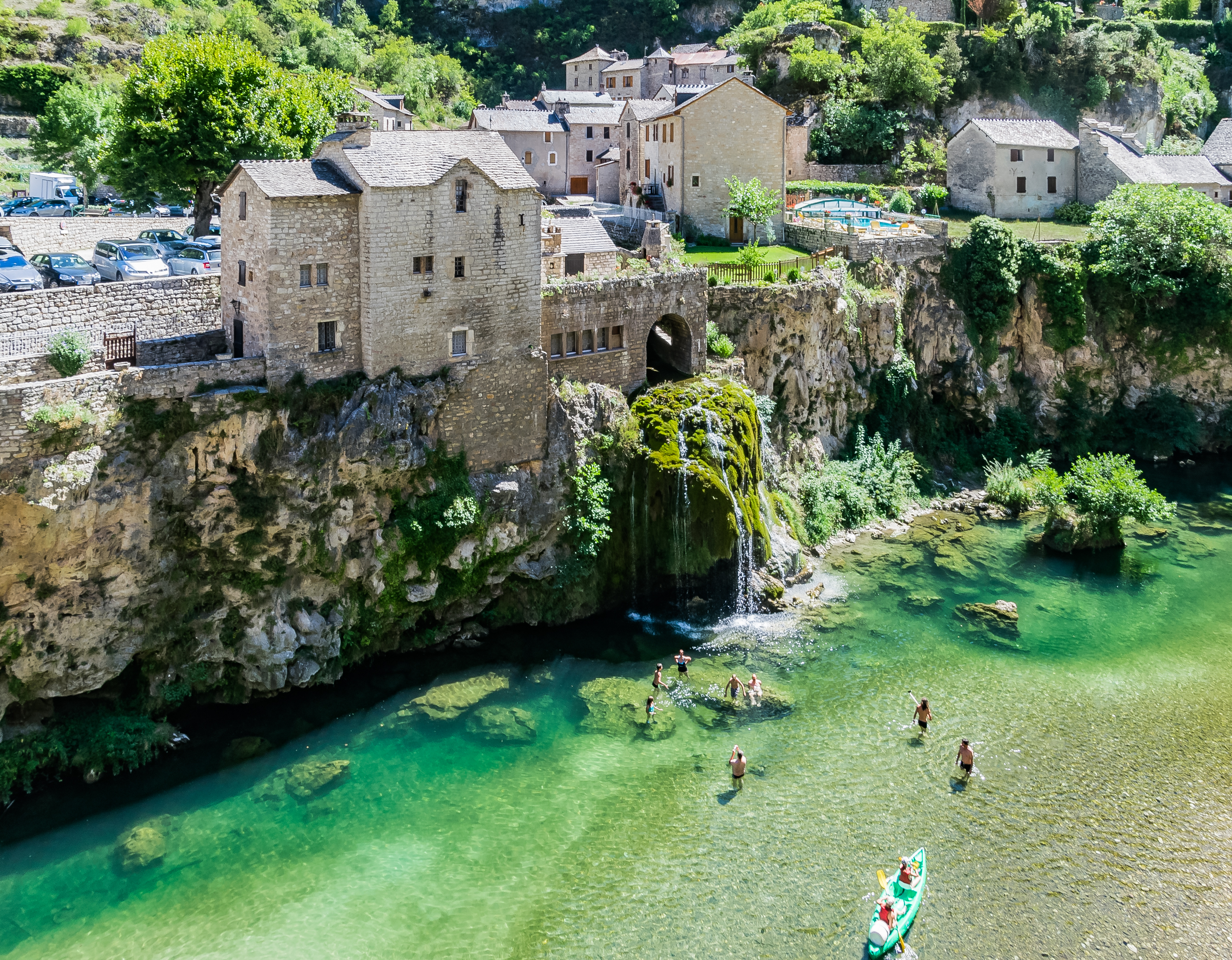
- The Tarn in Saint-Chély-du-Tarn, Gorges du Tarn Causses

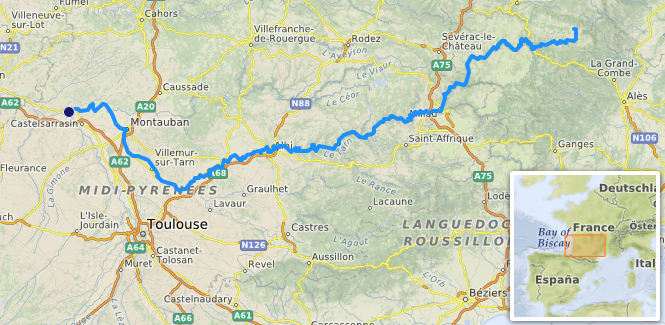
- Path of the Tarn

Location
- Country: France

Physical characteristics
- Source: Mont Lozère
  - location: Cévennes, France
  - coordinates: 44.41472°N 3.81500°E
  - elevation: 1,550 m (5,090 ft)
- Mouth: Garonne
  - location: Moissac, France
  - coordinates: 44.086111°N 1.0425°E
- Length: 380 km (240 mi)
- Basin size: 15,700 km^{2} (6,100 sq mi)
- Discharge
  - average: 140 m^{3}/s (4,900 cu ft/s)

Basin features
- Progression: Garonne→ Gironde estuary→ Atlantic Ocean

The Tarn (French pronunciation: [taʁn]; Occitan: Tarn, Latin: Tarnis, possibly meaning 'rapid' or 'walled in') is a 380.2-kilometre (236.2 mi) long river in the administrative region of Occitania in southern France. It is a right tributary of the Garonne.

The Tarn runs in a roughly westerly direction, from its source at an elevation of 1,550 m (5,090 ft) on Mont Lozère in the Cévennes mountains (part of the Massif Central), through the deep gorges and canyons of the Gorges du Tarn that cuts through the Causse du Larzac, to Moissac in Tarn-et-Garonne, where it joins the Garonne, 4 km (2.5 mi) downstream from the centre of town.

Its basin covers approximately 12,000 square kilometres (4,600 sq mi), and it has a mean flow of approximately 140 cubic metres per second (4,900 cu ft/s).

The Millau Viaduct spans the valley of the Tarn near Millau, and is now one of the area's most popular attractions.

== Main tributaries ==
The tributaries of the Tarn include:

- Agout (in Saint-Sulpice)
- Alrance
- Aveyron (near Montauban)
- Cernon
- Dourbie (in Millau)
- Dourdou de Camarès
- Jonte (in Le Rozier)
- Lemboulas
- Lumensonesque
- Muze
- Rance (near Trébas)
- Tarnon (in Florac)
- Tescou

The Tarn separates the Narbonne and Aquitaine basins.

== Departments and cities ==
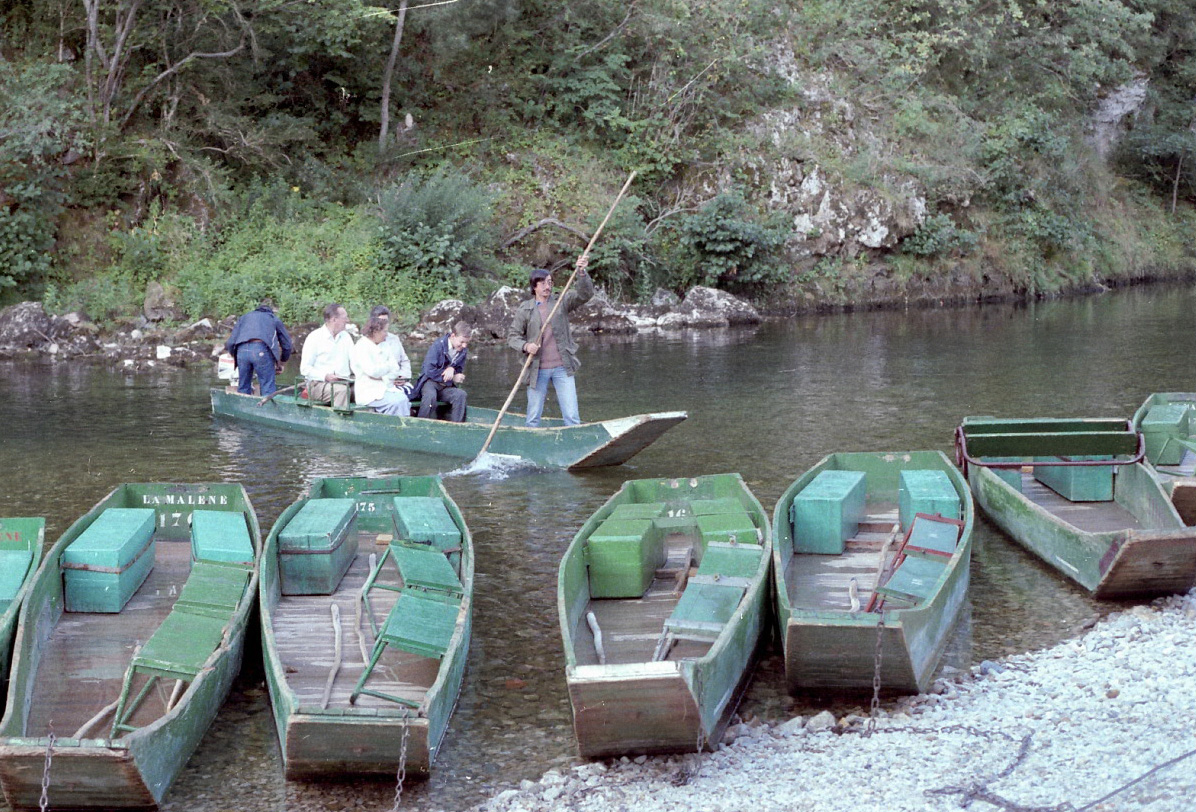
A boatman with some tourists begins a ride through the Gorges du Tarn

The Tarn passes through the following departments and towns:

- Lozère: Le Pont-de-Montvert, Sainte-Enimie
- Aveyron: Millau
- Tarn: Albi, Gaillac, Lisle-sur-Tarn, Rabastens
- Haute-Garonne: Villemur-sur-Tarn
- Tarn-et-Garonne: Montauban, Moissac.

The Millau Viaduct, the tallest bridge in the world, carrying the A75 autoroute across the Tarn Gorge near Millau, opened in December 2004.

The Tarn is famous for its brutal floods, which are the most dangerous in Europe along with the Danube. The floods of March 1930 saw the Tarn rise more than 17 metres (56 feet) above its normal level in Montauban in just 24 hours, with a discharge of 7,000 cubic metres per second (250,000 cu ft/s) (the average discharge of the Rhine is 2,200 cubic metres per second (78,000 cu ft/s); the average discharge of the Nile during the traditional annual flooding before the building of the Aswan Dam was 8,500 cubic metres per second (300,000 cu ft/s); the average discharge of the Mississippi River is 16,200 cubic metres per second (570,000 cu ft/s)). One third of the Tarn-et-Garonne department was flooded, about 300 people died, thousands of houses were destroyed, the low-lying districts of Montauban were destroyed, and the town of Moissac was almost entirely destroyed.

== Navigation ==
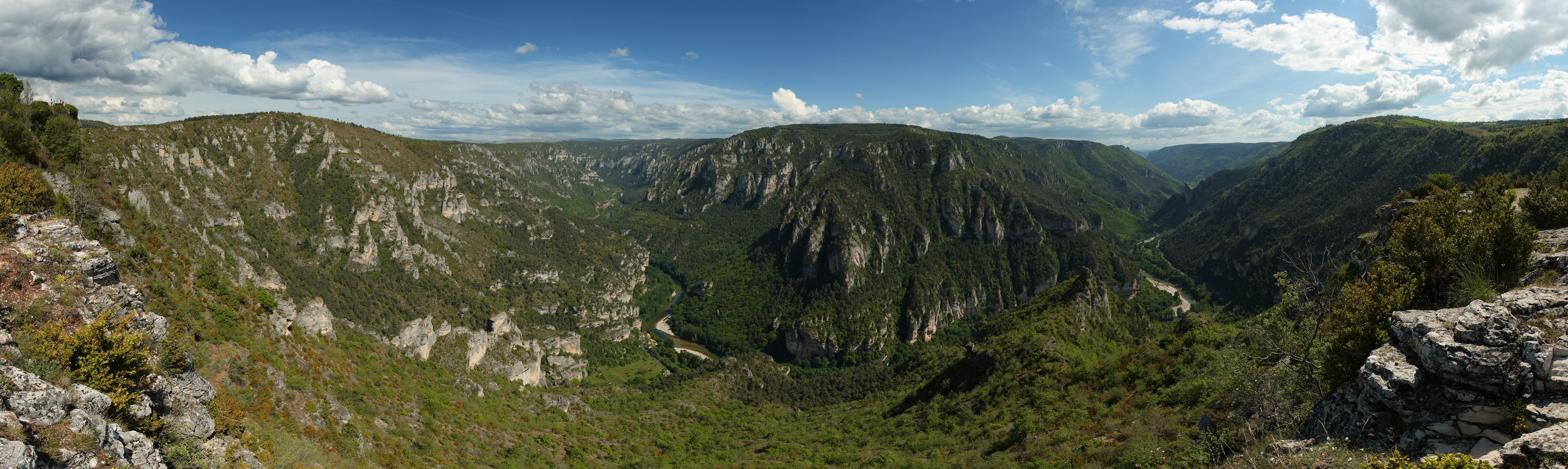
Tarn gorge, seen from the point sublime

The Tarn was once navigable from its junction with the Garonne to Corbarieu, near Montauban. This stretch of river included seven river locks over a distance of 38 kilometres (24 mi). The canal was linked to the Canal de Garonne in Moissac by a branch lock upstream of the first river lock, and again, via the Canal de Montech, at Montauban.

The two access points from the Canal de Garonne have both been restored, and boats can again access the immediate reaches of the river at these points. Additionally the first river lock, between Moissac and the Garonne itself, has been flooded by the barrage for the Golfech power station on the Garonne, and is permanently open to boats which can thus reach the Garonne and navigate a short distance of that river.

The remaining six river locks are disused and unnavigable. A proposal exists to restore the five river locks between Moissac and Montauban, thus creating a waterway ring consisting of the Tarn from Moissac to Montauban, the Canal de Montech to Montech and the Canal de Garonne back to Moissac.

== See also ==
- Gorges du Tarn
- Tourism in Tarn
