= Castillon-de-Castets =

- Part of Castets et Castillon
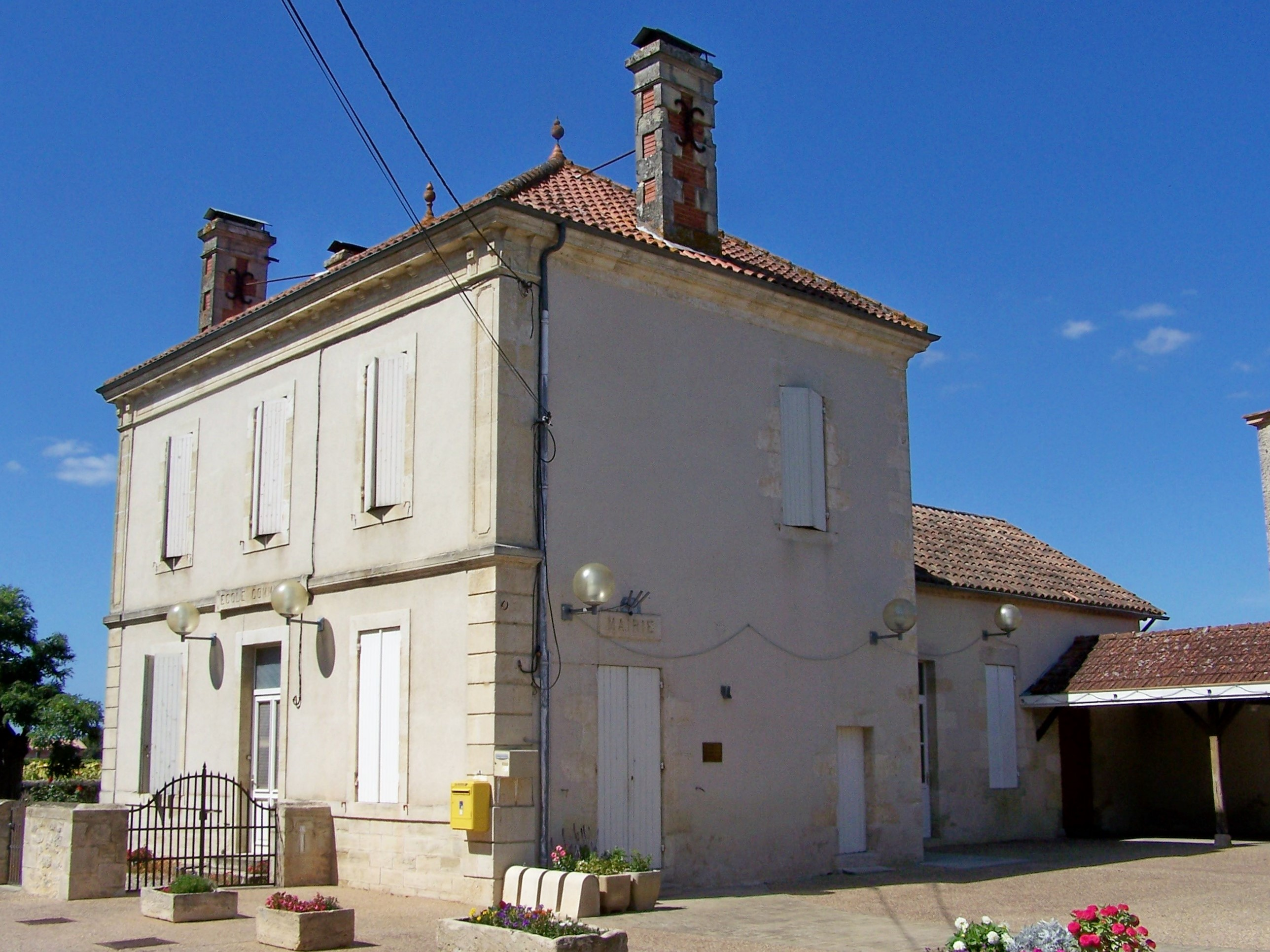
- Town hall
- Location of Castillon-de-Castets
- Location within France Location within Nouvelle-Aquitaine
- Coordinates: 44°33′02″N 0°06′51″W
- Country: France
- Region: Nouvelle-Aquitaine
- Department: Gironde
- Arrondissement: Langon
- Canton: Le Réolais et Les Bastides
- Commune: Castets et Castillon
- Area^{1}: 4.47 km^{2} (1.73 sq mi)
- Elevation: 50 m (160 ft)
- Highest elevation: 56 m (184 ft)
- Lowest elevation: 12 m (39 ft)
- Population (2023): 290
  - Density: 65/km^{2} (170/sq mi)
- Time zone: UTC+01:00 (CET)
  - Summer (DST): UTC+02:00 (CEST)
- Postal code: 33210
- ^{1} French Land Register data, which excludes lakes, ponds, glaciers > 1 km^{2} (0.386 sq mi or 247 acres) and river estuaries.

Castillon-de-Castets (French pronunciation: [kastijɔ̃ də kastɛts]; Gascon: Castilhon de Castèths) is a former commune in the Gironde department in Nouvelle-Aquitaine in southwestern France. On 1 January 2017, it was merged into the new commune Castets et Castillon.

== See also ==
- Communes of the Gironde department
