= Castets-en-Dorthe =

- Part of Castets et Castillon
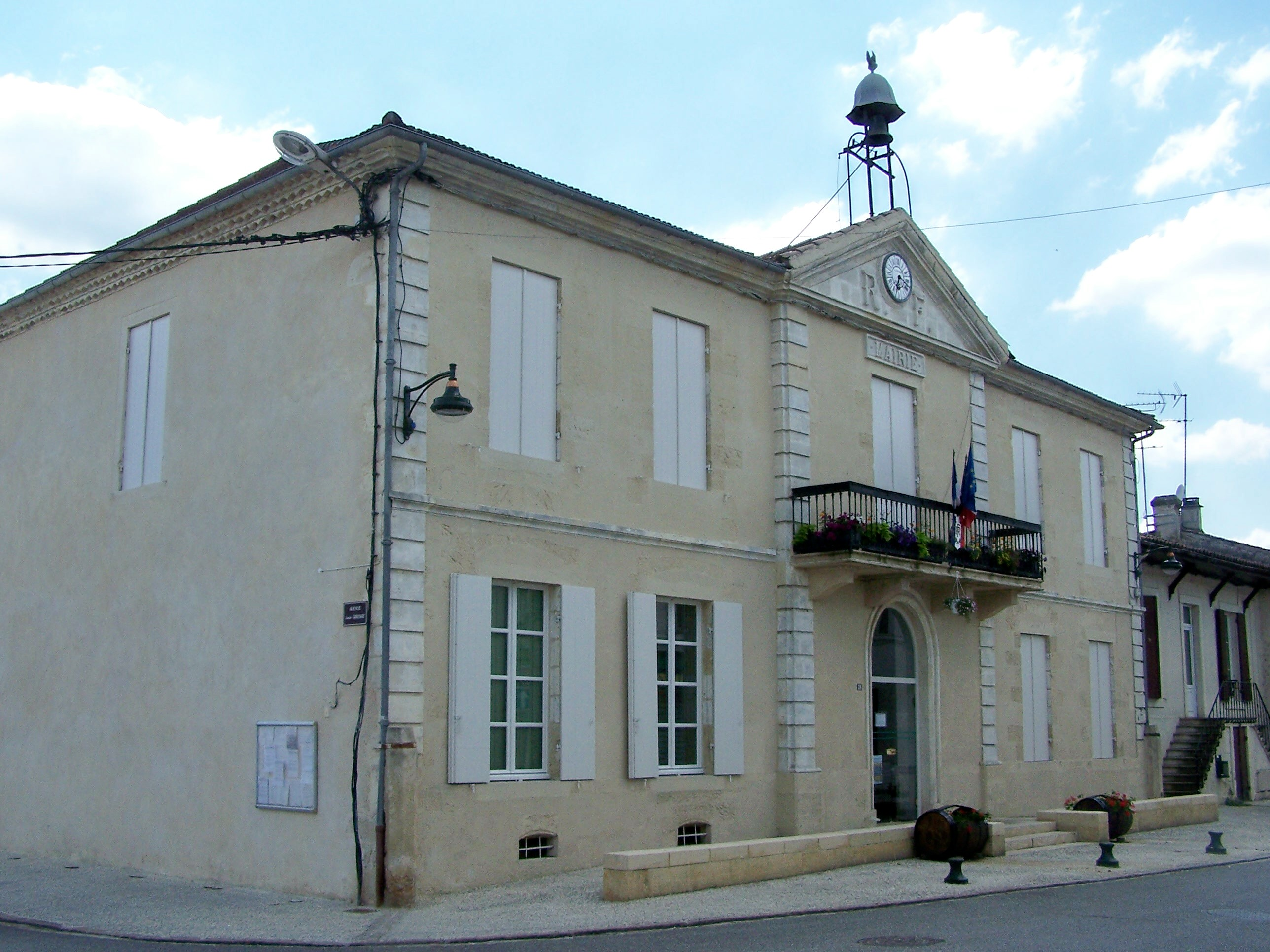
- Town hall
- Location of Castets-en-Dorthe
- Location within France Location within Nouvelle-Aquitaine
- Coordinates: 44°33′46″N 0°09′07″W
- Country: France
- Region: Nouvelle-Aquitaine
- Department: Gironde
- Arrondissement: Langon
- Canton: Le Sud-Gironde
- Commune: Castets et Castillon
- Area^{1}: 8.69 km^{2} (3.36 sq mi)
- Elevation: 20 m (66 ft)
- Highest elevation: 56 m (184 ft)
- Lowest elevation: 6 m (20 ft)
- Population (2022): 1,251
  - Density: 144/km^{2} (373/sq mi)
- Time zone: UTC+01:00 (CET)
  - Summer (DST): UTC+02:00 (CEST)
- Postal code: 33210
- ^{1} French Land Register data, which excludes lakes, ponds, glaciers > 1 km^{2} (0.386 sq mi or 247 acres) and river estuaries.

Castets-en-Dorthe (French pronunciation: [kastɛts ɑ̃ dɔʁt]; Gascon: Castèths Andòrta) is a former commune in the Gironde department in Nouvelle-Aquitaine in southwestern France. On 1 January 2017, it was merged into the new commune Castets et Castillon.

The village lies at the junction of the Canal de Garonne with the river Garonne.

== Population ==
Historical population
Year	Pop.	±% p.a.
1962	953	—
1968	920	−0.59%
1975	889	−0.49%
1982	829	−0.99%
1990	996	+2.32%
1999	1,124	+1.35%
2022	1,251	+0.47%
Source: EHESS and INSEE

== See also ==
- Communes of the Gironde department
