= Agen aqueduct =

Pont-canal d'Agen
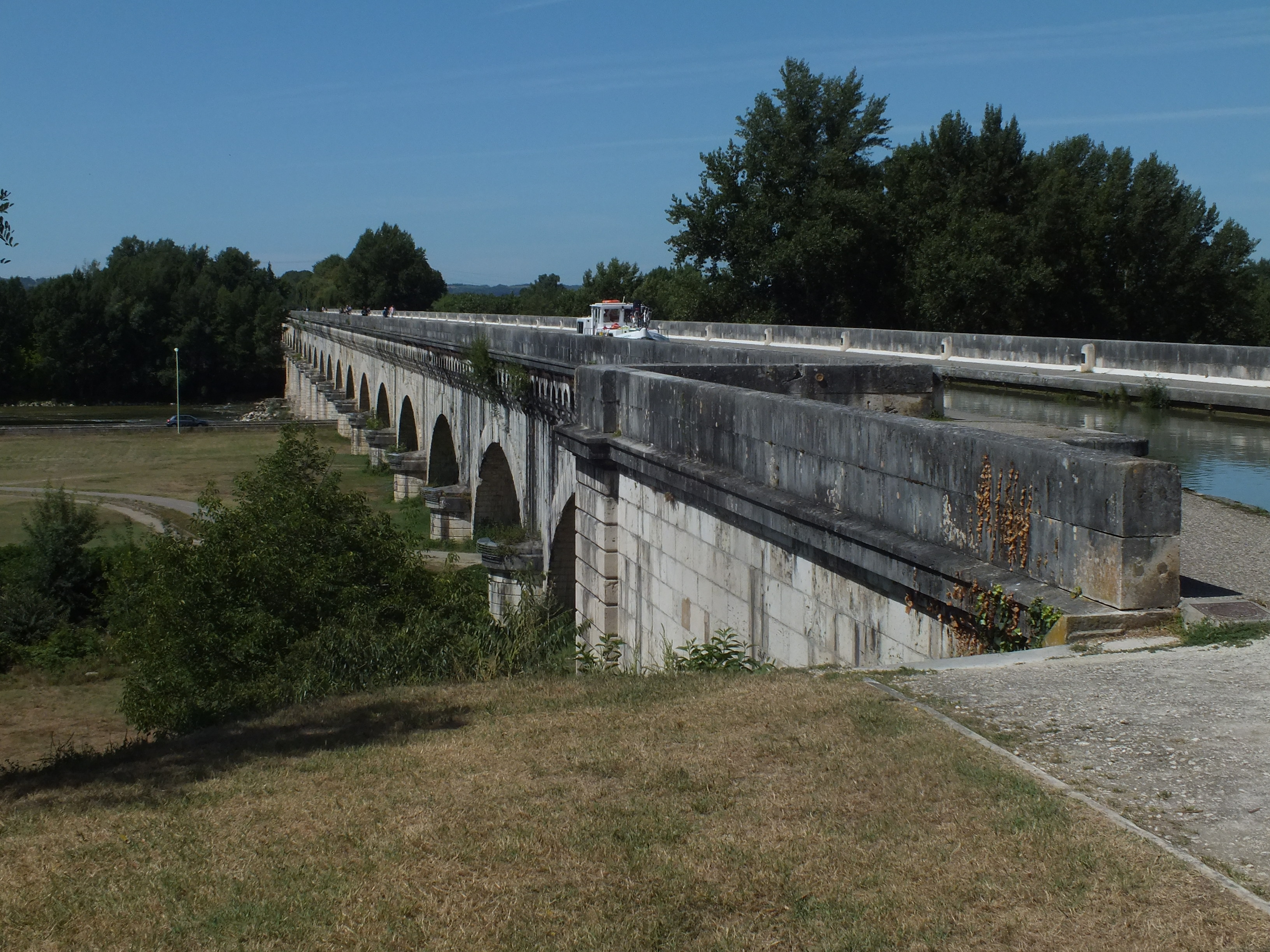
- The Agen Aqueduct
- Coordinates: 44°12′28″N 00°36′19″E
- Carries: Canal de Garonne
- Locale: Agen

Characteristics
- Design: Masonry Arch
- Total length: 539m
- Width: 12.48m
- Height: 10m

History
- Opened: 1849

Location
- Interactive map of Pont-canal d'Agen

The Agen Aqueduct ((in French) Pont-canal d'Agen) is an aqueduct which carries the canal de Garonne across the Garonne. It is located in the Agen commune, in the Aquitaine region of France.

== Description ==
The aqueduct is a dressed stone masonry structure consisting of 23 arches, each of 20m span, which at the time of its completion was the longest navigable aqueduct in France. It has a length of 539 metres, a width of 12.48m and a canal width of 8.82m.

The width of the channel is insufficient to allow boats to pass each other whilst on the aqueduct. Boats must wait for oncoming traffic to clear the aqueduct before crossing. There is a lock and a canal basin downstream, and a canal basin upstream, of the aqueduct.

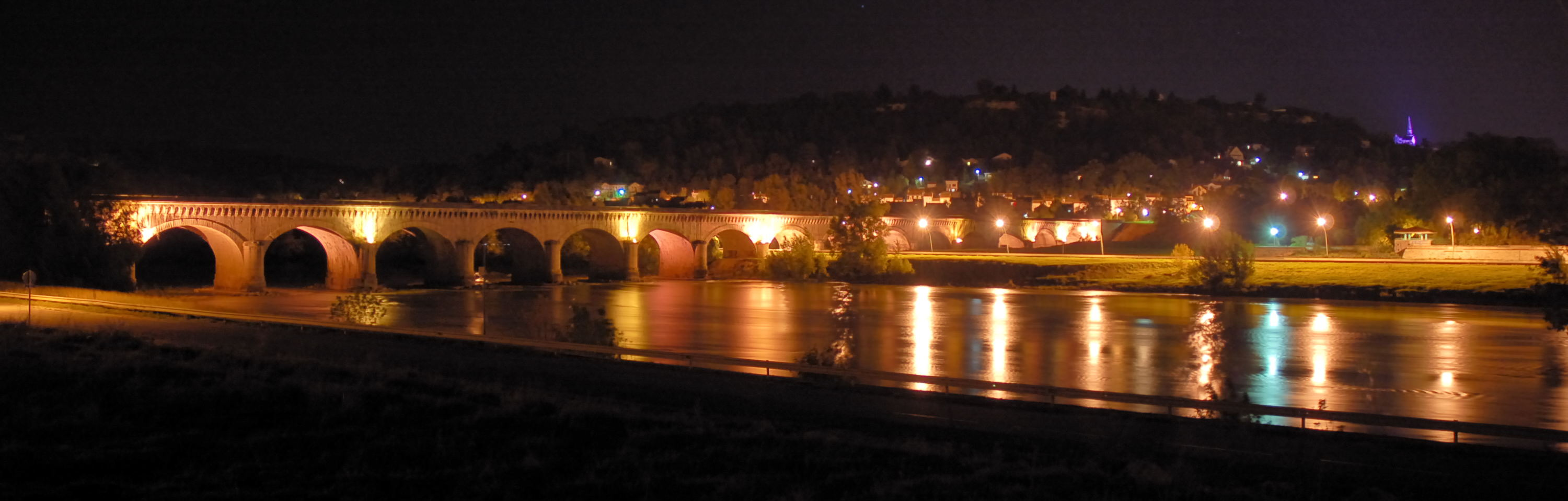
Agen Aqueduct

== History ==
The aqueduct was built entirely of stone blocks from Quercy, under the direction of the engineer Jean-Baptiste de Baudre. On 25 August 1839 Ferdinand Philippe, Duke of Orléans laid the first stone. In 1841 the building of the Bordeaux to Toulouse railway interrupted work on the canal and the aqueduct was rented to farmers for use as a short cut avoiding the Bridge of Agen. The tolls however, were too high to make this idea work. On 5 May 1846 the work was ordered to resume by a vote in favour of a government act. The aqueduct finally came into service in 1849.

== See also ==
- Montech water slope
- Canal de Garonne
- Agen
