= Castets et Castillon =

- Commune
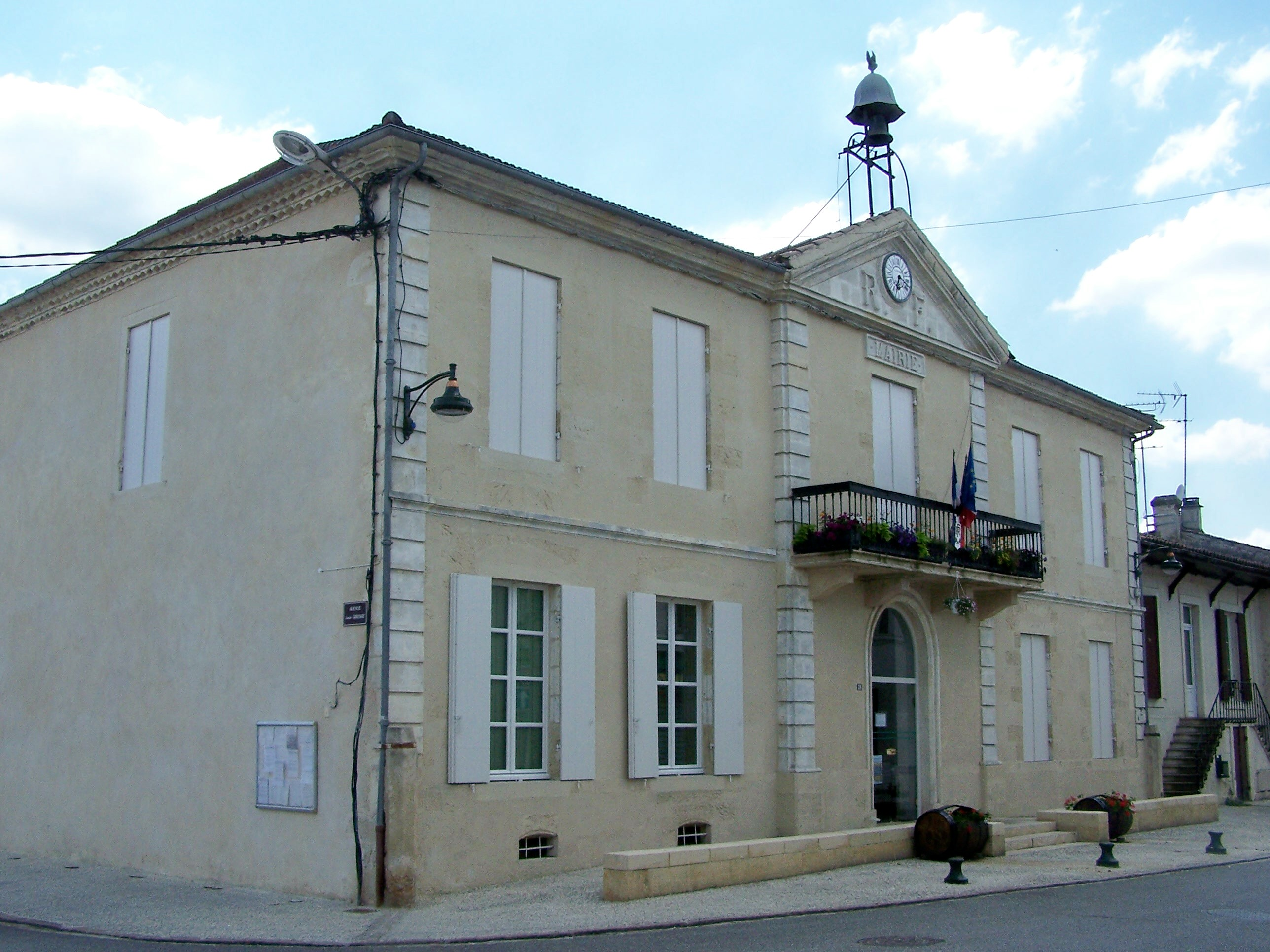
- The town hall in Castets-en-Dorthe
- Location of Castets et Castillon
- Location within France Location within Nouvelle-Aquitaine
- Coordinates: 44°33′47″N 0°09′07″W
- Country: France
- Region: Nouvelle-Aquitaine
- Department: Gironde
- Arrondissement: Langon
- Canton: Le Sud-Gironde
- Intercommunality: Sud Gironde
- Area^{1}: 13.16 km^{2} (5.08 sq mi)
- Population (2023): 1,551
  - Density: 117.9/km^{2} (305.2/sq mi)
- Time zone: UTC+01:00 (CET)
  - Summer (DST): UTC+02:00 (CEST)
- INSEE/Postal code: 33106 /33120
- ^{1} French Land Register data, which excludes lakes, ponds, glaciers > 1 km^{2} (0.386 sq mi or 247 acres) and river estuaries.

Castets et Castillon (Gascon: Castèths e Castilhon) is a commune in the department of Gironde, southwestern France. The municipality was established on 1 January 2017 by merger of the former communes of Castets-en-Dorthe (the seat) and Castillon-de-Castets.

== See also ==
- Communes of the Gironde department
