= Floudès =

- Commune
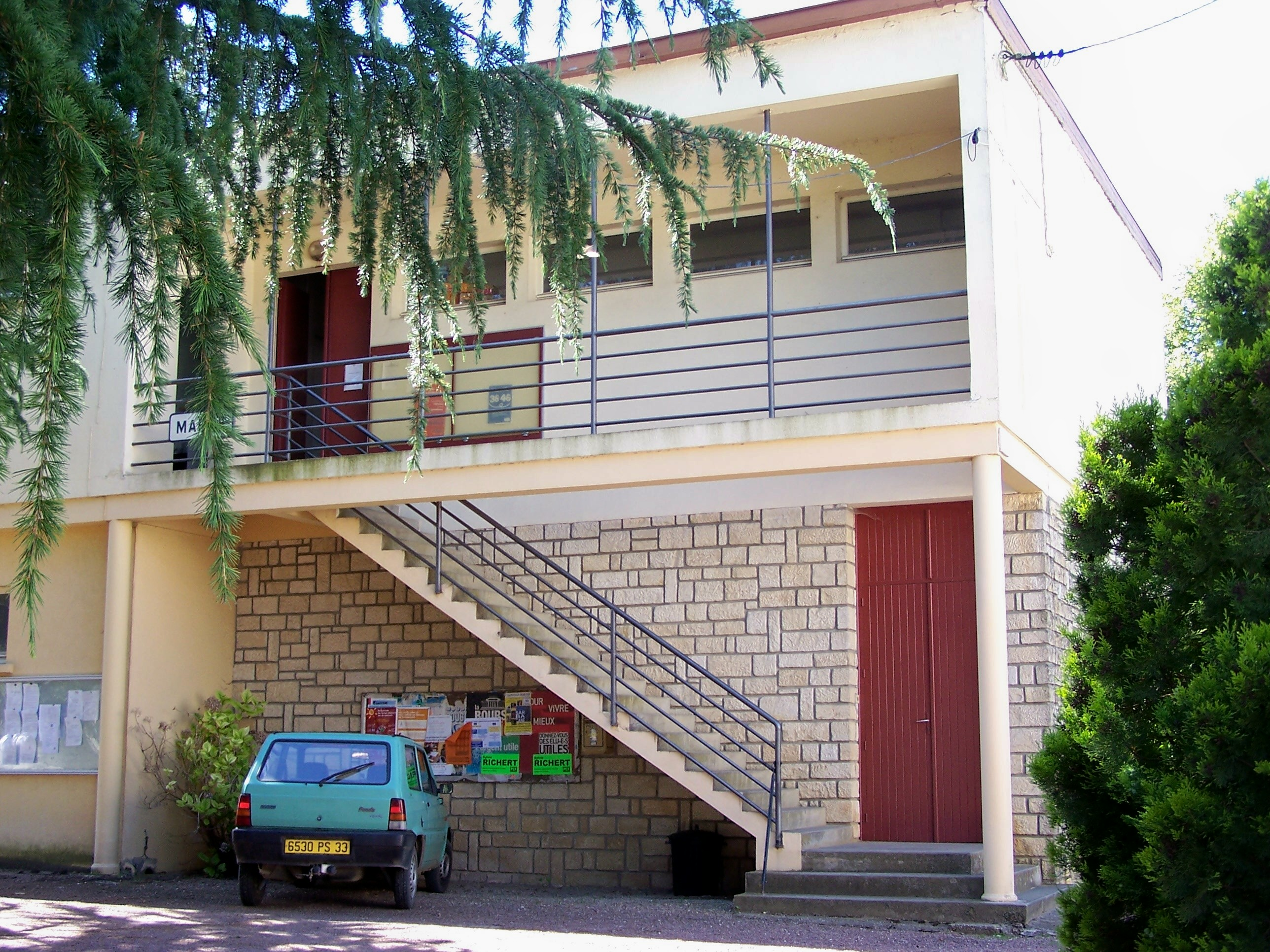
- Town hall
- Location of Floudès
- Location within France Location within Nouvelle-Aquitaine
- Coordinates: 44°34′25″N 0°03′57″W
- Country: France
- Region: Nouvelle-Aquitaine
- Department: Gironde
- Arrondissement: Langon
- Canton: Le Réolais et Les Bastides
- Intercommunality: Réolais en Sud Gironde

Government
  - Mayor (2020–2026): François Quirin
- Area^{1}: 3.7 km^{2} (1.4 sq mi)
- Highest elevation: 16 m (52 ft)
- Lowest elevation: 8 m (26 ft)
- Population (2023): 103
  - Density: 28/km^{2} (72/sq mi)
- Time zone: UTC+01:00 (CET)
  - Summer (DST): UTC+02:00 (CEST)
- INSEE/Postal code: 33169 /33190
- ^{1} French Land Register data, which excludes lakes, ponds, glaciers > 1 km^{2} (0.386 sq mi or 247 acres) and river estuaries.

Floudès (French pronunciation: [fludɛs]; Occitan: Flodés) is a commune in the Gironde department in Nouvelle-Aquitaine in southwestern France.

== Population ==
Historical population
Year	Pop.	±% p.a.
1968	128	—
1975	124	−0.45%
1982	87	−4.94%
1990	85	−0.29%
1999	116	+3.52%
2007	114	−0.22%
2012	93	−3.99%
2017	108	+3.04%
2023	103	−0.79%
Source: INSEE

== See also ==
- Communes of the Gironde department
