= Loupiac-de-la-Réole =

- Commune
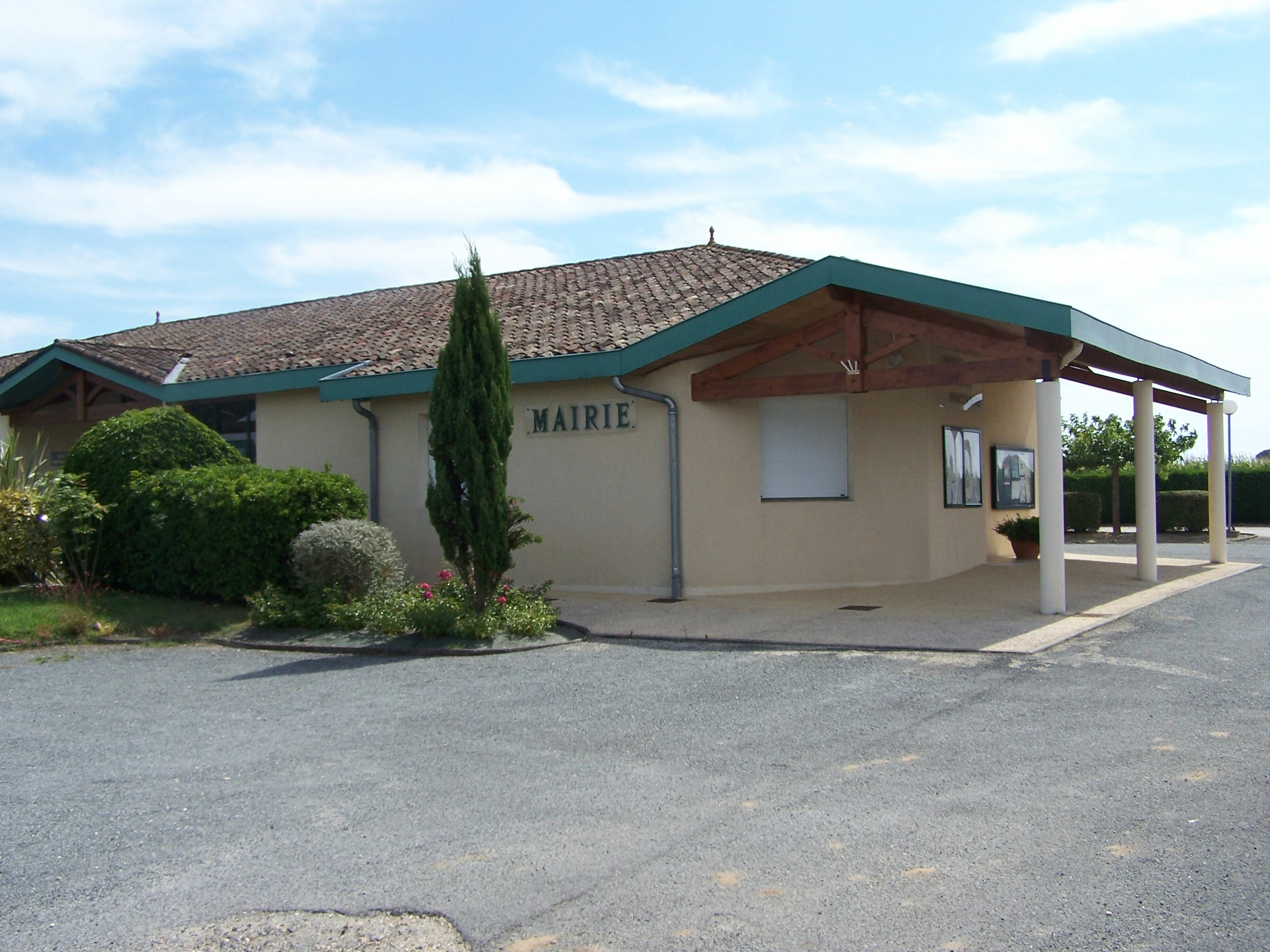
- Town hall
- Location of Loupiac-de-la-Réole
- Location within France Location within Nouvelle-Aquitaine
- Coordinates: 44°32′55″N 0°02′45″W
- Country: France
- Region: Nouvelle-Aquitaine
- Department: Gironde
- Arrondissement: Langon
- Canton: Le Réolais et Les Bastides
- Intercommunality: Réolais en Sud Gironde

Government
  - Mayor (2020–2026): Emmanuel Gil
- Area^{1}: 5.32 km^{2} (2.05 sq mi)
- Elevation: 52 m (171 ft)
- Highest elevation: 65 m (213 ft)
- Lowest elevation: 13 m (43 ft)
- Population (2023): 527
  - Density: 99.1/km^{2} (257/sq mi)
- Time zone: UTC+01:00 (CET)
  - Summer (DST): UTC+02:00 (CEST)
- INSEE/Postal code: 33254 /33190
- ^{1} French Land Register data, which excludes lakes, ponds, glaciers > 1 km^{2} (0.386 sq mi or 247 acres) and river estuaries.

Loupiac-de-la-Réole (French pronunciation: [lupjak də la ʁeɔl], literally Loupiac of La Réole; Occitan: Lopiac de la Rèula) is a commune in the Gironde department in Nouvelle-Aquitaine in southwestern France.

== Population ==
Historical population
Year	Pop.	±% p.a.
1968	323	—
1975	293	−1.38%
1982	280	−0.65%
1990	319	+1.64%
1999	333	+0.48%
2007	437	+3.46%
2012	479	+1.85%
2017	497	+0.74%
2023	527	+0.98%
Source: INSEE

== See also ==
- Communes of the Gironde department
