= Montech =

- Commune
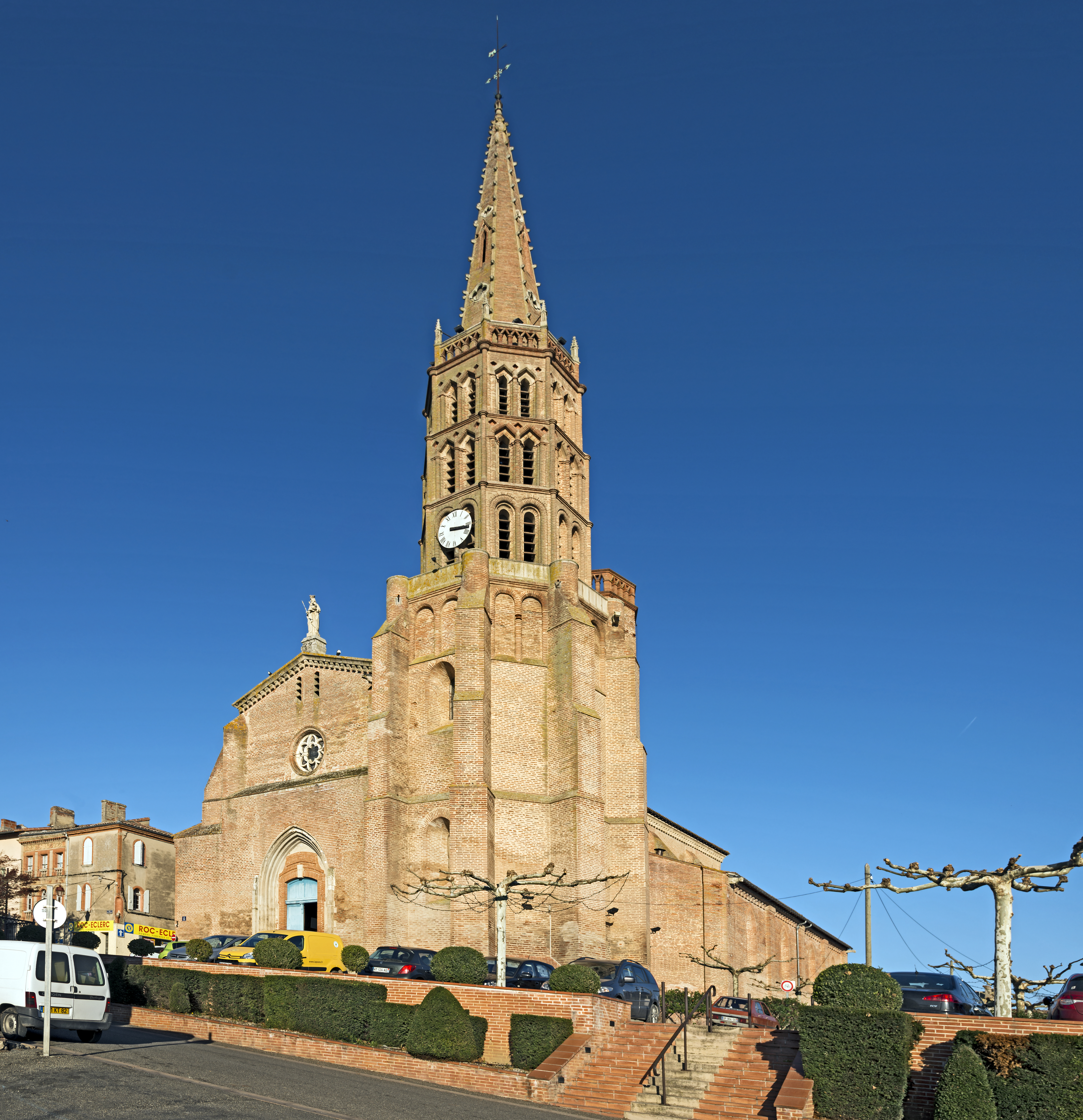
- The church of Our Lady of the Visitation, in Montech

- Coat of arms
- Location of Montech
- Location within France Location within Occitanie
- Coordinates: 43°57′28″N 1°13′50″E
- Country: France
- Region: Occitania
- Department: Tarn-et-Garonne
- Arrondissement: Montauban
- Canton: Montech
- Intercommunality: Grand Sud Tarn et Garonne

Government
  - Mayor (2020–2026): Jacques Moignard
- Area^{1}: 50.14 km^{2} (19.36 sq mi)
- Elevation: 112 m (367 ft)
- Highest elevation: 133 m (436 ft)
- Lowest elevation: 82 m (269 ft)
- Population (2023): 6,663
  - Density: 132.9/km^{2} (344.2/sq mi)
- Time zone: UTC+01:00 (CET)
  - Summer (DST): UTC+02:00 (CEST)
- INSEE/Postal code: 82125 /82700
- ^{1} French Land Register data, which excludes lakes, ponds, glaciers > 1 km^{2} (0.386 sq mi or 247 acres) and river estuaries.

Montech (French pronunciation: [mɔ̃tɛʃ]; Occitan: Montuèg) is a commune in the Tarn-et-Garonne department in the Occitanie region in southern France.

On the Canal de Garonne is the unique Montech water slope, a type of canal inclined plane built in 1974. The slope has been out of service since an engine failure in 2009.

== Population ==
Historical population
| Year | Pop. | ±% p.a. |
|---|---|---|
| 1968 | 2,538 | — |
| 1975 | 2,596 | +0.32% |
| 1982 | 2,775 | +0.96% |
| 1990 | 3,091 | +1.36% |
| 1999 | 3,491 | +1.36% |
| 2007 | 5,065 | +4.76% |
| 2012 | 5,954 | +3.29% |
| 2017 | 6,349 | +1.29% |
| 2023 | 6,663 | +0.81% |
Source: INSEE

== History ==
=== Middle Ages ===
In 1134, on the initiative of Raymond Séradis and d'Alphonse Jourdain, Count of Toulouse, Montech became a fortified site, a Castrum, whose function was to better protect the North of Toulouse. Ten years before Montauban a count's castle was built nearby, around which a new town developed. To the south-east, the castle is integrated with a system of fortifications which are surrounded by deep ditches. The plan adopted for this new town corresponds to a bastide-type plan (the bastides were built in the 13th century) with streets crossing at right angles, a central square, fortified gates with a drawbridge at the cardinal points which became the only access routes.

Towers flanked these gates and three of the wings of the enclosure. The La porte du Terrier (to the north) is the main gate. The city became royal in 1271, at the time of Philip III the Bold who granted it a charter of which several old copies, in Latin, exist. Originally, the parish church of Saint Etienne and its cemetery were located to the northeast of the town, a few hundred meters away. A chapel was probably built near the count's castle, but it was in the 14th century that a new church dedicated to Notre Dame de la Visitation was built. The bottom of the nave and the choir encroach on the lower courtyard of the castle.

The French Wars of Religion made Montech a bastion of Catholicism against Protestant Montauban.

== Monuments ==
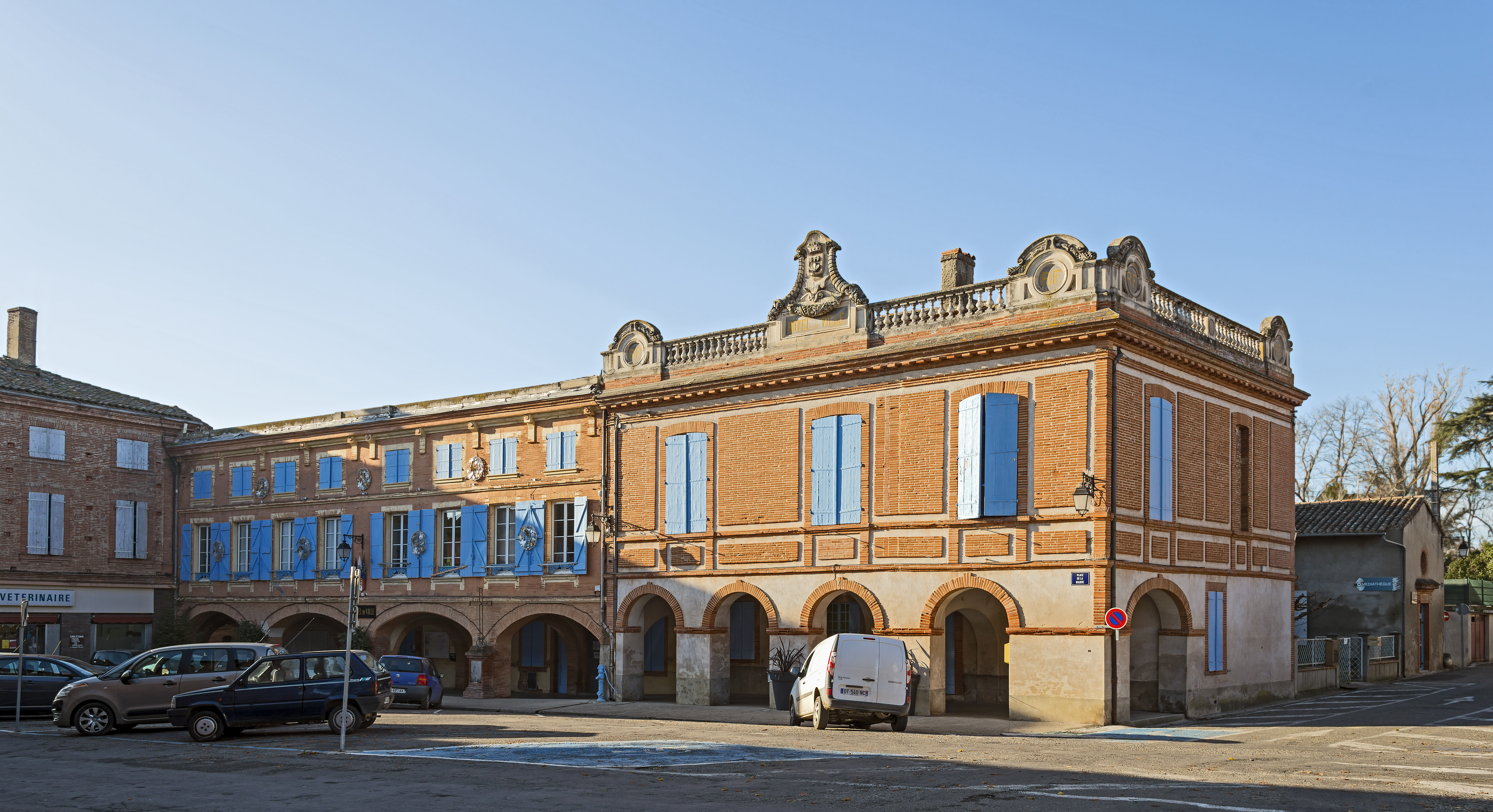
City Hall

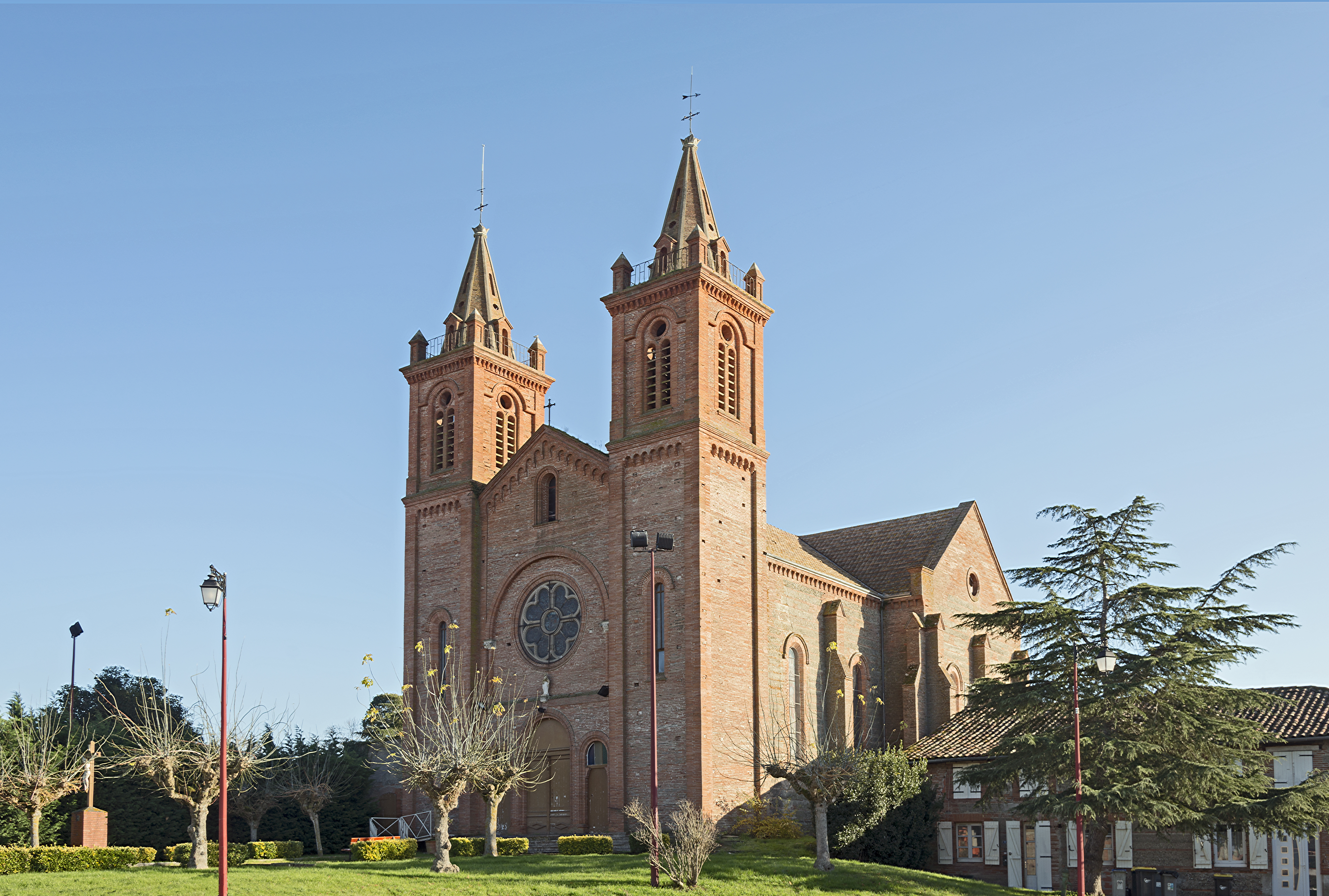
The church 'Our Lady of Feuillade'

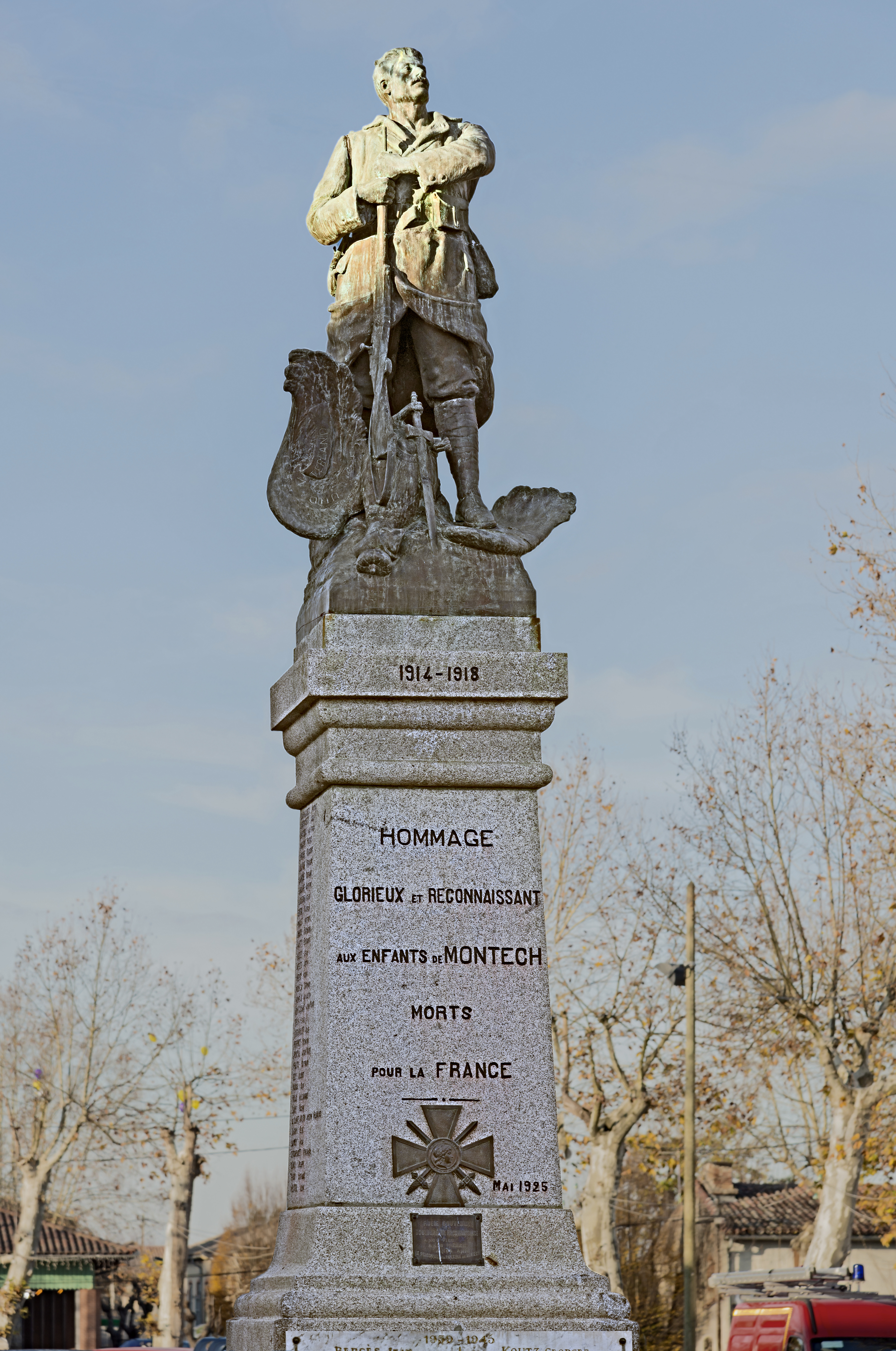
The War Memorial

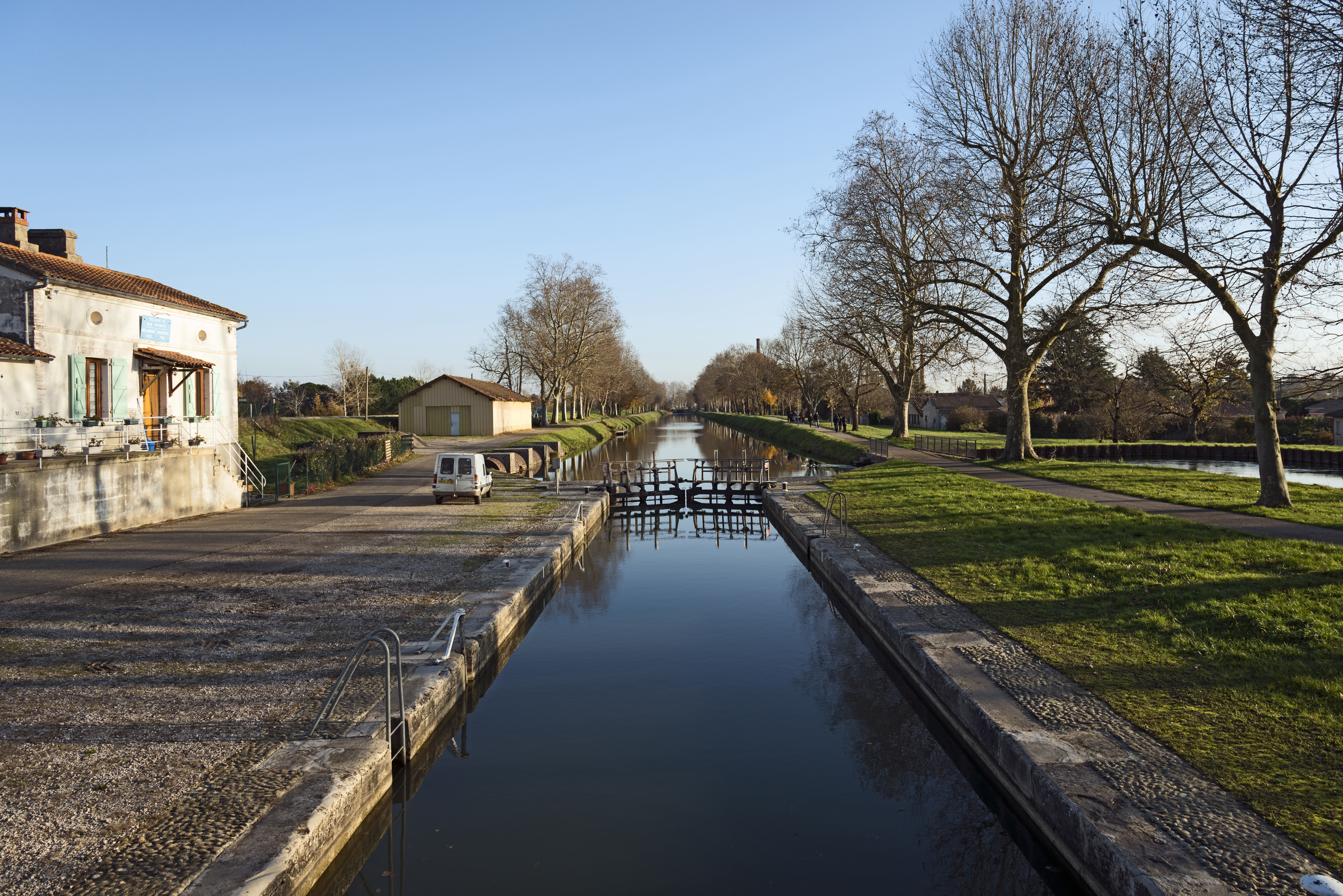
Canal locks of Peyrets

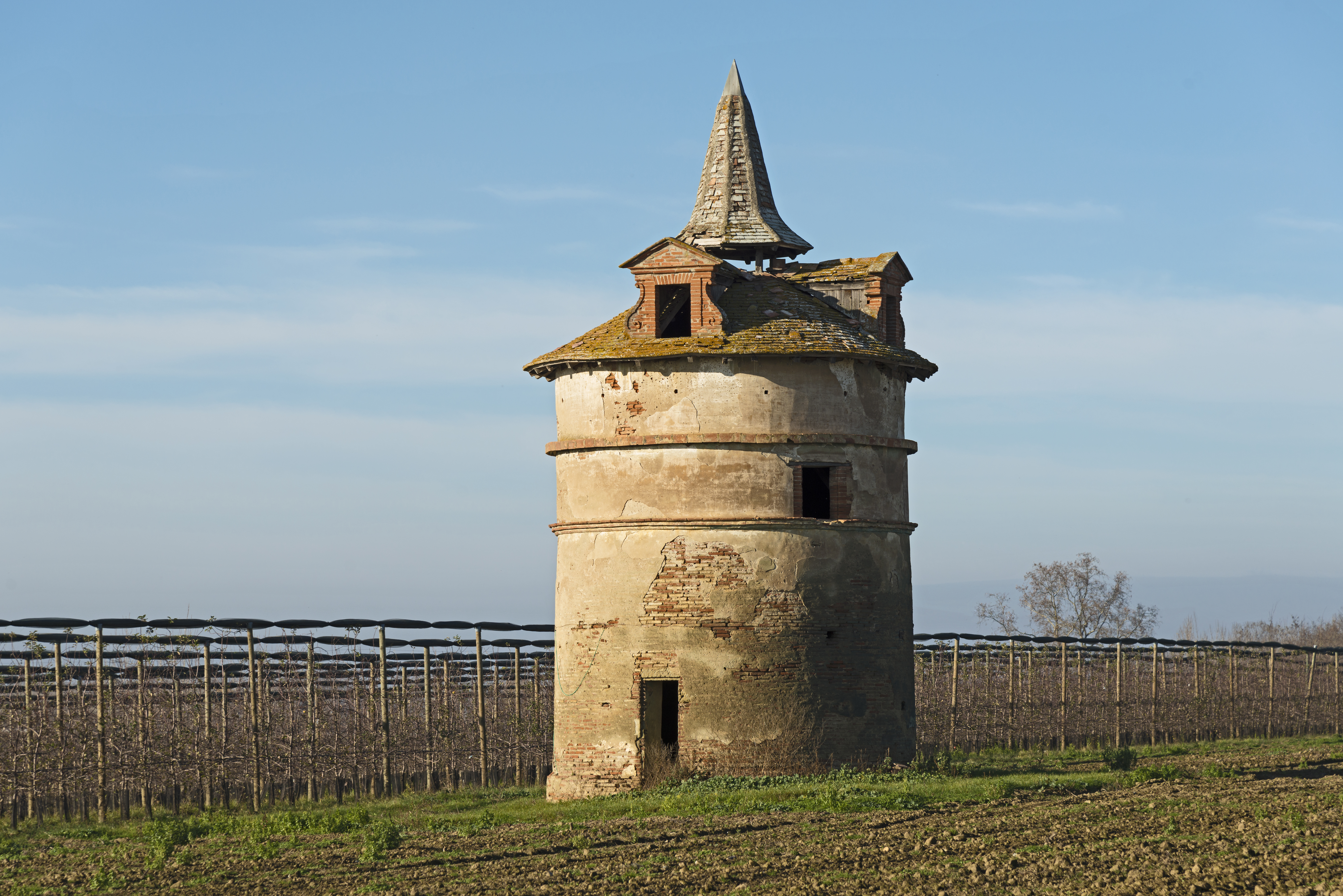
The dovecote of St. Cry

== See also ==
- Communes of the Tarn-et-Garonne department
- André Abbal
