= Blockade of La Rochelle =

In 1621

Blockade of La Rochelle (1621–1622)
- Part of the Huguenot rebellions
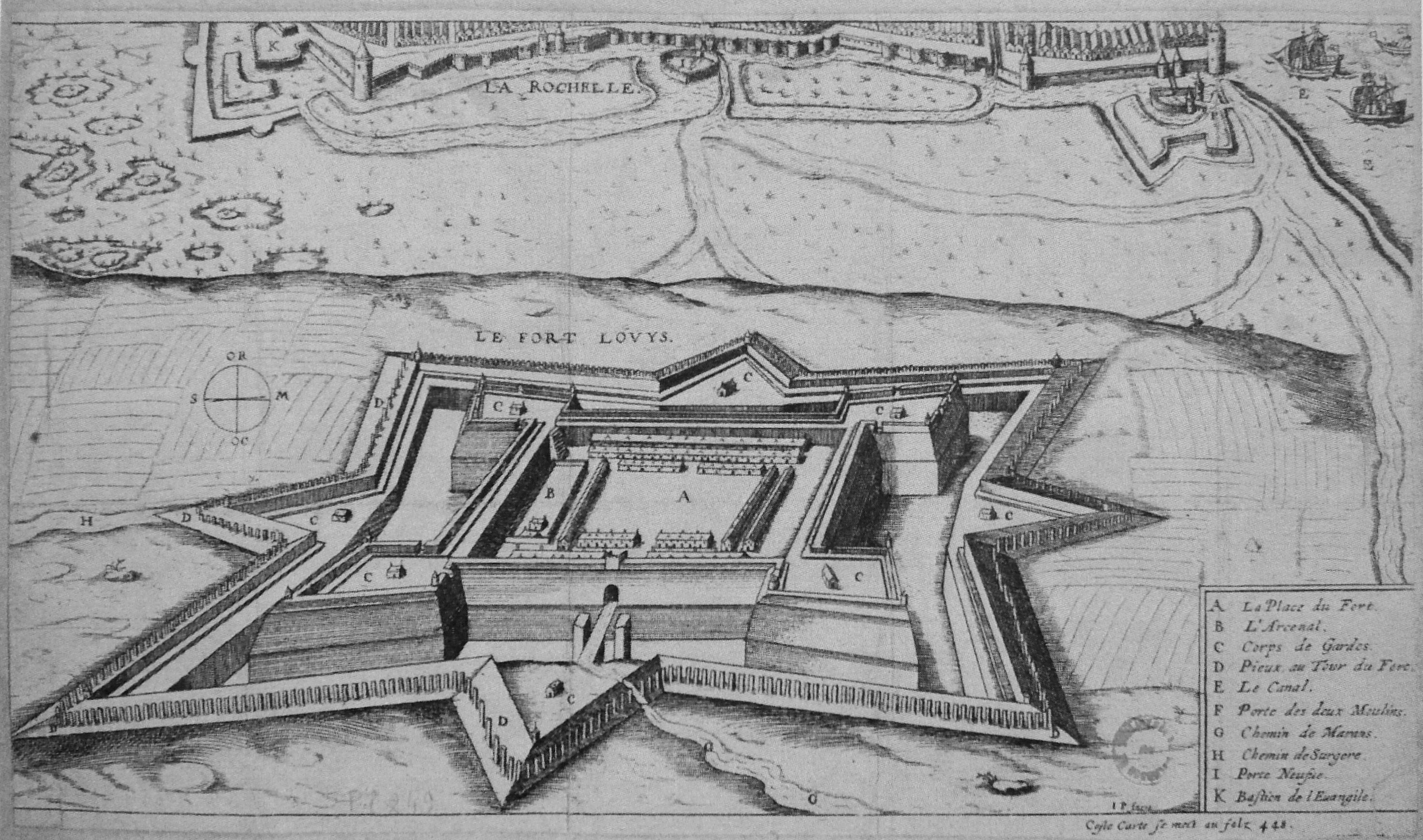
- Fort Louis was constructed just outside the walls of La Rochelle during the 1621-1622 blockade.
Date	1621–1622
Location	La Rochelle
Result	Stalemate

Belligerents
France	Huguenots

Commanders and leaders
Louis XIII; Duke of Epernon	Jean Guiton

The Blockade of La Rochelle (French: Blocus de La Rochelle) took place in 1621-1622 during the repression of the Huguenot rebellion by the French king Louis XIII.

In June 1621, Louis XIII besieged and captured Saint-Jean d'Angély, a strategic city controlling the approaches to the Huguenot stronghold of La Rochelle. Louis XIII chose however to move south with his main force for the Siege of Montauban.

== Blockade ==
Meanwhile, Louis XIII ordered the Duke of Épernon to blockade La Rochelle by sea as well as by land. On the sea, however, efforts were ineffective, as many small ships could easily go through ships of the Royal Navy and the Huguenots generally had mastery of the sea. At one point they attacked the harbour of Brouage and attempted to block it by sinking ships filled with stones at its entrance.

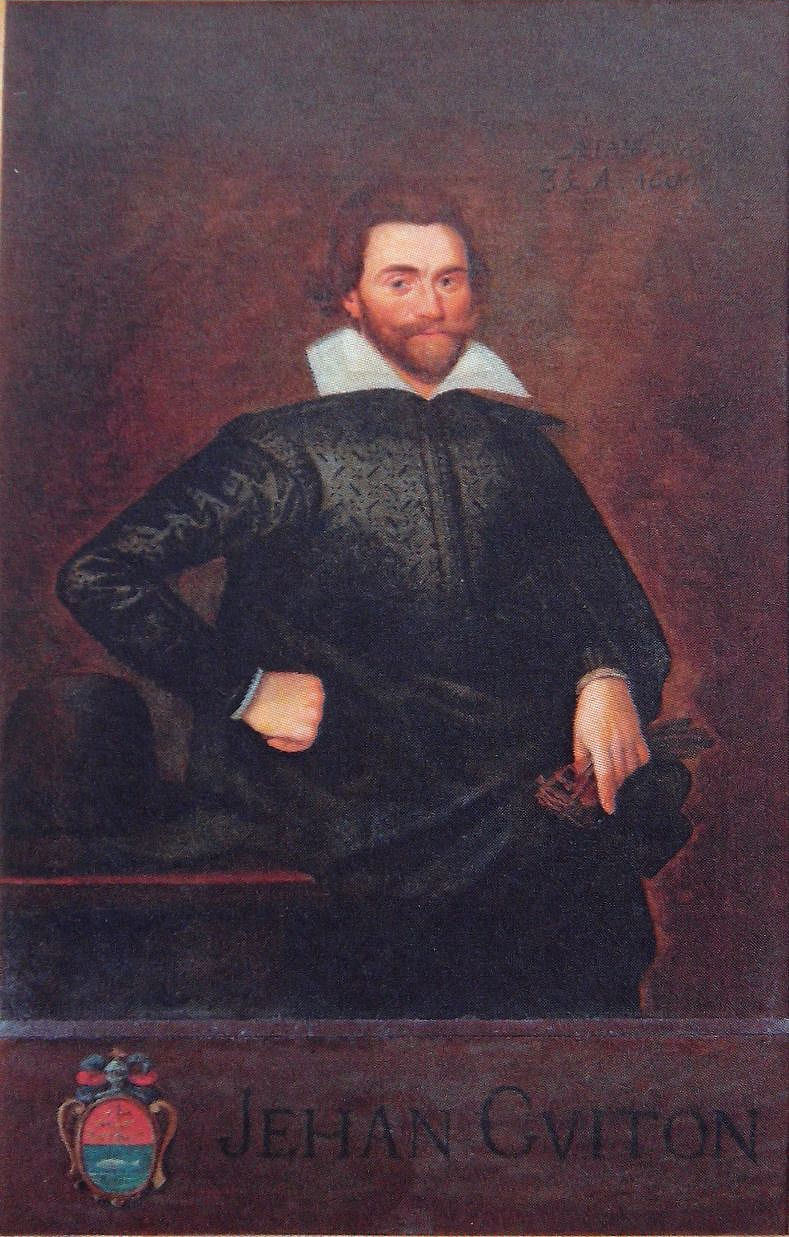
Jean Guiton.

In July 1621, d'Épernon established his headquarters on land in La Jarrie, in the vicinity of La Rochelle. In August, the shipowner Jean Guiton was named by the City Council as Admiral of the fleet of La Rochelle, with 16 sails and 90 cannons.

The fleet of La Rochelle under Guiton made at least four sorties against the Royal fleet, commanded by the Count of Soissons, the Duke of Guise, M. de Saint-Luc and Isaac de Razilly, and somewhat managed to hold its own.

In October, Razilly, leading a French fleet of 13 ships with 124 cannons, stationed seaward in the Pertuis Breton, and Jean Guiton managed to force them to disengage in two encounters on 6 October. Jean Guiton then managed to capture the Island of Oléron.

On 6 November Jean Guiton attacked Brouage, where 25 royal ships were stationed, and blocked the entrance of the harbour by sinking ships in it.

The Huguenots met with defeat however when Soubise was vanquished by Royal troops at the Riez marches on 16 April 1622.

By that time the nearby Siege of Royan was also going on. The blockade of La Rochelle was strengthened under the leadership of the Count of Soissons. He started the building of the Fort Louis just outside La Rochelle in order to obtain a commanding position over the approaches to La Rochelle.

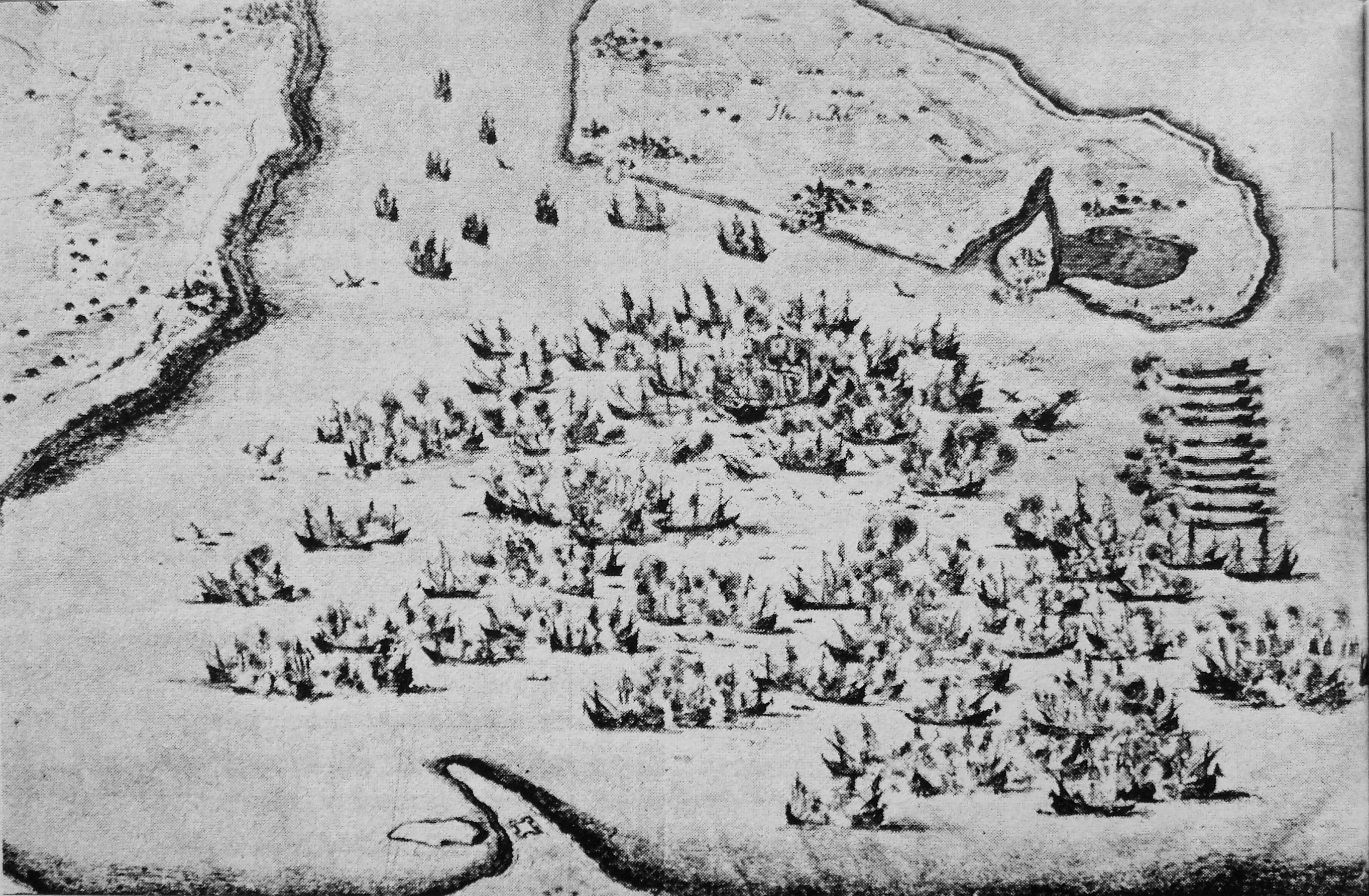
The Naval battle of Saint-Martin-de-Ré in front of Île de Ré in October 1622, in which the fleet of La Rochelle fought against Charles de Guise.

Another major encounter was the Naval battle of Saint-Martin-de-Ré in October 1622. As the conflict lengthened into a stalemate, however, the King and the Huguenots agreed to the 1622 Treaty of Montpellier, which maintained Huguenot privileges. Although La Rochelle demanded the destruction of Fort Louis, Louis XIII temporized and managed to maintain it.

This constant threat to the city would be instrumental in encouraging later conflicts, especially the Capture of Ré island by Royal troops in 1625, and the 1627-1628 Siege of La Rochelle.

== See also ==
- French Wars of Religion
- Huguenot rebellions
