= Jacques Rouxel de Grancey =

French military officer and Marshal of France

Jacques Rouxel Count of Grancey and Médavy
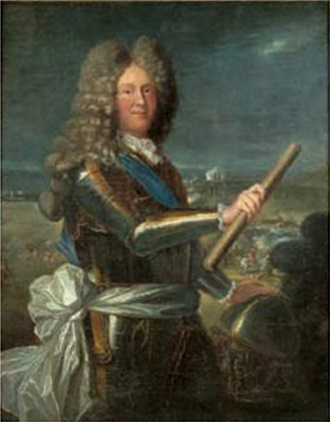
- Born: 7 July 1603
- Died: 20 November 1680 (aged 77); Paris
- Spouse(s): Catherine de Monchy d'Hocquincourt (m. 1624; died 1638) Charlotte de Mornay (died 1680)
- Military career
- Allegiance: France
- Rank: Marshal of France
- Conflicts: Wars of Religion; Thirty Years' War
- Awards: Chevalier de Saint Esprit

Jacques Rouxel, Count of Grancey and Médavy (7 July 1603 – 20 November 1680) was a French soldier who was raised to the dignity of Marshal of France in 1651.

== Early life ==
Jacques was the sixth of thirteen children, and the third son, of Pierre I Rouxel, Baron de Médavy (1562–1617), and Charlotte de Hautemer, Countess of Grancey. His younger brother was Archbishop François IV Rouxel de Médavy de Grancey. His father was a Counselor to the King in his Councils of State, Lieutenant in Normandy, Mestre de camp, Governor of Argentan. His mother was the daughter of Guillaume de Hautemer, Marshal de Fervaques.

While reportedly destined for an ecclesiastical career, he instead became a soldier.

== Career ==
He served King Louis XIII in all his wars, both in Languedoc and in Piedmont, Flanders and Lorraine.

He made his debut at the Siege of Caen, served as a volunteer during the Huguenot rebellions in the Battle of Ponts-de-Cé, and at the Sieges of Saint-Jean-d'Angély, Clairac, Montauban, Montpellier and La Rochelle, all in 1621.

He crossed into Piedmont in 1629, took part in the Battle of Pas-de-Suze, and went to the aid of Casale with his regiment. He then served in Lorraine. He was found at the Siege of Trier, at the Battle of Yvoy, and at the Siege of Saverne, where he was wounded.

He forced General de Mercy to lift the Siege of Héricourt and had his knee shattered at the Siege of Saint-Hippolyte. He was wounded again at the battle of Rey against Baron de Sécy.

In 1636, the King gave him the Government of Montbéliard and, in 1644, that of Gravelines after the Siege of Gravelines. He became Lieutenant-general in 1644, he received the baton of Marshal of France in January 1651. In 1650, at the height of the troubles of the Fronde, Mazarin announced a promotion of marshals, and let the names of four Lieutenant-generals circulate in advance for whom he intended this honor. Grancey, who had real titles, was not one of them. He then left Paris with a lot of noise to retire to his government, saying aloud that the Spanish would be very happy to have Gravelines back. In this time of disorder, such a thing was possible; the Cardinal was afraid and sent the baton to Grancey. The Spanish were indeed very attached to Gravelines. They made enormous sacrifices, in 1652, to put it back in their power. Grancey's regiment defended the place well and only surrendered it on honorable terms.

He returned to Piedmont where he defeated the Spanish at the Battle of La Roquette and then gave up attacking the Waldensians, following the intercession of Pastor Jean Léger with Captain Laurent de l'Aube de Corcelles, which forced the Marquess of Pianezza to initiate repression himself in 1655, the Waldensian Easter. The King made him a Knight of the Order of the Holy Spirit and named him Governor of Thionville on 1 January 1662.

== Personal life ==
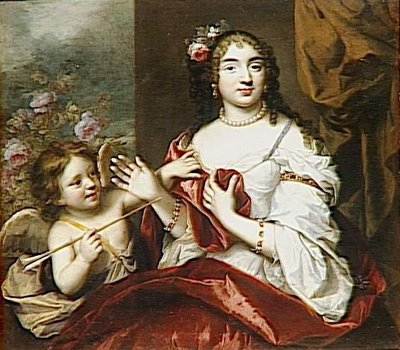
Portrait of his daughter, Marie-Louise Rouxel de Médavy, by Claude Lefèbvre, between 1663 and 1665

In 1624, he married Catherine de Monchy d'Hocquincourt (c. 1603–1638), a sister of Marshal Charles de Monchy d'Hocquincourt. Before her death in 1638, they were the parents of nine children, including:

- Pierre II Rouxel de Médavy (1626–1704), Count of Grancey, Colonel of the Grancey regiment from 1653 to 1659.
- François-Bénédict de Rouxel (1635–1679) Marquess of Grancey, Colonel of the Grancey regiment from 1659 to 1675; Lieutenant général des Armées navales.
- Hardouin Rouxel de Médavy de Grancey (d. 1706), a priest.

After the death of his first wife in 1638, he married Charlotte de Mornay (c. 1620–1694). Together, they were the parents of another twelve children, including:

- Marie-Louise Rouxel de Médavy (1648–1728), who married her cousin Joseph de Rouxel de Médavy, Count of Marcy, in 1665.
- Marie-Madeleine de Médavy de Grancey (1649–1727), the Abbess of the Almenêches Abbey.
- Louise-Elisabeth de Rouxel de Médavy (1653–1711), a lady-in-waiting of Marie Louise d'Orléans, the Queen consort of Spain.

Jacques died in Paris on 20 November 1680 and was buried in the Capuchin convent.

=== Descendants ===
Through his son Pierre II, he was a grandfather of Jacques Eléonor Rouxel de Grancey (1655–1725), who was also made a Marshal of France in 1724, just before his death, and Louis-François Rouxel de Grancey.
