= Siege of Saint-Jean-d'Angély (1621) =

17th Century battle in France

- Part of the Huguenot rebellions
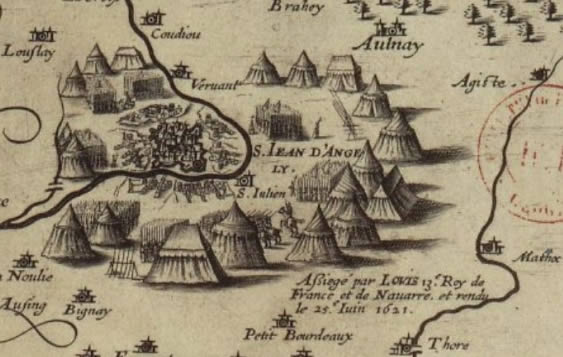
- Siege of Saint-Jean-d'Angély, 1621
Date	30 May – 24 June 1621
Location	Saint-Jean-d'Angély 45.9466°N 0.5294°W
Result	Royalist victory

Belligerents
France	Huguenots

Commanders and leaders
Louis XIII	Duc de Soubise

The siege of Saint-Jean-d'Angély (French: siège de Saint-Jean-d'Angély) was a siege (military blockade), accomplished by the young French king Louis XIII in 1621, against the Protestant stronghold of Saint-Jean-d'Angély led by Rohan's brother Benjamin de Rohan, duc de Soubise. Saint-Jean-d'Angély was a strategic city controlling the approach to the Huguenot stronghold of La Rochelle.

The city was captured after only 26 days, on 24 June 1621.

Louis XIII then sent a small army for the Blockade of La Rochelle, and continued to the south to lead the siege of Montauban, which he abandoned after 2 months. After a lull, Louis XIII resumed his campaign with the siege of Montpellier, which ended in stalemate, leading to the 1622 peace of Montpellier, which temporarily confirmed the right of the Huguenots in France.

== See also ==
- Huguenot rebellions
