= Naval battle of Saint-Martin-de-Ré =

1622 naval battle

Coordinates: 46.215°N 1.366°W

Naval battle of Saint-Martin-de-Ré (Bataille navale de Saint-Martin-de-Ré)
- Part of the Huguenot rebellions
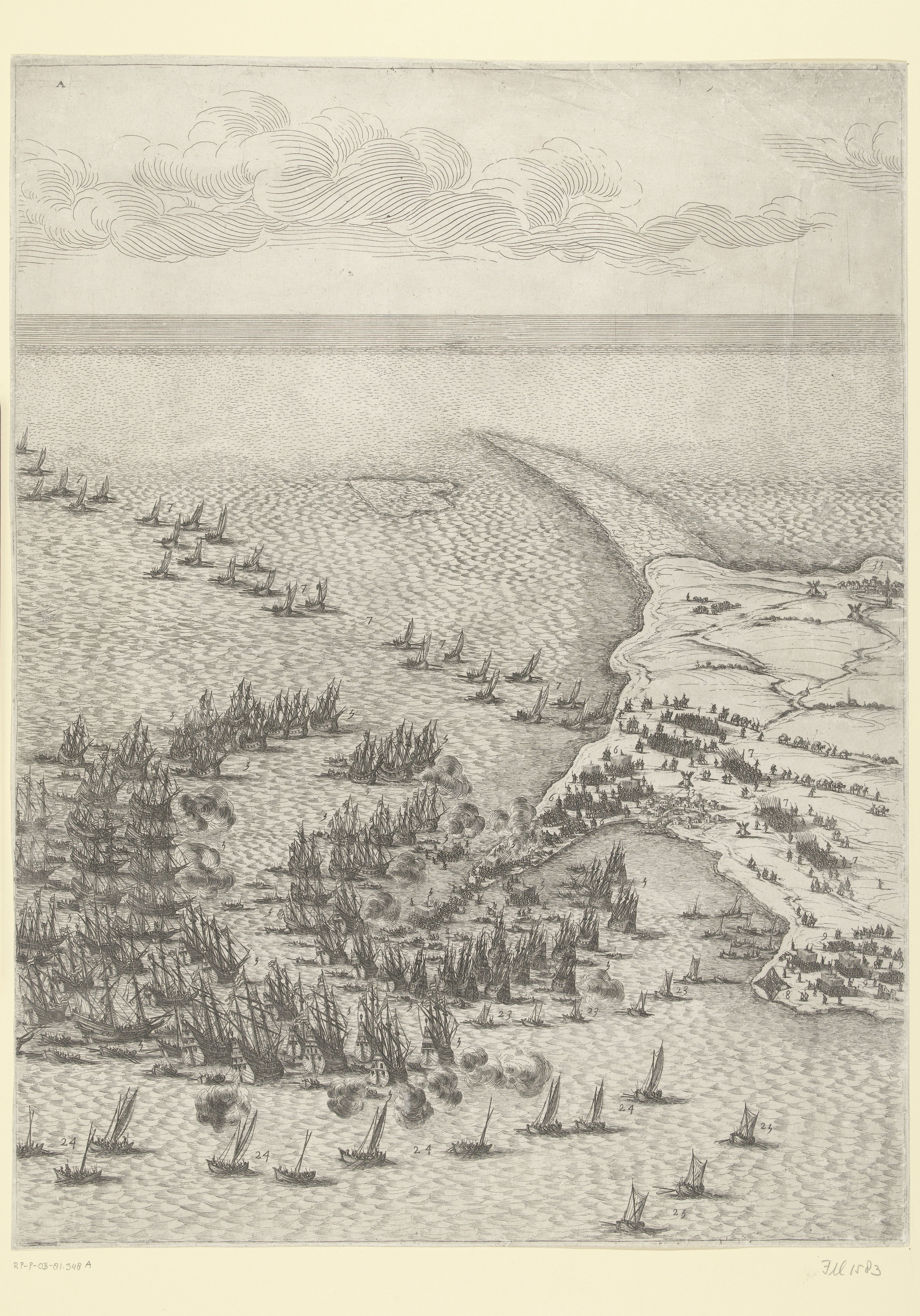
- The naval battle in front of Île de Ré in 1622, in which the fleet of La Rochelle fought against Charles de Guise.
| Date | 27 October 1622 |
| Location | Île de Ré |
| Result | Inconclusive |

Belligerents
| Francd | La Rochelle; Huguenots |

Commanders and leaders
| Louis XIII; Charles de Guise | Jean Guiton |

Strength
| 72 warships | 56 smaller warships |

The Naval battle of Saint-Martin-de-Ré (French:Bataille navale de Saint-Martin-de-Ré) took place on 27 October 1622, between the Huguenot fleet of La Rochelle under Jean Guiton, and a Royal fleet under Charles de Guise.

Under Henry IV the city had enjoyed a certain freedom and prosperity until the 1620s, but the city entered in conflict with the central authority of King Louis XIII with the Huguenot rebellion of 1622. Louis XIII sent a small army for a Blockade of La Rochelle in 1621 and 1622.

A fleet from La Rochelle fought a much larger royal fleet under the Charles de Guise in front of Saint-Martin-de-Ré, and managed to fight to a standstill on 27 October 1622. The battle lasted two hours, and as many as 20,000 cannon shots were exchanged, but the encounter remained inconclusive.

A peace had been signed a few days earlier on 19 October 1622, the Peace of Montpellier, which encouraged the people of La Rochelle to end hostilities. Through the Peace of Montpellier, the fortifications of Montauban and La Rochelle could remain in place, although the fortress of Montpellier had to be razed.

Conflicts would soon resume with the upraisal of the Huguenot leader Soubise together with La Rochelle against Royal authority in 1625, leading to the Capture of Ré island by Royal forces that year, and of course with the major Siege of La Rochelle in 1627-1628.
