= Battle of Blavet =

1625 battle

Battle of Blavet (1625)
- Part of The Huguenot rebellions
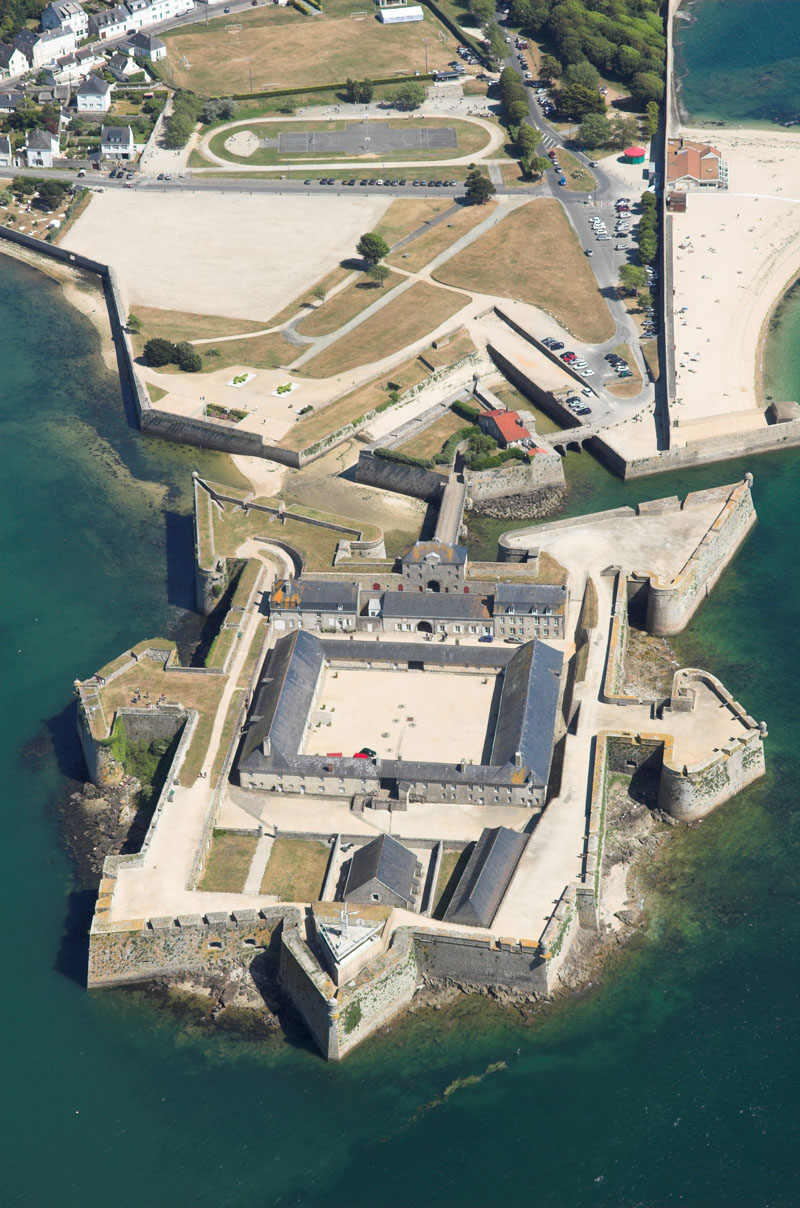
- The Blavet harbour ("Port du Blavet"), modern Port-Louis, in which Soubise seized the Royal fleet.
Date	17 January 1625
Location	Blavet 47.7072°N 3.3519°W
Result	Huguenot victory

Belligerents
France	Huguenot

Commanders and leaders
Duke of Nevers; Duke of Vendôme	Benjamin de Rohan

Strength
6 great warships	12 small warships 300 soldiers 100 sailors

The Battle of Blavet (French: Bataille du Blavet) was an encounter between the Huguenot forces of Soubise and a French fleet under the Duke of Nevers in Blavet harbour (Port de Blavet, modern Port-Louis), Brittany in January 1625, triggering the Second Huguenot rebellion against the Crown of France.

== Background ==
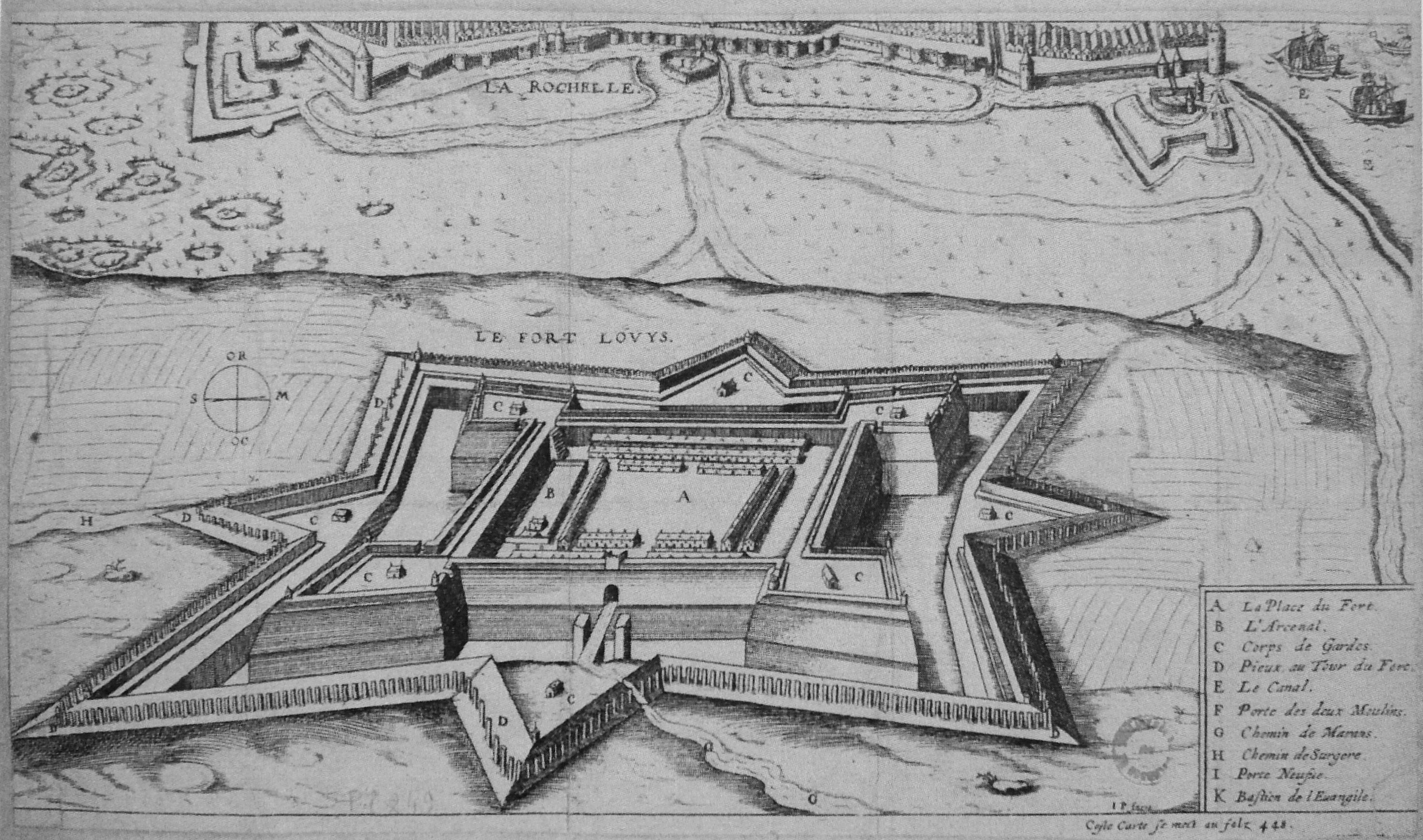
The continued construction of Fort Louis under the walls of La Rochelle was a cause of tension.

An important Huguenot rebellion against the pro-Catholic King of France Louis XIII had taken place a few years before, in 1621–1622, ending in stalemate and in the sealing of the Treaty of Montpellier.

Resentment was breeding on the Huguenot side however as King Louis XIII was not respecting the clauses of the Treaty of Montpellier. Not a single condition is said to have been respected, as Toiras was reinforcing the fortification of Fort Louis, instead of dismantling it, right under the walls of the Huguenot stronghold of La Rochelle, and as a strong fleet was being prepared in Blavet for the eventuality of a siege of the city. The threat of a future siege on the city of La Rochelle was obvious, both to Soubise and the people of La Rochelle. These 6 Royal Ships were intended for use against the Barbary Pirates.

At the same time the Huguenots and Soubise were very defiant of the Crown, displaying intentions to become independent on the model of the Dutch Republic: "If the citizens, abandoned to their guidance, were threatened in their rights and creeds, they would imitate the Dutch in their resistance to Spain, and defy all the power of the monarchy to reduce them." (Mercure de France)

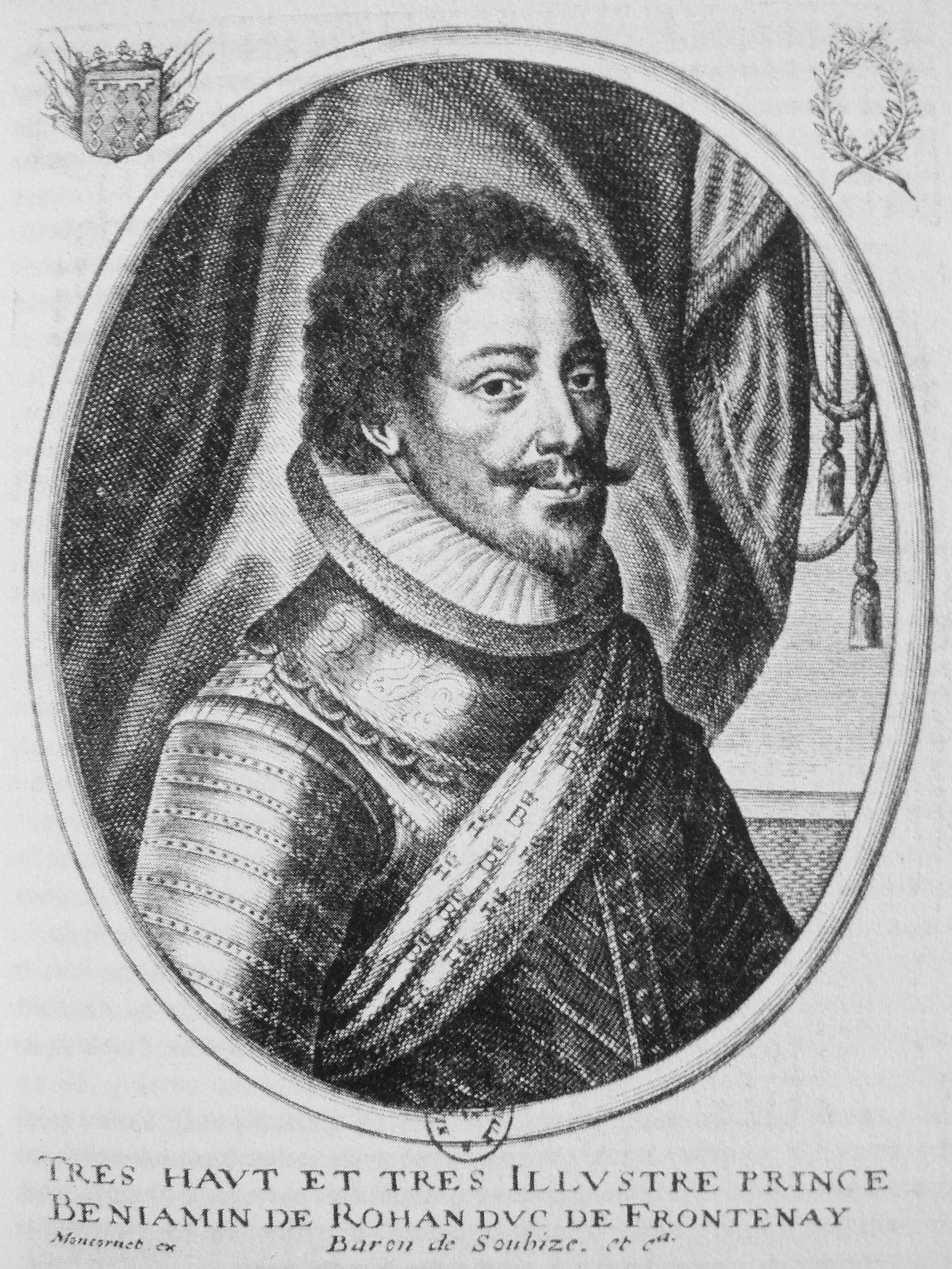
Benjamin de Rohan, duc de Soubise.

A fleet of five warships was being prepared at Blavet, for a future blockade of the city of La Rochelle. Emissaries were sent to Paris to obtain the execution of the Treaty of Montpellier, but in vain. These were the 6 Royal Ships: La Vierge, Saint Basile, Saint François, Saint Jean, Saint Louis de Nevers, Saint Michel (1625)

Soubise resolved to take action. With a few ships which he had prepared at Chef de Baye, near La Rochelle, he set sail, and attacked Blavet in January 1625. He had 12 small boats, 300 well-armed soldiers, and 100 sailors. Six Royal great ships were at anchor, "all well armed with cannon, but lacking men and ammunition".

Soubise captured the fleet by surprise, and became master of the city, including taking possession of La Vierge, the largest known warship of the period: it weighed 500 tons, had 80 bronze cannons, and cost 200,000 crowns to build.

The Duke of Vendôme, Commander of the Province, attempted to block Soubise in the harbour, with heavy chain and batteries. After two weeks however, Soubise managed to break through with his fleet.

Soubise, now in possession of a formidable fleet of 70 ships, then anchored in front of Île de Ré, which he had occupied with his troops.

These events led to a strong reaction from the King, who set up a counter-attack in September 1625, leading to the Capture of Île de Ré, and with Soubise fleeing to England. Soubise would return two years later with a large fleet under the Duke of Buckingham, leading to the final showdown of the Siege of La Rochelle (1627–1628).

== See also ==
- French Wars of Religion
- Huguenot rebellions
