= Siege of Royan =

1622 siege

Siege of Royan (1622)
- Part of the Huguenot rebellions
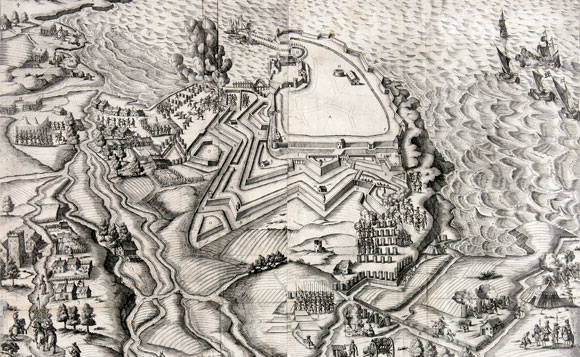
- Siege of Royan in 1622
Date	May 1622
Location	Royan 45.62°N 1.03°W
Result	Royalist victory

Belligerents
France	La Rochelle; Huguenots

Commanders and leaders
Louis XIII	Unknown

The siege of Royan (French: Siège de Royan) was a siege accomplished by the young French king Louis XIII in 1622, against the Protestant stronghold of Royan. This siege followed the siege of Montauban, in which Louis XIII had failed against the Huguenot city.

The siege started at the beginning of May 1622. After six days, despite support from La Rochelle, the city surrendered, the defenders obtaining to withdraw to La Rochelle with weapons and luggage, although they had to leave cannons and ammunition.

== See also ==
- French Wars of Religion
- Huguenot rebellions
