= François de Bonne, Duke of Lesdiguières =

Last Constable of France (1543–1626)

Marshal General François de Bonne
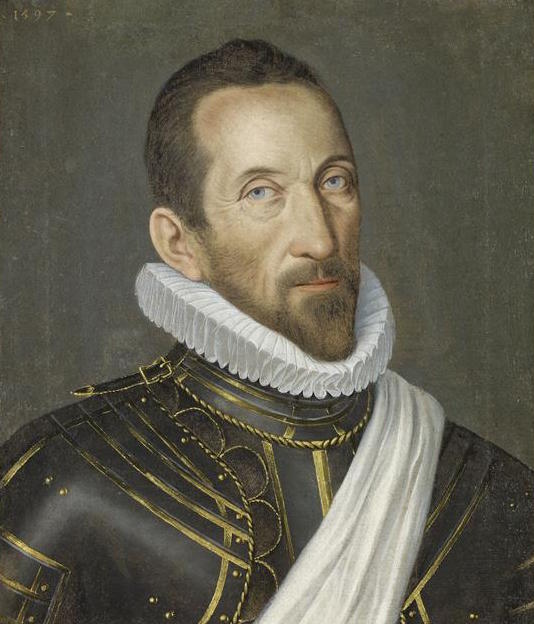

Constable of France
- In office 1622–1626
- Monarch: Louis XIII
- Preceded by: Charles d'Albert
- Succeeded by: Post abolished

Personal details
- Born: 1 April 1543 Saint-Bonnet-en-Champsaur, France
- Died: 21 September 1626 (aged 83) Valence, France

Military service
- Allegiance: France
- Branch/service: French Army
- Rank: Marshal General
- Battles/wars: French Wars of Religion

François de Bonne, duc de Lesdiguières (French pronunciation: [fʁɑ̃swa də bɔn dyk də lediɡjɛʁ], 1 April 1543 – 21 September 1626) was a French soldier of the French Wars of Religion and Constable of France, and one of only six Marshals to have been promoted Marshal General of France.

He was the last Constable to be appointed, the only Huguenot to hold the office, and the only one to rise through the ranks of the French army.

== Early life ==
He was born at Saint-Bonnet-en-Champsaur, to a family of notaries with pretensions to nobility. He was educated at Avignon under a Protestant tutor, and had begun the study of law in Paris when he enlisted in the French army as an archer.

== Military service ==
He served under the lieutenant-general of his native province of Dauphiné, Bertrand de Simiane, baron de Gordes, but when the Huguenots raised troops in Dauphiné Lesdiguières threw in his lot with them, and under his kinsman Antoine Rambaud de Furmeyer, whom he succeeded in 1570, distinguished himself in the mountain warfare that followed by his bold yet prudent handling of troops. He fought at the Battle of Jarnac and the Battle of Moncontour, and was a guest at the wedding of King Henry III of Navarre (later Henry IV of France). Warned of the impending St. Bartholomew's Day massacre he retired hastily to Dauphiné, where he secretly equipped and drilled a determined body of Huguenots, and in 1575, after the execution of Charles du Puy de Montbrun in Grenoble, became the acknowledged leader of the Huguenot resistance in the district with the title of commandant general, confirmed in 1577 by Marshal Doraville, by Henry II, Prince of Condé in 1580, and by Henry of Navarre in 1582.

He seized Gap by a lucky night attack on 3 January 1577, re-established the reformed religion there, and fortified the town. He refused to acquiesce in the treaty of Poitiers (1578) which involved the surrender of Gap, and after two years of fighting secured better terms for the province. Nevertheless, in 1580 he was compelled to hand the place over to Mayenne and to see the fortifications dismantled.

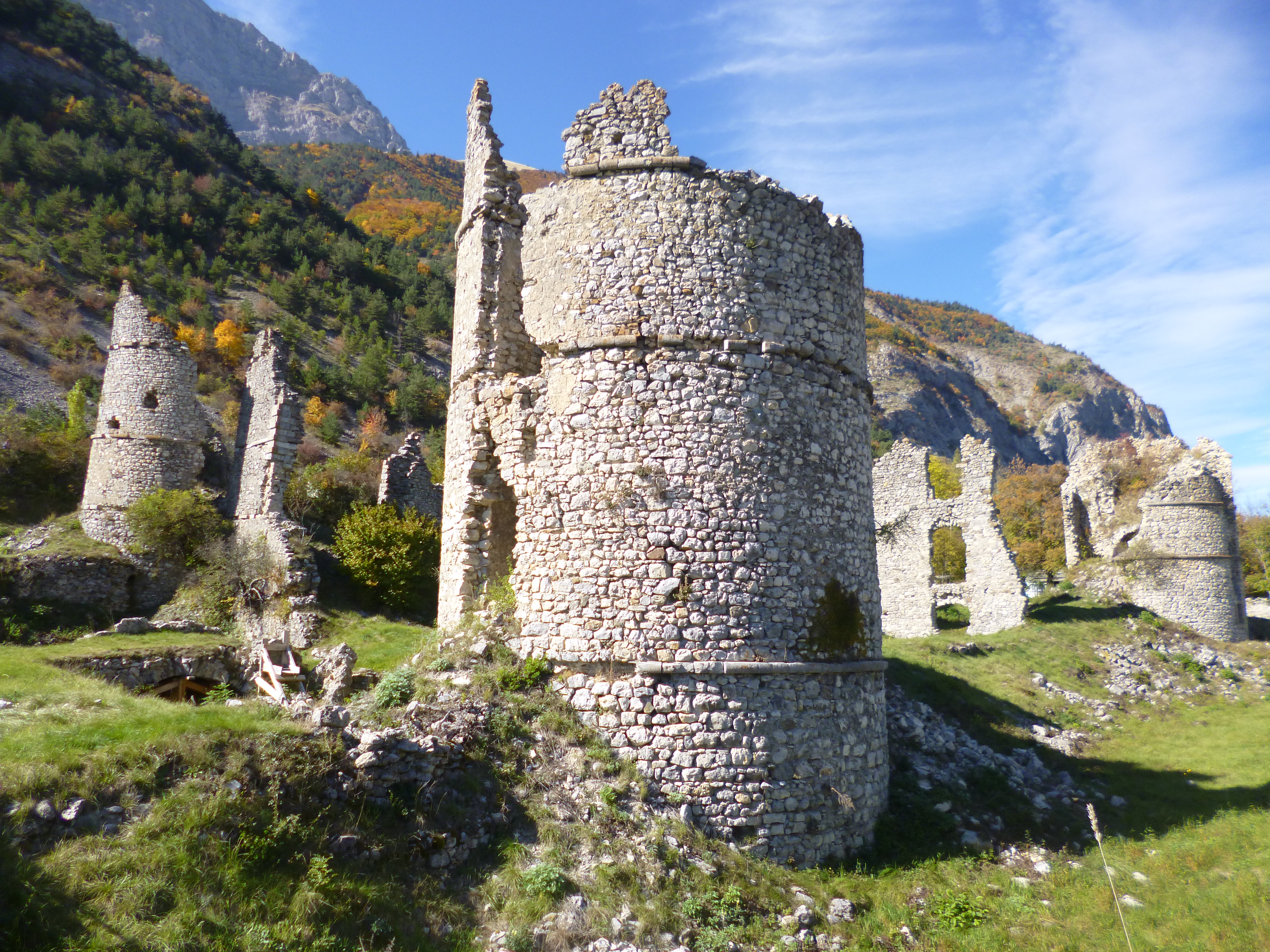
The Castle of François de Bonne, in the hamlet of Lesdiguières (Le Glaizil, France)

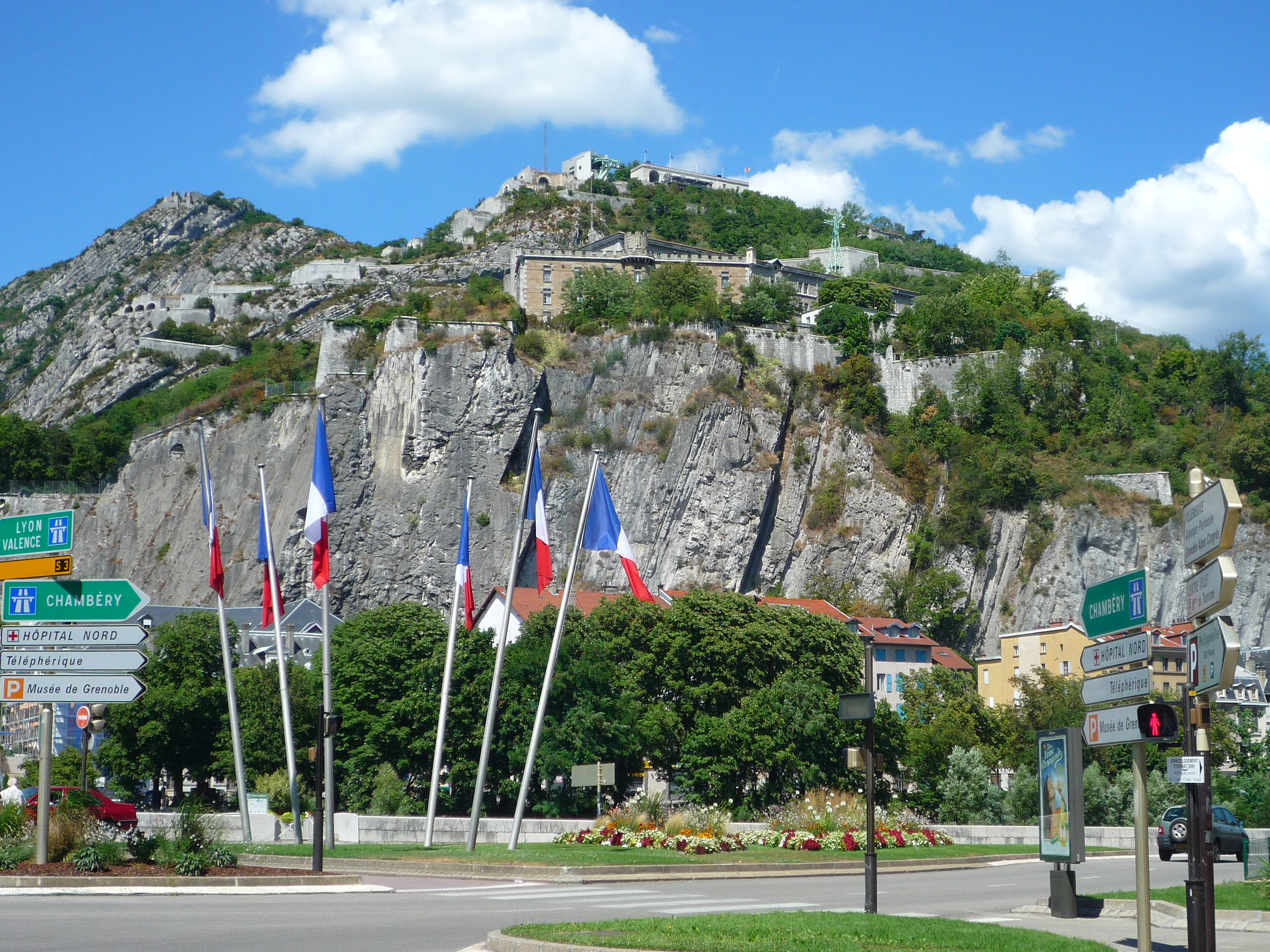
Bastille of Grenoble today

He took up arms for Henry IV in 1585, capturing Chorges, Embrun, Châteauroux and other places, and after the truce of 1588–1589 secured the submission of Dauphiné. In 1590 he overcame the resistance of Grenoble, and was now able to threaten the leaguers and to support the governor of Provence against the raids of Charles Emmanuel I, Duke of Savoy. He defeated the Savoyards at Esparron in April 1591, and began in 1592 the reconquest of the marquessate of Saluzzo which had been seized by Charles Emmanuel. After the seizing of Grenoble in December 1590, he built new walls for the city in 1606 and fortified the hill of the Bastille between 1611 and 1619.

After his defeat of the Spanish allies of Savoy at Salbertrand in June 1593 there was a truce, during which Lesdiguières was occupied in maintaining the royal authority against Épernon in Provence. The war with Savoy proceeded intermittently until 1605, when Henry IV concluded peace, much to the dissatisfaction of Lesdiguières.

== Later life ==
The king regarded his lieutenant's domination in Dauphiné with some distrust, although he was counted among the best of his captains. Nevertheless, he made him a marshal of France in 1609, and ensured the succession to the lieutenant-generalship of Dauphiné, vested in Lesdiguières since 1597, to his son-in-law Charles de Crequy. Sincerely devoted to the throne, Lesdiguières took no part in the intrigues which disturbed the minority of Louis XIII, and he moderated the political claims made by his co-religionists under the terms of the Edict of Nantes. After the death of his first wife, Claudine de Berenger, he married the widow of Ennemond Matel, a Grenoble shopkeeper, who was murdered in 1617. Lesdiguières was then 73, and this lady, Marie Vignon, had long been his mistress. He had two daughters, one of whom, Françoise, married Charles de Crequy.

In 1622 he formally abjured the Protestant faith, his conversion being partly due to the influence of Marie Vignon. He was already a duke and peer of France; he now became constable of France, and received the Order of the Holy Spirit. He had long since lost the confidence of the Huguenots, but he nevertheless helped the Vaudois against the duke of Savoy. He led the Royal troops against the Huguenots in the Siege of Montpellier in 1622 and was key to arranging the Treaty of Montpellier.

Lesdiguières had the qualities of a great general, but circumstances limited him to the mountain warfare of Dauphiné, Provence and Savoy. He had almost unvarying success through sixty years of fighting and Henry IV said he was "rusé comme un renard" (cunning as a fox). His last campaign, fought in alliance with Savoy to drive the Spaniards from the Valtellina, was the least successful of his enterprises.

== Death ==
Lesdiguières died of fever at Valence on 21 September 1626.
