= Le Glaizil =

- Commune
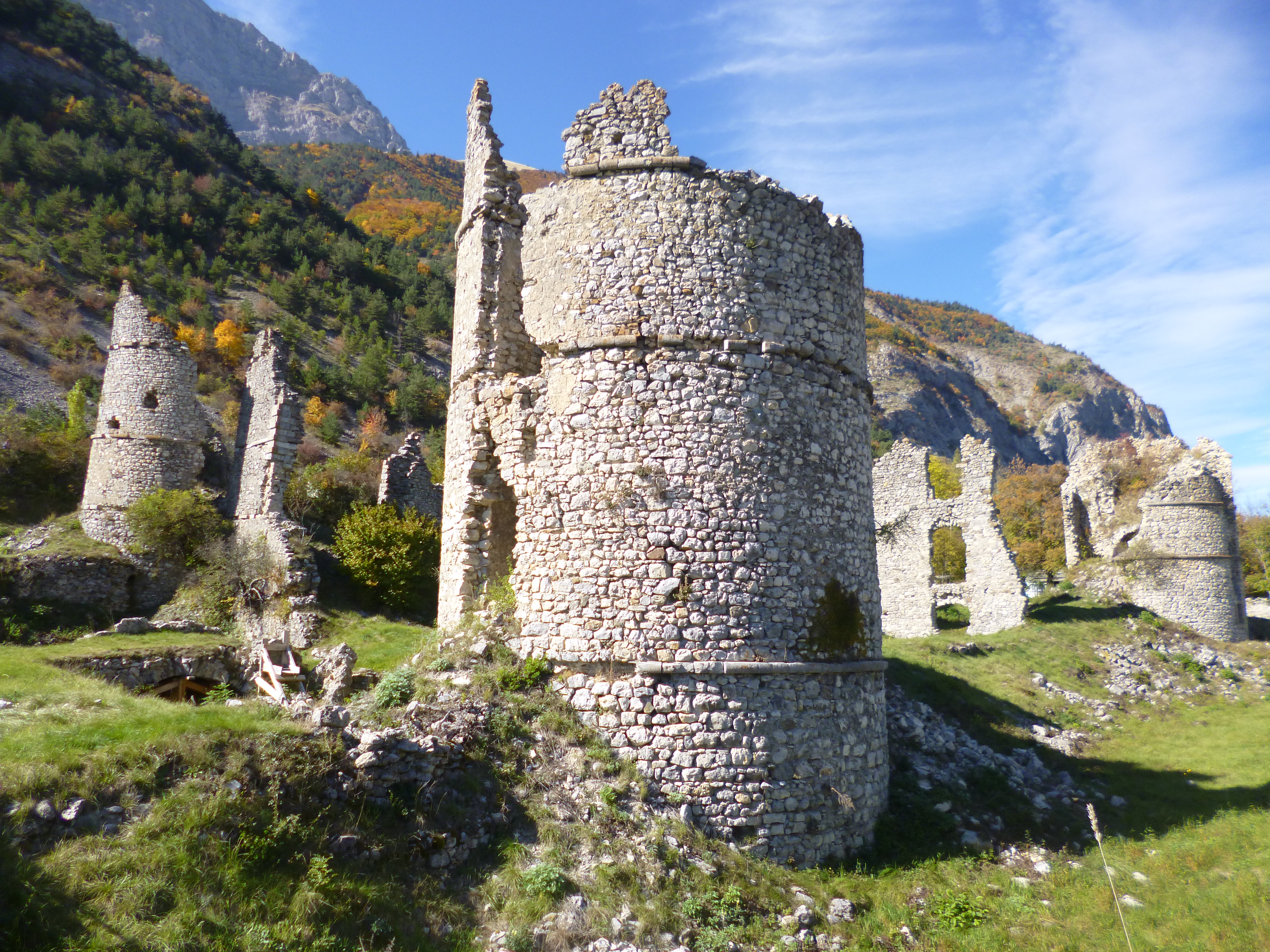
- Ruins of the Castle of Lesdiguières

- Coat of arms
- Location of Le Glaizil
- Location within France Location within Provence-Alpes-Côte d'Azur
- Coordinates: 44°45′16″N 5°59′00″E
- Country: France
- Region: Provence-Alpes-Côte d'Azur
- Department: Hautes-Alpes
- Arrondissement: Gap
- Canton: Saint-Bonnet-en-Champsaur

Government
  - Mayor (2026–32): François Collin
- Area^{1}: 21.93 km^{2} (8.47 sq mi)
- Elevation: 862 m (2,828 ft)
- Highest elevation: 2,570 m (8,430 ft)
- Lowest elevation: 774 m (2,539 ft)
- Population (2023): 178
  - Density: 8.12/km^{2} (21.0/sq mi)
- Time zone: UTC+01:00 (CET)
  - Summer (DST): UTC+02:00 (CEST)
- INSEE/Postal code: 05062 /05800
- ^{1} French Land Register data, which excludes lakes, ponds, glaciers > 1 km^{2} (0.386 sq mi or 247 acres) and river estuaries.

Le Glaizil (French pronunciation: [lə ɡlɛzil]; Occitan: Lo Glaisiu) is a commune in the Hautes-Alpes department in southeastern France. It is famous for hosting the ruins of the castle of the Duke of Lesdiguières, Constable of France in the 17th century.

== Population ==
Historical population
Year	Pop.	±% p.a.
1968	155	—
1975	168	+1.16%
1982	175	+0.58%
1990	169	−0.44%
1999	179	+0.64%
2007	167	−0.86%
2012	180	+1.51%
2017	166	−1.61%
2023	178	+1.17%
Source: INSEE

== Gallery ==
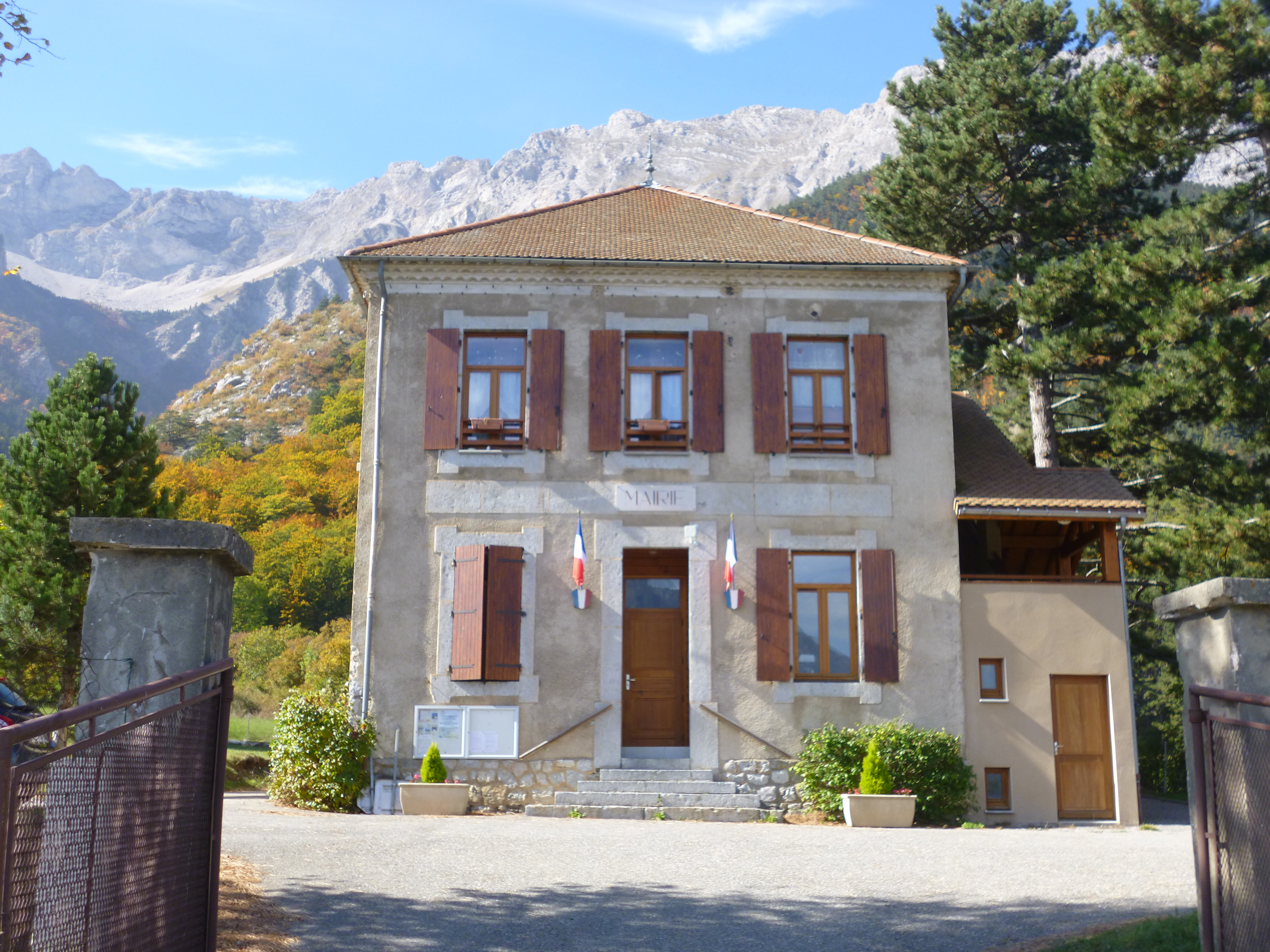
The Town Hall

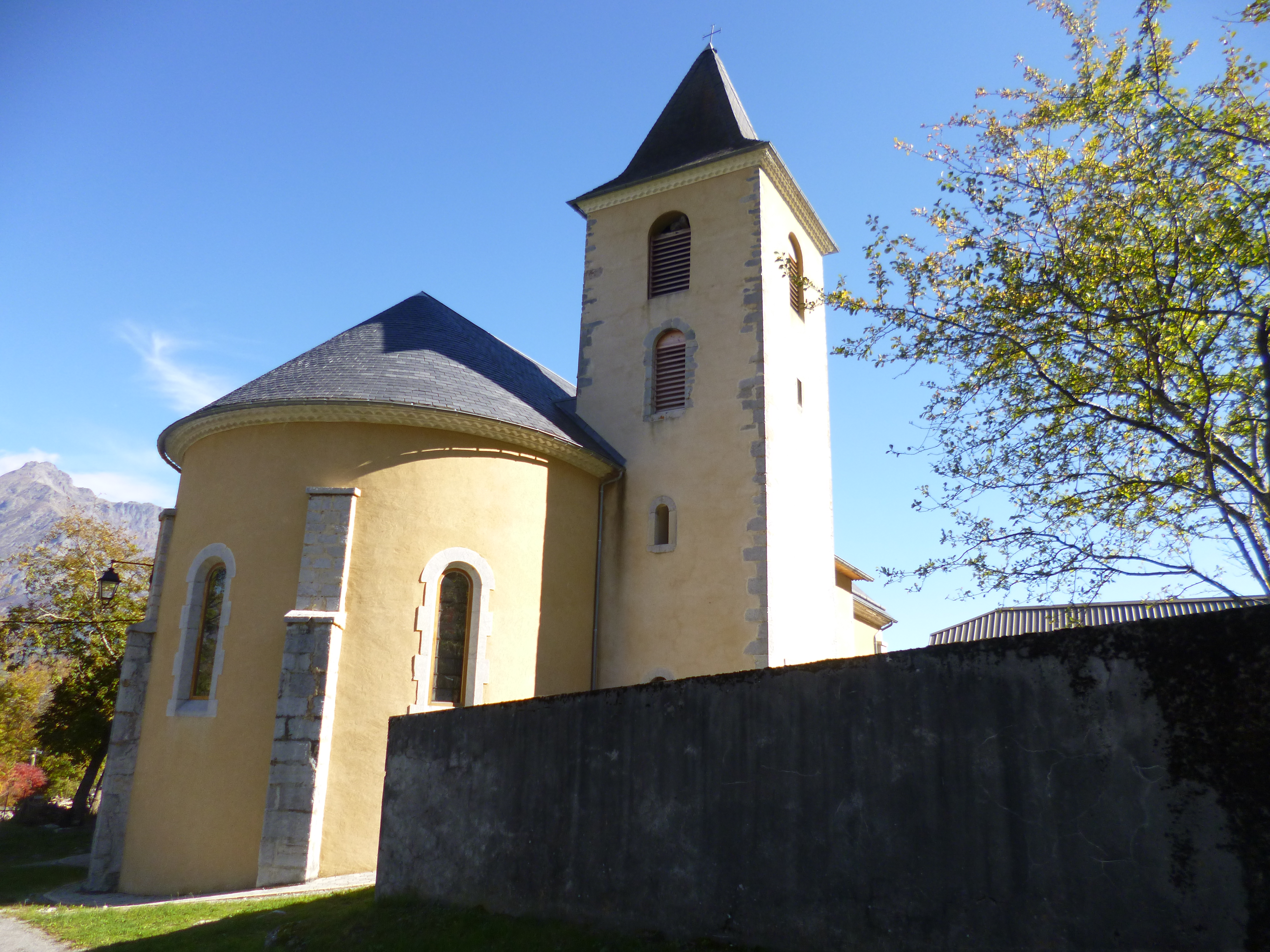
The Church

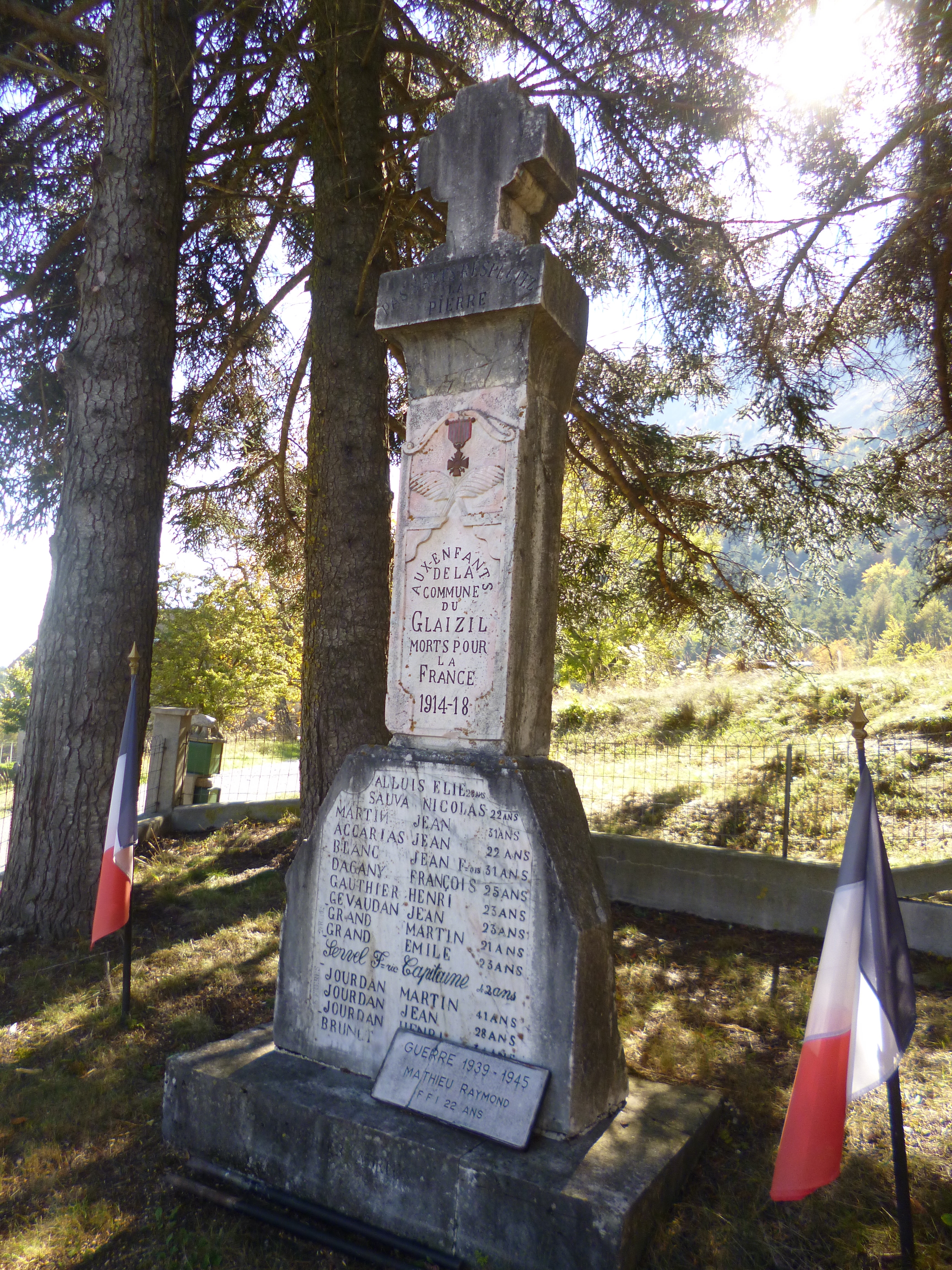
The War Memorial

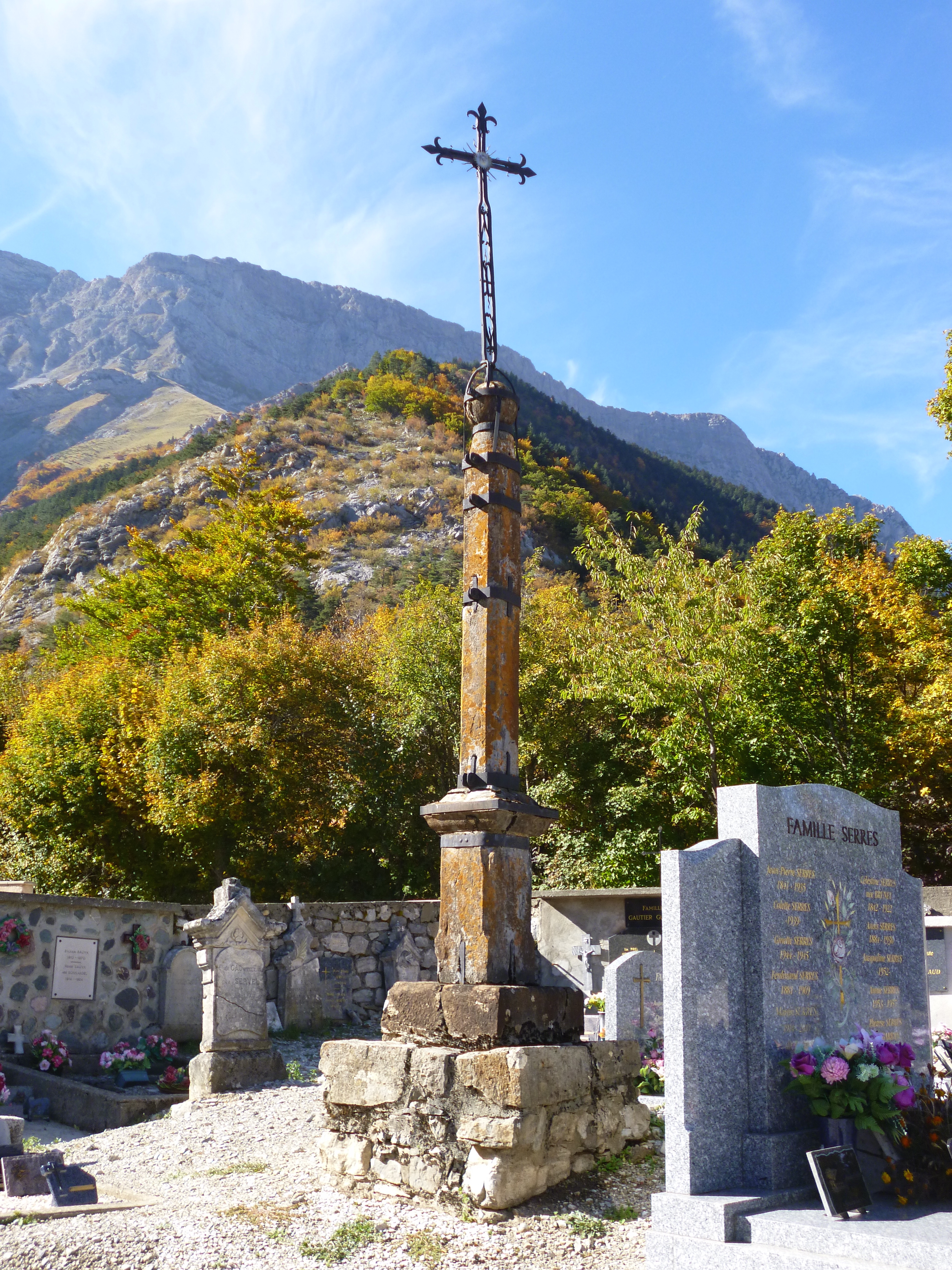
The Cemetery Cross (1771)

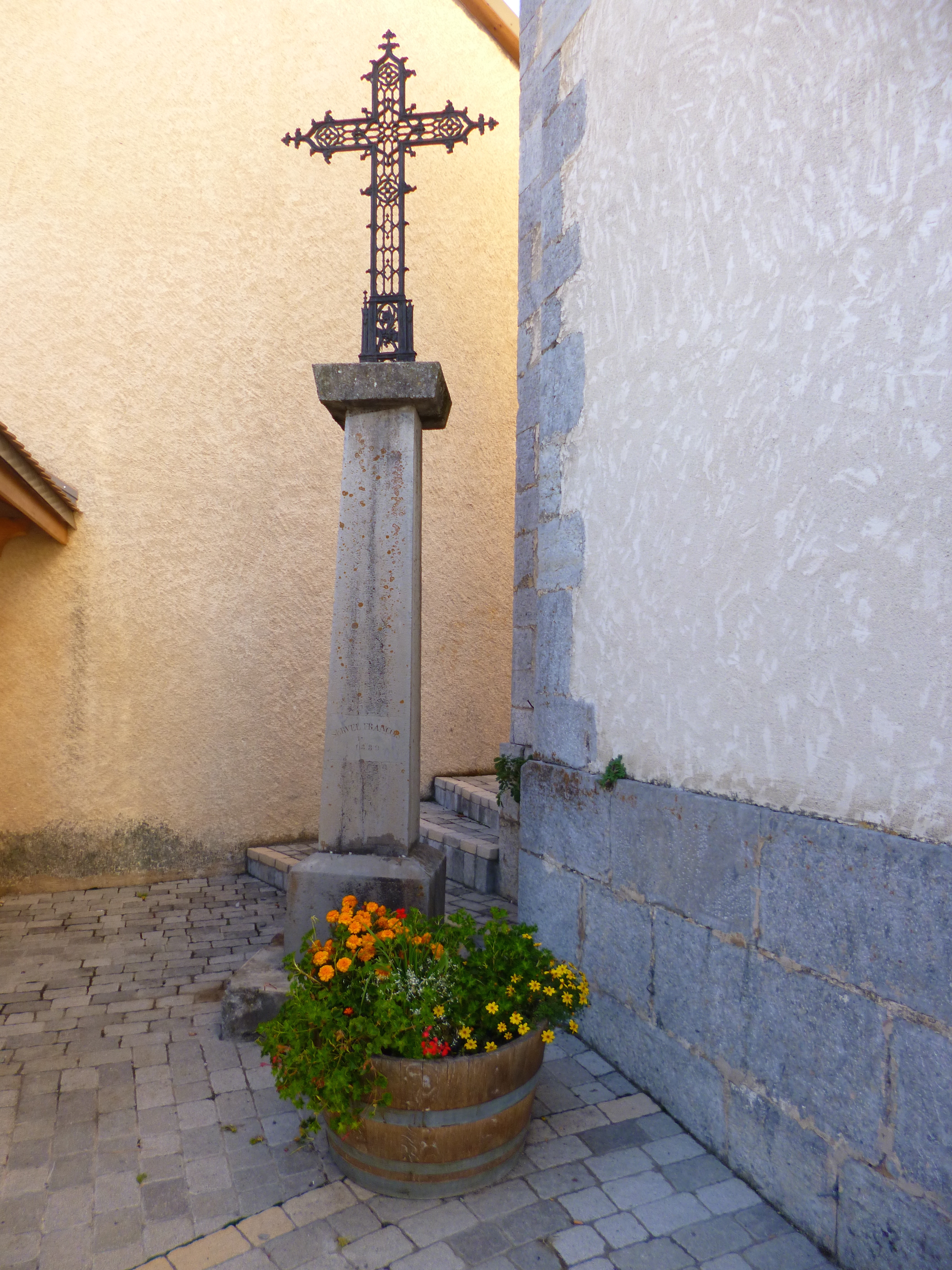
A Cross (1889)

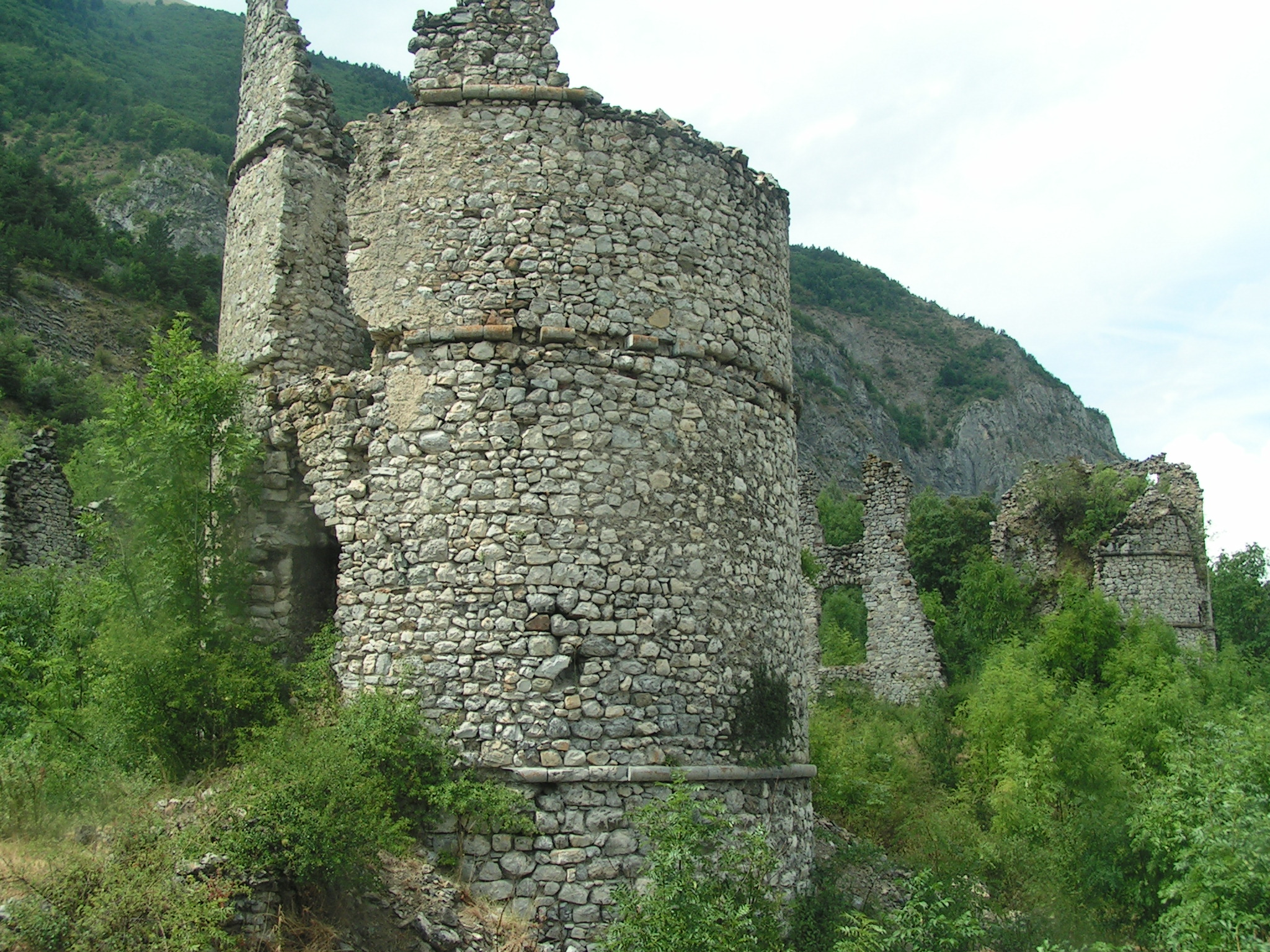
Ruins of the Castle of Lesdiguières

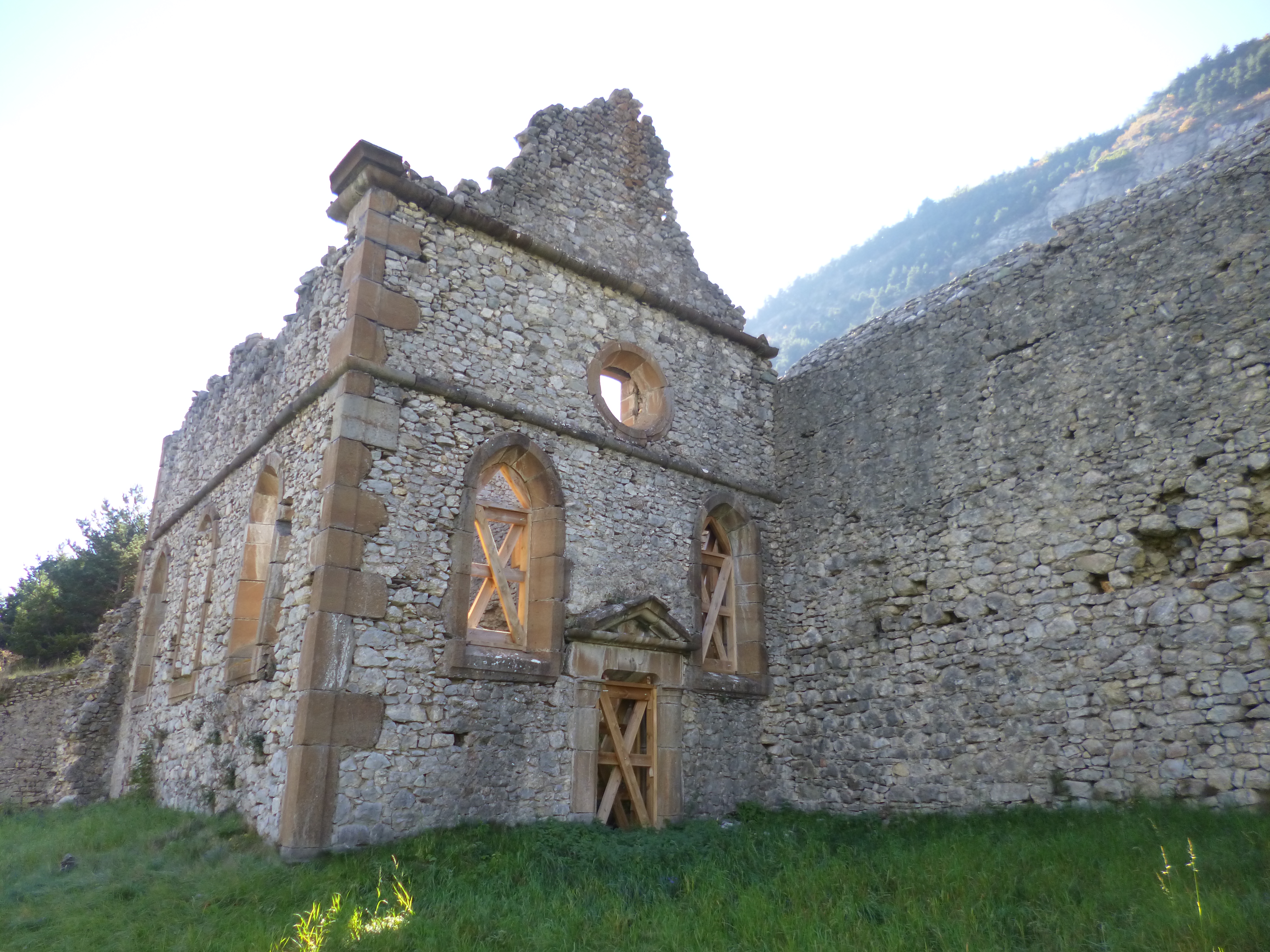
The Chapel of the Castle of Lesdiguières

== See also ==
- Communes of the Hautes-Alpes department
