= Fort Louis (La Rochelle) =

Coordinates: 46.1558°N 1.1721°W

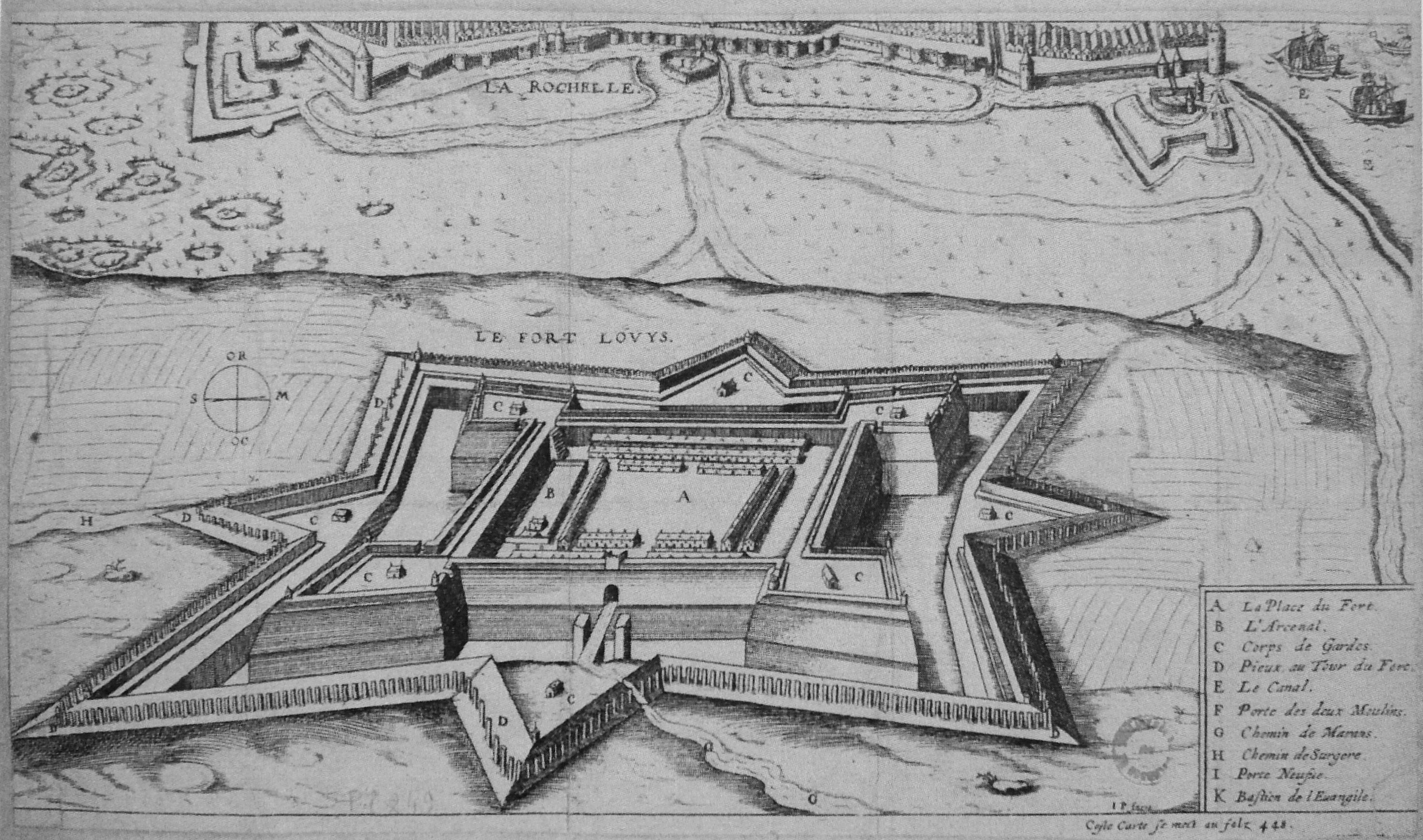
Fort Louis was constructed just outside the walls of La Rochelle during the 1621-1622 blockade.

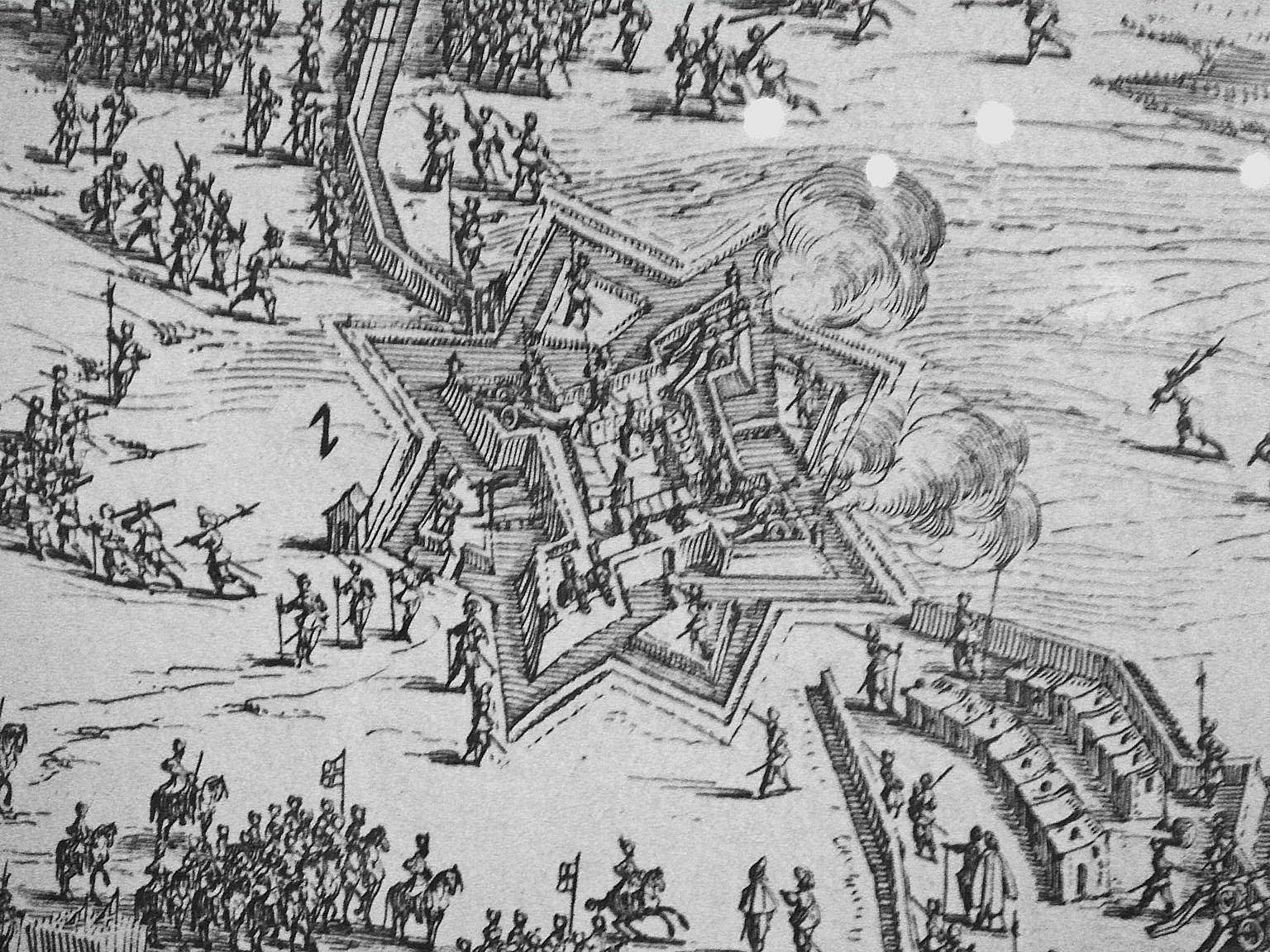
Fort Louis as part of the circumvolution around La Rochelle during the 1627-1628 Siege of La Rochelle.

Fort Louis was a Royal fort built just outside the walls of the Huguenot city in La Rochelle.

The fort was a source of great tension between the Huguenots of La Rochelle and Louis XIII, and was perceived as a real threat to their survival. Marshal Lesdiguieres predicted "Either La Rochelle must take Fort Louis, or the Fort will destroy La Rochelle."

The construction of the fort had been started by the Count of Soissons in 1620 during the first Huguenot rebellion. With the Treaty of Montpellier, Louis XIII had agreed to remove the fort in due time, but he and his Minister Richelieu later temporised and avoided the promised removals despite the requests by La Rochelle.

Fort Louis played a key role in establishing the fortifications around La Rochelle during the 1627-1628 Siege of La Rochelle.
