= Siege of Montauban =

1621 Siege during the Huguenot rebellions

Siege of Montauban (1621)
- Part of the Huguenot rebellions
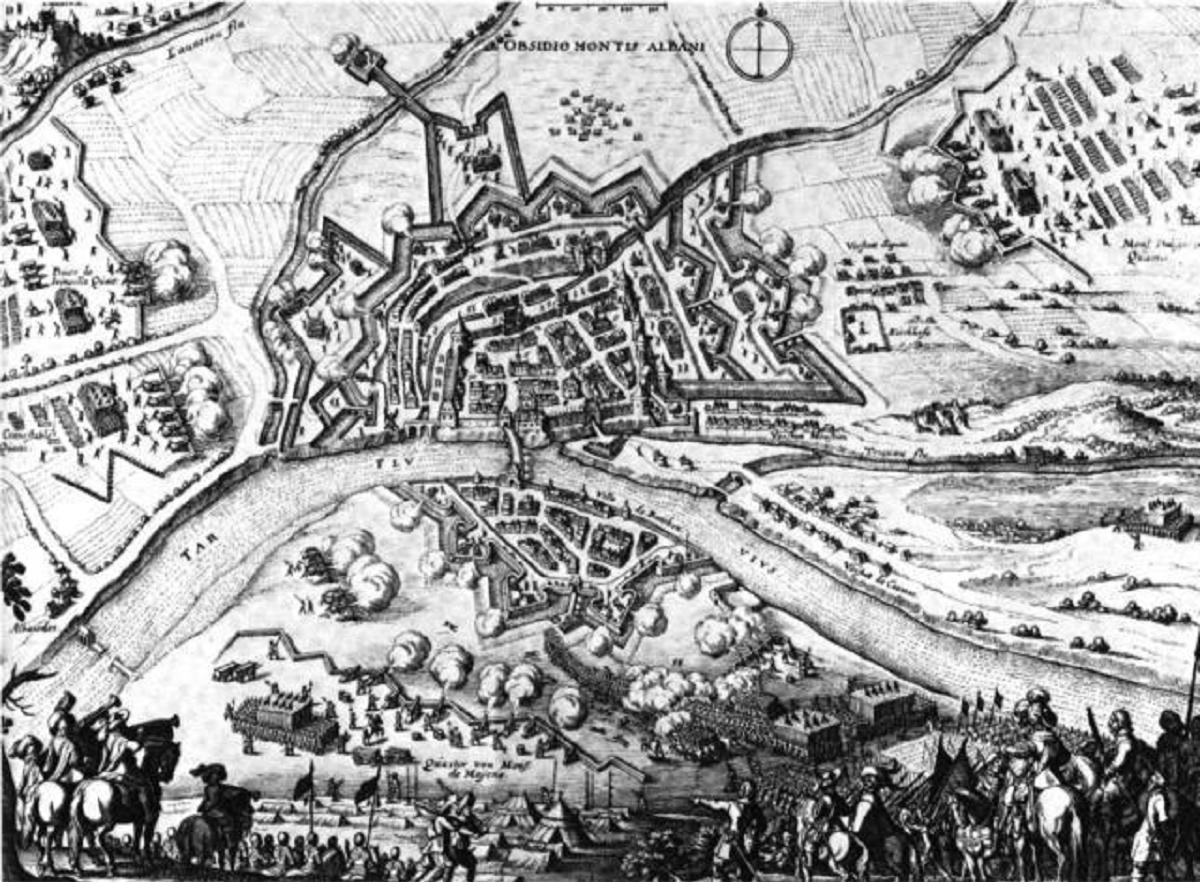
- Louis XIII besieging the Huguenot city of Montauban in 1621.
Date	August–November 1621
Location	Montauban 44.0181°N 1.3558°E
Result	Huguenot victory

Belligerents
France	Huguenot

Commanders and leaders
Louis XIII	Unknown

Strength
25,000	Unknown

The siege of Montauban (French: siège de Montauban) was a siege conducted by the young French king Louis XIII from August to November 1621, against the Protestant stronghold of Montauban. This siege followed the siege of Saint-Jean-d'Angély, in which Louis XIII had succeeded against Rohan's brother Benjamin de Rohan, duc de Soubise.

Despite a strength of about 25,000 men, Louis XIII was unable to capture the city of Montauban, and he had to raise the siege and abandon it after 2 months. After a lull, Louis XIII resumed his campaign with the siege of Montpellier, which ended in stalemate, leading to the 1622 Peace of Montpellier, which temporarily confirmed the right of the Huguenots in France.

The city would be finally captured in 1629, in the Redition of Montauban.

== See also ==
- French Wars of Religion
- Huguenot rebellions
