= Jean Guiton =

French politician and admiral (1585–1654)

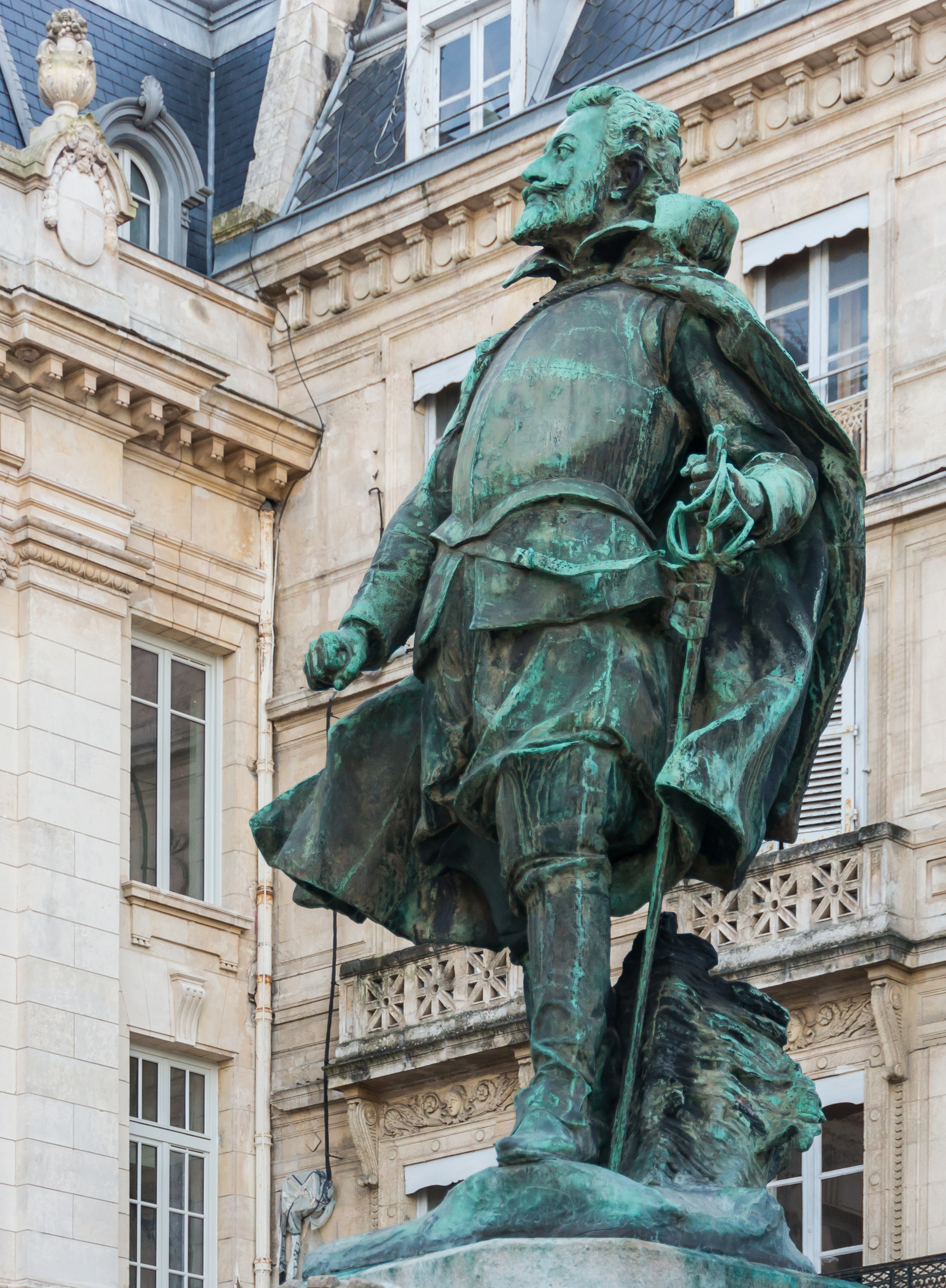
Jean Guiton (1585-1654).

Jean Guiton (2 July 1585 – 15 March 1654) was born in La Rochelle, where he followed the occupation of ship-owner. He became a notable Huguenot leader during the Naval battle of Saint-Martin-de-Ré and siege of La Rochelle.

Having been nominated Admiral of the fleet of La Rochelle, Jean Guiton fought the Naval battle of Saint-Martin-de-Ré against Royal forces on 27 October 1622.

He later participated to the uprising led by Benjamin, Duke of Soubise in 1625, leading to the Capture of Ré island by Royal forces in September 1625.

He became mayor of La Rochelle and, during the siege of La Rochelle between 1627 and 1628, he organized an energetic resistance to the troops of king Louis XIII. The scene is still visible today in the Hôtel de Ville of La Rochelle, where a marble table with a chip made by his dagger is on display.

Then, Richelieu offered him leadership in the royal fleet and he fought Spain. One of his daughters married the son of the famous Protestant admiral Abraham Duquesne, Abraham Duquesne-Guitton.

Like many other Rochelais (people from La Rochelle), Jean Guiton was a Huguenot. In October 1911, a statue by the sculptor, Ernest Henri Dubois, of Guiton was unveiled in the Place de l'Hôtel de Ville.

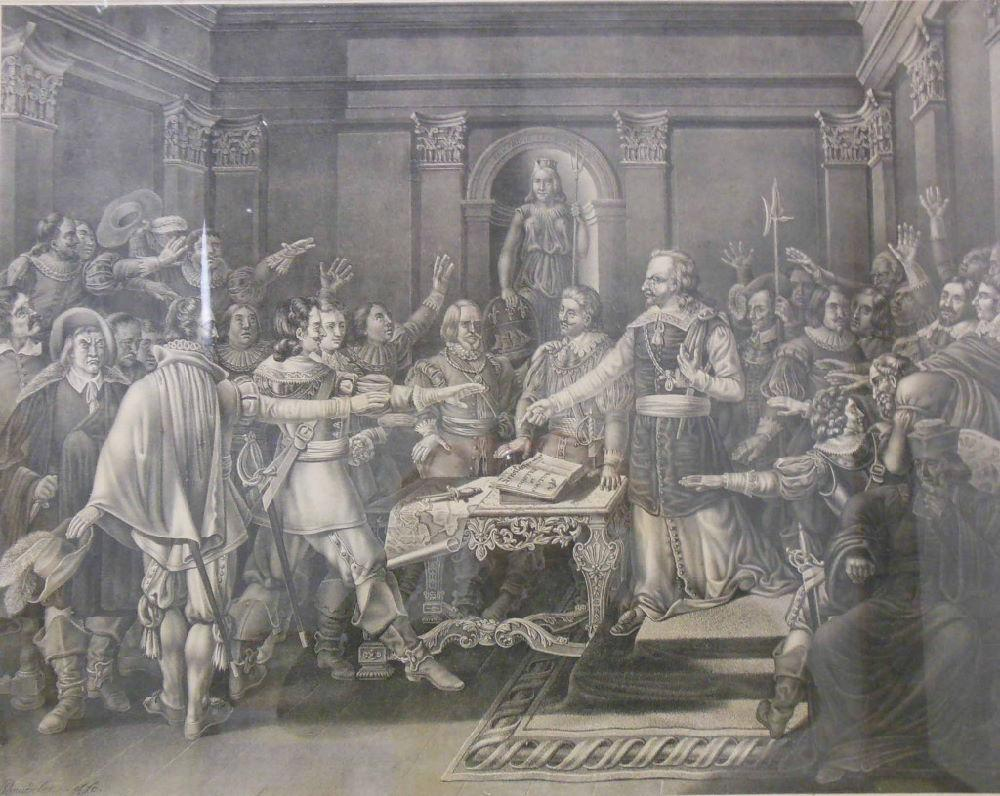
Jean Guitton at the La Rochelle City Hall, vowing to defend the city to the death
