= Siege of Montpellier =

1622 siege

- Part of the Huguenot rebellions
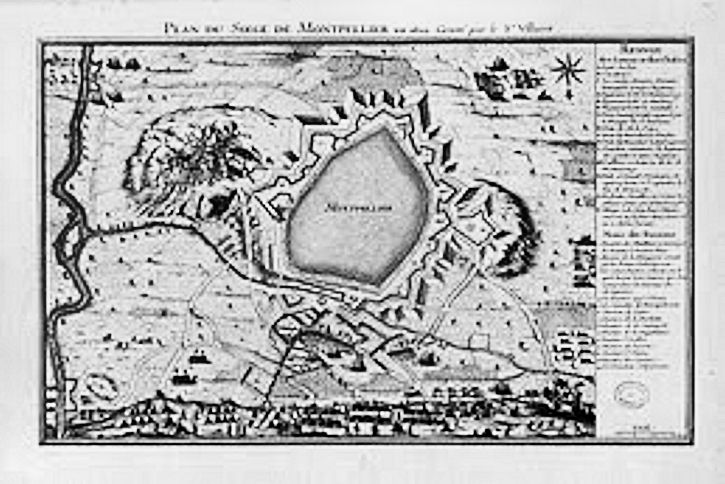
- Military map of the siege of Montpellier, 1622
Date	31 August – October 1622
Location	Montpellier 43.6119°N 3.8772°E
Result	Stalemate

Belligerents
France	Huguenot

Commanders and leaders
Louis XIII; Henri de Condé-Bourbon	Henri de Rohan; Etienne d'Americ

Strength
10,000 (initially), 20,000 (end)	4,000 (relief army)

The siege of Montpellier was a siege of the Huguenot city of Montpellier by the Catholic forces of Louis XIII of France, from August to October 1622. It was part of the Huguenot rebellions.

== Background ==
Louis XIII stationed his troops around Montpellier in July 1622. A treaty was agreed upon between Henri, Duke of Rohan, and Louis XIII, through his officer, Marshal Lesdiguières; it was signed by Rohan on 22 August 1622. The inhabitants of Montpellier, however, refused to open their gate to royal troops, fearing depredation by Henri II, Prince of Condé, and issued conditions under which the King could enter the city.

== Siege ==
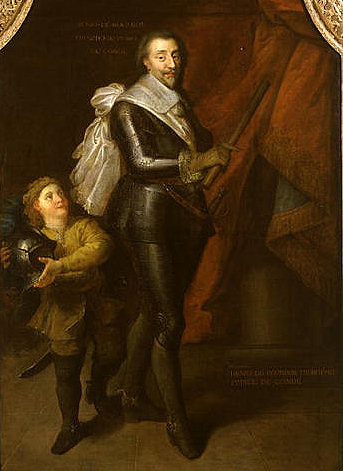
Condé initially led the siege.

Outraged, Louis XIII revoked Lesdiguières' command, and ordered his troops to set up a siege of the city. The besieging army was placed under the command of Condé.

Etienne d'Americ led the defense of Montpellier in an energetic manner. Operations proved to be difficult for the troops of Louis XIII. Royal troops captured the bastion of Saint-Denis on 2 September, which had a commanding position over the city, but the stronghold was recaptured by the Huguenots the following day, leaving 200 dead in the royal army. That same day, 400 Huguenots under Galonges, the Commander of the Montpellier garrison, made a sortie and defeated 1000 royal troops.

On 2 October, the Huguenots were able to repel three assaults by royal troops numbering 5,000. The assault left from 300 to 400 dead in the royal camps, and many more wounded. At the same time, the royal army was plagued with sickness and was running short of supplies.

== Aftermath ==
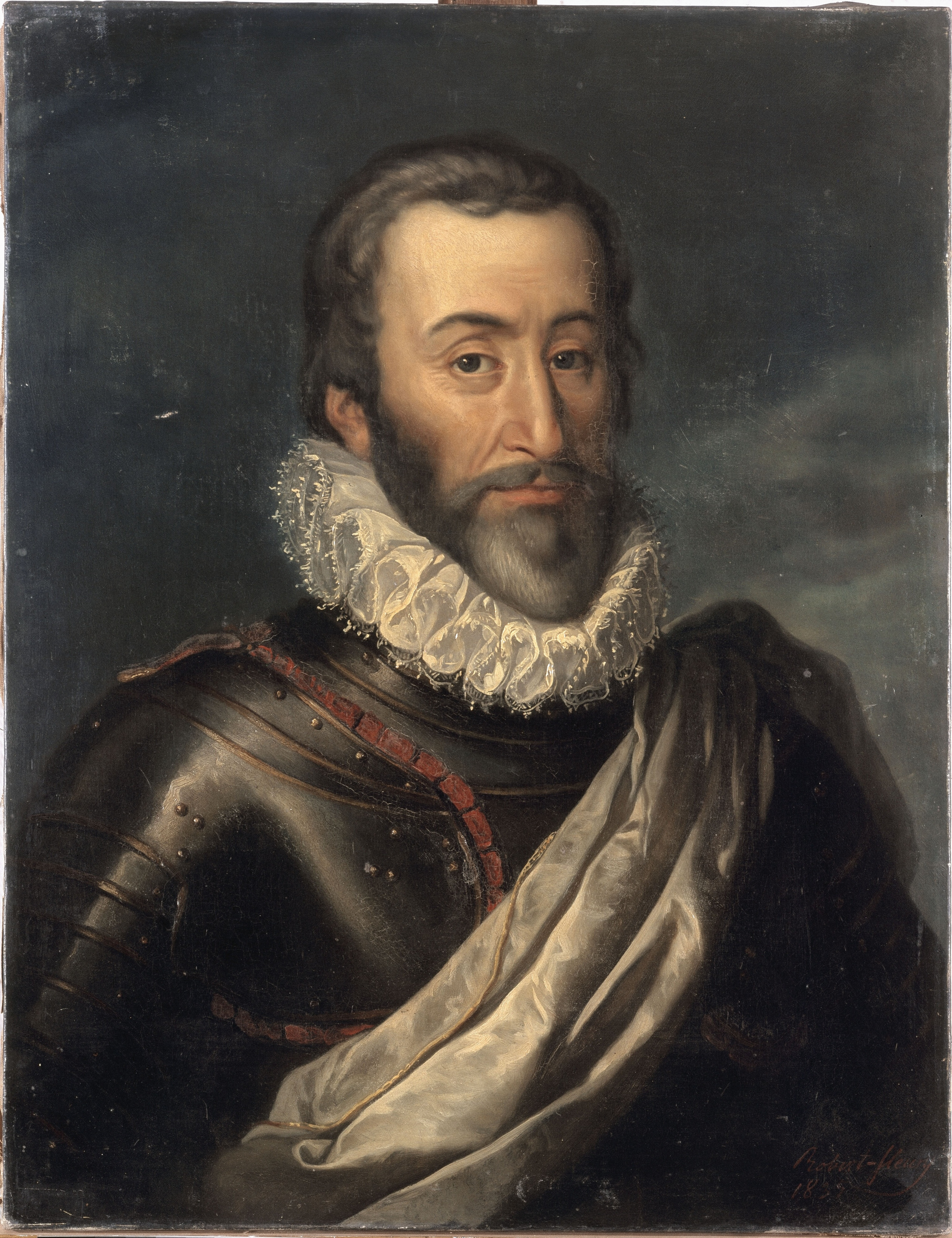
Lesdiguières negotiated the peace between the King and the Huguenots at Montpelliers.

Finally, Louis XIII authorized negotiations to be resumed, asking Lesdiguières to lead the army once more, and to secretly negotiate at the same time. On 8 October, Rohan arrived in front of Montpellier with a relief army of 4,000 veterans. He might have fought victoriously, but he desired to negotiate, as he was running short of international support.

The inhabitants agreed to make amends, and the King granted his pardon, leading to the signature of the Treaty of Montpellier on 19 October, in which the King fully confirmed the observation of the Edict of Nantes, but the Huguenots agreed to the dismantlement of the fortifications of Montpellier, Nîmes, and Uzès.

Louis XIII finally entered Montpellier on 20 October 1622, bareheaded and unarmed. Royal troops entered the city, effectively occupied it, and started to dismantle its fortifications.
