= Treaty of Montpellier =

1622 treaty between France and the Huguenots

The Treaty of Montpellier (or the Peace of Montpellier) was signed in Montpellier, France on 18 October 1622 between François de Bonne, Duke of Lesdiguières, on behalf of King Louis XIII and Duke Henry II of Rohan. The treaty followed the siege of Montpellier and ended hostilities between French royalists and the Huguenots. It confirmed the religious tenets of the Edict of Nantes and pardoned Rohan, but reduced the number of Huguenot places de sûreté (military installations) to two: in La Rochelle and Montauban. The Huguenots would have to raze their other fortifications. They also would thenceforth be forbidden from holding their general assemblies and synods.

This peace would last only two years, as neither the King nor the Huguenots were ready to respect its terms. The brother of Rohan, Benjamin, Duke of Soubise, attacked a royal fleet in the battle of Blavet in January 1625.

== See also ==
- List of treaties
