= Battle of Pont du Feneau =

1627 land battle between France and England

Battle of the Pont du Feneau
- Part of Huguenot rebellions and the Anglo-French War (1627–1629)
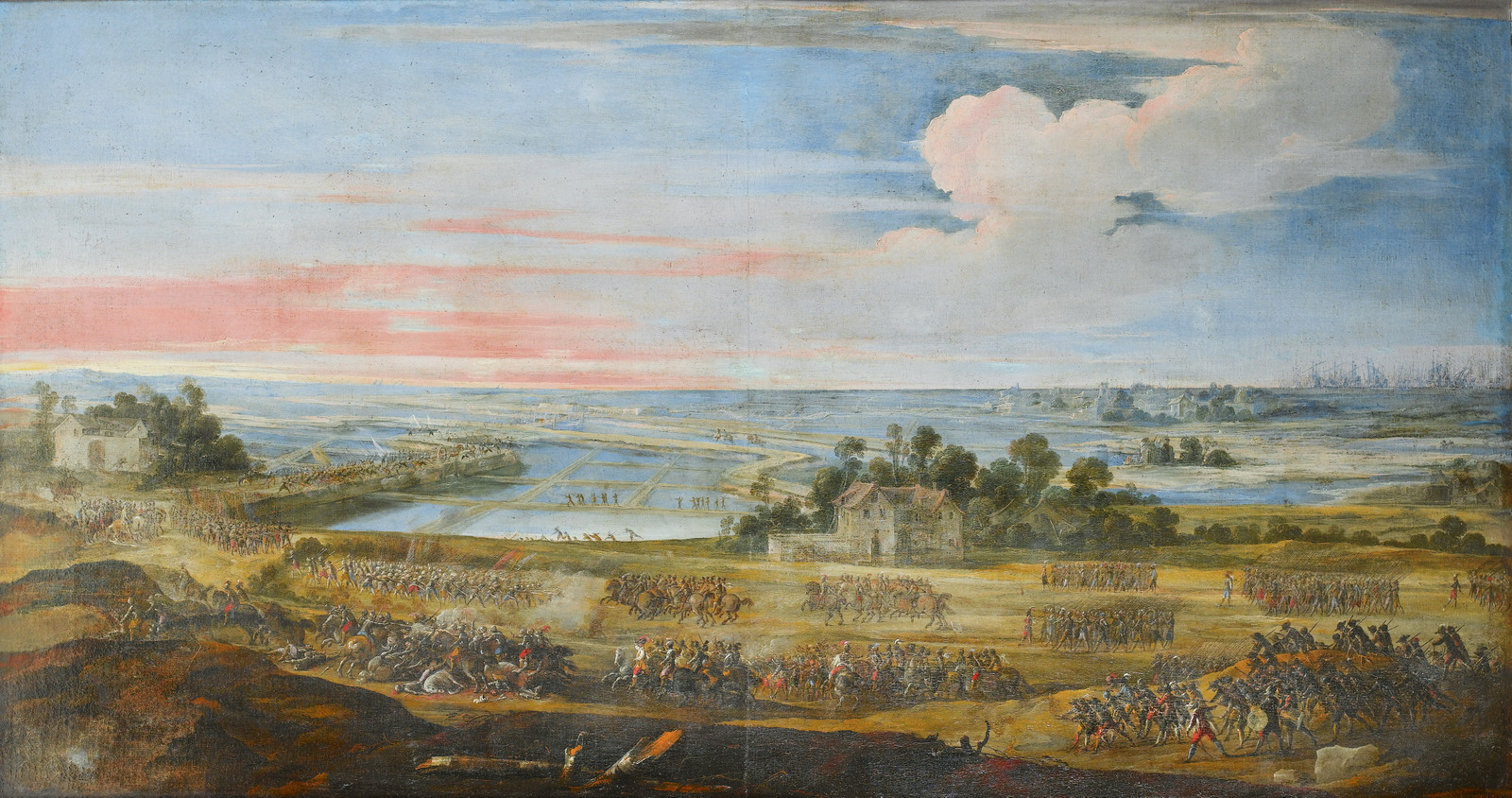
- Painting by Laurent de La Hyre depicting the battle
| Date | 8 November 1627 |
| Location | Bridge of Feneau, Île de Ré 46.217°N 1.455°W |
| Result | French victory |

Combatants
| France | (Kingdom of England) England |

Commanders and leaders
| Jean de Saint-Bonnet; Henri de Schomberg; Louis de Marillac; Pierre de Gondil (WIA) | (Kingdom of England) George Villiers (Kingdom of England) Mountjoy Blount (POW) (Kingdom of England) Milord Grey (POW) |

Strength
| About 4,500 soldiers and 200 cavaliers | About 3,500 soldiers, 68 cavaliers, and 4 cannons |

Casualties and losses
| About 550 | About 1,800 soldiers, 68 cavaliers, and 4 cannons |

The Battle of Pont du Feneau was the last battle of the siege of Saint-Martin-de-Ré by the English forces that had come to help the Huguenot rebellions of La Rochelle. It took place on 8 November 1627. The English lost the battle, and this final failure forced them to withdraw back to England.

== Before the battle ==
=== English side ===
The English forces, having been defeated earlier that day at the siege of Saint-Martin, pulled back to the village of Loix, where their ships were anchored. Because of bad food, many soldiers in their army were sick. The army was commanded by George Villiers, the first duke of Buckingham, and was composed of 12 infantry regiments and 4 cannons, as well as several volunteer rochelais protestants, all covered by the cavalry, consisting of about 68 horses.

Not having seen the French forces since their retreat from Saint-Martin, Buckingham's troops thought the French would not attack and, growing reckless, were neither walking in closed or open ranks. They arrived at the wooden bridge of the Feneau that they had built when they first landed on the island, that linked the island of Loix to the rest of l'île de ré.

=== French side ===
The French troops were commanded by the Maréchal Henri de Schomberg who, informed of the English retreat by Jean Caylar d'Anduze de Saint-Bonnet, had reassembled his army and begun pursuing the English. The French cavalry was commanded by Louis de Marillac.

== The battle ==
The English vanguard marched towards Loix. Two English battalions, commanded by colonels Sir Edward Conway, Sir Peregrine Barty, Sir Henery Spry, had crossed the bridge. Another battalion, led by Colonel Sir Charles Rich, the brother of the count of Holland Henry Rich, 1st Earl of Holland and half brother of Mountjoy Blount, 1st Earl of Newport, Sir Alexander Brett and the lieutenant of Sir Thomas Morton (he being sick), were getting ready to cross the bridge with the four cannons. The two last battalions, that had not yet engaged themselves on the bridge, were commanded by Colonel Sir William Courtney, Lieutenant-Colonel Sir Edward Hawley and Sir Ralph Bingley.

The Maréchal de Schomberg, having crossed the village of La Couarde, was informed by Marillac of the English position. The English vanguard started to engage itself, slowly, because of the narrowness, on the bridge of Feneau. Judging the time to be right, the Maréchal ordered the cavalry captain Bussi-Lamet to charge the English rearguard with his squadron. He was followed closely by Marillac and Schomberg himself, leading the rest of the cavalry. The English cavaliers retaliated but were defeated. Many English were killed, including Sir William Cunningham, and others were captured, including Mountjoy Blount, 1st Earl of Newport, colonel of the English cavalry, and half-brother of Sir Charles Rich and the count Holland, Henry Rich, 1st Earl of Holland. The English infantry intervened but also was defeated. Two regiments of the French infantry, the Piémont regiment, commanded by François Duval de Fontenay-Mareuil, and the Champagne regiment commanded by Pierre Arnaud arrived in the melee. An important part of the English forces was violently pushed in the many muddy ditches in the area. The two English battalions before the bridge were defeated. A few rochelais protestants managed to cross the bridge. The French then started crossing the bridge, killing everyone in their way, notably Sir Charles Rich and Sir Alexander Brett, that tried to defend it. There are two different versions of the outcome of the battle.

=== English version ===
After having crossed the bridge, the French forces, guided by Marillac, confronted Sir Thomas Fryar and Lieutenant-Colonel Hackluit commanding 40 pikes and 20 musketeers guarding the artillery and munitions. They were rapidly assisted by Sir Piers Crosby, commanding an Irish regiment. The French then panicked and withdrew to the bridge, disobeying the orders of Marillac. They then rallied and the count of Saligny, with a group of pikemen, charged again. They were, however, repelled and lost a commander. They charged a final time, were repelled again and withdraw from battle and crossed the bridge back, chased by the English. While routing the French made Marillac fall from his horse. The English put an end to the chase and crossed the bridge back to the island of Loix. The guarding of the bridge was given to Sir Piers Crosby. A few days later, when the sailing conditions became better, Crosby burned the bridge, and the surviving English forces embarked on their ships.

=== French version ===
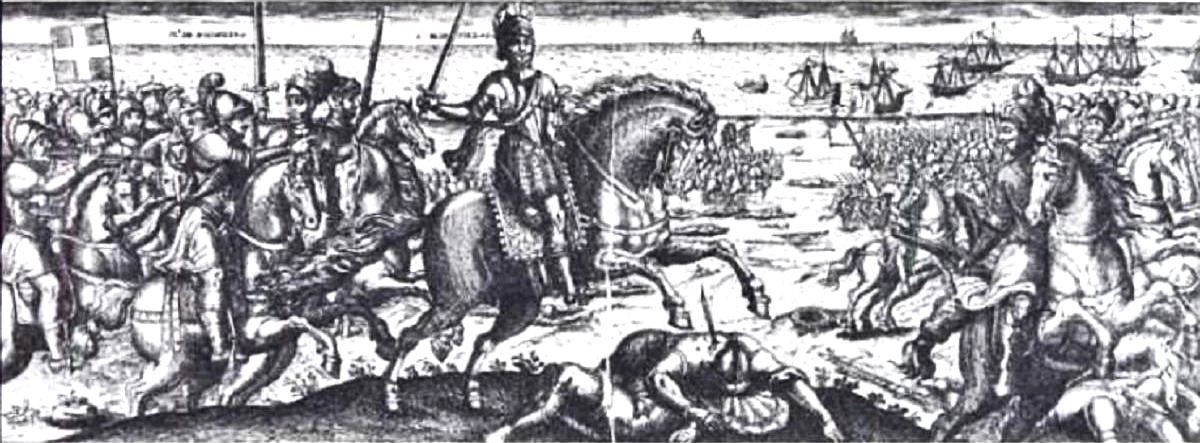
"Combat et victoire obtenue sur les Anglois" (combat and victory obtained on the English) by Michel de la Mathoniere, 1627

Marillac dismounted from his horse and took over the command of the forces. After having crossed the bridge, the French forces captured the four small cannons of the English artillery. Few French soldiers fought on the front line, as a large part of the French forces took time capturing prisoners and the English arsenal. Marillac gave the order to move the arsenal a hundred feet back. The count of Saligny then arrived with a few fresh men. He fought remarkably, and the English soldiers lifted up their pikes and marched towards him. He only had a dozen men left, including Feuquiere and Porcheux, captain of the guards regiment, that stood their ground and held the line. The men around Marillac pulled back in disorder, in spite of his orders, and even made him fall down. Saligny and his men, however, held on and contained the English, allowing the French soldiers to get refreshed and return to the melee. The fight lasted for two hours, after which the French triumphed over the English.

The English army was in a mass rout. The causeway to Loix was covered in bodies, the ditches were full of men that were knocked unconscious in the mud. Some English soldiers swore they were Catholic, even showing rosaries and asking for mercy, but the French were ruthless. Many French noblemen were in the melee: the marquis of Annonay, Charles de Lévis-Ventadour, who would later become duke of Ventadour; Antoine d'Aumont de Rochebaron, marquis of Villequier; the knight of Chappe and his brother; Jean of Estampes-Valençay, baron of Valençay; the count of Charraux or Chârost Louis of Béthune, who would later become captain of the King's bodyguards; the count of Saligny, "a man of heart and of unique virtue"; Isaac of Raynié, Lord of Drouet; L'isle-Cerillac; Manassès de Pas de Feuquières; L'isle Montmartin; Pierre Arnaud, mestre de camp of the regiment of Champagne; Alexandre of Garnier, Lord of the Garets; de Jonquieres; Jean-Louis the 1st of Louët of Calvisson; and Jacques of Castelnau of La Mauvissière. Toiras himself fought, sword in hand. The English soldiers fled on every side, in the marshes, on the ditches' crossings, in the vineyards, constantly under fire from the French troops that chased them. Schonberg ordered the French troops pursuing the English to Loix to stop because they needed to rally and reorganize. Furthermore, night was falling. The retreat was signaled. The maréchal had the bridge guarded until he was certain that the English army had withdrawn from the island's soil.

== Outcome of the battle ==
The air was fire and smoke, the land was covered in cadavers, and the water was reddened by the blood.

The outcome of the battle was very costly for the English, counting about 1.800 dead; including 5 colonels; 3 lieutenant-colonels; 20 gentlemen, including Sir Henry Spry, Sir Charles Rich, Sir Alexander Brett, Sir Ralph Bingley, Sir William Cunningham, and 150 officers; and a thousand injured. 46 flags were captured. The captured included Milord Montjoye, cavalry commandant; the colonel Milord Grey (possibly Henry Grey, 1st Earl of Stamford), grand master of the artillery; 35 captains or officers; 12 gentlemen; and between 100 and 120 soldiers. Every English horse, including Buckingham's, was captured, as well as the 4 cannons.

Colonel Grey fell in a salt-pit during the battle, and shouted out to save his life, "A hundred thousand crowns for my ransom!". He was therefore captured and not killed.

The Maréchal de Schonberg did not say a word about the French casualties, however, they were probably close to 500 or 600. The injured included the Général des Galères, Pierre de Gondi, having received two pistol shots to the shoulder; the Marquis of Villequier having received a musket shot through his body (but "the injury was without danger"); De Iade, the captain of Schonberg's bodyguards and his squire took a pistol shot to the knee; Cussigny (André, lord of Cussigny and the barres ?), injured by a pike stab to the throat, and Porcheux having had his thigh torn. Toiras himself nearly got injured, taking two pistol shots that holed his hat.

== Aftermath ==
Of the 46 flags, the first having been captured by Sieur de Belinghem helped by Sieur de Moüy de la Mailleraye, all were sent to Paris by Claude de Saint-Simon and displayed on the vaults of Notre-Dame.

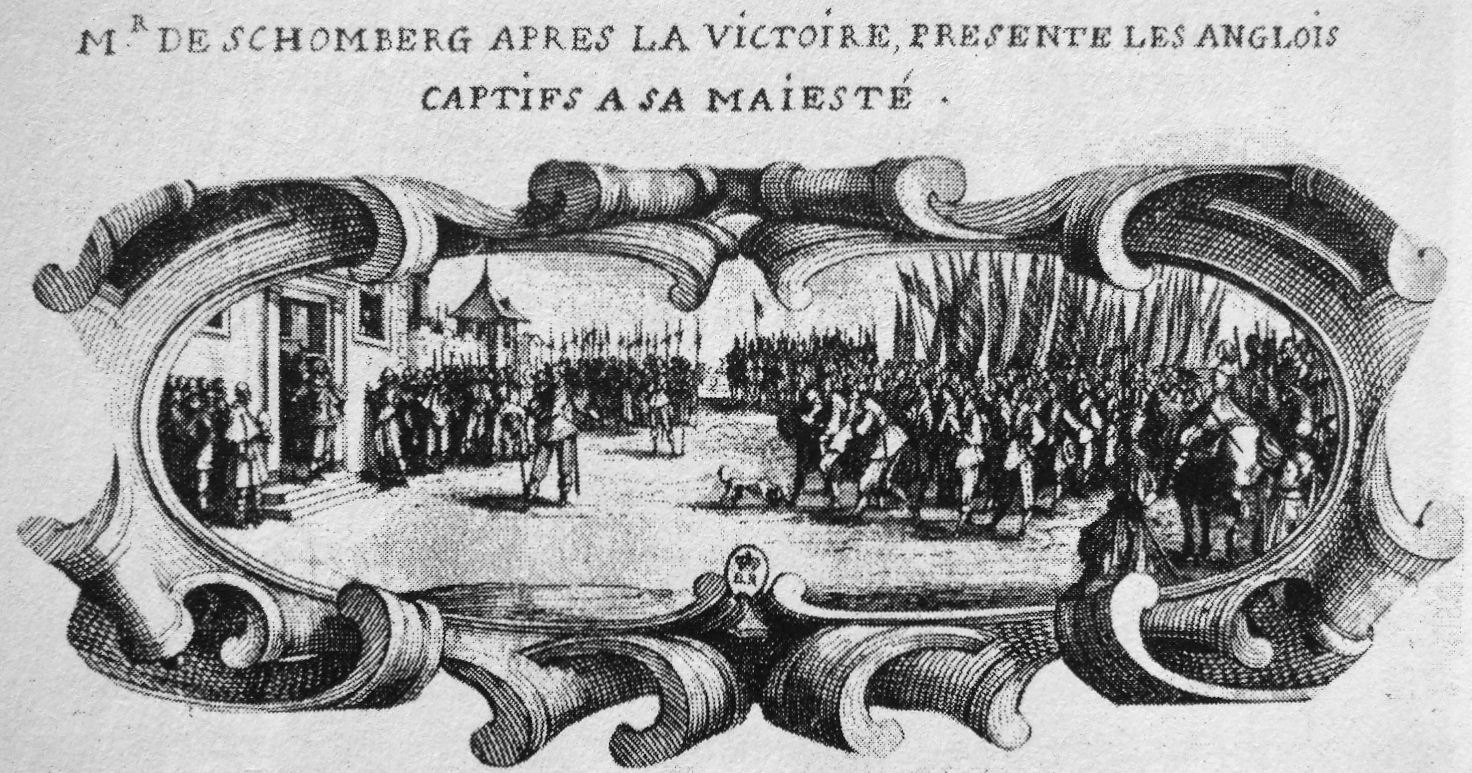
"Messire de Schonberg après la victoire, présente les anglois captifs à sa majesté" (Messire de Schonberg after the victory, presents the English prisoners to his majesty), XVIIth century

Toiras went back to the citadel of Saint-Martin, where the prisoners were also taken, to keep track of the Anglo-Rochelaise fleet. Some of the prisoners were ransomed. Schomberg returned to Saint-Martin as well to rest. He preferred not to leave the island until he was sure of the final departure of Buckingham.

On the English side, about 2.000 survivors were on the ships including Benjamin de Rohan, lord of Soubise and younger brother of Henri II de Rohan, a French protestant. Buckingham, after having let his troops rest, left on 17 November to return to England after 3 months and 6 days of battle, promising to the rochelais protestants who had re-supplied his troops with fresh water twice to return with a bigger army. He would however not be able to stay true to his word, being assassinated by John Felton at the Greyhound Pub in Portsmouth on 23 August 1628, before the departure of the second expedition.

Two centuries later, salt producers near the bridge of Feneau opened a pit to bury the many bones, bullets, and cannonballs scattered around on the ground.

== Posterity ==
The battle was painted by Laurent de la Hyre in "La défaite des Anglais en l'île de Ré par l'armée française le 8 novembre 1627", (the defeat of the English on île de Ré by the French army on the 8th of November 1627) between December 1627 and early 1628. The painting is large, at 112x120 cm. It is conserved in Paris, musée de l'Armée, hôtel des Invalides.

== See also ==
- French Wars of Religion
