= Recovery of Ré Island =

1625 military conflict

Recovery of Ré Island Reprise de l'Île de Ré
- Part of the Huguenot rebellions
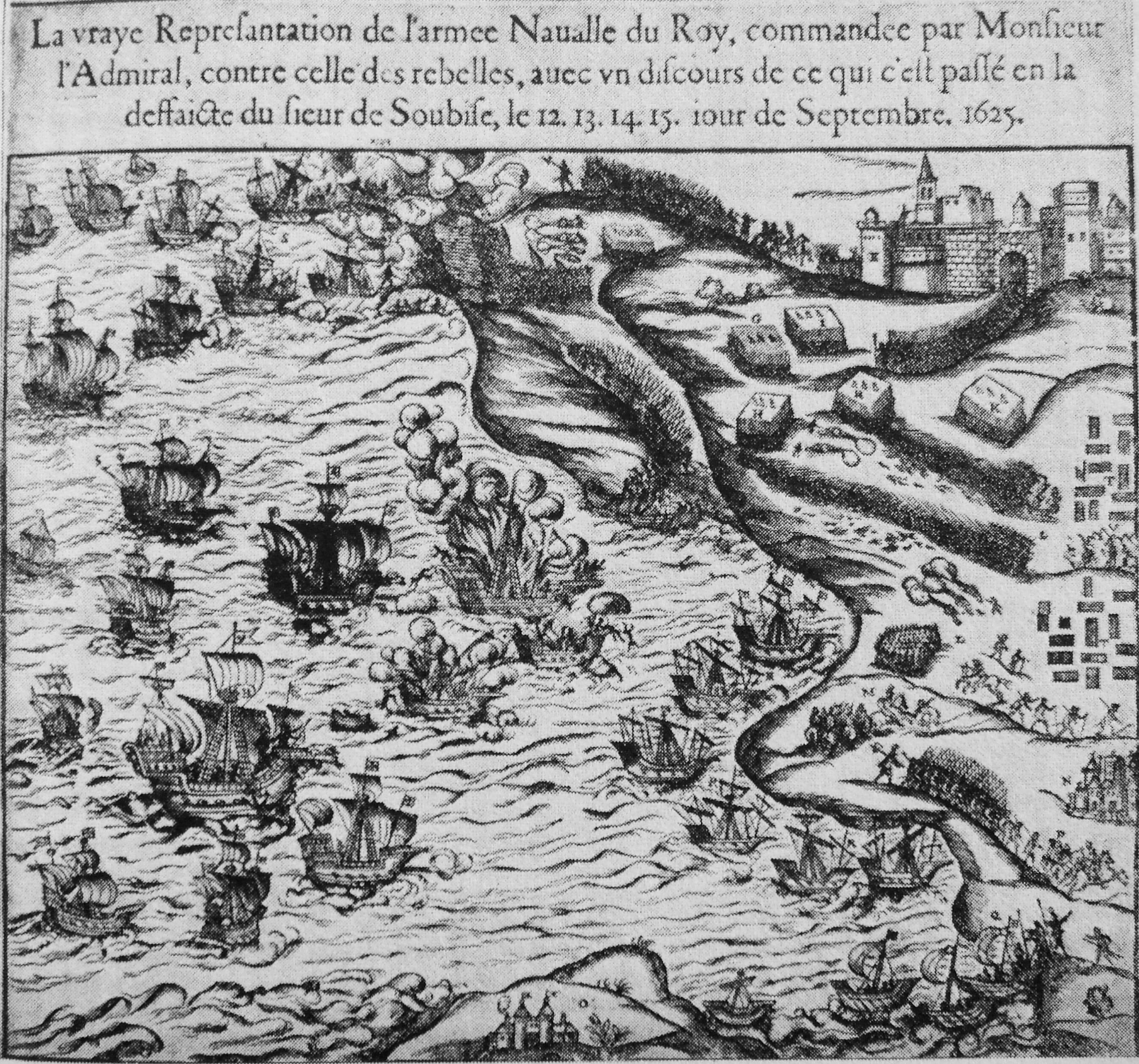
- Capture of Île de Ré by Charles, Duke of Guise on 16 September 1625. Description of the action from 12 to 15 September 1625.
Date	September 1625
Location	Île de Ré 46.2°N 1.4°W
Result	Royalist victory

Belligerents
France; Dutch Republic; England	La Rochelle; Huguenots

Commanders and leaders
Louis XIII; Charles de Guise; Henri de Montmorency; Toiras (Dutch Republic) Willem de Zoete	Duc de Soubise; Jean Guiton

Strength
French forces: 35 warships 20 Dutch warships 7 English warships	Total men: 3,000; 28 warships

The Recovery of Ré Island (French: Reprise de l'Île de Ré) was accomplished by the army of Louis XIII in September 1625, against the troops of the Protestant admiral Soubise and the Huguenot forces of La Rochelle, who had been occupying the Island of Ré since February 1625 as part of the Huguenot rebellions.

== Background ==
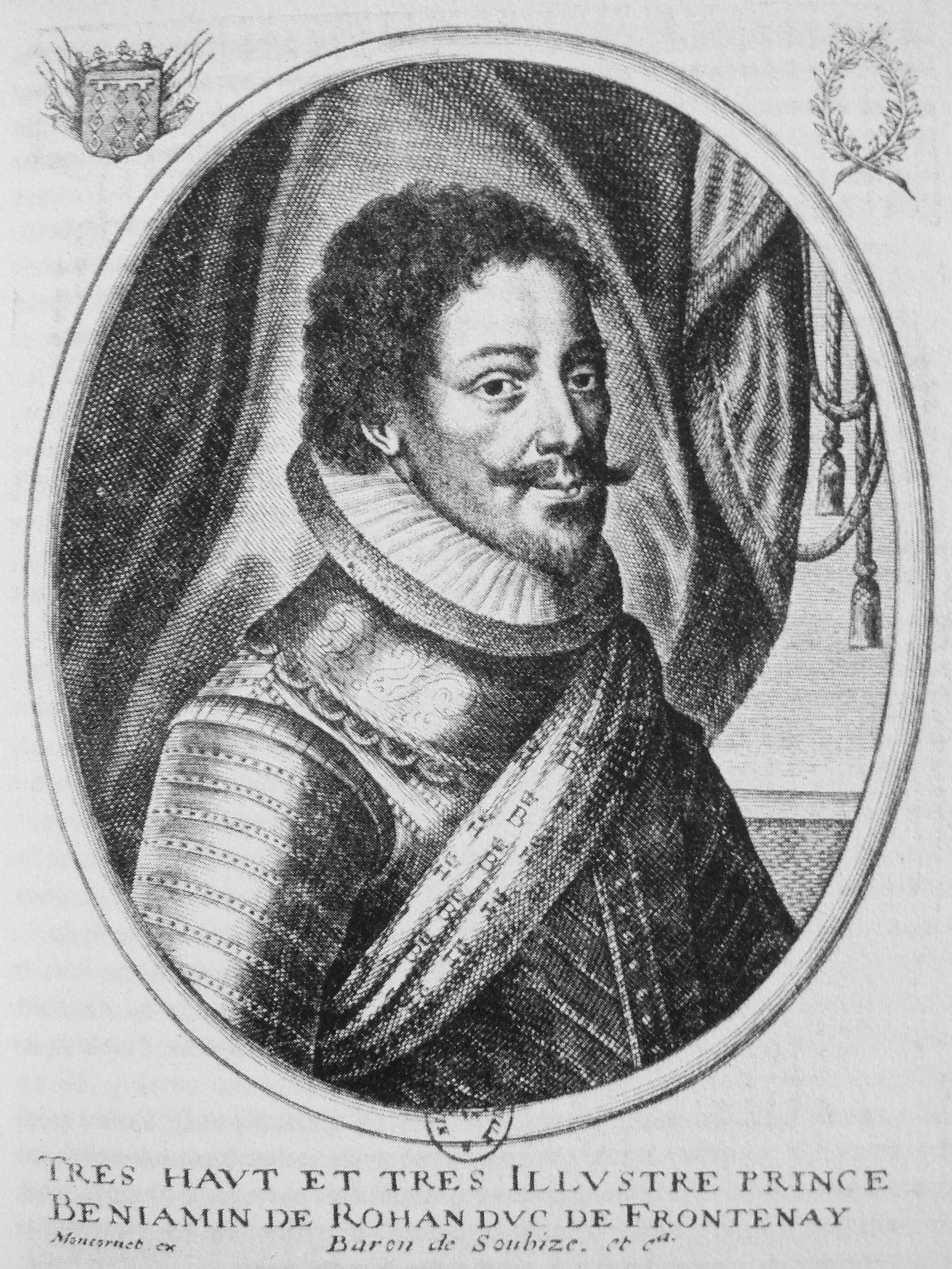
Benjamin de Rohan, duc de Soubise

The Protestants had been resisting the central Royal government with the 1620–1622 Protestant rebellion, leading to the Naval battle of Saint-Martin-de-Ré on 27 October 1622 between the naval forces of La Rochelle and a Royal fleet under Charles de Guise. An uneasy peace was made with the Treaty of Montpellier, but frustrations remained on both sides.

In February 1625, the Protestant Benjamin de Rohan, duc de Soubise, led a Huguenot revolt against the French king Louis XIII, and, after publishing a manifesto, invaded and occupied the island of Ré. He seized Ré with 300 soldiers and 100 sailors. From there he sailed up the coast to Brittany where he led a successful attack on the royal fleet in the Battle of Blavet. Soubise then returned to Ré with 15 ships and soon occupied the Ile d'Oléron as well, thus taking control of the Atlantic coast from Nantes to Bordeaux. Through these deeds, he was recognized as the head of the reform, and named himself "Admiral of the Protestant Church". The French Navy, by contrast, was depleted, leaving the central government very vulnerable.

The Huguenot city of La Rochelle voted to join Soubise on 8 August 1625.

== Encounter and capture of the island ==
Charles, Duke of Guise, organized a landing in order to re-capture the islands, using 20 borrowed Dutch warships as well as seven English ships under the Duke of Montmorency.

=== Naval battle of Pertuis Breton ===
The Dutch fleet of 20 warships was supplied under the terms of the 1624 Franco-Dutch Treaty of Compiègne, and was under the command of Admiral Willem Haultain de Zoete. It would be withdrawn from French service in February 1626 after a resolution of the States-General in December 1625.

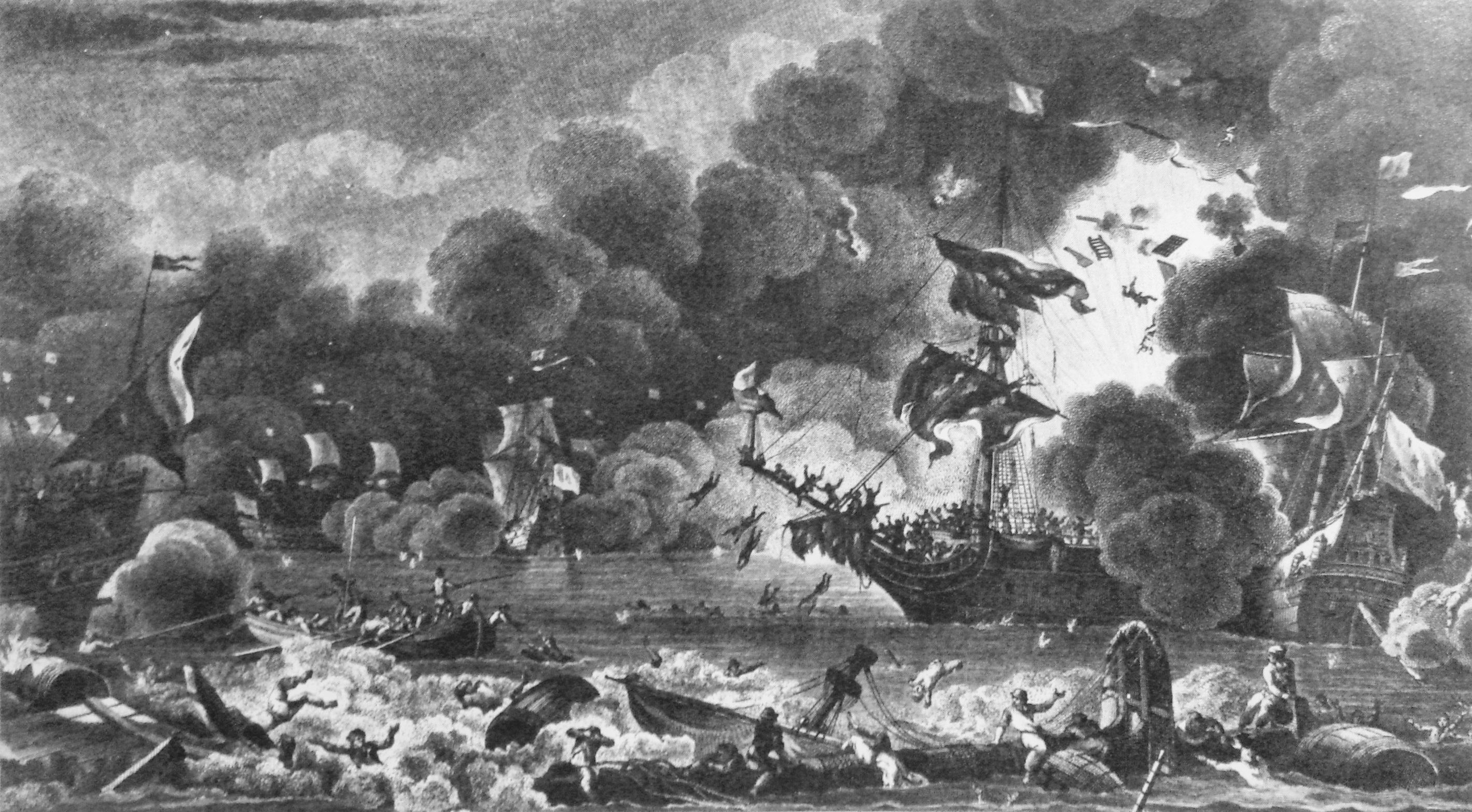
Battle of Pertuis Breton in 1625, between Soubise and the Duc de Montmorency, with the explosion of the Dutch ship under Vice-Admiral Van Dorp. Pierre Ozanne

The English king Charles I and Duke of Buckingham had negotiated with the French regent, Cardinal Richelieu, for English ships to aid Richelieu in his fight against the French Protestants (Huguenots), in return for French aid against the Spanish occupying the Electorate of the Palatinate (Mansfeld expedition of 1624-25), an agreement which led to great trouble with the English parliament, which was horrified by the help given to France against the Huguenots. Seven English ships were delivered by Captain Pennington after many misgivings, and were employed in the conflict, although they were essentially manned by French crews, as most of the English crews had refused to serve against their coreligionaries and had disembarked in Dieppe. The English ships duly saw action against La Rochelle, however.

On 16 July 1625, Soubise managed to blow up the Dutch ship under Vice-Admiral Philipps Van Dorp, with a loss of 300 Dutch sailors.

=== Naval battle of Saint-Martin de Ré and landing ===
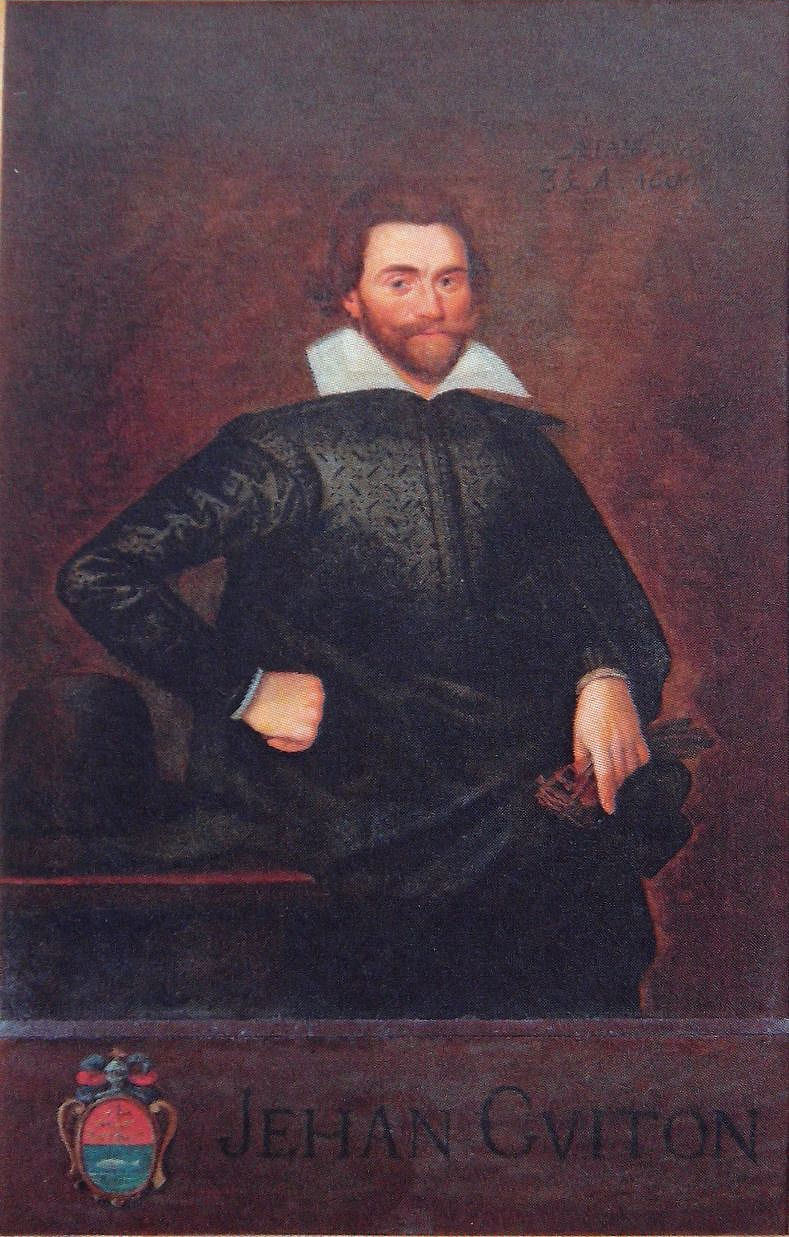
The fleet of La Rochelle led by Jean Guiton was defeated by Montmorency on 15 September 1625.

In September 1625, Montmorency led his large fleet out of Les Sables d'Olonne, and finally defeated the fleet of La Rochelle, commanded by Jean Guiton and Soubise, in front of Saint-Martin-de-Ré on 15 September 1625.

Two elite regiments of royal troops under Toiras were landed on the island, defeating Soubise with his 3,000 men. The island of Ré was invested, forcing Soubise to flee to England with his few remaining ships. Montmorency thus managed to recover both Île de Ré and Ile d'Oléron.

== Aftermath ==
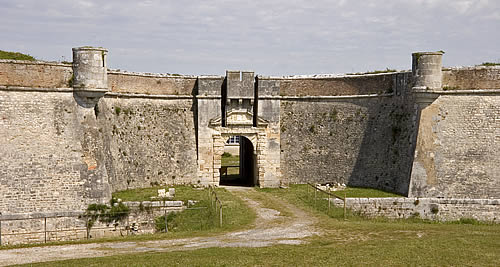
The Fort de La Prée was built by Toiras in 1625 following the capture of the island.

After long negotiations, a peace agreement, the Treaty of Paris (1626), was finally signed between the city of La Rochelle and King Louis XIII on 5 February 1626, preserving religious freedom but imposing some guaranties against possible future upheavals: La Rochelle was prohibited from keeping a war fleet and had to destroy a fort in Tasdon. The contentious Fort Louis under Royal control near the western gate of the city was supposed to be destroyed "in reasonable time".

The French officer Toiras was named as Governor of the island, and he started to reinforce fortifications in view of future attacks, especially at the Fort de La Prée and Saint-Martin-de-Ré.

An English offensive to capture the island would again take place in 1627 to support the Siege of La Rochelle, leading to the second Siege of Saint-Martin-de-Ré led by the Duke of Buckingham against Toiras.

The conflict clearly showed the dependence of France on foreign navies. This led Richelieu to launch ambitious plans for a national fleet.
