= Fort de La Prée =

Fortress at La Flotte, Charente-Maritime, France

Coordinates: 46.1808°N 1.2887°W

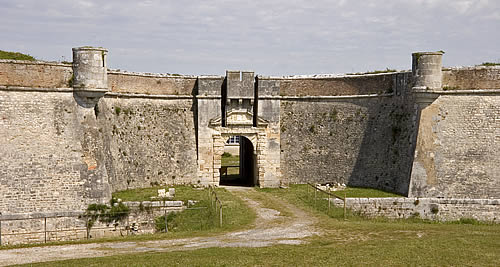
Entrance to Fort de La Prée

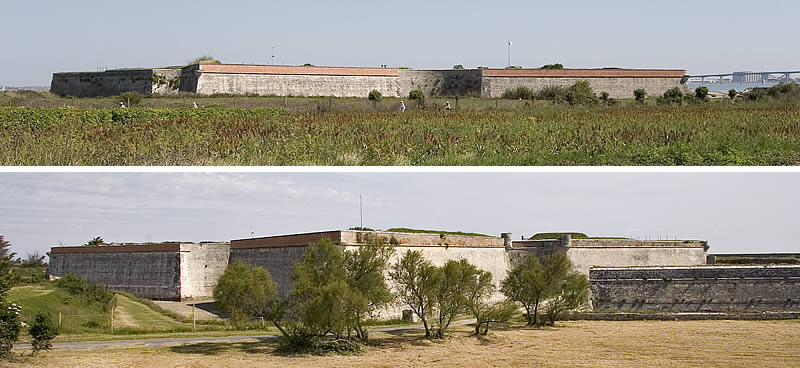
Fort de La Prée from the south.

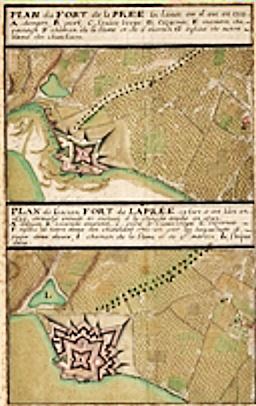
Fort de La Prée, 1722 map.

Fort de La Prée, built in 1625, is located near the eastern end of the Île de Ré, in France.

== History ==
In 1625, the French officer Toiras led the Royalist troops when they captured Ré from the Huguenots under the command of admiral Duke of Soubise. After his victory, Toiras received the title of count, and became Governor of Île de Ré. He had the engineers Le Camus and Pierre de Conti d’Argencourt build Fort de La Prée to protect an anchorage on the island's eastern side. He also worked on the larger fortifications at Saint-Martin-de-Ré. They used materials salvaged from the remains of the Romanesque abbey of the Châteliers'

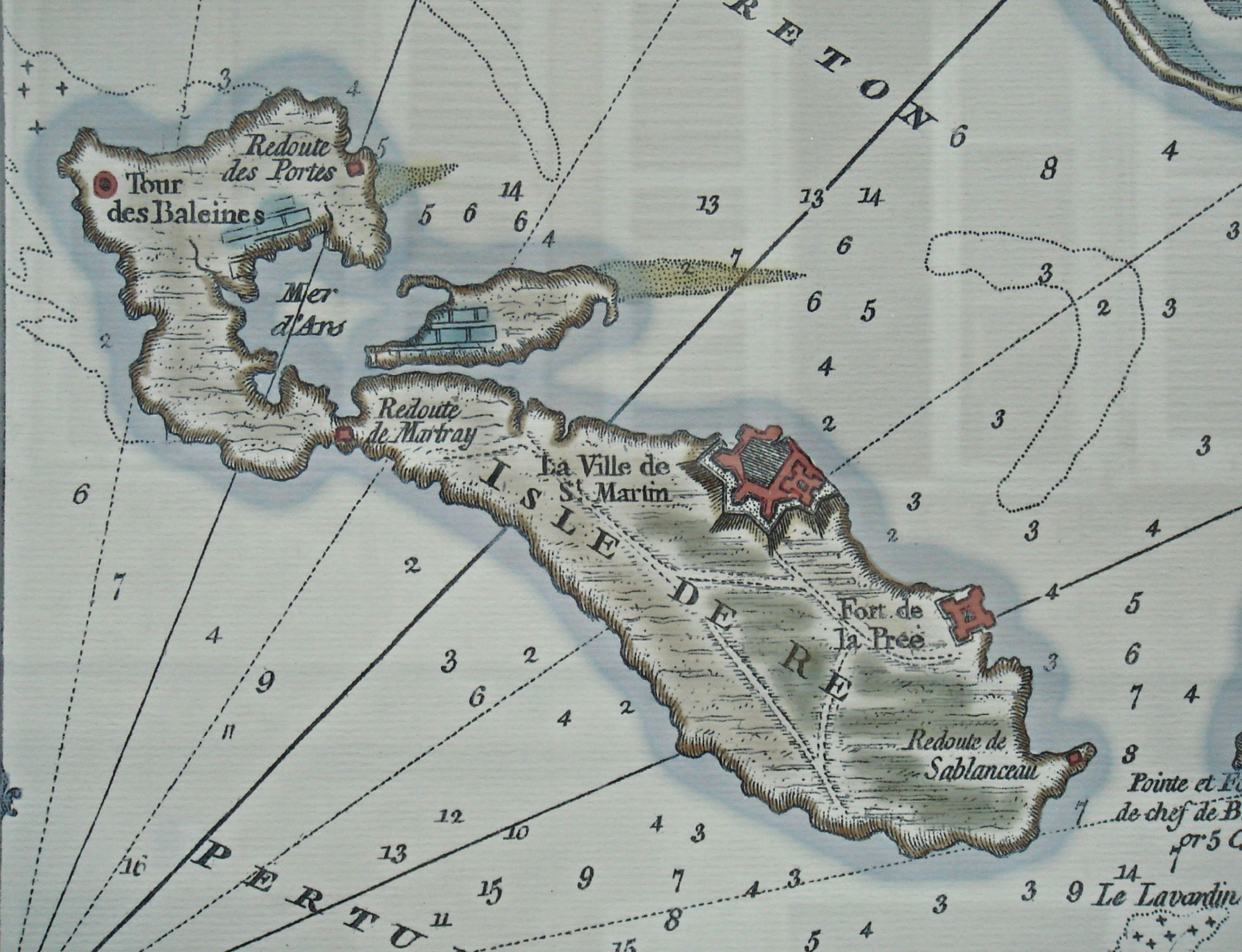
Fort de La Prée is located on the southeastern shore of the island of Ré. Chart of the Road of Basque, 1757.

The Duke of Buckingham ignored Fort de La Prée during his three-month siege of Saint-Martin-de-Ré in 1627. This neglect turned out to be a strategic error. Toiras managed to land troops there, and from there force the English to give up their siege and withdraw in defeat.

The fort subsequently underwent modifications under the oversight of several engineers — François Blondel (1664), Louis-Nicolas de Clerville (1672), Le Favolière, and finally Sainte-Colombe (1676). They added the gate, a barracks for 200 soldiers outside the walls, and some other outside works.

In 1685, Vauban, the preeminent engineer of the time, had François Ferr raze parts of the original fort, particularly the keep and the outworks that enclosed the entire fort.

The fort was later abandoned before being re-established in 1793. During the latter part of the 19th century, the external barracks were demolished. In 1875, the fort's covered way had sheltered passages added. The fort was decommissioned circa 1900.

During World War II the Germans occupied the fort. They added some blockhouses in the ramparts and on the seafront. From 1948, the fort became the administrative block for a development of vacations homes, but was closed in 1977.
