= Étienne (sculptor) =

French sculptor (1952–2025)

- Born: Étienne Pirot; 1 November 1952; Grenoble, France
- Died: 17 January 2025 (aged 72); Saint-Martin-de-Ré, France
- Education: University of Ottawa; Beaux-Arts de Paris
- Occupation: Sculptor

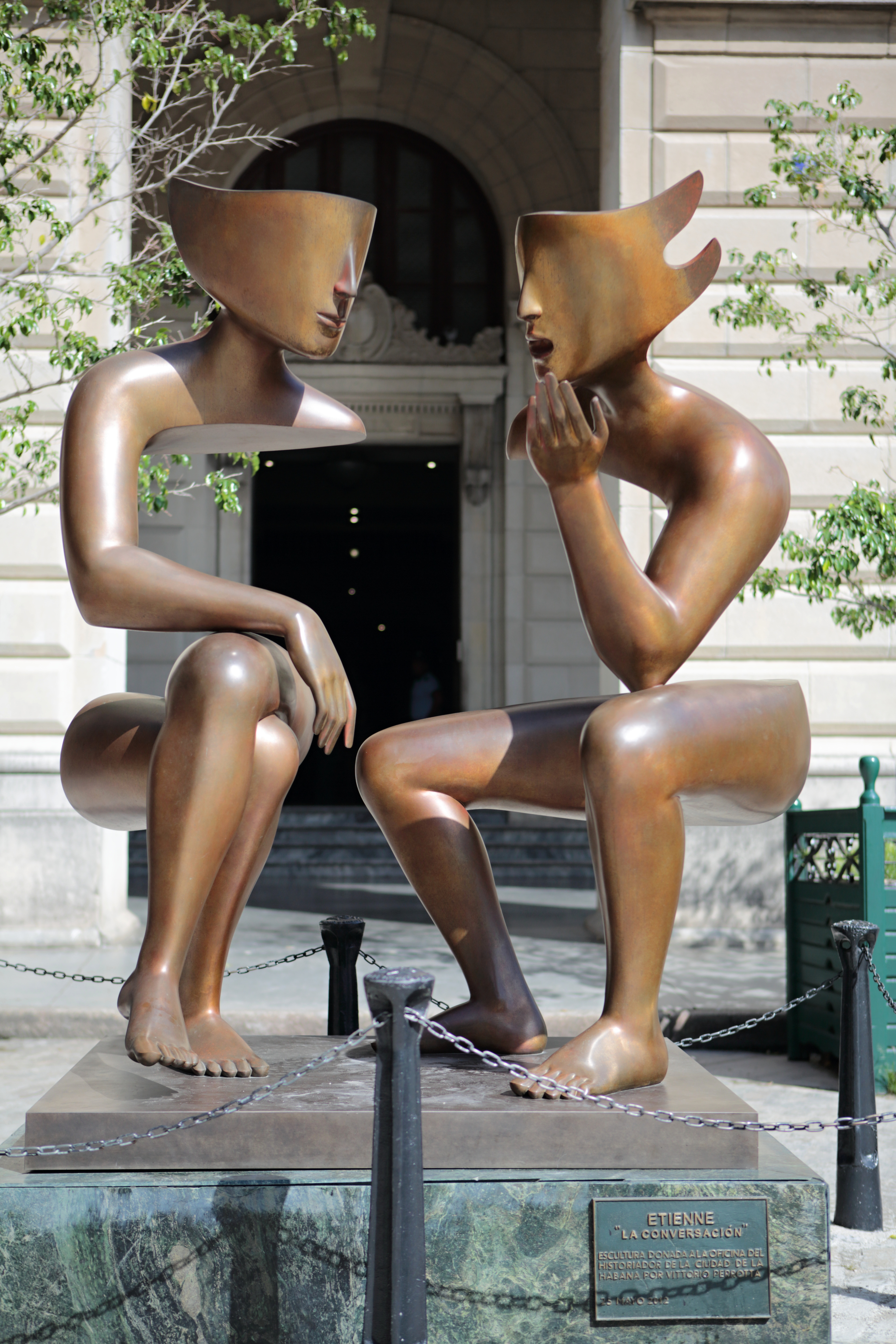
"La conversacion," displayed in Havana

Étienne Pirot (1 November 1952 – 17 January 2025), known simply as Étienne, was a French sculptor. He died on 17 January 2025, at the age of 72.

== Works ==
- Entrance to the Musée de la ville de Saint-Quentin-en-Yvelines
- Paul Claudel (Montigny-le-Bretonneux)
- l'Europe (Rueil-Malmaison)
- le Baiser (Mantes-la-Jolie)
- Robert Doisneau (Chalon-sur-Saône)
- La conversation (Havana)
- Le Pèlerin de Compostelle (Parthenay)
