= Loix =

- Commune
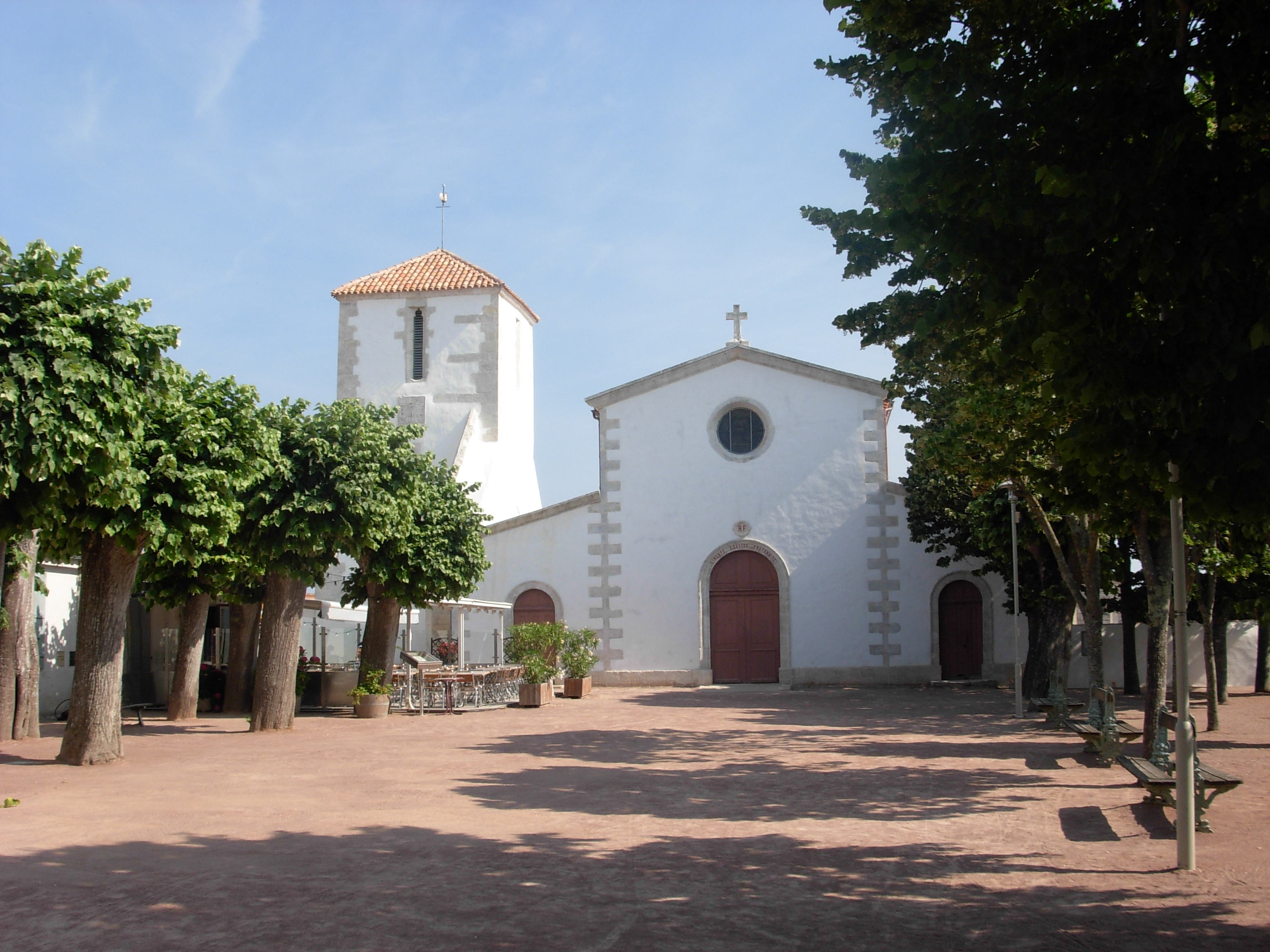
- The church of Sainte Catherine
- Location of Loix
- Location within France Location within Nouvelle-Aquitaine
- Coordinates: 46°13′24″N 1°26′28″W
- Country: France
- Region: Nouvelle-Aquitaine
- Department: Charente-Maritime
- Arrondissement: La Rochelle
- Canton: Île de Ré
- Intercommunality: Île de Ré

Government
  - Mayor (2020–2026): Lionel Quillet
- Area^{1}: 6.70 km^{2} (2.59 sq mi)
- Highest elevation: 100 m (330 ft)
- Lowest elevation: 0 m (0 ft)
- Population (2023): 745
  - Density: 111/km^{2} (288/sq mi)
- Time zone: UTC+01:00 (CET)
  - Summer (DST): UTC+02:00 (CEST)
- INSEE/Postal code: 17207 /17111
- ^{1} French Land Register data, which excludes lakes, ponds, glaciers > 1 km^{2} (0.386 sq mi or 247 acres) and river estuaries.

Loix (French pronunciation: [lwa]) is a commune in the south-west of France, located on the north coast of the Île de Ré, in the department of Charente-Maritime (region Nouvelle-Aquitaine).

== Geography ==
- Loix is the smallest village and has the smallest port of the island of Ré, and is located in the middle of the salt marshes. It is a peninsula in the island, bordered by the Pier of Ars to the west and the pit of Loix to the east. Only a road, bordered by marshes (and salt marshes) gained over the sea by containment, connects Loix to the rest of the island.
- Low shore, pebbles, bay and small beach in the shape of cove in the south east (pit of Loix).
- At sea, a lighthouse : the Ilates.

== Toponymy ==
The origin of the name of the commune seems rather vague.

According to the historian Louis-Étienne Arcère, "A decree of Charles V of the year 1372, gives to the Island the name of Loys"

It may be noted, however, that in relation to the ancient island on which the locality is located, it bore the names of Loye (1684 and 1757) and Oye (1675).

== History ==
In 1627, English forces led by the Duke of Buckingham besieged the island. On the 8th of November of that year, at the place called "Feneau", the English were caught in their retreat from the Siege of Saint-Martin-de-Ré. The French and English forces then fought the Battle of the Pont du Feneau, which ended the English invasion. Jean Caylar d'Anduze de Saint-Bonnet, called Toiras, along with the fleet of Louis XIII and Richelieu, repelled the forces of Buckingham, forcing him to abandon the siege and return to England.

== Population ==
Its inhabitants are called Loidais and Loidaises in French.

Historical population
Year	Pop.	±% p.a.
1968	439	—
1975	470	+0.98%
1982	433	−1.16%
1990	561	+3.29%
1999	619	+1.10%
2007	715	+1.82%
2012	674	−1.17%
2017	729	+1.58%
2023	745	+0.36%
Source: INSEE

== See also ==
- Communes of the Charente-Maritime department
