= Henri de Schomberg =

Marshal of France (1575–1632)

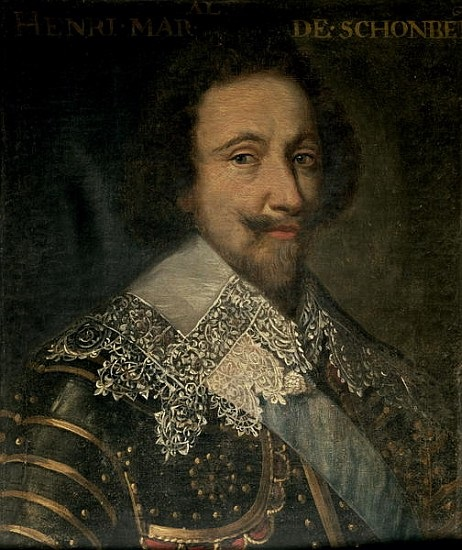
Henri de Schomberg (1575 - 17 November 1632).

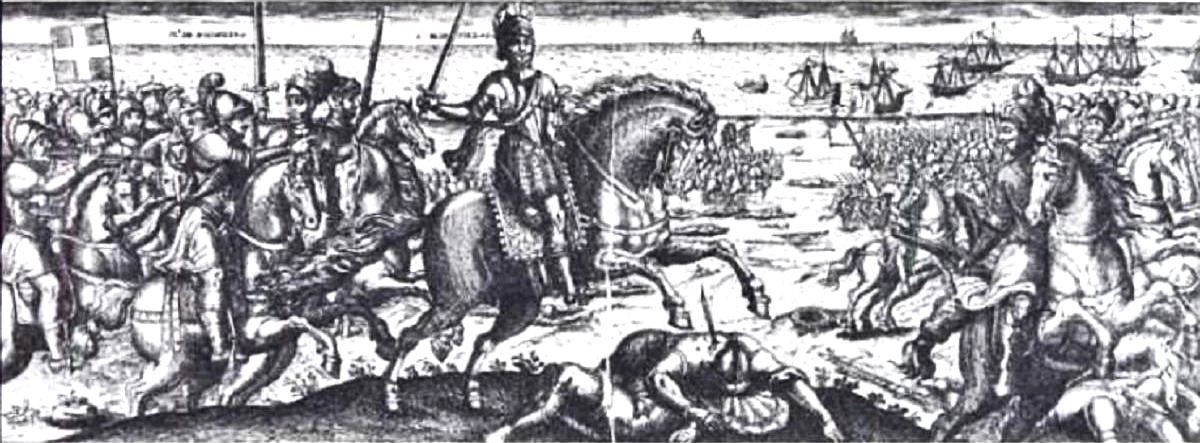
Marshall Henri de Schomberg and Toiras vanquishing the English army of Buckingham at the end of the siege. Michel de la Mathonière, 1627.

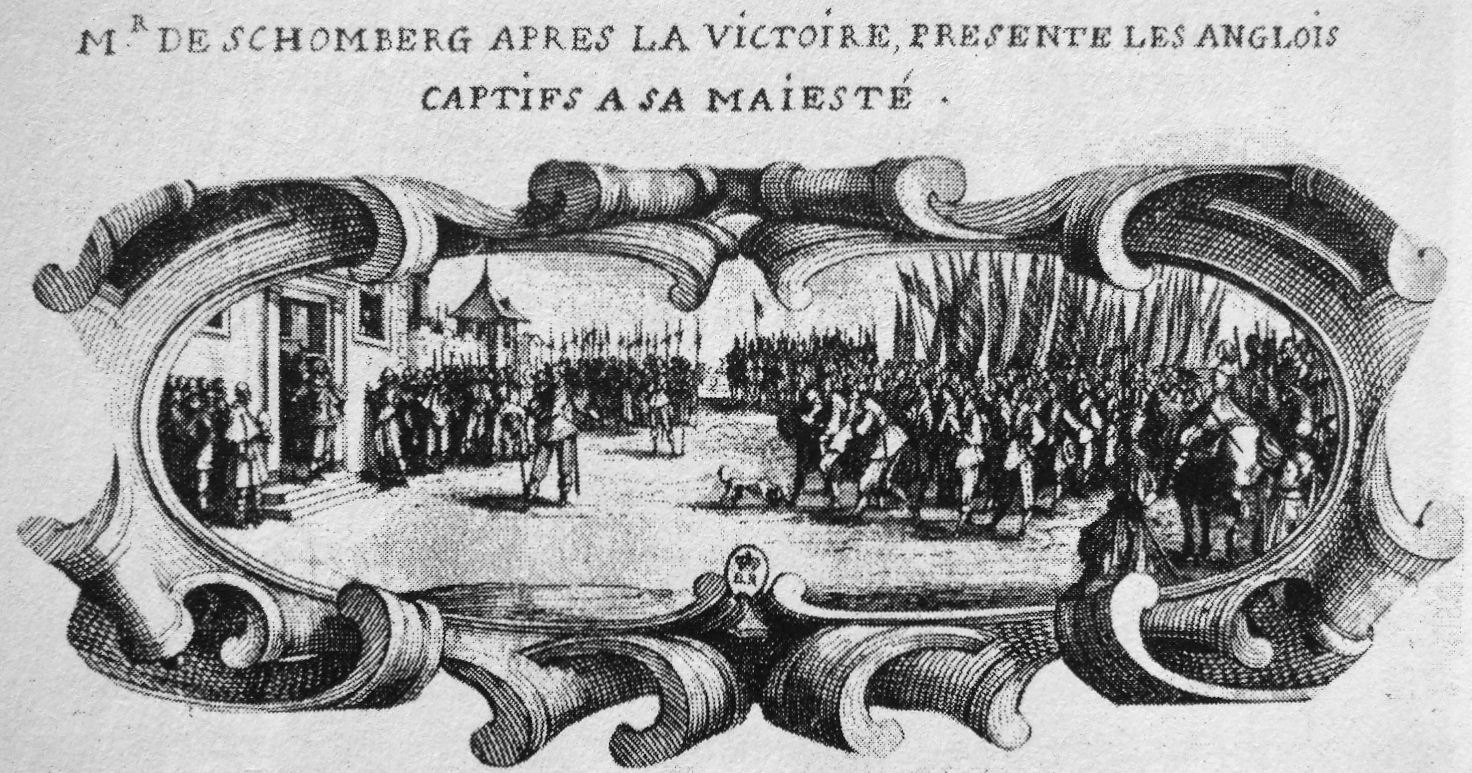
Schomberg presenting English captives to the King.

Henri de Schomberg, Comte de Nanteuil (1575 – 17 November 1632), was a Marshal of France during the reign of Louis XIII.

== Biography ==
Schomberg was born in Paris. He served as the Superintendent of Finances from 1619 to 1623. He became a Marshal of France in 1625.

In 1628, Schomberg rescued Toiras in the Siege of Saint-Martin-de-Ré with an army of 6,000 men and some cavalry. Together with Toiras, he pursued the retreating English army of the Duke of Buckingham, with great losses being sustained by the latter.

Henri de Schomberg commanded Royal troops against the Huguenot rebellions, at the Siege of Privas.

In 1632 he defeated Henri II de Montmorency at the battle of Castelnaudary (1 September 1632). He died soon after, of apoplexy, on 17 November of that year in Bordeaux.

== Family ==
He married Françoise d'Espinay, daughter of Claude d'Espinay in 1598 with. She died on 16 January 1602, and had 2 children:

- Charles de Schomberg (1601–1656), Marshal of France.
- Jeanne (1601–1674), married François de Cossé, Duke of Brissac, and later Roger, Duke de la Roche-Guyon.

He remarried Anne de La Guiche (died in 1663), and had:

- Jeanne-Armande (1632–1706), married Charles II, son of Louis VIII, Prince of Guéméné.

== See also ==
- List of finance ministers of France
