= Treaty of Paris (1626) =

1626 treaty

The Treaty of Paris (1626) was a peace agreement between king Louis XIII and the Huguenots following the outbreak of the Second Huguenot rebellion and the Capture of Ré island.

The Treaty of Paris was signed between the city of La Rochelle and Louis XIII on 5 February 1626, preserving religious freedom but imposing some guaranties against possible future upheavals: La Rochelle was prohibited from keeping a war fleet and had to destroy a fort in Tasdon. The contentious Fort Louis under Royal control near the western gate of the city was supposed to be destroyed "in reasonable time".
