= Louis de Marillac =

French noble and military leader

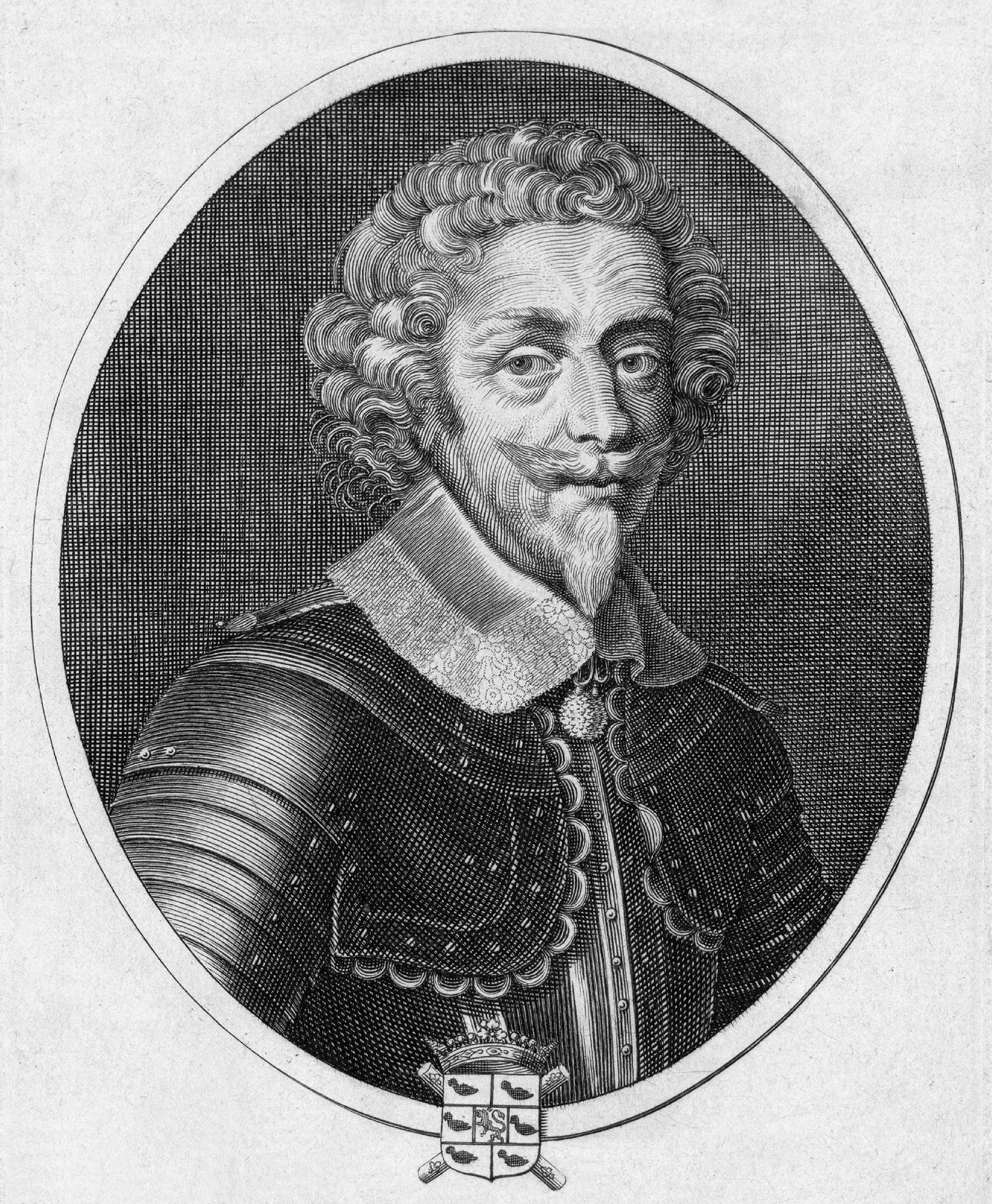

Jean-Louis de Marillac, comte de Beaumont-le-Roger (1572 – 10 May 1632) was an important French noble and military leader during the reign of Louis XIII. He held the office of Marshal of France, as well as lieutenant-general of Trois-Évêchés and governor of Metz.

== Biography ==
=== Early life ===
The Marillacs, the family of Louis de Marillac, were a family of former low and robe nobility. Guillaume de Marillac, Louis's father, was valet of the chamber to Henry II who first appointed him Superintendent of the Finances of Paris, then Superintendent des comptes and finally Controller-General of Finances.

Louis's mother was Geneviève de Boislevêque, the former widow of a Maître des requêtes.

Louis's elder half-brother from his father's first marriage was Michel de Marillac, who went on to become Superintendent of Finances and Keeper of the Seals.

=== Career ===
As many other nobles, Louis was trained in strategy. He had his first assignments under Henry IV: At Amiens, he commanded a company of 100 Cheveau-légers. Due to his splendid service, the king appointed him Gentleman of the Chamber. After Henry IV's death in 1610, Louis remained a prominent person at court.

From 1611 to 1616 he was ambassador to several countries and negotiated the Treaty of Loudun.

In 1617, Louis XIII appointed him Commissioner General of the Camps and Armies. In 1621, at the Siege of Montauban he was appointed Maréchal de camp.

During the king's war with the Huguenots, Marillac was an important participator. He participated in every action against the Huguenots in Languedoc till the Peace of Montpellier.

After the reconciliation of Louis XIII with the queen mother in 1620, Louis de Marillac was given many high and honourable positions, including captain of the Queen's guards and lieutenant-general of the Three bishoprics (Trois-Évêchés). This was because of Louis de Marillac standing in high favour of Marie de Medici and Louis XIII seeking for a harmless way of pleasing her. As Louis de Marillac was one of the persons Louis XIII liked too, he did it rather than to other favourites of Marie de Medici. Due to his dévot position and his support for Marie de Medici and especially Gaston, Duke of Orléans after the Day of Dupes, the king arrested Marillac while he was in Savoy as a military commander at the Mantuan War of Succession.

Despite heavy protests and riots (for Marillac was considered as a very religious and honest man) he was decapitated on 10 May 1632 at the Place de Grève in Paris.

After Louis XIII's death, Louis de Marillac was rehabilitated by the Parlement of Paris.

== In popular culture ==
Louis de Marillac was the uncle of St. Louise de Marillac, an important saint of 17th century France. However, his elder brother Louis only claimed to be her brother and it is more likely that one of his younger and experienced brothers was her father. So, possibly the younger Louis was her father.
