= Siege of Saint-Martin-de-Ré =

Battle

Siege of Saint-Martin-de-Ré (Siège de Saint-Martin-de-Ré)
- Part of the Anglo-French War (1627–1629)
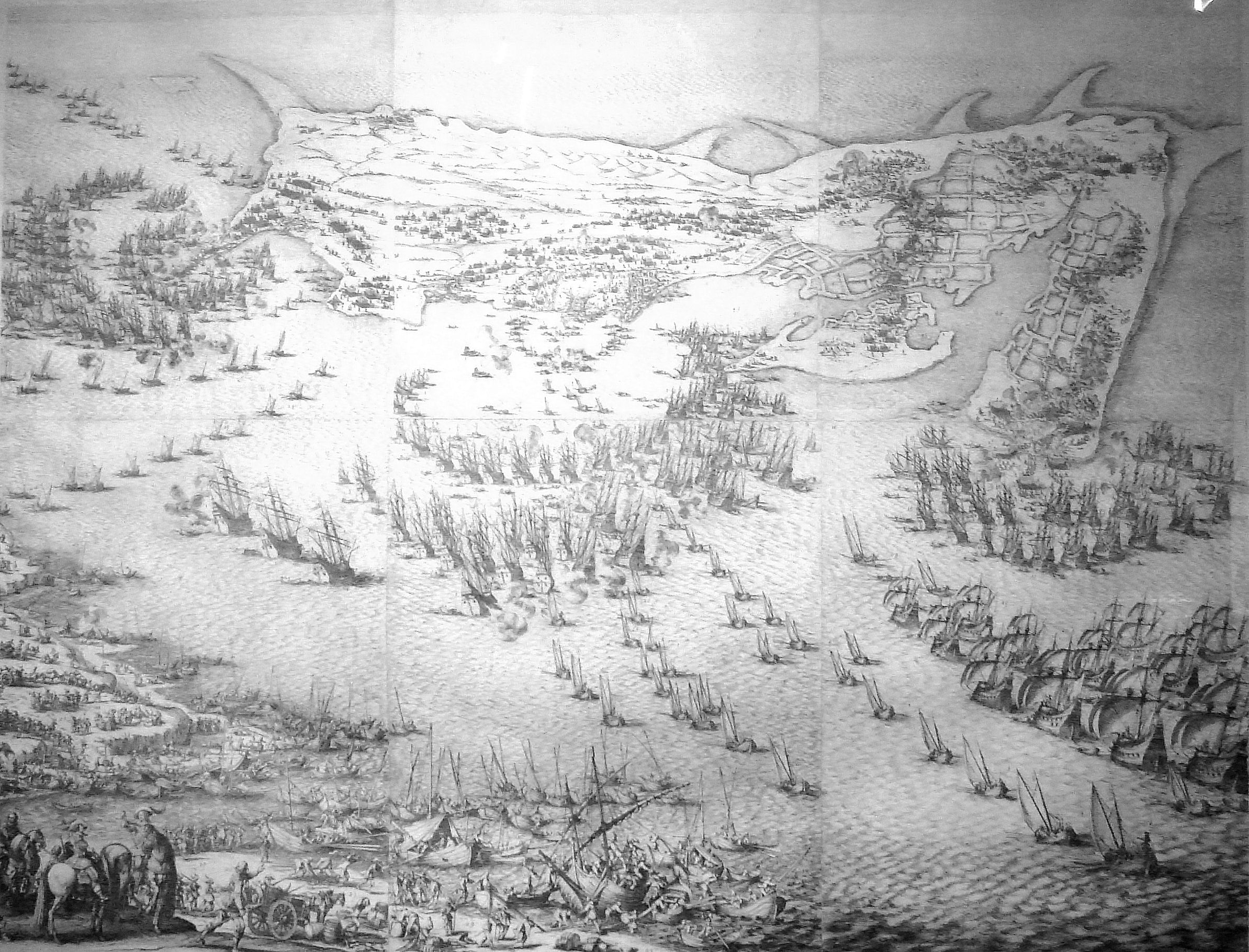
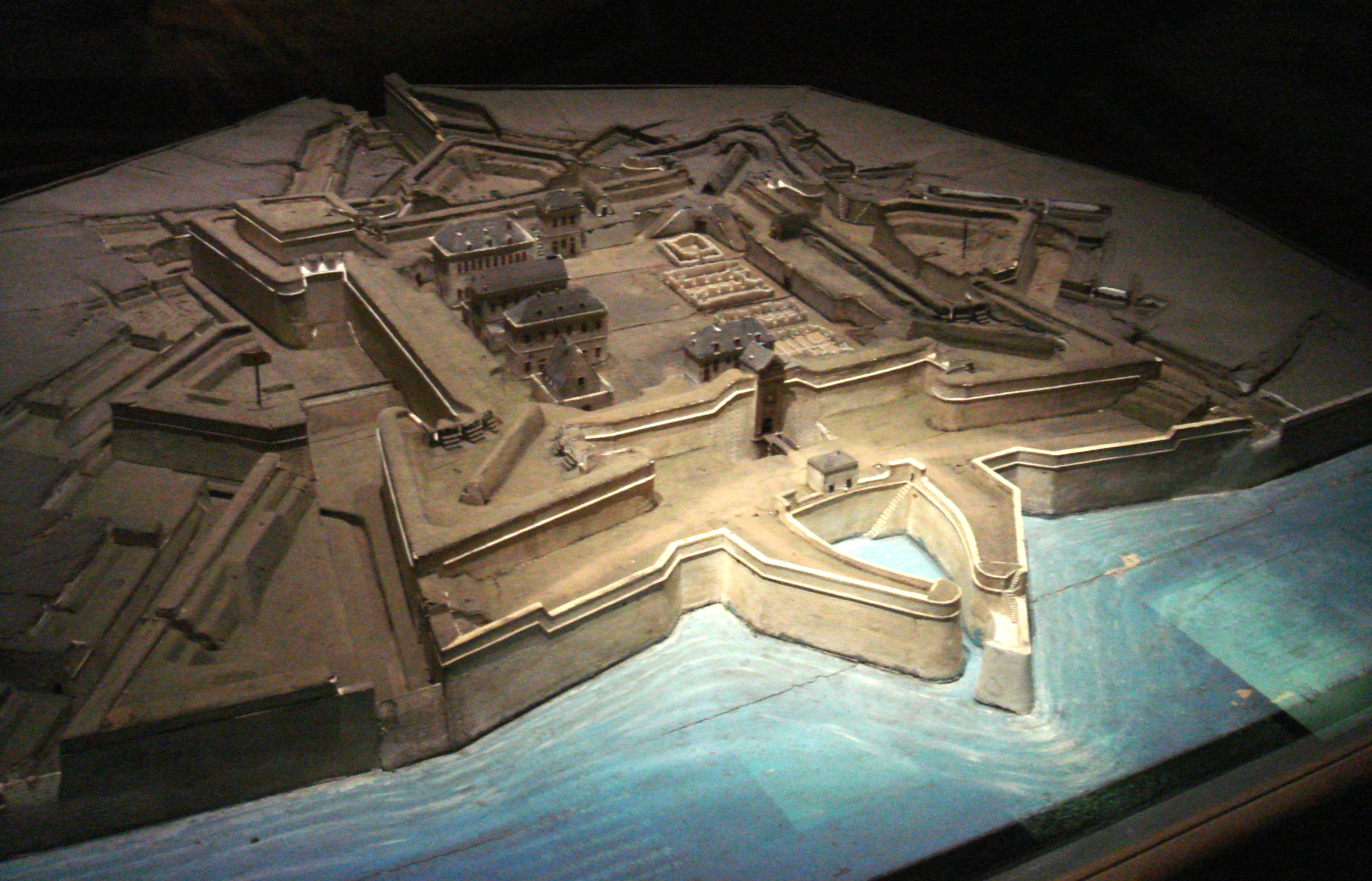
- Top: Full map of the landing, siege and retreat by the English forces of Buckingham. Bottom: The fortress of Saint-Martin. Military mock-up, 1702. Musée des Plans-Reliefs.
Date	1627
Location	Île de Ré 46.2031°N 1.3672°W
Result	French victory

Belligerents
England: Ireland; La Rochelle Huguenots Scotland	France

Commanders and leaders
(Kingdom of Great Britain) Charles I (Kingdom of England) Duke of Buckingham	(Kingdom of France) Louis XIII (Kingdom of France) Toiras

Strength
Initially: 100 ships 6,000 English soldiers 1,000 horses 4 cannons La Rochelle volunteers: 800 Reinforcements: 2,000 Irish soldiers 400 raw troops	Initially: 1,200 men 200 horsemen Reinforcements: 4,000 men (October)

Casualties and losses
Around 5,000	Around 500

The siege of Saint-Martin-de-Ré, or siege of St. Martin's (French: siège de Saint-Martin-de-Ré), was an attempt by English forces under George Villiers, the Duke of Buckingham, to capture the French fortress-city of Saint-Martin-de-Ré, on the isle of Ré (near La Rochelle), in 1627. After three months of siege, the Marquis de Toiras and a relief force of French ships and troops managed to repel the Duke, who was forced to withdraw in defeat. The encounter followed another defeat for Buckingham, the 1625 Cádiz expedition, and is considered to be the opening conflict of the Anglo-French War of 1627–1629.

== Landing ==
On 12 July 1627, an English force of 100 ships and 6,000 soldiers, having previously departed from Plymouth Sound, under the command of the Duke of Buckingham invaded the Île de Ré, landing at the beach of Sablanceau, with the objective of controlling the approaches to La Rochelle and encouraging rebellion in the city. Buckingham hoped to capture the Fort of La Prée and the fortified city of Saint-Martin-de-Ré. A Royal French force of 1,200 infantry and 200 horsemen under the Marquis de Toiras, the island's Governor, resisted the landing from behind the dunes, but the English beachhead was maintained, with over 12 officers and 100 men killed.

During a period of three days in which Buckingham consolidated his beachhead, Toiras took all available provisions on the island and fortified himself in the citadel of Saint Martin. Buckingham endeavoured to establish a siege around the citadel, but that proved difficult; the English siege engineer had drowned during the landing, the cannon were too few and too small and, as autumn arrived, disease started to take its toll on the English troops. The siege continued until October.

== Reinforcements ==
Requested supplies from England proved insufficient. Two thousand Irish troops arrived under Sir Ralph Bingley on 3 September 1627. A small supply fleet under Sir William Beecher arrived with only 400 raw troops.

A Scottish fleet composed of 30 ships, with 5,000 men, was on its way in October 1627, but was broken up by a storm on the coast of Norfolk. A strong relief fleet under the Earl of Holland only departed on 6 November 1627, which proved to be too late.

The French, despite difficulties, managed to get small amounts of supplies through to the defenders throughout the siege – in August, Cardinal Richelieu offered a reward of 30,000 livres to the first ship captain to deliver 50 barrels of corn, flour, or biscuits to the citadel. Finally, a large supply fleet arrived on 7–8 October, with 29 out of 35 ships eluding the English naval blockade. This was in the nick of time as Toiras had already declared he would be unable to hold out after this date of not being resupplied.

From the mainland, 4,000 additional troops were landed on the southern end of the island on 20 October. The rescue troops were under the Marshal of France Henri de Schomberg.

== Final assault and retreat ==
On 27 October Buckingham attempted a last desperate attack on Saint Martin, but the English ladders turned out to be too short to scale the walls, and the fortress again proved impregnable.

Although there were indications that the Saint Martin French garrison was also close to exhaustion, Buckingham finally retreated with his troops towards the northern part of the island, with the objective of embarking from the area of Loix. He was harassed by pursuing French troops, with heavy casualties. Altogether, Buckingham lost more than 5,000 men in the campaign, out of a force of 7,000.

== Aftermath ==
Two months into the siege, the people of La Rochelle finally started open hostilities against the central government of France in September, initiating the siege of La Rochelle.

Following the defeat of Buckingham in October, England attempted to send two fleets to relieve La Rochelle. The first one, led by William Feilding, Earl of Denbigh, left in April 1628, but returned without a fight to Portsmouth, as Denbigh "said that he had no commission to hazard the king's ship in a fight and returned shamefully to Portsmouth".

After returning to England, Buckingham tried to organise a second campaign to relieve the siege of La Rochelle, but he was stabbed and killed at Portsmouth on 23 August 1628 by John Felton, an army officer who had been wounded in the earlier military adventure and believed he had been passed over for promotion by Buckingham. Felton was hanged in November and Buckingham was buried in Westminster Abbey. However at the time of his death, Buckingham was a widely hated figure amongst the public; Felton was popularly acclaimed as a hero for assassinating him.

The second fleet was dispatched soon after Buckingham's death, under the Admiral of the Fleet, the Earl of Lindsey in August, but remained blocked by the seawall in front of La Rochelle. Exhausted and without hope of outside support anymore, La Rochelle finally surrendered to French Royal forces on 28 October. Following these defeats, England would end its involvement with the Thirty Years War by negotiating peace treaties with France in 1629 and with Spain in 1630, to the dismay of Protestant forces on the continent.

Following these conflicts, the main port of Saint Martin, was further fortified by Vauban in 1681.

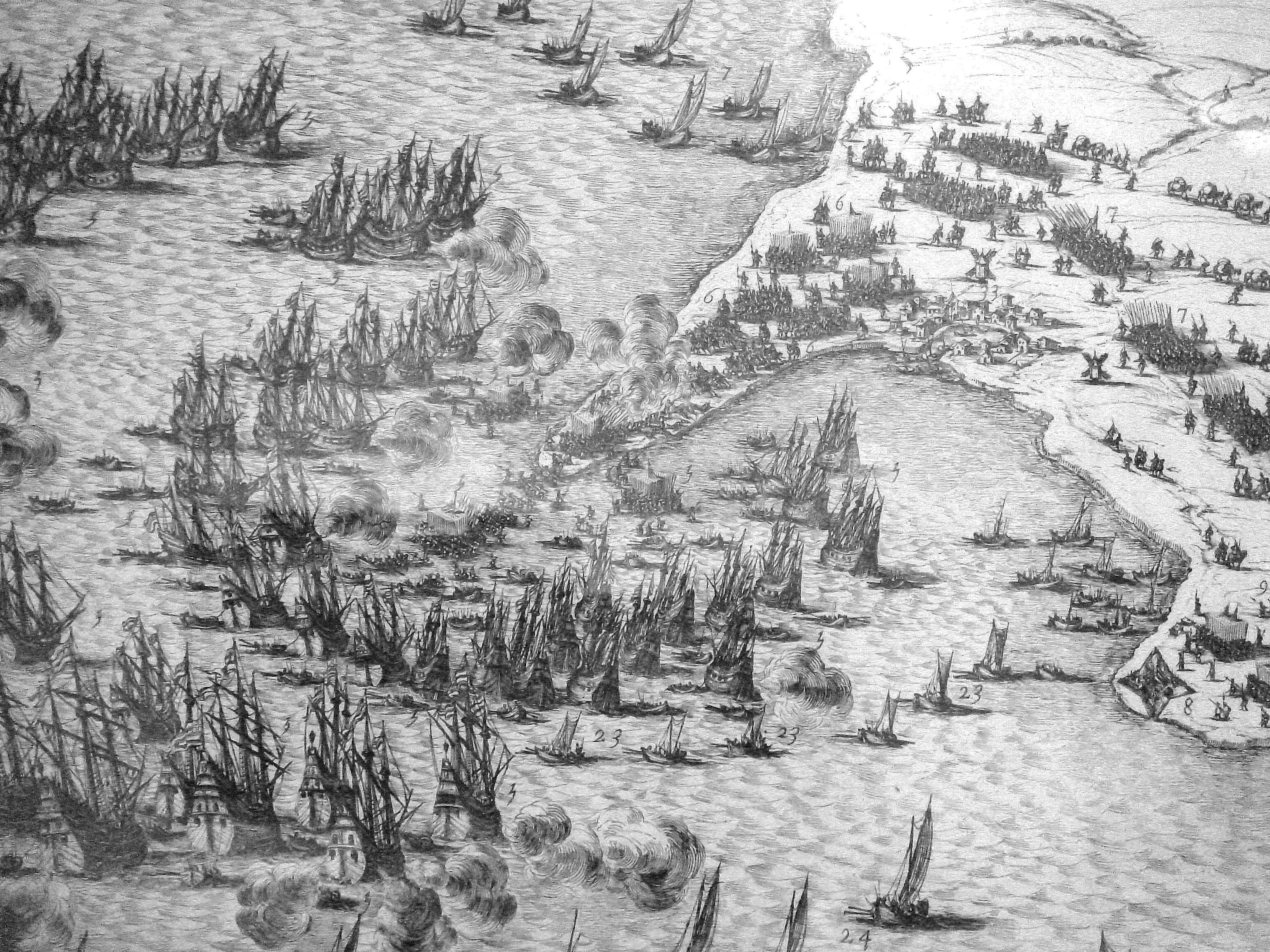
Landing of Buckingham in Sablanceau (detail).

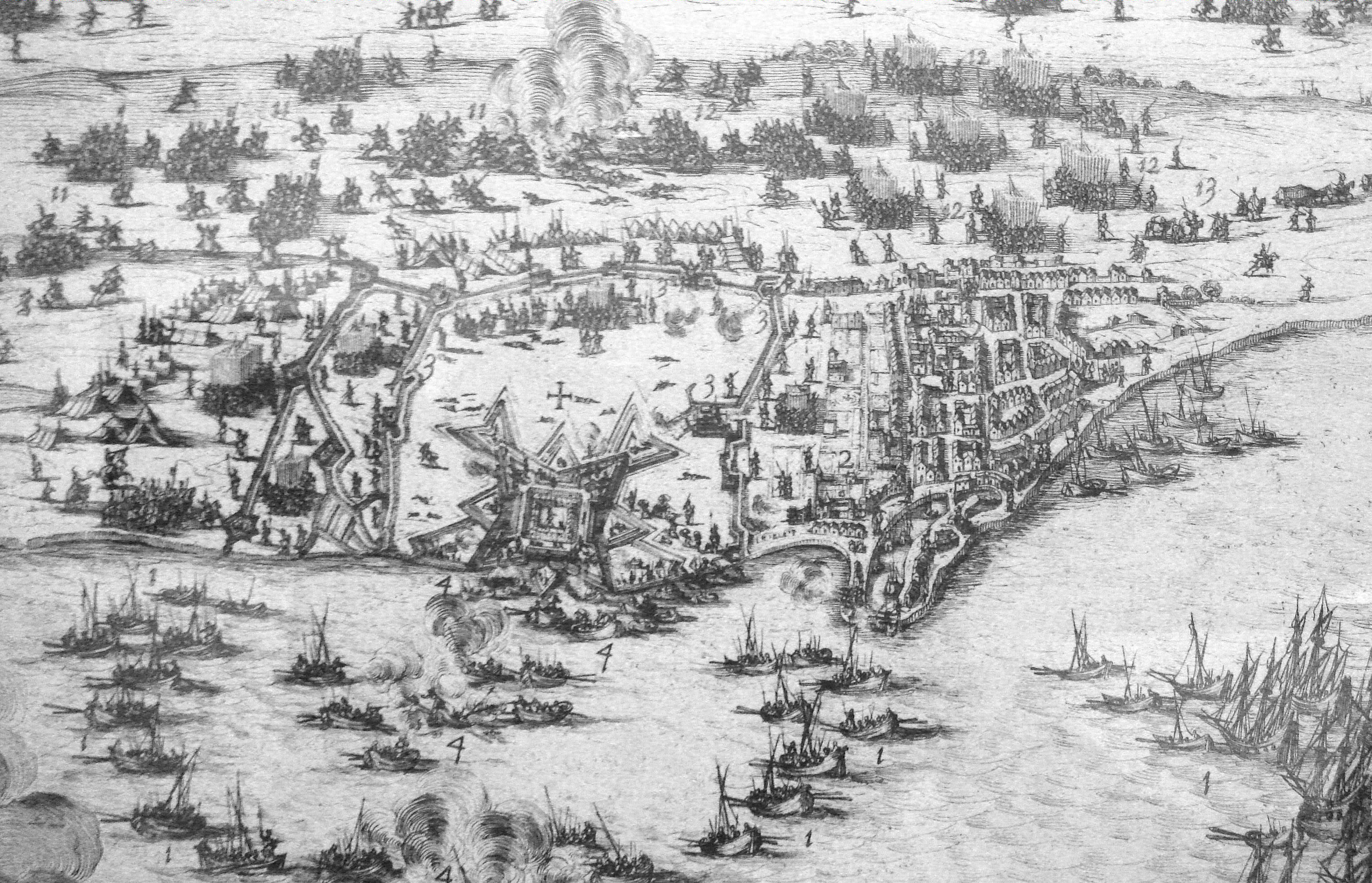
English forces besieging the citadel of Saint-Martin-de-Ré (detail).

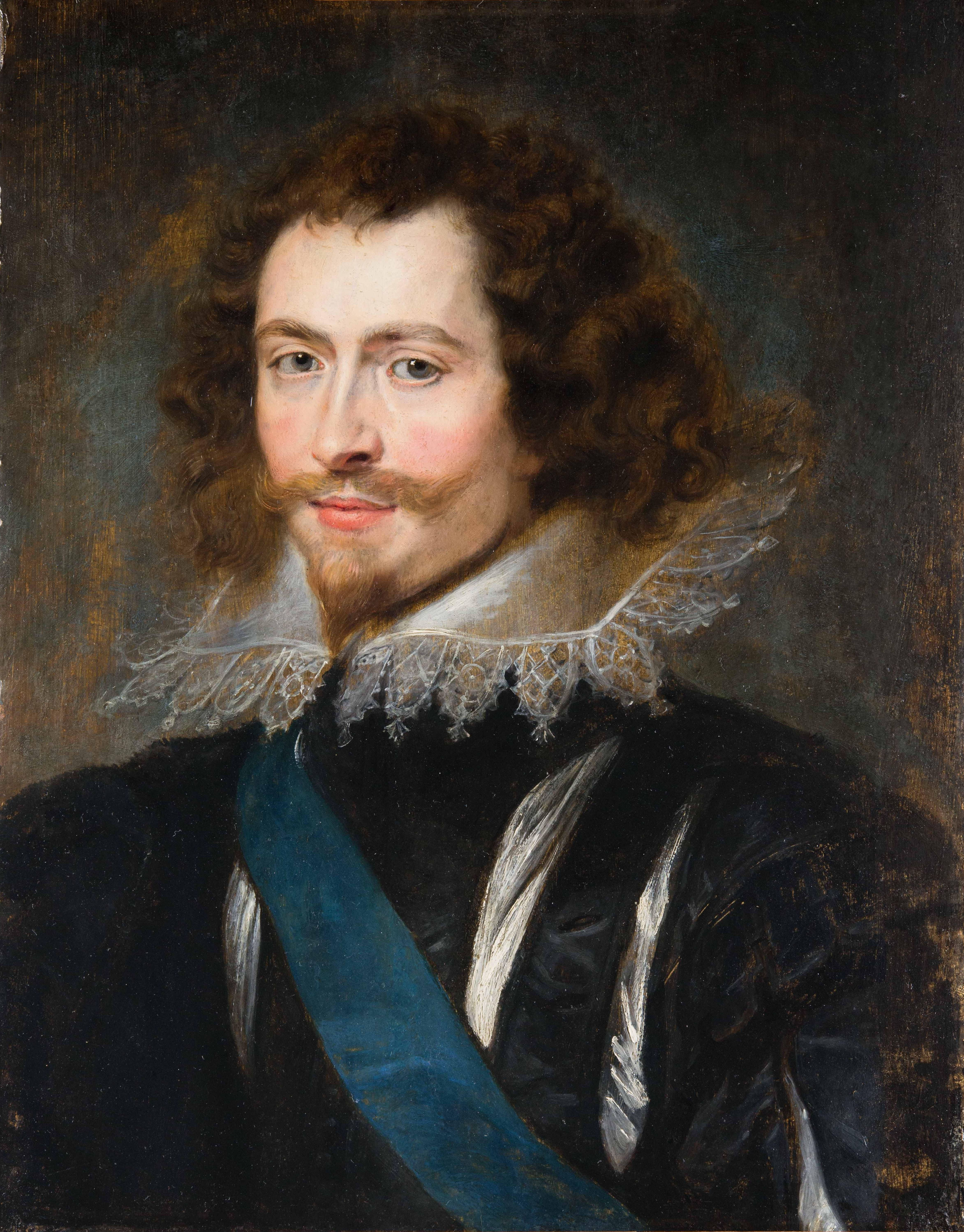
The Duke of Buckingham had to retreat in defeat.

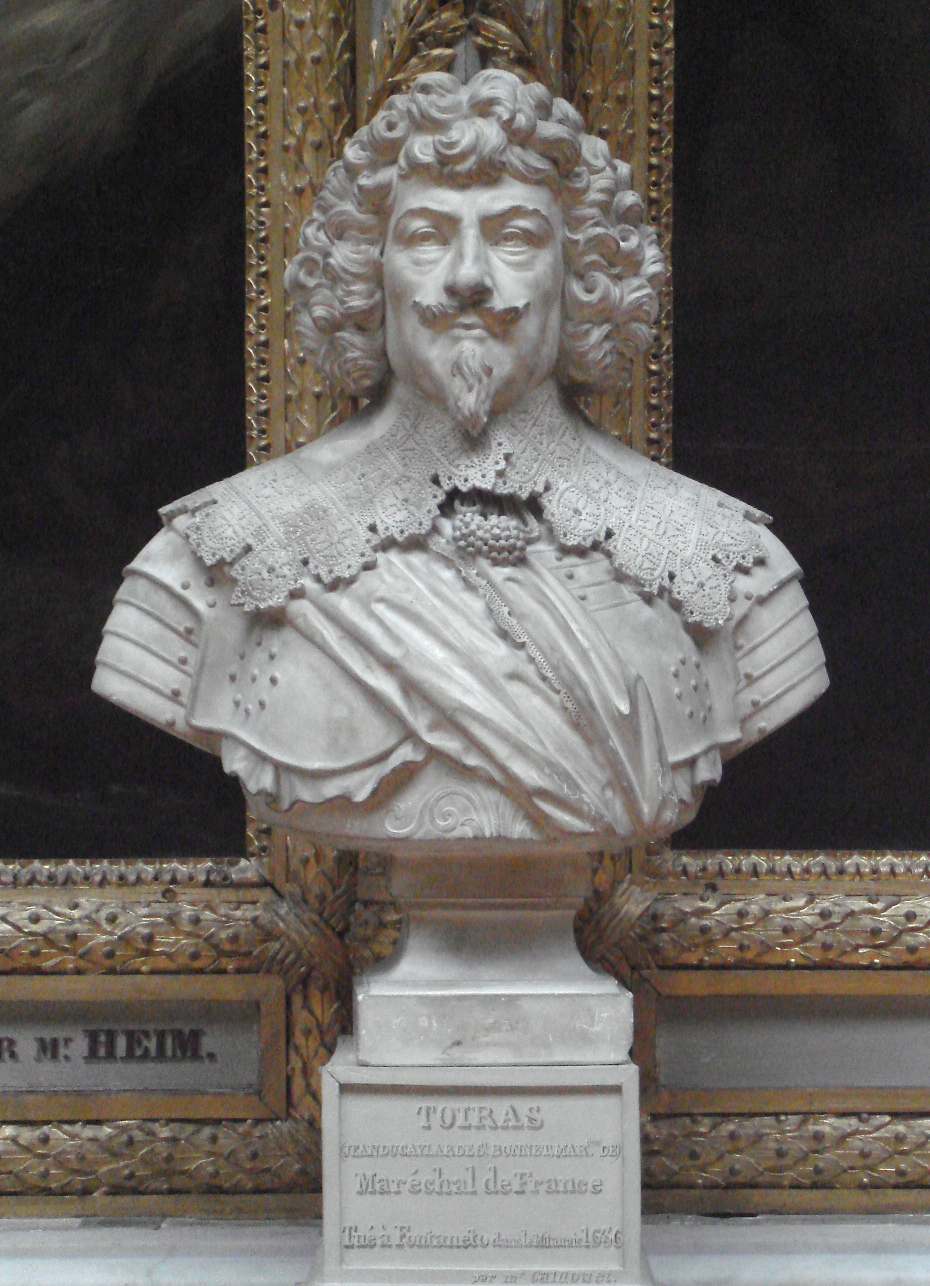
The Governor of Île de Ré (and future Marshal of France) Toiras led the defense of Saint-Martin-de-Ré. Versailles.

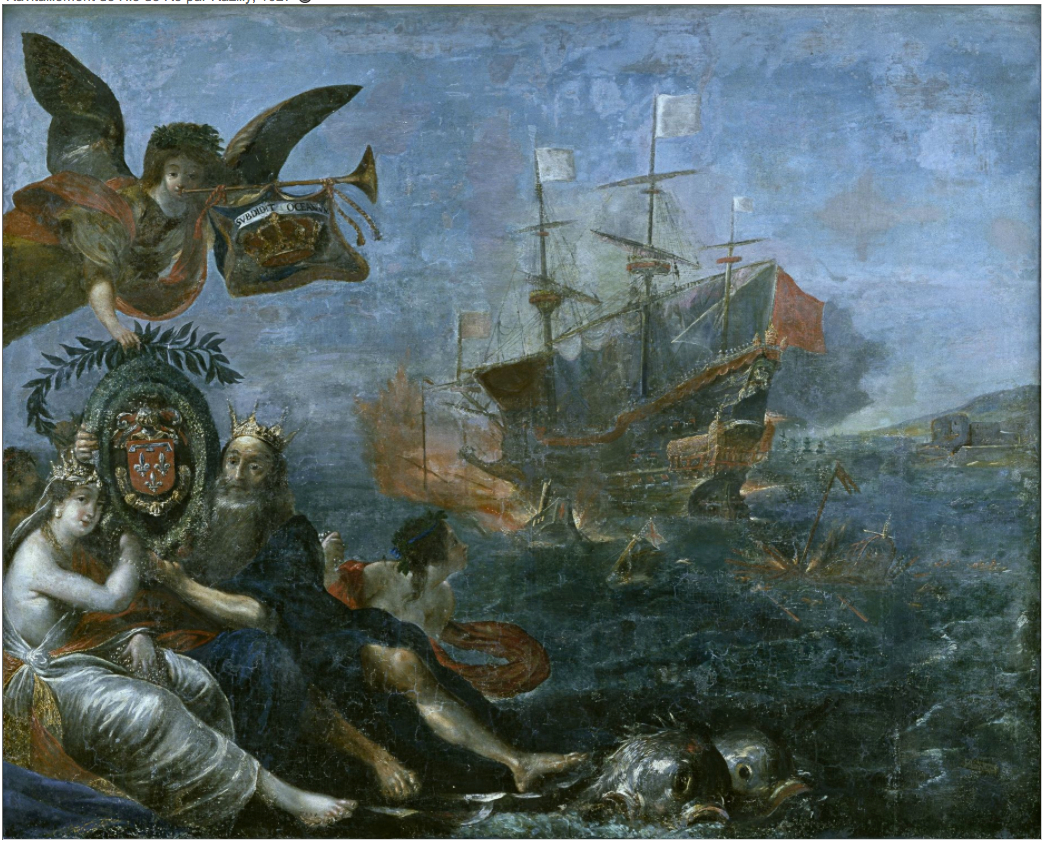
Successful resupply of Ile de Ré by Claude de Razilly in 1627, painted by Claude Vignon (1642).

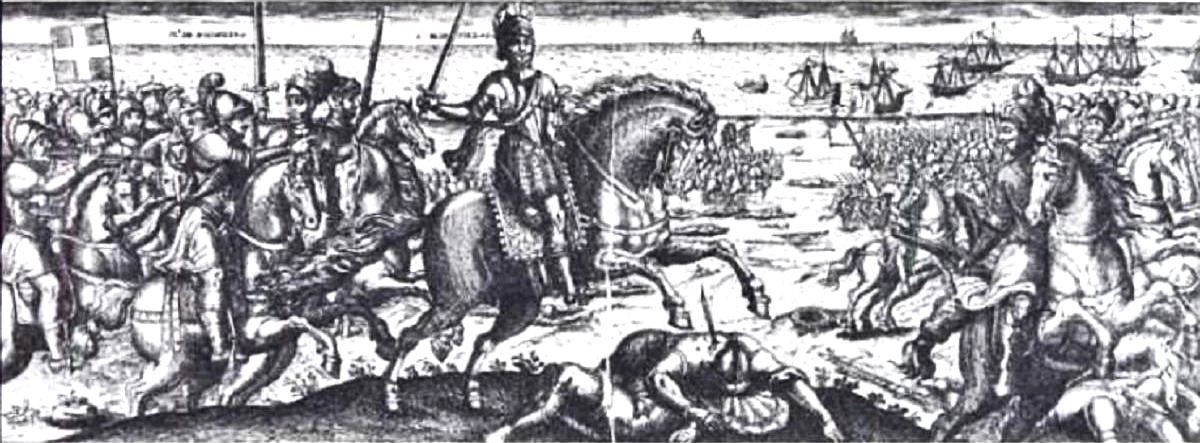
Marshall Henri de Schomberg and Toiras vanquishing the English army of Buckingham at the end of the siege. Michel de la Mathonière, 1627.

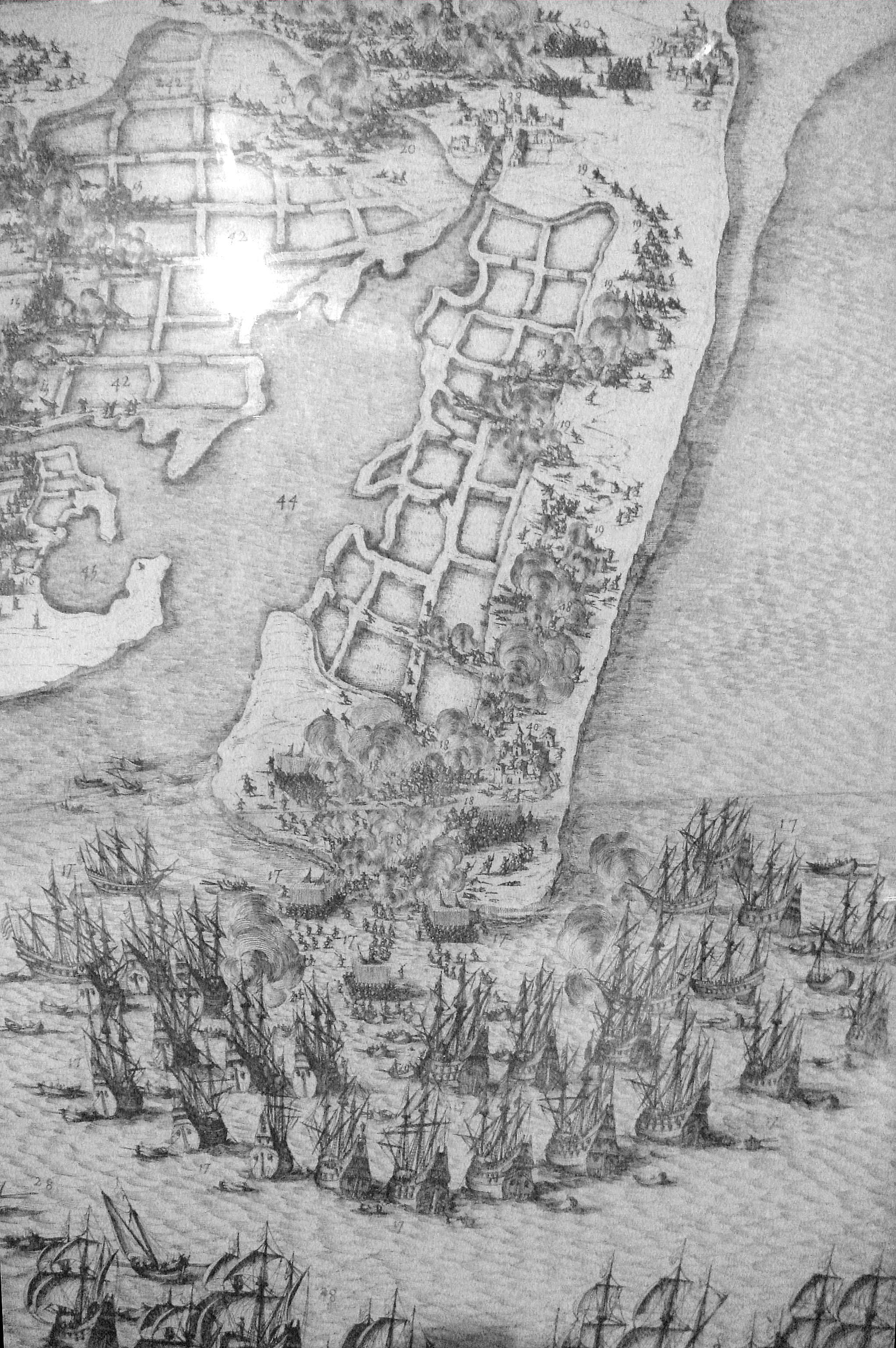
Retreat and reimbarkment of Buckingham in Loix.

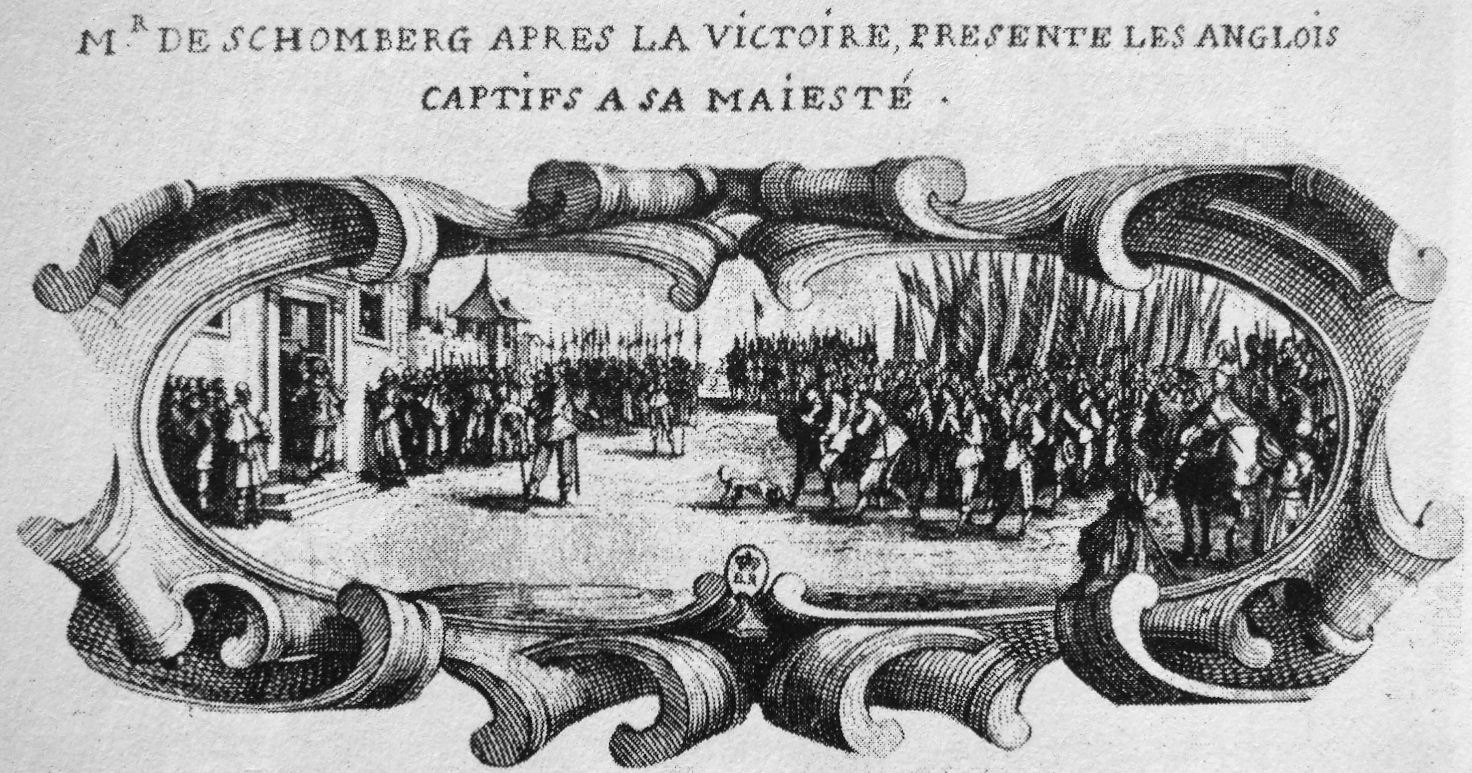
Schomberg presenting English captives to the King.

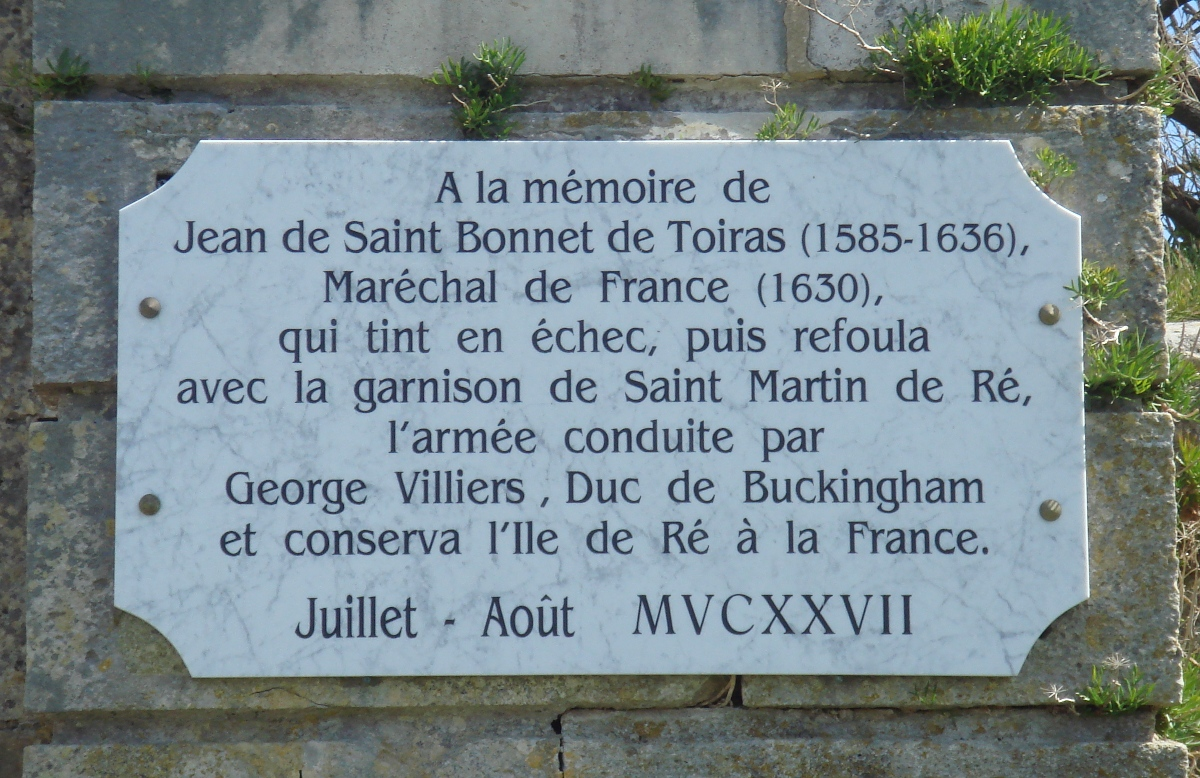
Plaque to Toiras, defender of Saint-Martin-de-Ré.

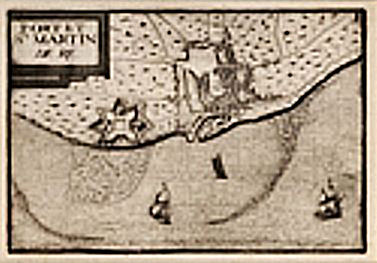
Map of Saint-Martin-de-Ré, with fortress (left) and city (right), 17th century, before the enlarged fortifications around the city by Vauban in 1681.

== See also ==
- Battle of Pont du Feneau
