= Saint-Martin-de-Ré =

- Commune
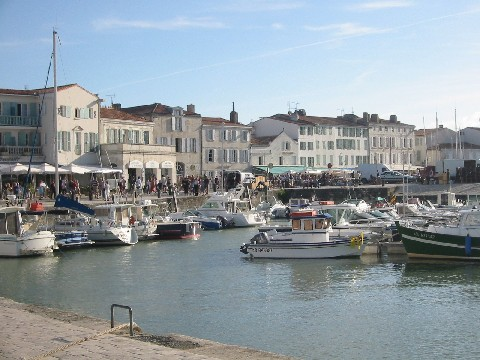
- The quays

- Coat of arms
- Location of Saint-Martin-de-Ré
- Location within France Location within Nouvelle-Aquitaine
- Coordinates: 46°12′11″N 1°22′02″W
- Country: France
- Region: Nouvelle-Aquitaine
- Department: Charente-Maritime
- Arrondissement: La Rochelle
- Canton: Île de Ré
- Intercommunality: Île de Ré

Government
  - Mayor (2020–2026): Patrice Déchelette
- Area^{1}: 4.70 km^{2} (1.81 sq mi)
- Elevation: 8 m (26 ft)
- Highest elevation: 17 m (56 ft)
- Lowest elevation: 0 m (0 ft)
- Population (2023): 2,355
  - Density: 501/km^{2} (1,300/sq mi)
- Time zone: UTC+01:00 (CET)
  - Summer (DST): UTC+02:00 (CEST)
- INSEE/Postal code: 17369 /17410
- ^{1} French Land Register data, which excludes lakes, ponds, glaciers > 1 km^{2} (0.386 sq mi or 247 acres) and river estuaries.

Saint-Martin-de-Ré (French pronunciation: [sɛ̃ maʁtɛ̃ də ʁe], lit. "St Martin of Ré"; Poitevin-Saintongeais: Sént-Martén-de-Rét; before 1962: Saint-Martin) is a commune in the western French department of Charente-Maritime.

It is one of the ten communes located on the Île de Ré.

The fortifications in Saint-Martin-de-Ré, drawn up by Vauban between 1681 and 1685, were inscribed on the UNESCO World Heritage List in 2008 for their testimony to Vauban's work and its influence on military strategy and architecture over the subsequent 200 years.

== History ==
=== Fortifications ===
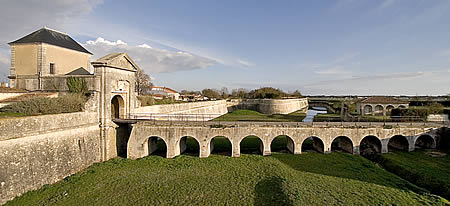
Ditch and fortifications in Saint-Martin-de-Ré

Saint-Martin-de-Ré has extensive fortifications, reflecting the strategic importance of the Île de Ré. During the Huguenot Rebellions of the 1620s, Cardinal Richelieu ordered that the island be fortified as a counterweight to the nearby Protestant city of La Rochelle on the French mainland. This included a citadel at Saint-Martin. After La Rochelle had been subdued, Saint-Martin's fortifications were largely demolished to remove its potential threat to royal power.

In 1627, an English invasion force under the command of George Villiers, Duke of Buckingham attacked the island in order to relieve the Siege of La Rochelle. After three months of combat in the Siege of Saint-Martin-de-Ré against the French under Marshal Toiras, the Duke was forced to withdraw in defeat.

Later, in the 1670s, the French engineer, Vauban was commissioned to review and overhaul the island's defences and, as a result, Saint Martin was enclosed by extensive and modern walls and embankments. This was done in three major phases ending in 1702 and the result was an enclosed town capable of housing the island's population for a long siege.

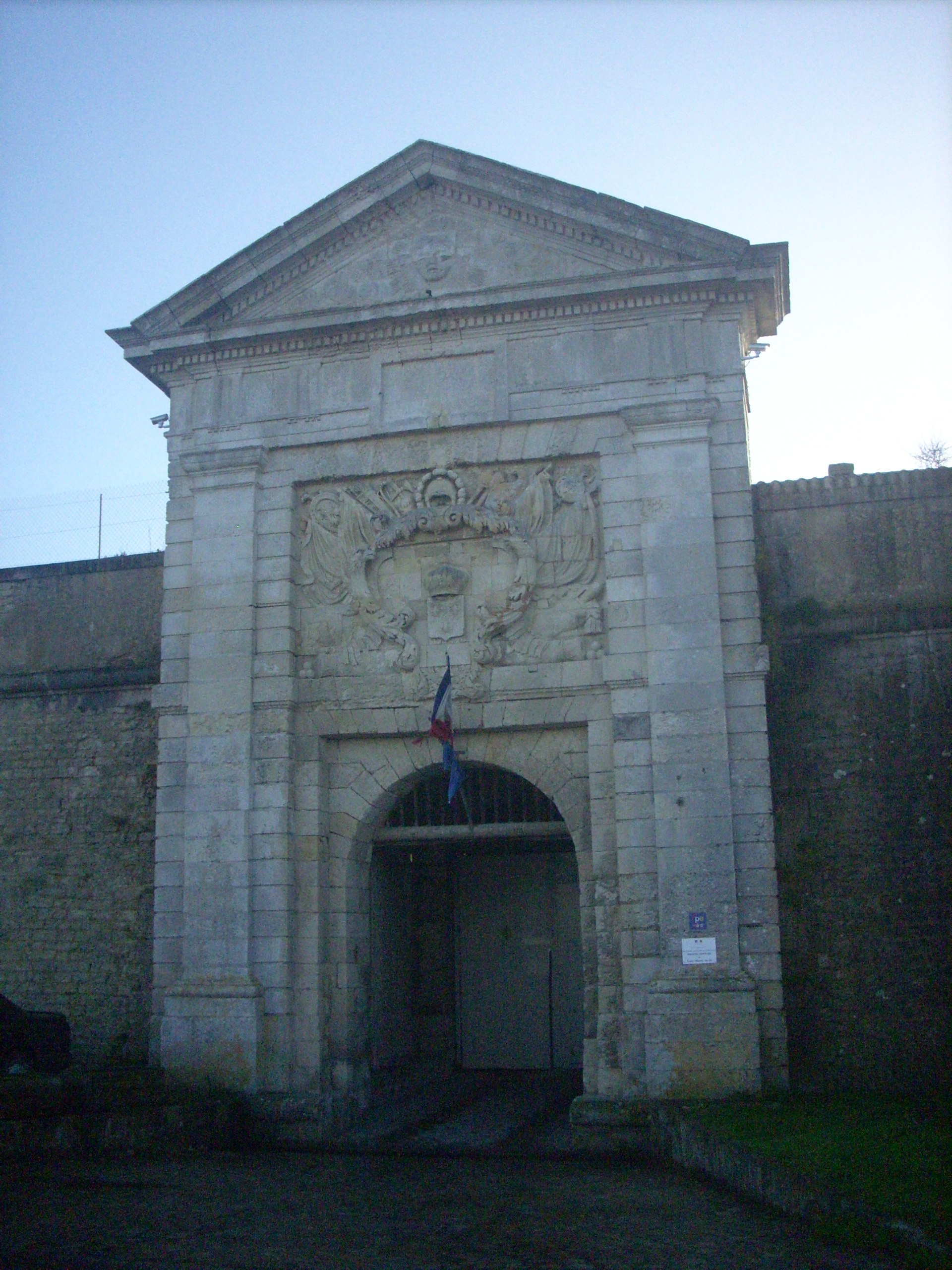
Prison gate in Saint-Martin

=== Prison to the penal colonies ===
Between 1873 and 1938, the prison in Saint-Martin-de-Ré kept prisoners before they were shipped to the penal colonies in French Guiana or New Caledonia. See penal colonies on Ré Island (in French).

== Population ==
The population of the commune has remained steady since 1800, although it was considerably larger during the French Revolution and dipped below 2000 from the 1920s to the 1940s.

The commune is the fifth-largest town on the island. With La Flotte, it forms a small urban area.

Historical population

| Year | Pop. | ±% p.a. |
|---|---|---|
| 1793 | 3,800 | — |
| 1800 | 2,723 | −4.65% |
| 1806 | 2,230 | −3.27% |
| 1821 | 2,333 | +0.30% |
| 1831 | 2,581 | +1.02% |
| 1836 | 2,523 | −0.45% |
| 1841 | 2,213 | −2.59% |
| 1846 | 2,349 | +1.20% |
| 1851 | 2,285 | −0.55% |
| 1856 | 2,212 | −0.65% |
| 1861 | 2,160 | −0.47% |
| 1866 | 2,121 | −0.36% |
| 1872 | 2,740 | +4.36% |
| 1876 | 2,699 | −0.38% |
| 1881 | 2,472 | −1.74% |
| 1886 | 2,838 | +2.80% |
| 1891 | 2,765 | −0.52% |
| 1896 | 2,459 | −2.32% |
| 1901 | 2,773 | +2.43% |

| Year | Pop. | ±% p.a. |
|---|---|---|
| 1906 | 2,380 | −3.01% |
| 1911 | 2,265 | −0.99% |
| 1921 | 1,965 | −1.41% |
| 1926 | 1,862 | −1.07% |
| 1931 | 1,427 | −5.18% |
| 1936 | 1,321 | −1.53% |
| 1946 | 1,406 | +0.63% |
| 1954 | 2,172 | +5.59% |
| 1962 | 2,262 | +0.51% |
| 1968 | 2,096 | −1.26% |
| 1975 | 2,135 | +0.26% |
| 1982 | 2,400 | +1.69% |
| 1990 | 2,512 | +0.57% |
| 1999 | 2,637 | +0.54% |
| 2007 | 2,588 | −0.23% |
| 2012 | 2,415 | −1.37% |
| 2017 | 2,231 | −1.57% |
| 2023 | 2,355 | +0.91% |

Source: EHESS and INSEE (1968-2023)

== Gallery ==
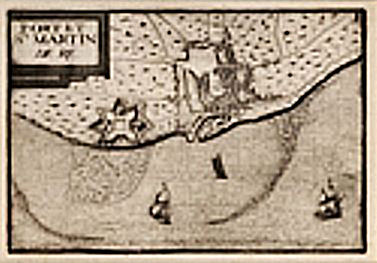
Map of Saint-Martin-de-Ré, with fortress and city, 17th century, before the enlarged fortifications of Vauban.

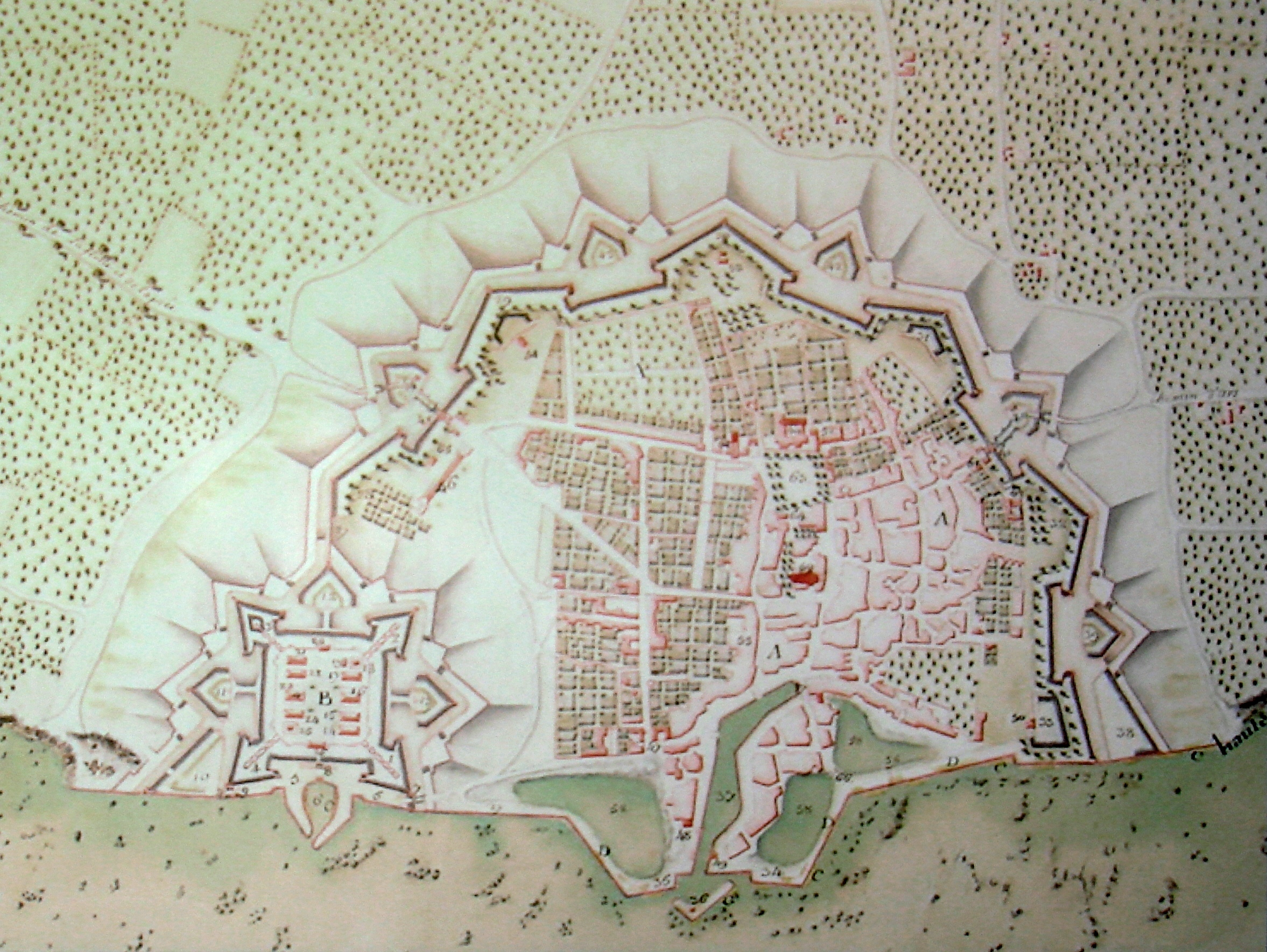
Map of Saint-Martin-de-Ré, after the fortifications of Vauban, 1722.

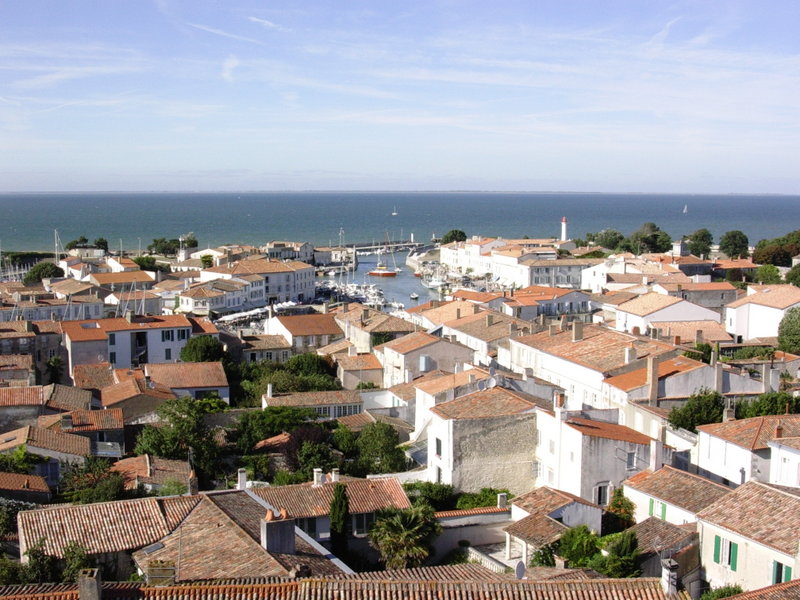

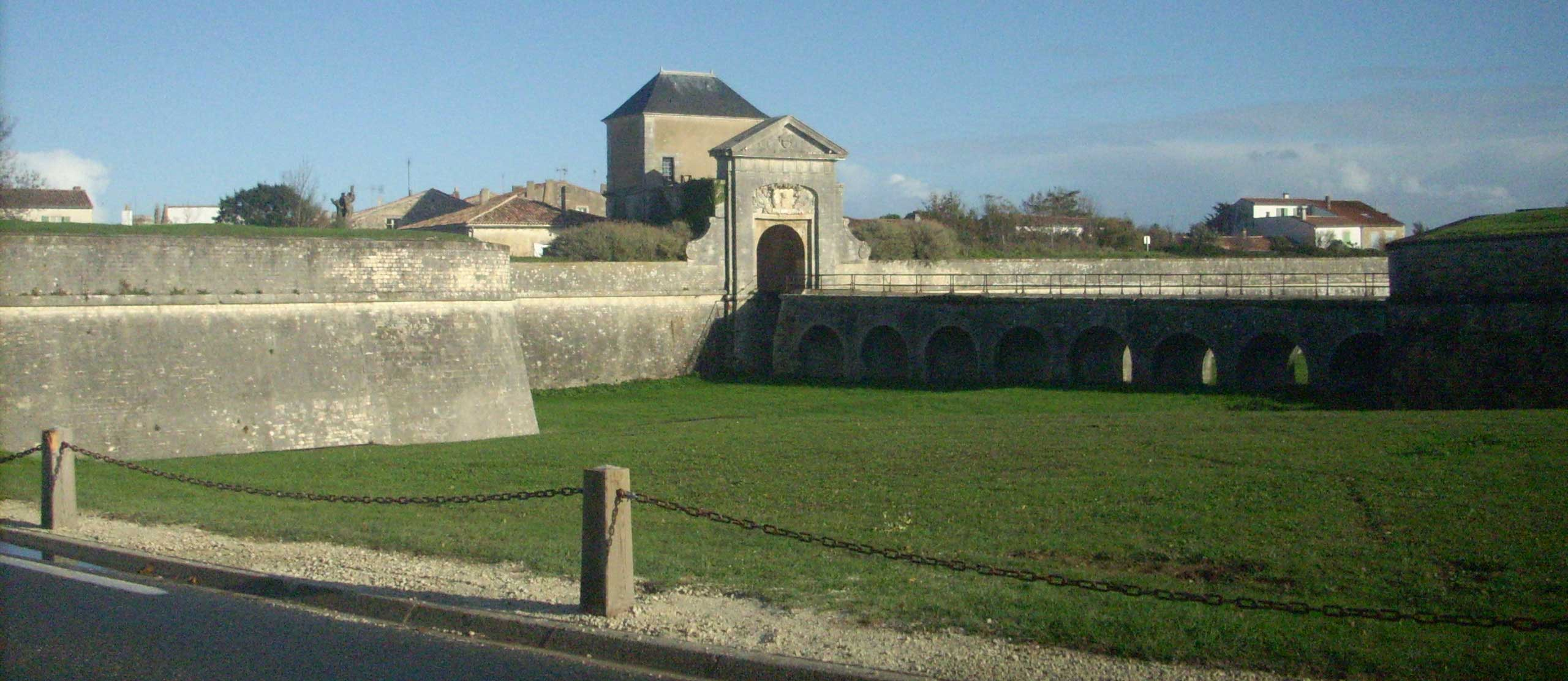
City gate in Saint-Martin

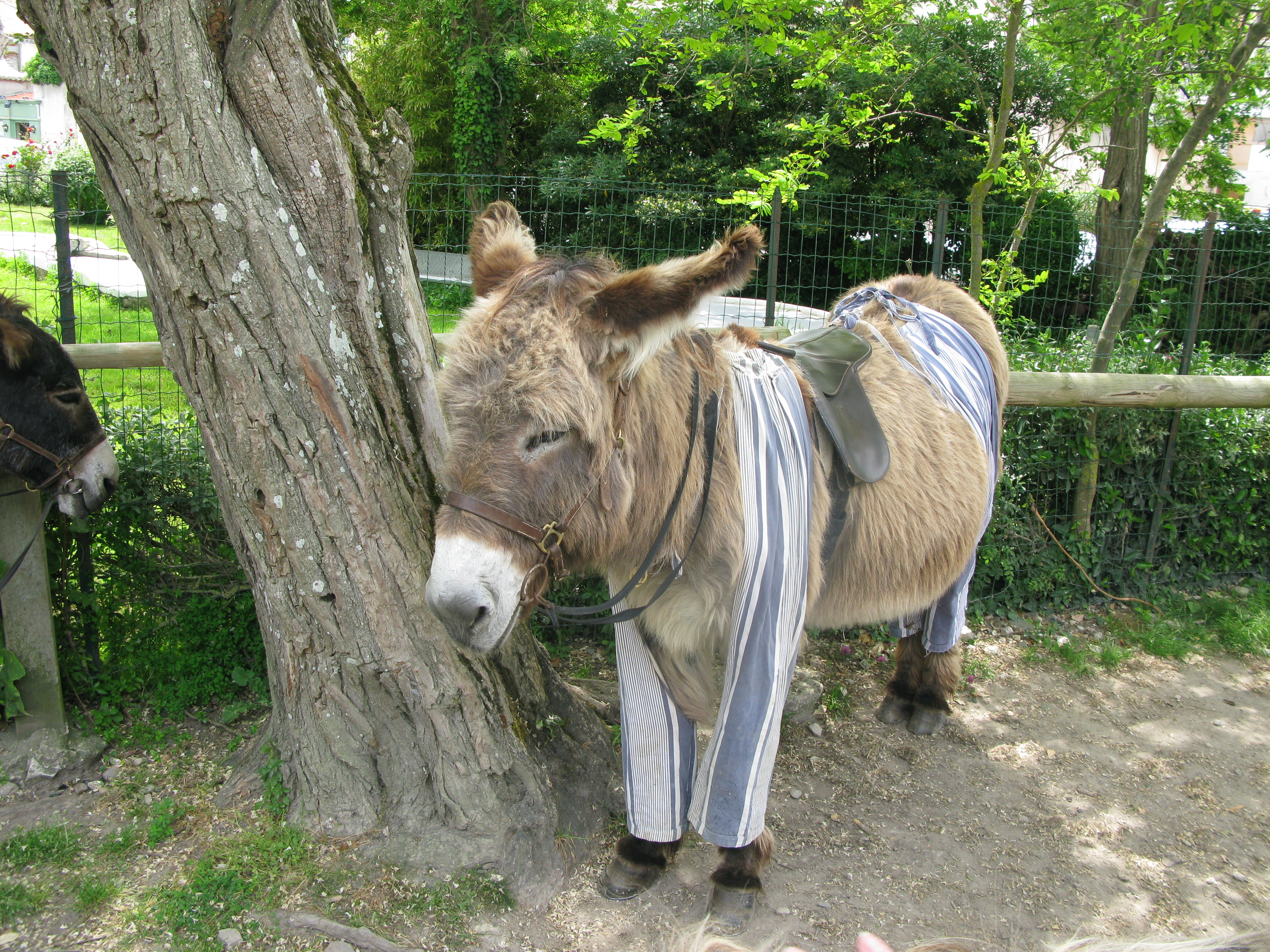
Âne en culotte donkey

== Personalities ==
- Nicolas Baudin, sailor and explorer
- Peter Stephen Du Ponceau, linguist and one of the oldest born individuals to be photographed (b. 1760).

== Twin towns ==
- Esperance, Western Australia, Australia

== See also ==
- Ernest Cognac Museum
- Communes of the Charente-Maritime department
