= Jean Caylar d'Anduze de Saint-Bonnet =

French noble and military general (1585–1636)

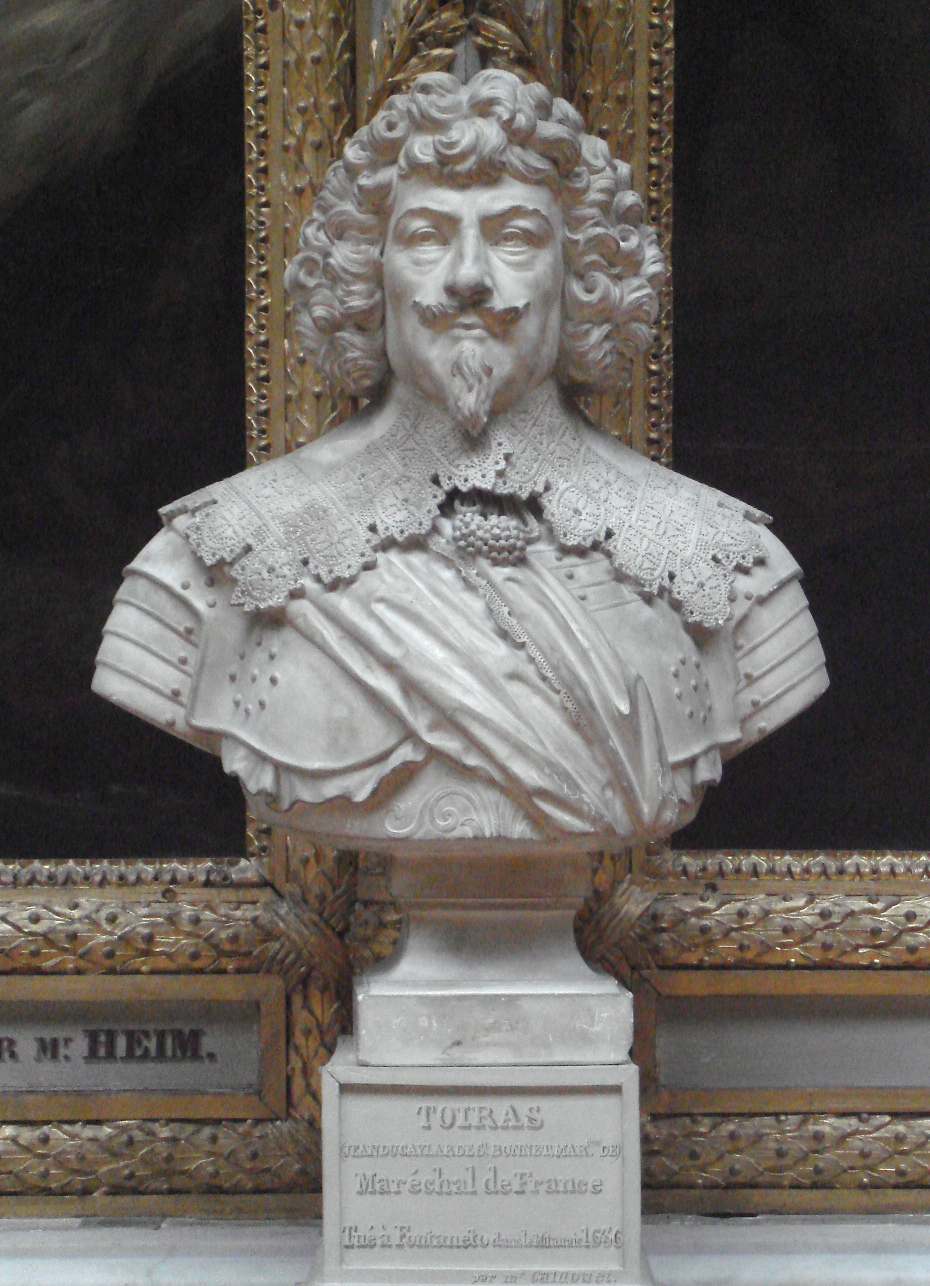
Bust of Toiras at Galerie des Batailles, Palace of Versailles.

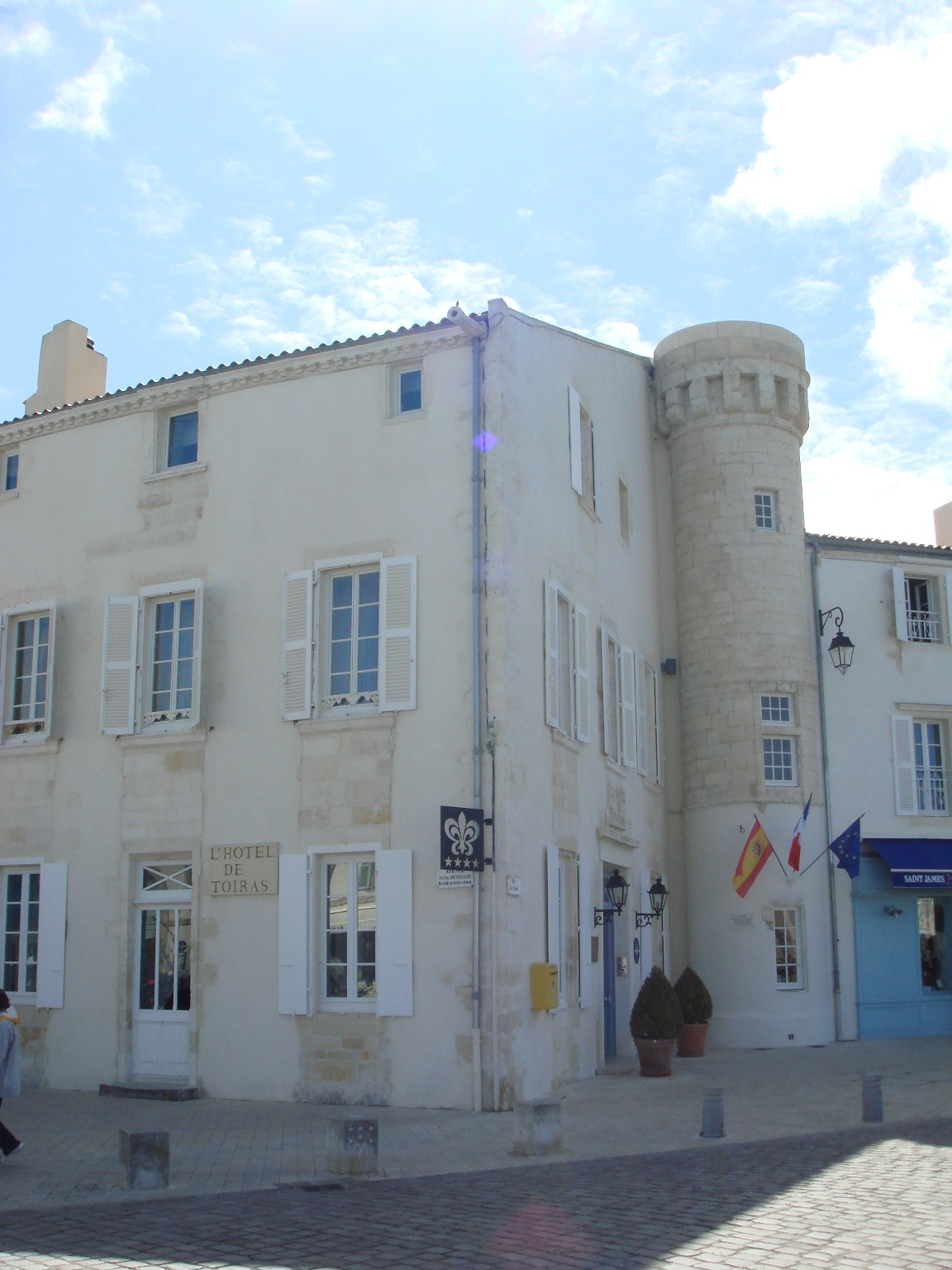
Hotel de Toiras in Saint-Martin-de-Ré.

Jean Caylar d'Anduze de Saint-Bonnet, Marquis de Toiras (1585–1636), often just called Toiras, was a Marshal of France of the 17th century.

Toiras fought against Soubise in the Capture of Ré island in 1625. After his victory, he received the title of count, and became Governor of Île de Ré.

Toiras famously sustained the 3-month Siege of Saint-Martin-de-Ré in Île de Ré by the Duke of Buckingham in 1627. After three months of combat, Toiras managed to repel the Duke of Buckingham, who was forced to withdraw in defeat.

He received the highest military distinction of Marshal of France in 1630.

Toiras died from a shotgun wound while attacking the fortress of Fontaneto d'Agogna near Milan in 1636, during the Thirty Years' War.

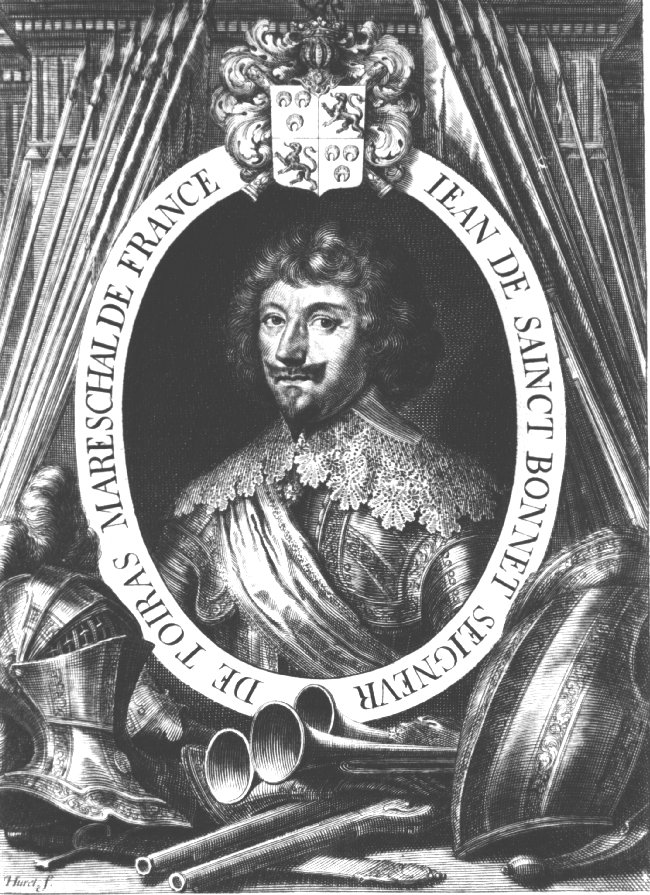
Portrait of Toiras.
