= Augustin de Beaulieu =

French general

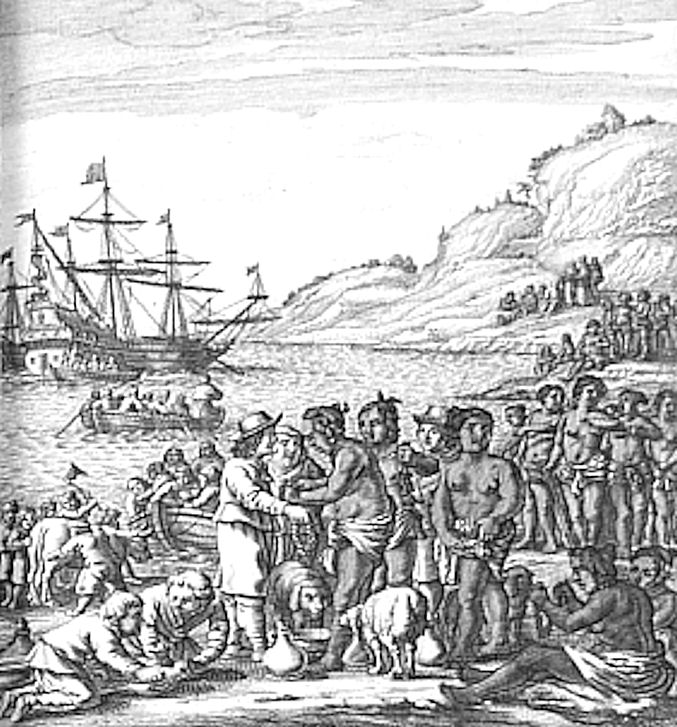
Fleet of Montmorency, led by Augustin de Beaulieu, in the East Indies, 1619–1622

Augustin de Beaulieu (French pronunciation: [oɡystɛ̃ də boljø]; 1589–1637) was a French general, who in 1619 led an armed expedition to the East Indies composed of three ships (275 crews, 106 cannons) and called the "Fleet of Montmorency", after its sponsor the Admiral Montmorency.

== Biography ==
Born at Rouen, Augustin de Beaulieu studied science and navigation. He participated in other expeditions before the 1619 one, and, in 1612 he sailed to Gambia. In 1616 he joined an expedition to the East as captain of a small ship in the fleet led by Captain De Nets.

de Beaulieu again sailed in 1619. The fleet was sent from Honfleur, to fight the Dutch in the Far East, and to establish trade with the sponsorship of traders from Rouen and Paris. Beaulieu made a noted description of Cape Town during the year that England occupied it. The fleet visited Aceh, which allowed Beaulieu to write one of the best accounts of Aceh in the early 17th century. Beaulieu met with Sultan Iskander Muda (1607–36) to obtain a trading license and the agreement to establish a factory.

They encountered the Dutch fleet off Sumatra. One ship was captured, another remained in Asia for inter-country trade, and the third returned to Le Havre in 1622. In 1624, with the Treaty of Compiègne, Richelieu obtained an agreement with the Dutch to cease fighting in the East.

de Beaulieu advocated for a French settlement on Madagascar, but Richelieu refrained from the adventure for fear of annoying the Dutch. It was only in 1665, with the establishment of the Compagnie des Indes Orientales, that a proper attempt would be made to settle the island. Beaulieu wrote in 1631-32:

I find the island [Madagascar] proper, once we are established there, for adventures to any place in the East Indies... for from the said place at the due season Persia can be reached... where a very useful and important trade can be established... And when the said trade with Persia is inconvenient, that with the countries of the Great Moghul, Ceylon, Masulipatam, Bengal, Pegu, Kedda, Achin, Tiku and Bantam can easily be followed.

— Augustin de Beaulieu, 1631-32.

de Beaulieu participated to the Siege of La Rochelle with the Royal fleet in 1627–28, as well as in the capture of Sainte-Marguerite island.

He died of influenza in Toulon in 1637.

== See also ==
- 1620 Robben Island earthquake
- France-Asia relations

== Works ==
- A. Beaulieu: De rampspoedige scheepvaart der Franschen naar Oostindien, Éd. Jan Tiewertsz and Pieter Arentsz, Amsterdam, 1669, 4to., 8 gravures. 170 p.
- Mémoires d'un voyage aux Indes orientales, 1619-1622, École française d'Extrême-Orient, [Paris] / Maisonneuve & Larose, Paris, 1996 (Pérégrinations asiatiques)
