= Tiku =

Tiku may refer to:

- Tiku, Iran
- Pulau Tikus, Malaysia
- Tiku Talsania, (born 1954), Indian actor
