= Louis XIII Crowned by Victory =

Painting by Philippe de Champaigne

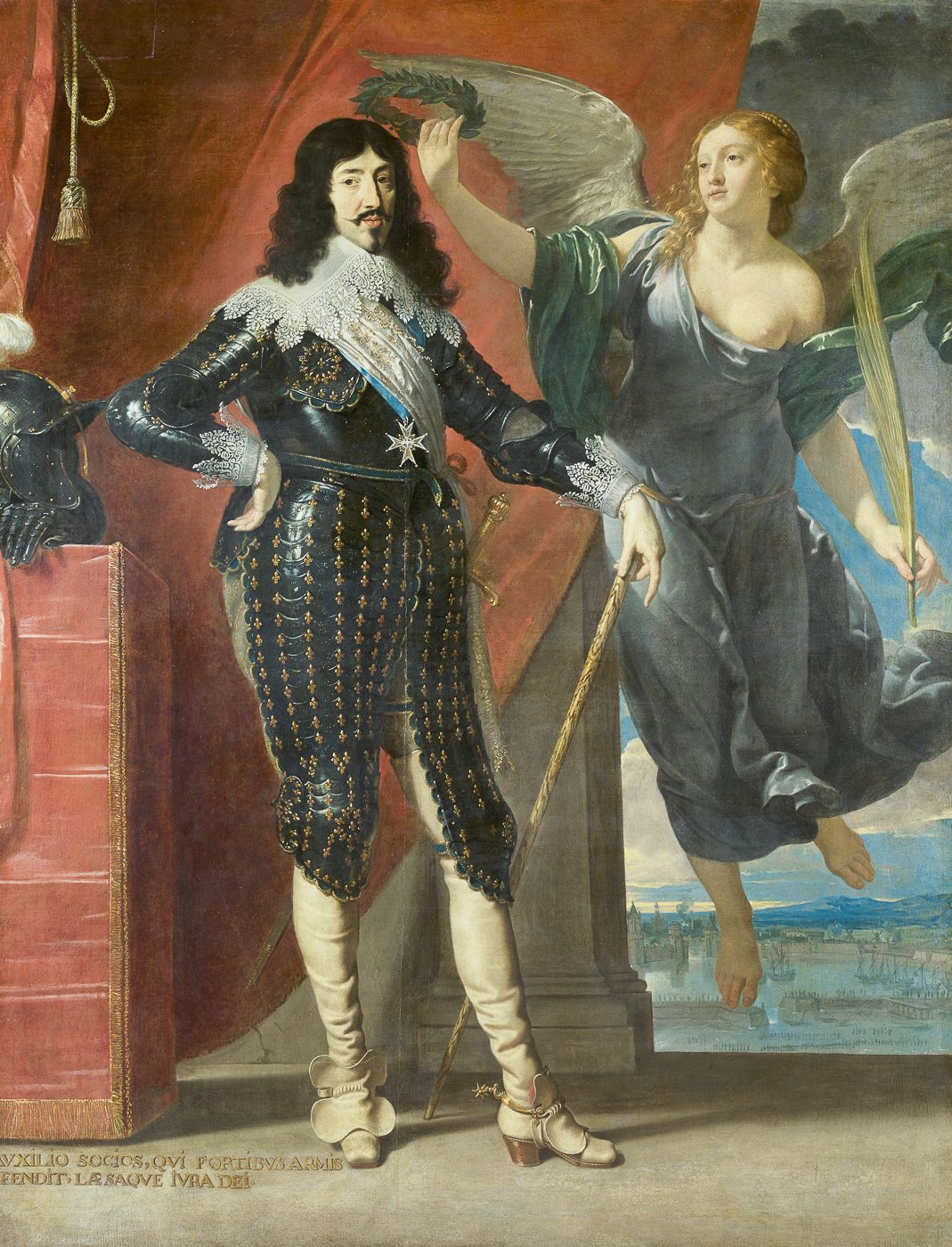
Louis XIII Crowned by Victory (1635) by Philippe de Champaigne

Louis XIII Crowned by Victory is a 1635 oil on canvas painting by Philippe de Champaigne. Probably commissioned by Cardinal Richelieu, it shows Louis XIII, King of France, crowned by a personification of Victory to mark his forces' victory in the Siege of La Rochelle. Since 1796 it has been in the Louvre, in Paris.
