= Louis XIII =

King of France from 1610 to 1643

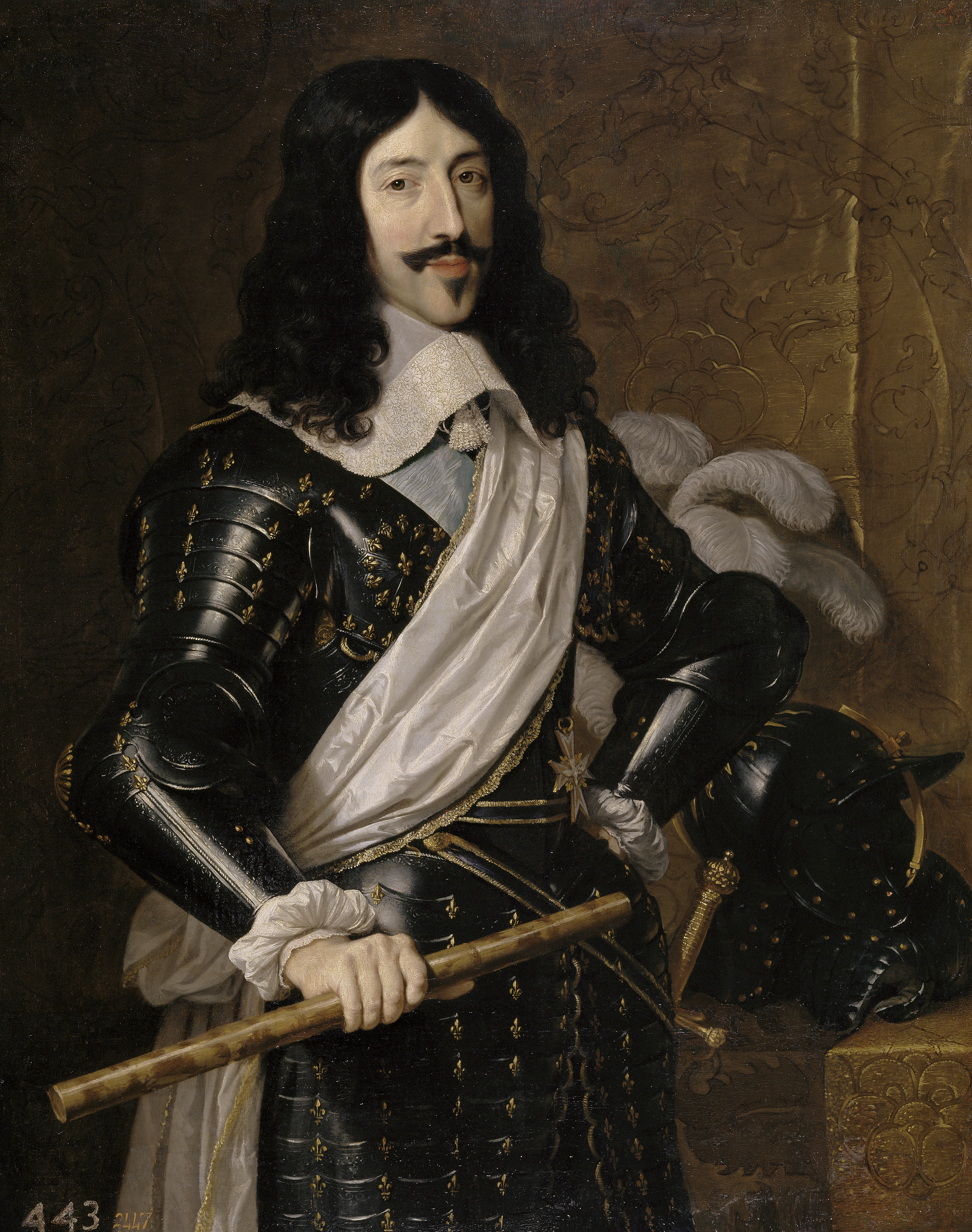
- Portrait by Philippe de Champaigne, c. 1635

King of France
- Reign: 14 May 1610 – 14 May 1643
- Coronation: 17 October 1610; Reims Cathedral
- Predecessor: Henry IV
- Successor: Louis XIV
- Regent: Marie de' Medici (1610–1617)
- Chief ministers: See list: Duke of Luynes (1617–1621); Cardinal Richelieu (1624–1642); Cardinal Mazarin (1642–1643)

King of Navarre
- Reign: 14 May 1610 – 20 October 1620
- Predecessor: Henry III
- Born: 27 September 1601; Château de Fontainebleau, Kingdom of France
- Died: 14 May 1643 (aged 41); Saint-Germain-en-Laye, Kingdom of France
- Burial: 19 May 1643; Basilica of St Denis, France
- Spouse: Anne of Austria (m. 1615)
- Issue: Louis XIV; Philippe I, Duke of Orléans
- House: Bourbon
- Father: Henry IV of France
- Mother: Marie de' Medici
- Religion: Roman Catholicism

Louis XIII (French pronunciation: [lwi tʁɛz]; sometimes called the Just; 27 September 1601 – 14 May 1643) was King of France from 1610 until his death in 1643 and King of Navarre (as Louis II) from 1610 to 1620, when the crown of Navarre was merged with the French crown.

Shortly before his ninth birthday, Louis became king of France and Navarre after his father Henry IV was assassinated. His mother, Marie de' Medici, acted as regent during his minority. Mismanagement of the kingdom and ceaseless political intrigues by Marie and her Italian favourites led the young king to take power in 1617 by exiling his mother and executing her followers, including Concino Concini, the most influential Italian at the French court.

Louis XIII, taciturn and suspicious, relied heavily on his chief ministers, first Charles d'Albert, duc de Luynes and then Cardinal Richelieu, to govern the Kingdom of France. The King and the Cardinal are remembered for establishing the Académie française, and ending the revolt of the French nobility. They systematically destroyed the castles of defiant lords, and denounced the use of private violence (dueling, carrying weapons, and maintaining private armies). By the end of the 1620s, Richelieu had established "the royal monopoly of force" as the ruling doctrine. The king's reign was also marked by the struggles against the Huguenots and Habsburg Spain.

== Early life, 1601–1610 ==
Born at the Palace of Fontainebleau, Louis XIII was the eldest child of King Henry IV of France and his second wife Marie de' Medici. As son of the king, he was a Fils de France ("son of France"), and as the eldest son, Dauphin of France. His father Henry IV was the first French king of the House of Bourbon, having succeeded his second cousin, Henry III (1574–1589), in application of Salic law. Louis XIII's paternal grandparents were Antoine de Bourbon, duc de Vendôme, and Jeanne d'Albret, Queen of Navarre. His maternal grandparents were Francesco I de' Medici, Grand Duke of Tuscany, and Joanna of Austria, Grand Duchess of Tuscany. Eleonora de' Medici, his maternal aunt, was his godmother.

As a child, he was raised under the supervision of the royal governess Françoise de Montglat and his physician, Jean Héroard.

The ambassador of King James I of England to the court of France, Sir Edward Herbert, who presented his credentials to Louis XIII in 1619, remarked on Louis's extreme congenital speech impediment and his double teeth:

...I presented to the King [Louis] a letter of credence from the King [James] my master: the King [Louis] assured me of a reciprocal affection to the King [James] my master, and of my particular welcome to his Court: his words were never many, as being so extream [sic] a stutterer that he would sometimes hold his tongue out of his mouth a good while before he could speak so much as one word; he had besides a double row of teeth, and was observed seldom or never to spit or blow his nose, or to sweat much, 'tho he were very laborious, and almost indefatigable in his exercises of hunting and hawking, to which he was much addicted...

== Regency of Marie de' Medici, 1610–1617 ==
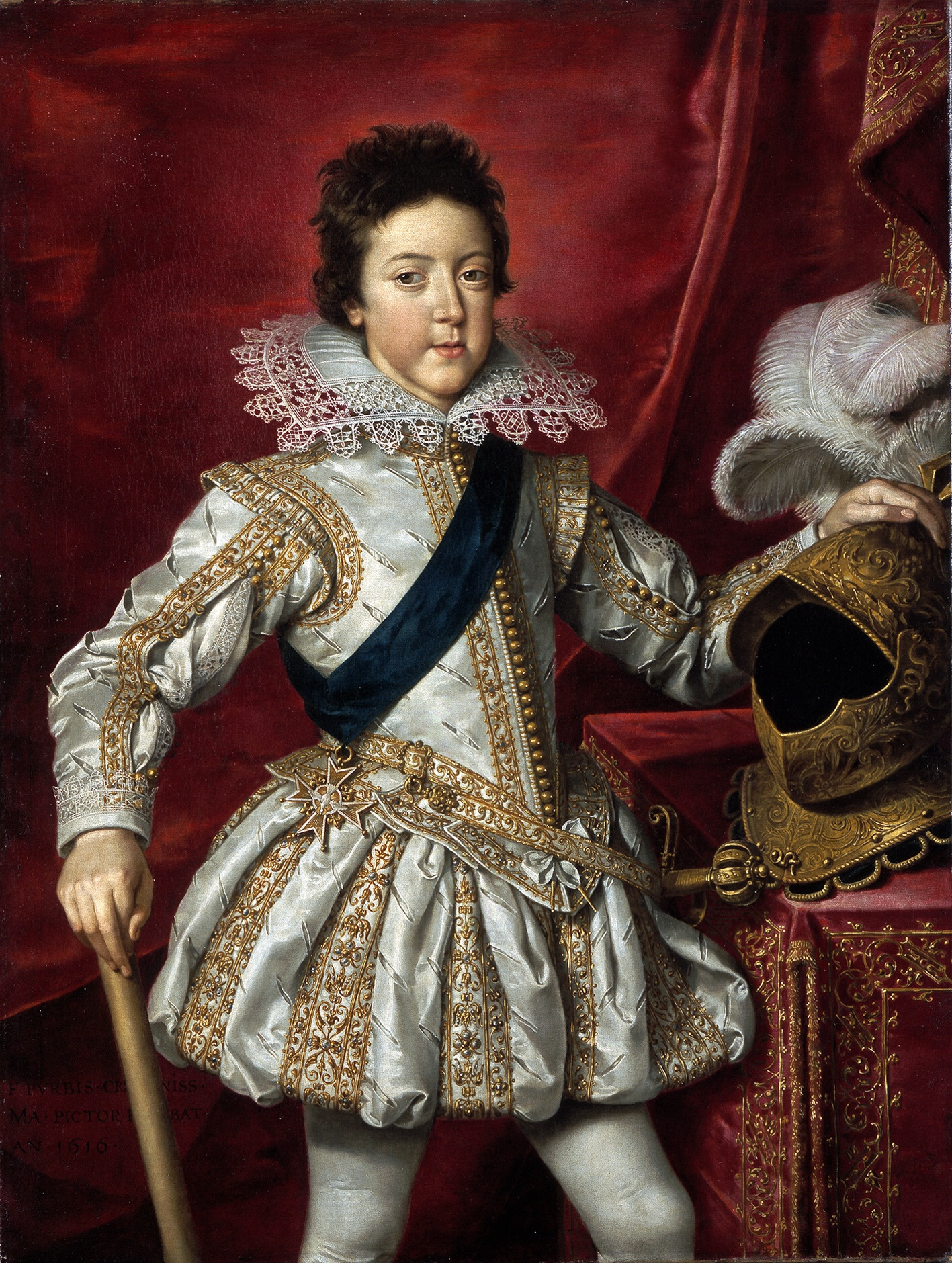
Portrait of Louis XIII by Frans Pourbus the Younger, c. 1616

Louis XIII ascended the throne in 1610 upon the assassination of his father, and his mother Marie de' Medici acted as his Regent. Although Louis XIII came of age at thirteen (1614), his mother did not give up her position as Regent until 1617, when he was 16. Marie maintained most of her husband's ministers, with the exception of Maximilien de Béthune, Duke of Sully, who was unpopular in the country. She mainly relied on Nicolas de Neufville, seigneur de Villeroy, Noël Brûlart de Sillery, and Pierre Jeannin for political advice. Marie pursued a moderate policy, confirming the Edict of Nantes. She was not, however, able to prevent rebellion by nobles such as Henri, Prince of Condé (1588–1646), second in line to the throne after Marie's second surviving son Gaston, Duke of Orléans. Condé squabbled with Marie in 1614, and briefly raised an army, but he found little support in the country, and Marie was able to raise her own army. Nevertheless, Marie agreed to call an Estates General assembly to address Condé's grievances.

The assembly of this Estates General was delayed until Louis XIII formally came of age on his thirteenth birthday. Although his coming-of-age formally ended Marie's Regency, she remained the de facto ruler of France. The Estates General accomplished little, spending its time discussing the relationship of France to the Papacy and the venality of offices, but reaching no resolutions.

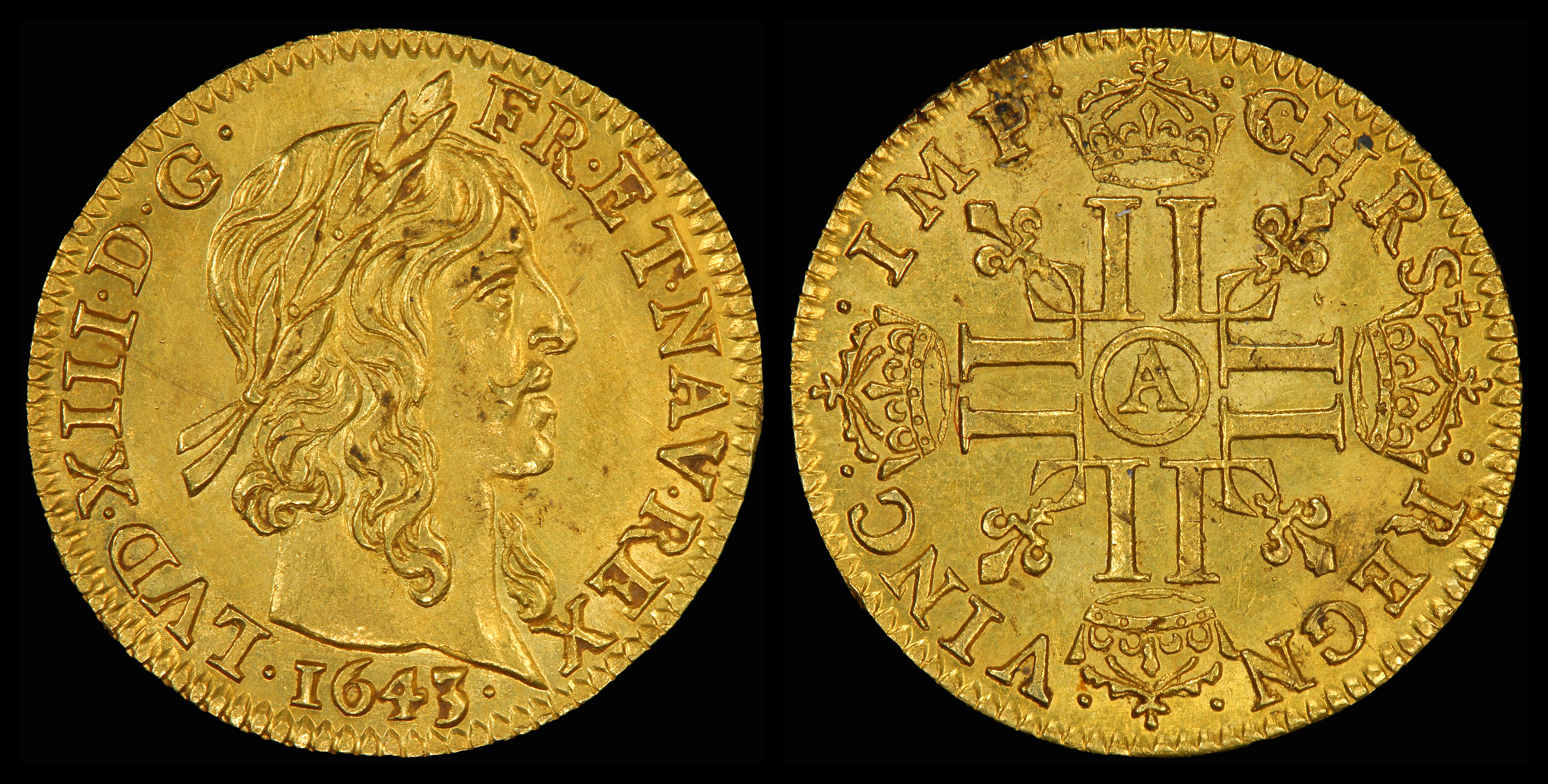
Half Louis d'Or (1643) depicting Louis XIII

Beginning in 1615, Marie came to rely increasingly on Concino Concini, an Italian who assumed the role of her favourite, and was widely unpopular because he was a foreigner. This further antagonised Condé, who launched another rebellion in the early months of 1616. Huguenot leaders supported Condé's rebellion, which led the young Louis XIII to conclude that they would never be loyal subjects. Eventually, Condé and Queen Marie made peace with the ratification on 3 May of the Treaty of Loudun, which allowed Condé great power in government but did not remove Concini. However, on 1 September, after growing dissatisfaction from nobles due to Concini's position, Queen Marie, with Louis's help, imprisoned Condé to protect Concini, leading to renewed revolts against the Queen and Concini.

In the meantime, Louis XIII decided, with the encouragement of Charles d'Albert (the Grand Falconer of France) and other advisers, to break with his mother and to arrest Concini. On 24 April 1617, during the attempted arrest, Concini was killed. His widow Leonora Dori Galigaï was tried for witchcraft, condemned, beheaded, and burned on 8 July 1617, and Marie was sent into exile in Blois. Later, Louis conferred the title of Duke of Luynes on Charles d'Albert.

== Ascendancy of Charles de Luynes, 1617–1621 ==
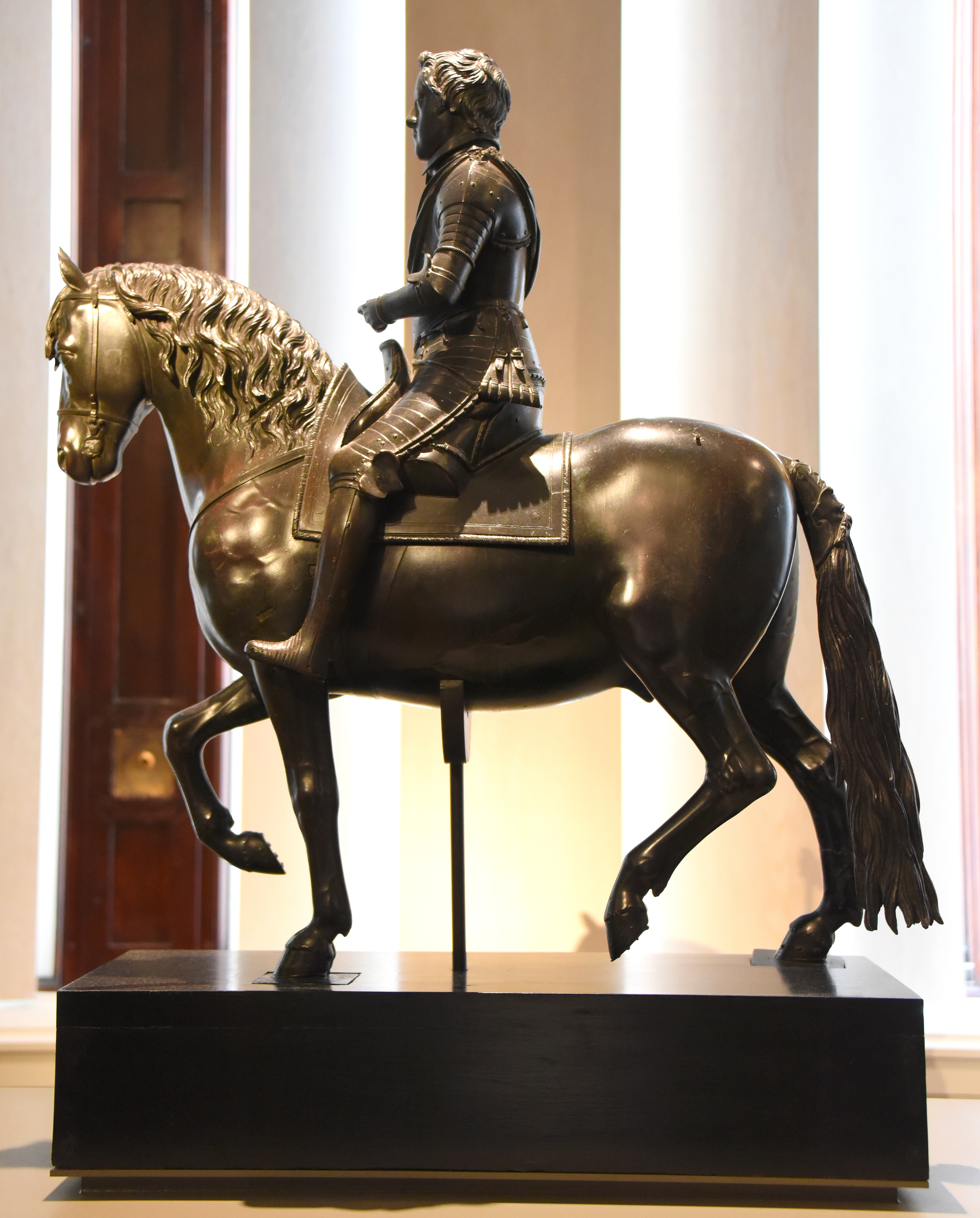
Louis XIII on horseback, c. 1615–1620. Bronze, from France (probably Paris). Victoria and Albert Museum, London

Luynes soon became as unpopular as Concini had been. Other nobles resented his monopolisation of the King. Luynes was seen as less competent than Henry IV's ministers, many now elderly or deceased, who had surrounded Marie de' Medici.

The Thirty Years' War broke out in 1618. The French court was initially unsure of which side to support. On the one hand, France's traditional rivalry with the House of Habsburg argued in favour of intervening on behalf of the Protestant powers (and Louis's father Henry IV of France had once been a Huguenot leader). On the other hand, Louis XIII had a strict Catholic upbringing, and his natural inclination was to support the Holy Roman Emperor, the Habsburg Ferdinand II.

The French nobles were further antagonised against Luynes by the 1618 revocation of the paulette tax and by the sale of offices in 1620. From her exile in Blois, Marie de' Medici became the obvious rallying point for this discontent, and the Bishop of Luçon (who became Cardinal Richelieu in 1622) was allowed to act as her chief adviser, serving as a go-between Marie and the King.

French nobles launched a rebellion on 2 July 1620, but their forces were easily routed by royal forces at the Battle of Ponts-de-Cé on 7 August 1620. Louis then launched an expedition against the Huguenots of Béarn who had defied a number of royal decisions. This expedition managed to re-establish Catholicism as the official religion of Béarn. However, the Béarn expedition drove Huguenots in other provinces into a rebellion led by Henri, Duke of Rohan.

In 1621 Louis XIII was formally reconciled with his mother. Luynes was appointed Constable of France, after which he and Louis set out to quell the Huguenot rebellion. The siege at the Huguenot stronghold of Montauban had to be abandoned after three months owing to the large number of royal troops who had succumbed to camp fever. One of the victims of camp fever was Luynes, who died in December 1621.

== Rule by council, 1622–1624 ==
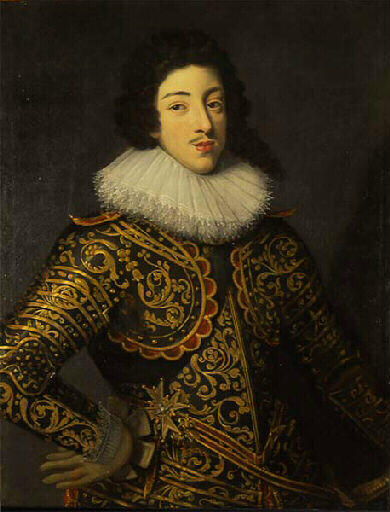
Louis XIII, by Frans Pourbus the younger (1620)

Following the death of Luynes, Louis determined that he would rule by council. His mother returned from exile and, in 1622, entered this council, where Condé recommended violent suppression of the Huguenots. The 1622 campaign, however, followed the pattern of the previous year: royal forces won some early victories, but were unable to complete a siege, this time at the fortress of Montpellier.

The rebellion was ended by the Treaty of Montpellier, signed by Louis XIII and the Duke of Rohan in October 1622. The treaty confirmed the tenets of the Edict of Nantes: several Huguenot fortresses were to be razed, but the Huguenots retained control of Montauban and La Rochelle. In 1622, Louis established the Musketeers of the King's Guard.

Louis ultimately dismissed Noël Brûlart de Sillery and Pierre Brûlart in 1624 because of his displeasure with how they handled the diplomatic situation over the Valtellina with Spain. Valtellina was an area with Catholic inhabitants under the suzerainty of the Protestant Three Leagues. It served as an important route to Italy for France and it provided an easy connection between the Spanish and the Holy Roman empires, especially in helping each other with armies if necessary. Spain was constantly interfering in the Valtellina, which angered Louis, as he wanted to hold possession of this strategically important passageway. (Note: In these years the French kingdom was literally surrounded by the Habsburg realms, for the Habsburgs were Kings of Spain as well as Holy Roman Emperors. In addition, the Spanish and Holy Roman empires included the territories of today's Belgium, The Netherlands, Luxembourg, Germany, and northern Italy.) He therefore found a better servitor in his Superintendent of Finances Charles de La Vieuville, who held similar views of Spain as the king, and who advised Louis to side with the Dutch via the Treaty of Compiègne. However, La Vieuville was dismissed by the middle of 1624, partly due to his bad behaviour (during his tenure as superintendent he was arrogant and incompetent) and because of a well-organized pamphlet campaign by Cardinal Richelieu against his council rival. Louis needed a new chief advisor; Cardinal Richelieu would be that counsellor.

== Ministry of Cardinal Richelieu, 1624–1642 ==
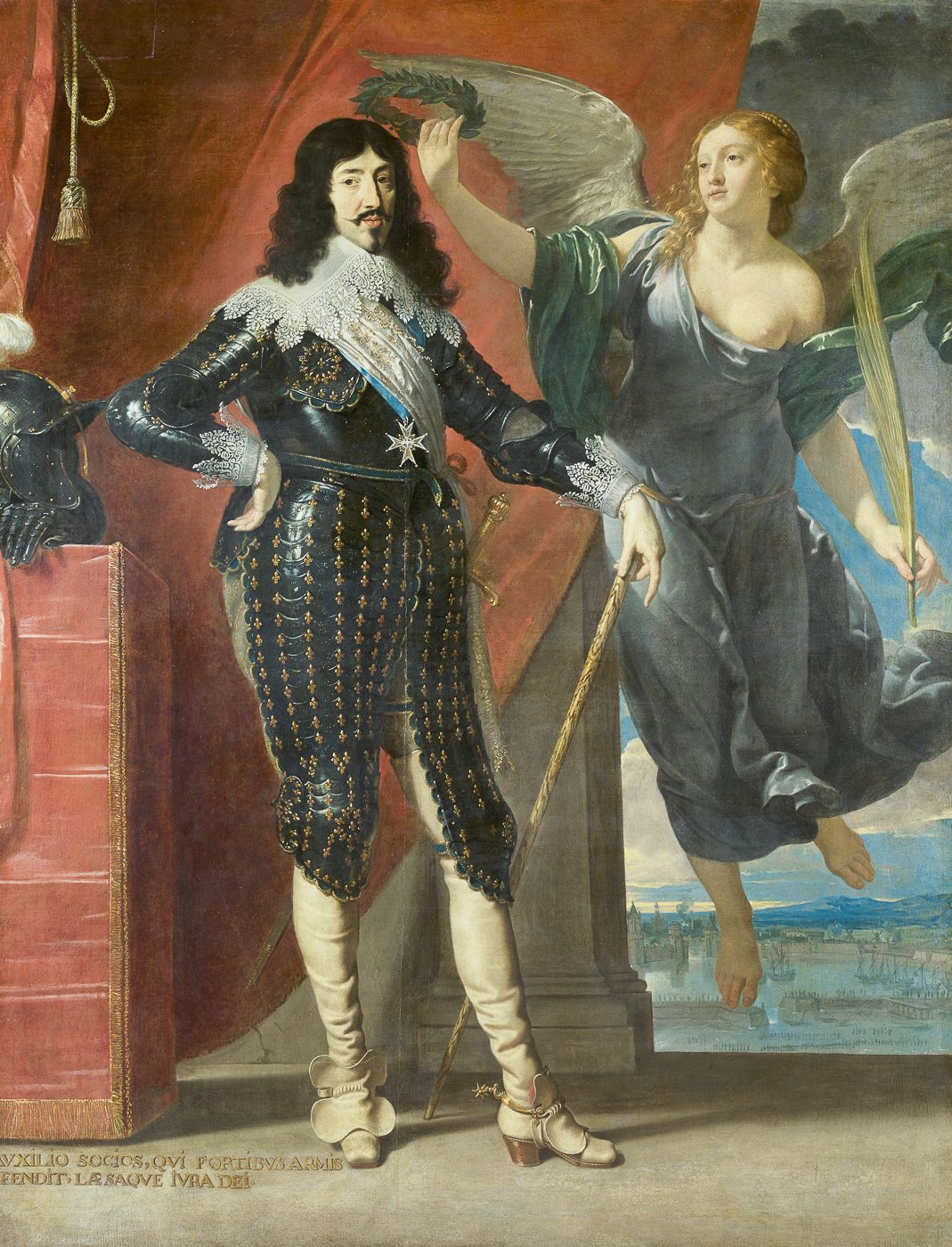
Louis XIII Crowned by Victory (Siege of La Rochelle, 1628), Philippe de Champaigne, musée du Louvre

Cardinal Richelieu played a major role in Louis XIII's reign from 1624, determining France's direction over the course of the next eighteen years. As a result of Richelieu's work, Louis XIII became one of the first examples of an absolute monarch. Under Louis and Richelieu, the crown successfully intervened in the Thirty Years' War against the Habsburgs, managed to keep the French nobility in line, and retracted the political and military privileges granted to the Huguenots by Henry IV (while maintaining their religious freedoms). Louis XIII successfully led the important Siege of La Rochelle. In addition, Louis had the port of Le Havre modernised, and he built a powerful navy.

Louis also worked to reverse the trend of promising French artists leaving for Italy to work and study. He commissioned the painters Nicolas Poussin and Philippe de Champaigne to decorate the Louvre Palace. In foreign matters, Louis organised the development and administration of New France, expanding its settlements westward along the Saint Lawrence River from Quebec City to Montreal.

== Expansion overseas under Louis XIII ==
=== Morocco ===
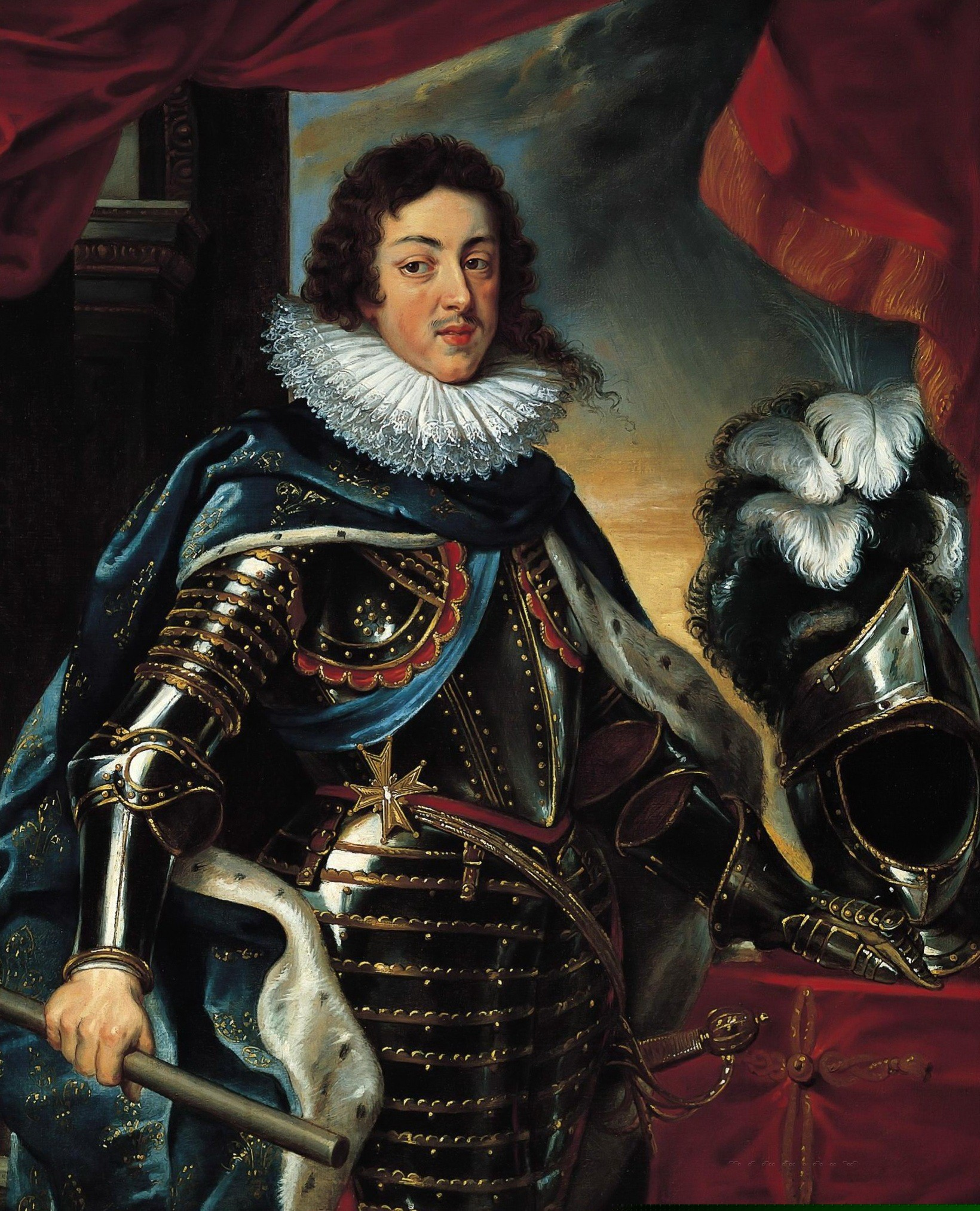
Louis XIII, by Peter Paul Rubens

In order to continue the exploration efforts of his predecessor Henry IV, Louis XIII considered a colonial venture in Morocco, and sent a fleet under Isaac de Razilly in 1619. Razilly was able to explore the coast as far as Mogador. In 1624 he was given charge of an embassy to the pirate harbour of Salé in Morocco, in order to solve the affair of the Zaydani Library of Mulay Zidan.

In 1630, Razilly was able to negotiate the purchase of French slaves from the Moroccans. He visited Morocco again in 1631, and helped negotiate the Franco-Moroccan Treaty (1631). The treaty gave France preferential treatment, known as capitulations: preferential tariffs, the establishment of a consulate, and freedom of religion for French subjects.

=== Americas ===
Unlike other colonial powers, France, under the guidance of Louis XIII and Cardinal Richelieu, encouraged a peaceful coexistence in New France between the natives and the colonists. Indians, converted to Catholicism, were considered as "natural Frenchmen" by the Ordonnance of 1627:

The descendants of the French who are accustomed to this country [New France], together with all the Indians who will be brought to the knowledge of the faith and will profess it, shall be deemed and renowned natural Frenchmen, and as such may come to live in France when they want, and acquire, donate, and succeed and accept donations and legacies, just as true French subjects, without being required to take letters of declaration of naturalization.

Acadia was also developed under Louis XIII. In 1632, Isaac de Razilly became involved, at the request of Cardinal Richelieu, in the colonization of Acadia, by taking possession of Port-Royal (now Annapolis Royal, Nova Scotia) and developing it into a French colony. The King gave Razilly the official title of lieutenant-general for New France. He took on military tasks such as taking control of Fort Pentagouet at Majabigwaduce on the Penobscot Bay, which had been given to France in an earlier Treaty, and to inform the English they were to vacate all lands north of Pemaquid. This resulted in all the French interests in Acadia being restored. In Brazil, the colony of Equinoctial France was established in 1612, but only lasted 4 years until it was eliminated by the Portuguese. In 1642, Louis XIII authorised French subjects to engage in the Atlantic slave trade provided those they enslaved were converted to Christianity.

=== Asia ===
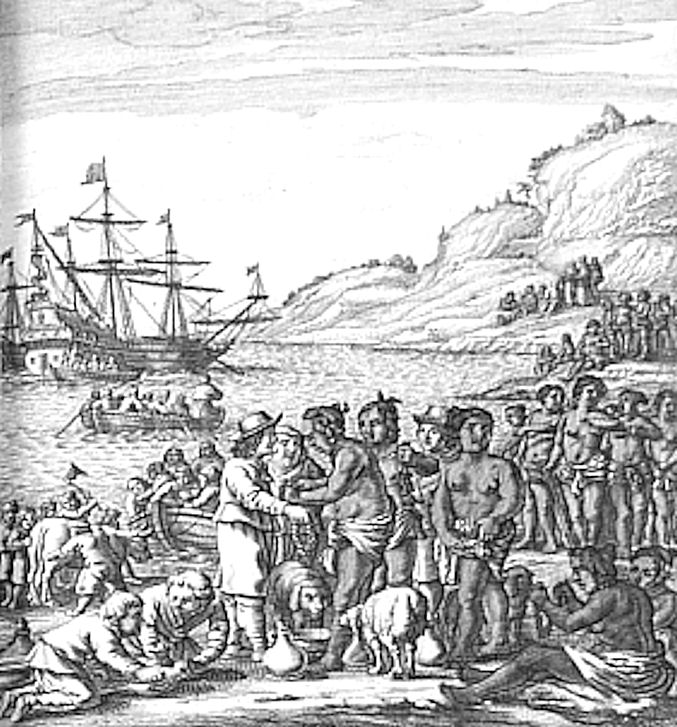
"Fleet of Montmorency", led by Augustin de Beaulieu, in the East Indies, 1619–22

France-Japan relations started under Louis XIII in 1615 when Hasekura Tsunenaga, a Japanese samurai and ambassador, sent to Rome by Date Masamune, landed at Saint-Tropez for a few days. In 1636, Guillaume Courtet, a French Dominican priest, reciprocated when he set foot in Japan.

Also in 1615, Marie de' Medici incorporated the merchants of Dieppe and other harbours to found the Company of the Moluccas. In 1619, an armed expedition composed of three ships (275 crew, 106 cannon) and called the "Fleet of Montmorency" under General Augustin de Beaulieu was sent from Honfleur, to fight the Dutch in the Far East. In 1624, with the Treaty of Compiègne, Cardinal Richelieu obtained an agreement to halt the Dutch–French warfare in the Far East.

== Antipathy with brother ==
Twice the king's younger brother, Gaston, Duke of Orléans, had to leave France for conspiring against his government and for attempting to undermine the influence of his mother and Cardinal Richelieu. After waging an unsuccessful war in Languedoc, he took refuge in Flanders. In 1643, on the death of Louis XIII, Gaston became lieutenant-general of the kingdom and fought against Spain on the northern frontiers of France.

== Marriage ==
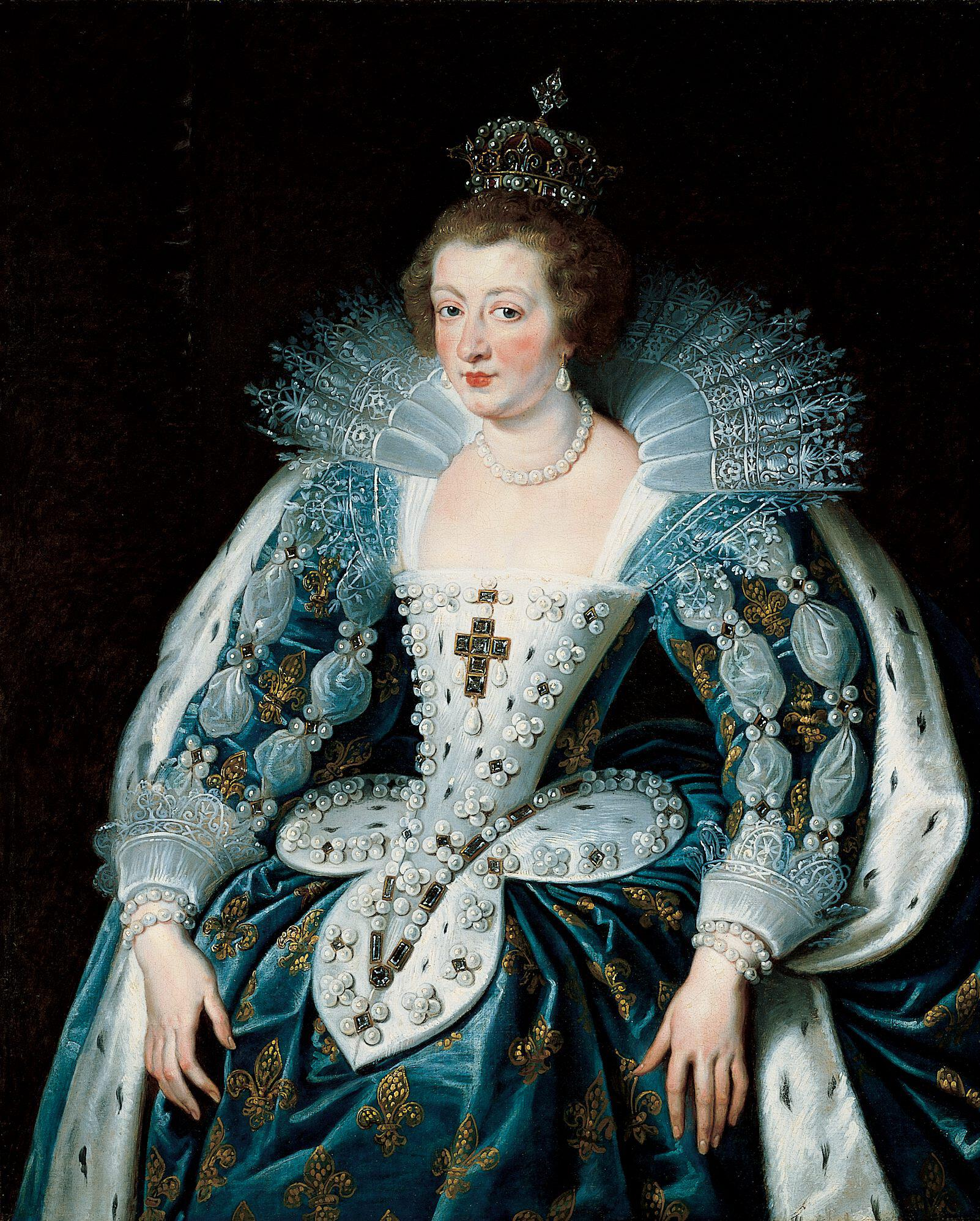
Anne of Austria, Queen of France, wife of Louis XIII (by Peter Paul Rubens, 1625)

On 24 November 1615, Louis XIII married Anne of Austria, daughter of Philip III of Spain. The couple were second cousins, by mutual descent from Ferdinand I, Holy Roman Emperor. This marriage followed a tradition of cementing military and political alliances between the Catholic powers of France and Spain with royal marriages. The tradition went back to the marriage of Louis VII of France and Constance of Castile. The marriage was only briefly happy, and the King's duties often kept them apart. After 23 years of marriage and four stillbirths, Anne finally gave birth to a son on 5 September 1638, the future Louis XIV.

Many people regarded this birth as a miracle and, in show of gratitude to God for the long-awaited birth of an heir, his parents named him Louis-Dieudonné ("God-given"). As another sign of gratitude, according to several interpretations, seven months before his birth, France was dedicated by Louis XIII to the Virgin Mary, who, many believed, had interceded for the perceived miracle. But the text of the dedication does not mention the royal pregnancy and birth as one of its reasons, and Louis XIII himself is said to have expressed his scepticism with regard to the miracle after his son's birth. In gratitude for having successfully given birth, the queen founded the Benedictine abbey of the Val-de-Grâce, for which Louis XIV laid the cornerstone of its church, an early masterpiece of French Baroque architecture.

== Issue ==
The couple had the following offspring:

Name	Portrait	Lifespan	Notes
stillborn child		Dec 1619	
stillborn child		14 Mar 1622	
stillborn child		1626	
stillborn child		Apr 1631	
Louis-Dieudonné, Dauphin of France (later Louis XIV)		5 Sep 1638 – 1 Sep 1715	Married Maria Theresa of Spain (Spanish: María Teresa de Austria; French: Marie-Thérèse d'Autriche) (1638–83) in 1660. Had issue, after Maria Theresa's death, he secretly married his last maîtresse-en-titre (official mistress), Madame de Maintenon but had no issue.
Philippe of France, Duke of Anjou (later Duke of Orléans)		21 Sep 1640 – 8 Jun 1701	Married (1) Princess Henrietta of England (1644–70) in 1661. Had issue. Married (2) Elizabeth Charlotte, Madame Palatine (1652–1722) in 1671. Had issue.

Voltaire claimed in the second edition of Questions sur l'Encyclopédie (1771) that before Louis XIV was born, Louis XIII had an illegitimate son, who was jailed and his face hidden beneath an iron mask (see the Man in the Iron Mask).

== Sexuality ==
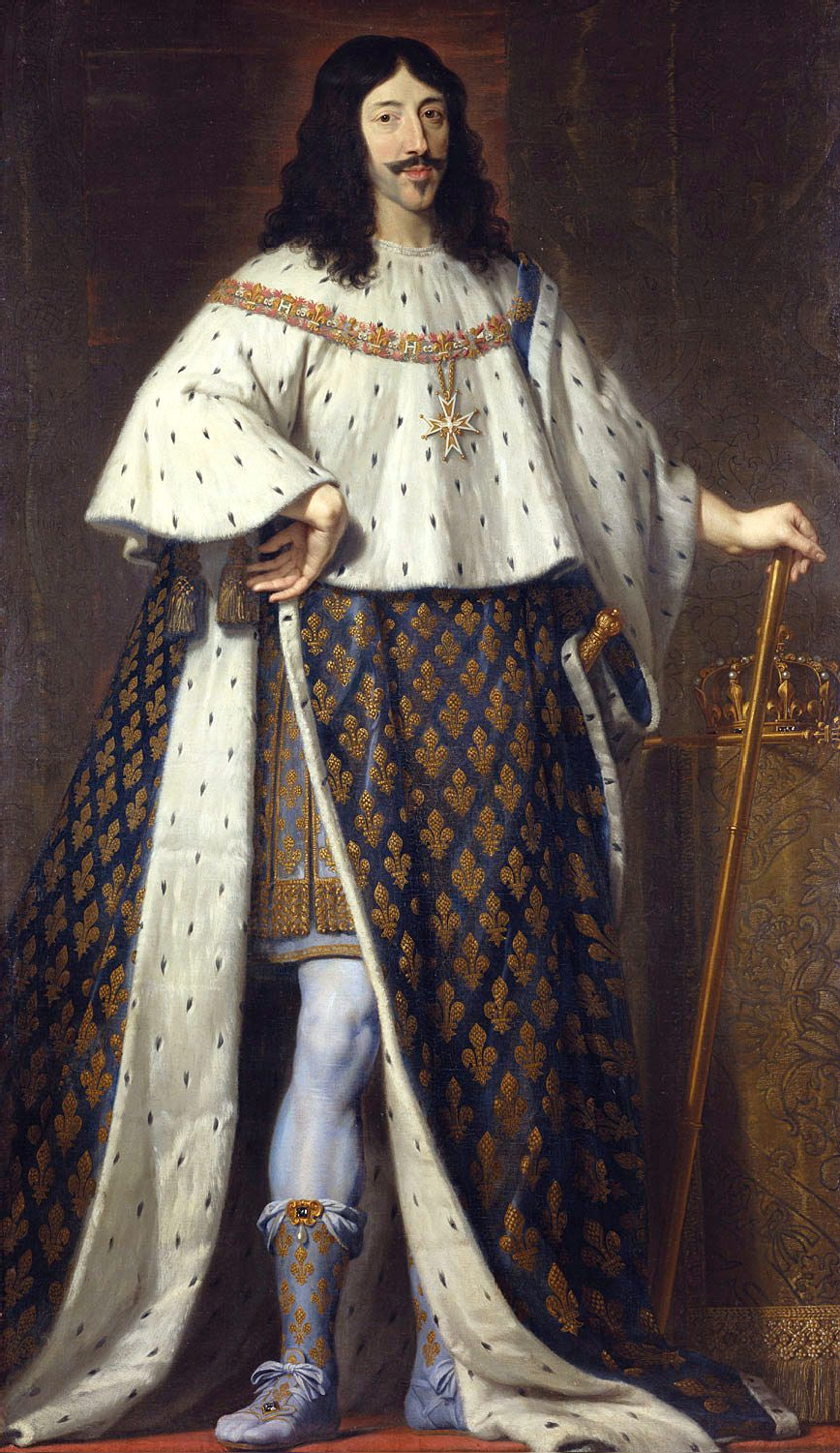
Coronation portrait of Louis XIII by Philippe de Champaigne

There is no evidence that Louis kept mistresses (a distinction that earned him the title "Louis the Chaste"), but several reports suggest that he may have been homosexual. The prolonged temporal gap between the queen's pregnancies may have been a result of Louis XIII's aversion to heterosexual activity, a matter of great political consequence, since it took the couple more than 20 years of marriage before Louis XIV's birth. His interests as a teenager were focused on male courtiers and he developed an intense emotional attachment to his favourite, Charles d'Albert, although some say there is no clear evidence of a sexual relationship. Gédéon Tallemant des Réaux, drawing from rumours told to him by a critic of the King (the Marquise de Rambouillet), explicitly speculated in his Historiettes about what happened in the king's bed.

A further liaison with an equerry, François de Baradas, ended when the latter lost favour fighting a duel after duelling had been forbidden by royal decree.

Louis was also captivated by Henri Coiffier de Ruzé, Marquis of Cinq-Mars, 19 years his junior, who was later executed for conspiring with the Spanish enemy in time of war. Tallemant described how on a royal journey, the King "sent M. le Grand [de Cinq-Mars] to undress, who returned, adorned like a bride. 'To bed, to bed' he said to him impatiently... and the mignon was not in before the king was already kissing his hands. But he did not find that M. le Grand, whose heart was elsewhere, responded to his great ardour."

== Death ==
Louis XIII was unwell during the winter of 1642–1643. He managed a few hunting trips to Versailles, but by the middle of February was mostly bedridden. From contemporary descriptions, modern historians have surmised that he suffered from extrapulmonary tuberculosis. On 13 April his chief physician informed him that his illness would be fatal. He died in Paris on 14 May 1643, the 33rd anniversary of his father's death. According to his biographer A. Lloyd Moote,

"his intestines were inflamed and ulcerated, making digestion virtually impossible; tuberculosis had spread to his lungs, accompanied by habitual cough. Either of these major ailments, or the accumulation of minor problems, may have killed him, not to mention physiological weaknesses that made him prone to disease or his doctors' remedies of enemas and bleedings, which continued right to his death."

== Composer and lute player ==
Louis XIII shared his mother's love of the lute, developed in her childhood in Florence. One of his first toys was a lute and his personal doctor, Jean Héroard, reports him playing it for his mother in 1604, at the age of three. In 1635, Louis XIII composed the music, wrote the libretto and designed the costumes for the "Ballet de la Merlaison". The king himself danced in two performances of the ballet the same year at Chantilly and Royaumont.

== Influence on men's fashion ==
In the sphere of men's fashion, Louis helped introduce the wearing of wigs among men in 1624. This fashion spread in Europe and European-influenced countries in the 1660s and was a dominant style among men for about 140 years, until the change of dress in the 1790s which was affected by the French Revolution (1789–1799).

== In fiction and film ==
- Louis XIII, his wife Anne, and Cardinal Richelieu became central figures in Alexandre Dumas, père's 1844 novel The Three Musketeers and subsequent television and film adaptations. The book depicts Louis as a man willing to have Richelieu as a powerful advisor but aware of his scheming; he is portrayed as bored and sour, dwarfed by Richelieu's intellect. Films such as the 1948, the 1973 or the 2011 versions tend to treat Louis XIII as a comic character, depicting him as bumbling and incompetent. In the 1993 film, he is depicted as willing to stand up to Richelieu when necessary but still strongly influenced by him. He is also depicted as in love with his wife, Anne, but very nervous and unsure around her.
- The 2014 BBC TV series, The Musketeers, merging the historical with the fictional, portrayed the King as both incompetent and strong, whose alliance with Spain is ever faltering. He is portrayed by Ryan Gage.
- Arthur Lubin portrayed him in the 1926 film Bardelys the Magnificent.
- Louis XIII, his wife Anne, his younger brother Gaston, Cardinal Richelieu, Cardinal Mazarin and members of the Royal family are mentioned throughout the course of the 1632 series of novels and other writings by Eric Flint et al., especially 1636: The Cardinal Virtues.
- Louis XIII appears in novels of Robert Merle's Fortune de France series (1977–2003).
- Louis XIII was portrayed by Edward Arnold in the 1935 film Cardinal Richelieu, with George Arliss portraying the Cardinal.
- Ken Russell directed the 1971 film The Devils, in which Louis XIII is a significant character, albeit one with no resemblance to the real man. Louis XIII is portrayed as an effeminate gay man who amuses himself by shooting Protestants dressed up as birds. The film was based on Aldous Huxley's 1952 book The Devils of Loudun.
- Louis XIII appears in the 2002 Doctor Who audio drama The Church and the Crown.

== Ancestors ==
Ancestors of Louis XIII

8. Charles, Duke of Vendôme
4. Antoine of Navarre
9. Françoise of Alençon
2. Henry IV of France
10. Henry II of Navarre
5. Jeanne III of Navarre
11. Marguerite of Angoulême
1. Louis XIII of France
12. Cosimo I de' Medici, Grand Duke of Tuscany
6. Francesco I de' Medici, Grand Duke of Tuscany
13. Eleanor of Toledo
3. Marie de' Medici
14. Ferdinand I, Holy Roman Emperor
7. Joanna of Austria
15. Anne of Bohemia and Hungary

== See also ==
- Absolute monarchy in France
- Charles de Lorme, personal medical doctor to Louis XIII
- French monarchs family tree

== Notes ==
=== Explanatory footnotes ===
Louis XIII of France & II of Navarre House of Bourbon Cadet branch of the House of Capet Born: 27 September 1601 Died: 14 May 1643
Regnal titles
Preceded by Henry IV and III	King of France; 1610 – 1643	Succeeded by Louis XIV
Preceded by Henry IV and III	King of Navarre; 1610 – 1620	French annexation
French royalty
Preceded by Francis	Dauphin of France; 1601 – 1610	Succeeded by Louis
