= 1620 Robben Island earthquake =

1620 South Africa Earthquake

Coordinates: 33.810°S 18.352°E

The 1620 Robben island earthquake is widely accepted as the oldest recorded earthquake in South African history. It reportedly occurred on 7 April 1620, off Robben Island, with a Mercalli intensity of II – IV (Weak–Light). The event was observed by Augustin de Beaulieu, who was leading a fleet of three ships on Table Bay at the time, who recorded "two startling thunderclaps like cannon shots while ship was becalmed near Robben Island" between 6:00 and 7:00.

In 2012, Sharad Master of the South African Journal of Science has disputed the accuracy of the recording of the event, concluding that the thunderclaps were very likely atmospheric phenomena. He argues that it was the slight quake which occurred off Cape Town in 1690 which is actually the oldest recorded one in South Africa which can be verified, of Mercalli intensity III.
