= Siege of La Rochelle =

1627–1628 siege of the Huguenot rebellions

- Part of the Huguenot rebellions and the Anglo-French War (1627–1629)
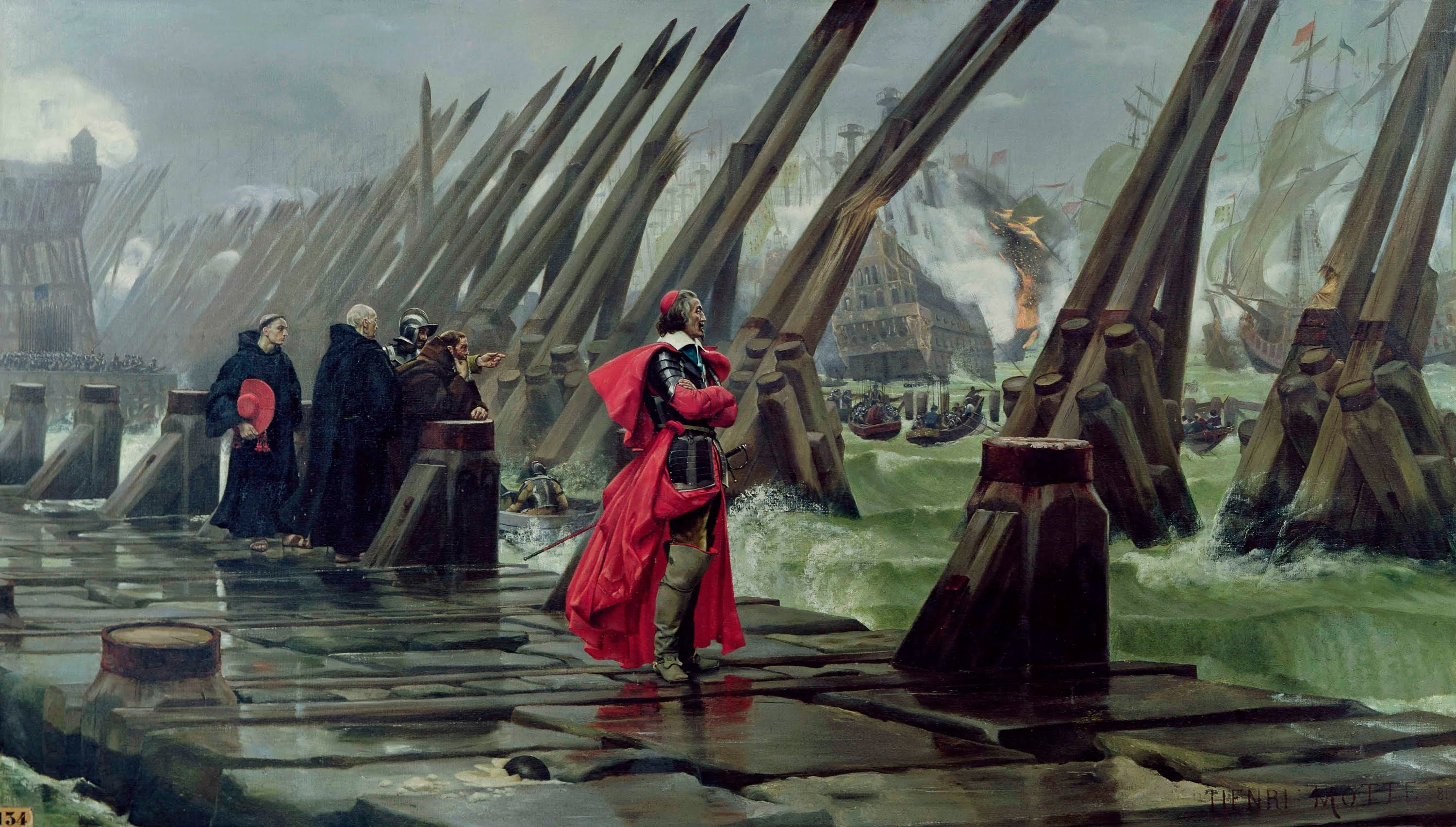
- 1881 painting of Cardinal Richelieu at the siege
Date	10 September 1627 – 28 October 1628
Location	La Rochelle 46.1667°N 1.1500°W
Result	French Royalist victory

Belligerents
(Kingdom of France) French colonial empire (French Royalists) Spanish Empire	La Rochelle; Huguenots England

Commanders and leaders
(Kingdom of France) Louis XIII (Kingdom of France) Cardinal Richelieu (siege commander) (Kingdom of France) Toiras (Governor of Île de Ré) (Kingdom of France) Bassompierre	Jean Guiton (mayor); Soubise (commander) (Kingdom of England) Duke of Buckingham (commander)

Strength
Siege army: 22,000; Toiras: 1,200 alongside 30–40 Spanish ships	La Rochelle: 27,000 civilians and soldiers Buckingham: 80 ships, 7,000 soldiers

Casualties and losses
Siege army: Unknown; Toiras: 500 killed	La Rochelle: 22,000 killed Buckingham: 5,000 killed

The siege of La Rochelle (French: le siège de La Rochelle, or sometimes le grand siège de La Rochelle) was a result of a war between the French royal forces of King Louis XIII and the Huguenots of La Rochelle in 1627–1628. The siege marked the height of the struggle between the Catholics and the Protestants in France and French territories, and ended with a complete victory for Louis XIII and the Catholics.

== Background ==
The 1598 Edict of Nantes that ended the French Wars of Religion granted Protestants, commonly known as Huguenots, a large degree of autonomy and self-rule. La Rochelle was the centre of Huguenot seapower, and a key point of resistance against the Catholic royal government.

The assassination of Henry IV of France in 1610 led to the appointment of Marie de' Medici as regent for her nine-year-old son, Louis XIII. Her removal in 1617 caused a series of revolts by powerful regional nobles, both Catholic and Protestant, while religious tensions were heightened by the outbreak of the 1618 to 1648 Thirty Years War. In 1621, Louis re-established Catholicism in the formerly Huguenot region of Béarn, resulting in an uprising led by Henri de Rohan and his brother Soubise.

Despite the royalist capture of Saint-Jean d'Angély, a blockade of La Rochelle was unsuccessful and the revolt ended in stalemate with the October 1622 Treaty of Montpellier. Taking La Rochelle was a priority for Louis and his chief minister Cardinal Richelieu; it was then the second- or third-largest city in France, with over 30,000 inhabitants, and one of its most important ports. In addition to the customs duties generated by imports, it was also among the biggest producers of salt, a major source of taxes for the state; this made it economically crucial.

Defeating Rohan and taking possession of La Rochelle were both essential for Richelieu's policy of centralisation, but since the French Crown did not have a navy strong enough to capture it, he asked England for help. When James I refused, he approached the Dutch Republic. The Protestant Dutch agreed to provide naval backing in the 1624 Treaty of Compiègne.

== English intervention ==
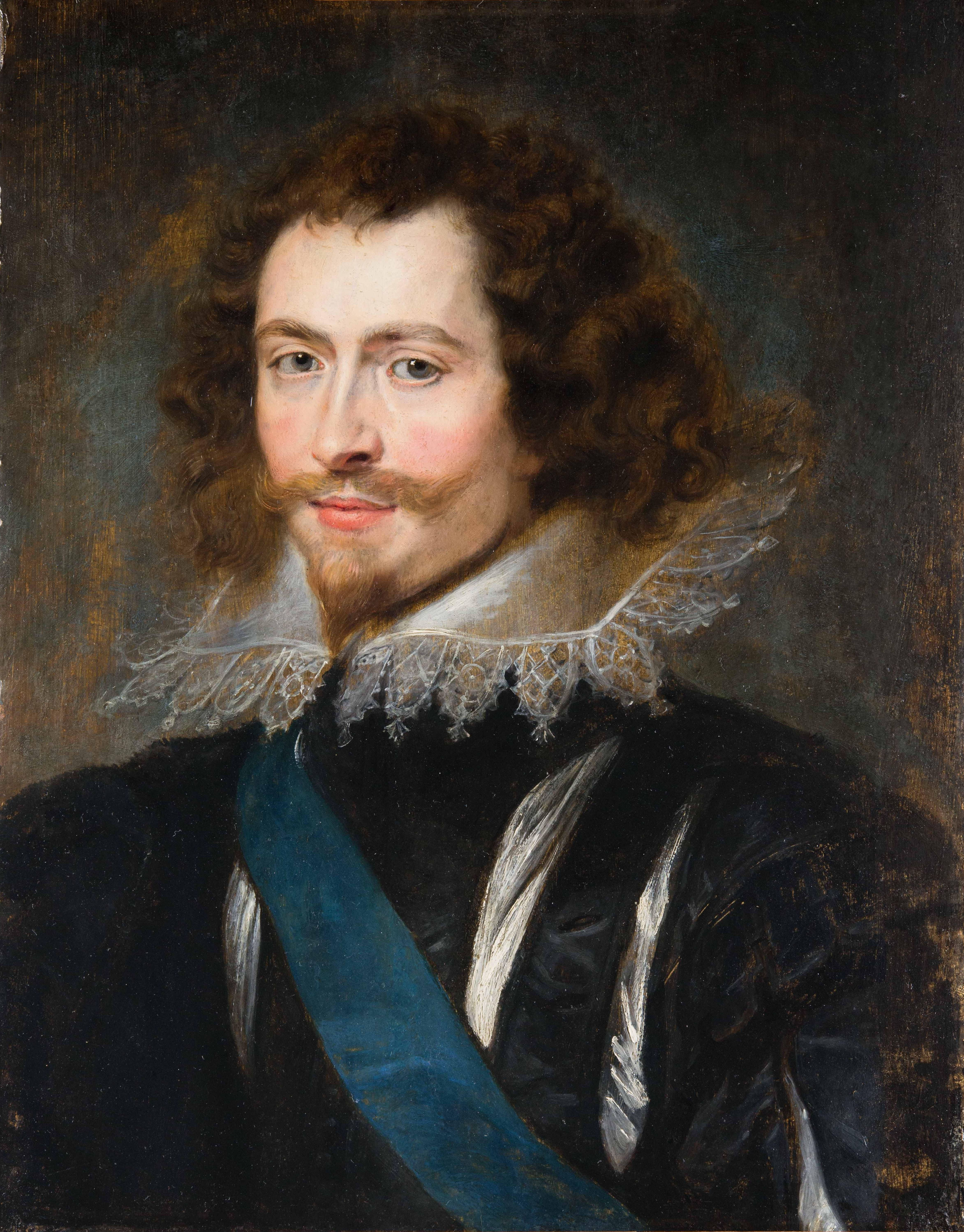
The Duke of Buckingham attempted to lift the siege.

The Anglo-French conflict followed the failure of their alliance of 1624, in which England had tried to find an ally in France against the power of the Habsburgs. In 1626, France under Richelieu concluded a secret peace with Spain, and disputes arose around Henrietta Maria's household. Furthermore, France was building the power of its navy, leading the English to be convinced that France must be opposed "for reasons of state".

In June 1626, Walter Montagu was sent to France to contact dissident noblemen, and from March 1627 attempted to organize a French rebellion. The plan was to send an English fleet to encourage rebellion, triggering a new Huguenot revolt by Duke Henri de Rohan and his brother Soubise.

=== First La Rochelle expedition ===
On the first expedition, King Charles I sent a fleet of over 100 ships, under his favourite George Villiers, 1st Duke of Buckingham, to encourage a major rebellion in La Rochelle. In June 1627, Buckingham organised a landing on the nearby island of Île de Ré with 6,000 men in order to help the Huguenots, thus starting the Anglo-French War of 1627, with the objectives being to control the approaches to La Rochelle and to encourage the rebellion in the city.

The city of La Rochelle initially refused to declare itself an ally of Buckingham against the crown of France and effectively denied access to its harbour to Buckingham's fleet. An open alliance would be declared only in September, during the first fights between La Rochelle and royal troops.

Although it was a Protestant stronghold, Île de Ré had not directly joined the rebellion against the king. On Île de Ré, the English under Buckingham tried to take the fortified city of Saint-Martin in the siege of Saint-Martin-de-Ré (1627) but were repulsed after three months. Small French royal boats managed to supply St Martin in spite of the English blockade. Buckingham ultimately ran out of money and support, and his army was weakened by disease. After a last attack on Saint-Martin, they were repulsed with heavy casualties and left with their ships.

== Siege ==
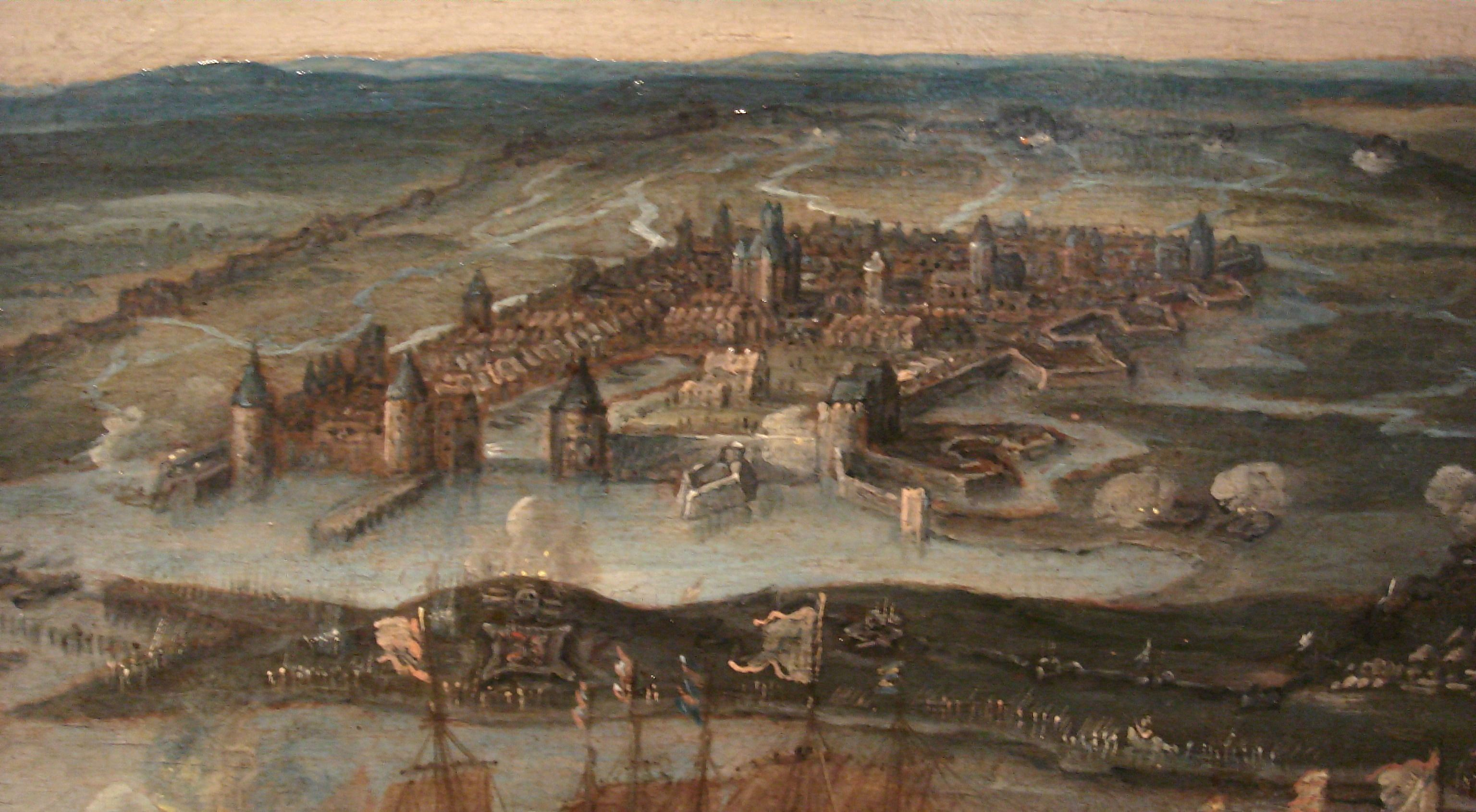
La Rochelle during the siege

Meanwhile, in August 1627 French royal forces started to surround La Rochelle, with an army of 7,000 soldiers, 600 horses, and 24 cannons, led by Charles of Angoulême. They started to reinforce fortifications at Bongraine (modern Les Minimes), and at the Fort Louis.

On September 10, the first cannon shots were fired by La Rochelle against royal troops at Fort Louis, starting the third Huguenot rebellion. La Rochelle was the greatest stronghold among the Huguenot cities of France, and the centre of Huguenot resistance. Cardinal Richelieu acted as commander of the besiegers when the King was absent.

Once hostilities started, French engineers isolated the city with entrenchments 12 kilometers (7.5 mi) long, fortified by 11 forts and 18 redoubts. The surrounding fortifications were completed in April 1628, manned with an army of 30,000.

Four thousand workmen also built a 1,400-meter-long (0.87 mi) seawall to block the seaward access between the city and harbor, stopping all supplies. The initial idea for blocking the channel came from the Italian engineer Pompeo Targone, but his structure was broken by winter weather, before the idea was taken up by the royal architect Clément Métezeau in November 1627. The wall was built on a foundation of sunken hulks filled with rubble. French artillery battered English ships trying to supply the city.

Meanwhile, in southern France, Henri de Rohan vainly attempted to raise a rebellion to relieve La Rochelle. Until February, some ships were able to go through the seawall under construction, but after March this became impossible. The city was completely blockaded, with the only hope coming from possible intervention by an English fleet.

=== Foreign support for the French Crown ===
==== Dutch support ====
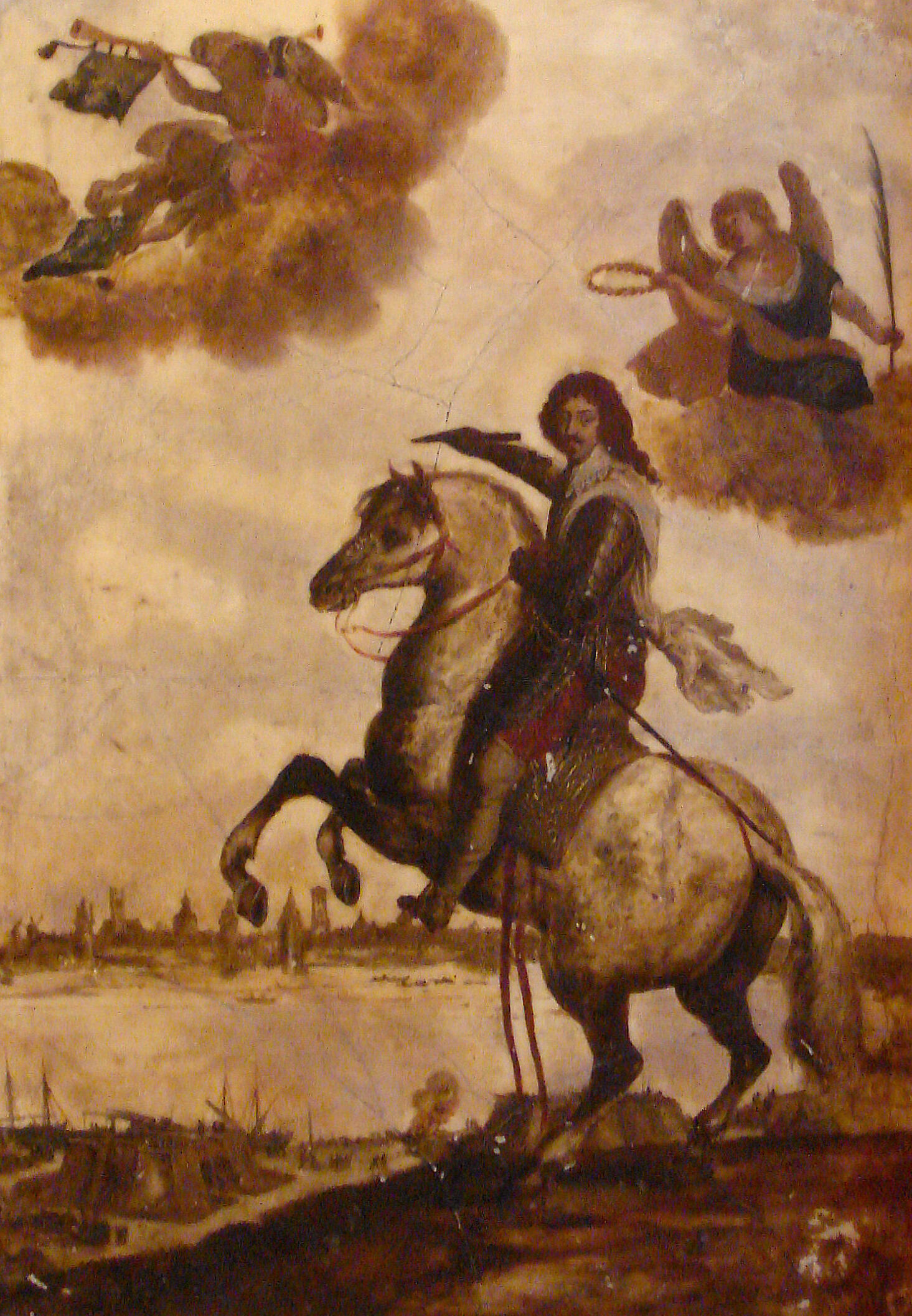
Painting of Louis XIII at the siege

The Roman Catholic government of France rented ships from the Protestant city of Amsterdam to conquer the Protestant city of La Rochelle. This resulted in a debate in the city council of Amsterdam as to whether the French soldiers should be allowed to have a Roman Catholic sermon on board of the Protestant Dutch ships. The result of the debate was that it was not allowed. The Dutch ships transported the French soldiers to La Rochelle. France was a Dutch ally in the war against the Habsburgs.

==== Spanish alliance ====
In the occasion of the siege of La Rochelle, Spain manoeuvered towards the formation of a Franco-Spanish alliance against the common enemies that were the English, the Huguenots, and the Dutch. Richelieu accepted Spanish help, and a Spanish fleet of 30 to 40 warships was sent from Corunna to the Gulf of Morbihan as an affirmation of strategic support, arriving three weeks after the departure of Buckingham from Île de Ré. At one point, the Spanish fleet anchored in front of La Rochelle, but did not engage in actual operations against the city.

=== English relief efforts ===
England attempted to send two more fleets to relieve La Rochelle.

==== Second La Rochelle expedition ====
A naval force led by William Feilding, Earl of Denbigh, left in April 1628, but returned without a fight to Portsmouth, as Denbigh said that he had no commission to hazard the king's ships in a fight, and returned shamefully to Portsmouth.

==== Third La Rochelle expedition ====
A third fleet was dispatched under the Admiral of the Fleet, the Earl of Lindsey in September 1628, consisting of 29 warships and 31 merchantmen. In September 1628, the English fleet tried to relieve the city. After bombarding French positions and failing to force the sea wall, the English fleet had to withdraw. Following this last disappointment, the city surrendered on 28 October 1628.

== Epilogue ==
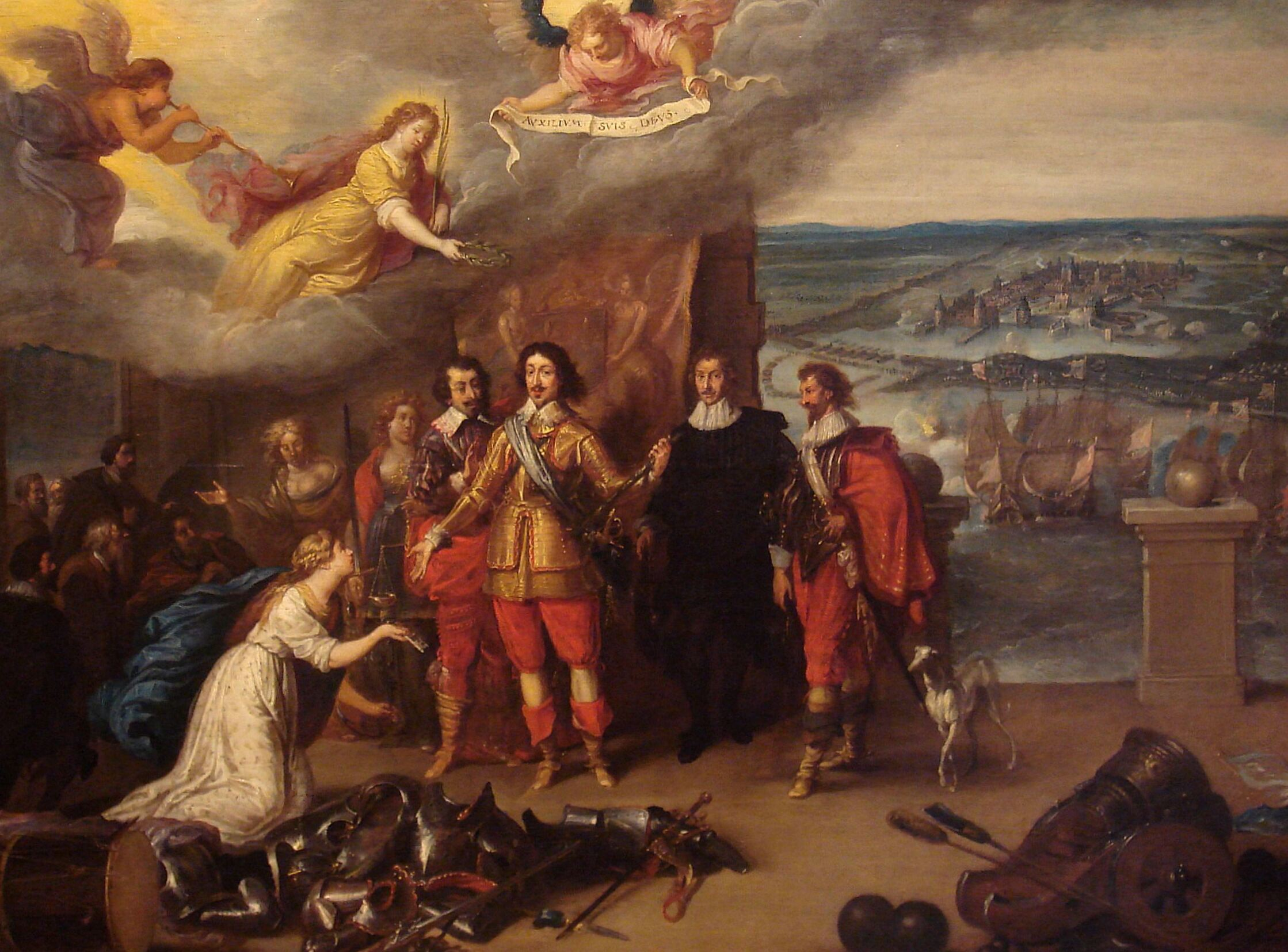
The surrender of La Rochelle, 17th century painting

Residents of La Rochelle had resisted for 14 months, under the leadership of the city's mayor Jean Guiton and with gradually diminishing help from England due to her failure to lift the siege. During the long siege, the population of La Rochelle decreased from 27,000 to 5,000 mostly due to mass deportation of civilians fleeing the conflict, with only the most devout staying. Surrender of the city was unconditional, but most were given clemency. By the terms of the Peace of Alais, the Huguenots lost their territorial, political, and military rights, but retained the religious freedom granted by the Edict of Nantes.

Aside from its religious aspect, the siege of La Rochelle marks an important success in the creation of a strong central government of France, in control throughout its territory and able to suppress regional defiance. In the immediate aftermath was the growth of the absolute monarchy, but it had long-term effects upon all later French regimes up to the present. The French philosopher Descartes is known to have visited the scene of the siege in 1627. The siege was depicted in detail by numerous artists such as Jacques Callot and marked by the 1635 painting Louis XIII Crowned by Victory.

== Numismatics ==
Around the time of the siege, a series of propaganda coins were struck to describe the stakes of the siege, and then commemorate the royal victory. These coins depict the siege in symbolic ways, showing the city and the English effort in a poor light, while putting an advantageous light on royal might.

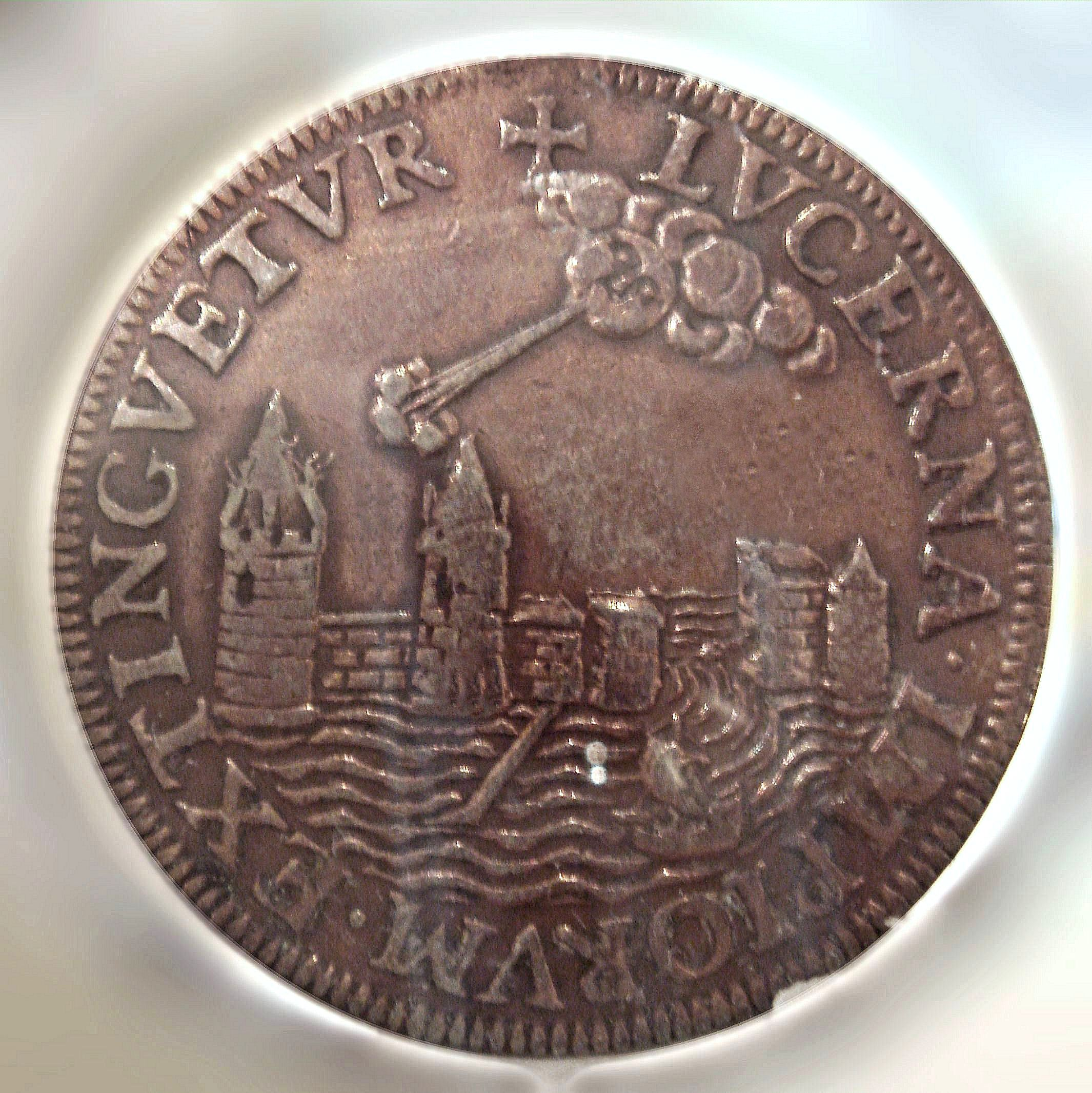
Lucerna Impiorum Extinguetur ("The beacon of the impious will be extinguished"), 1626.

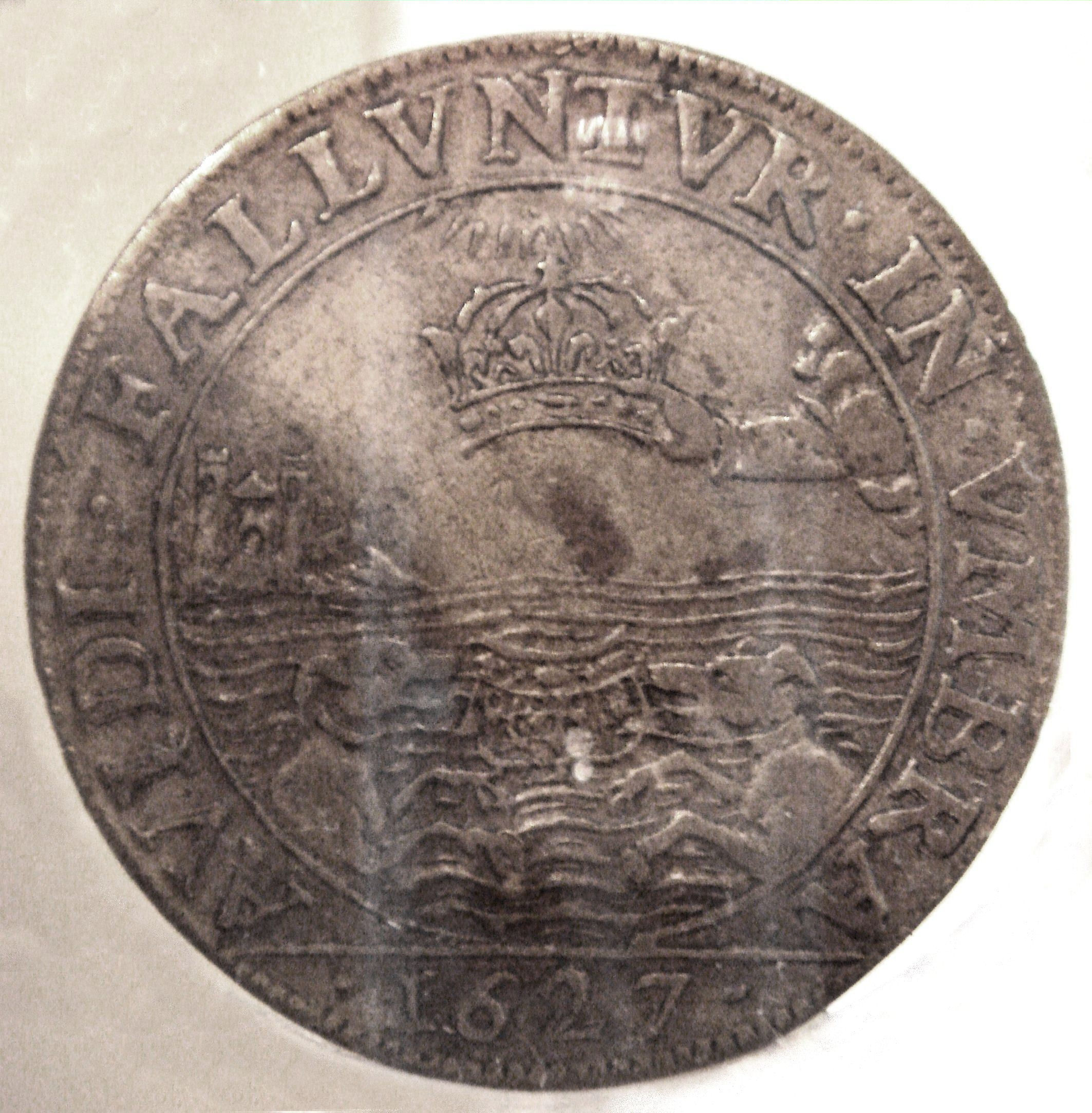
Two dogs in the water around the reflection of a crown 1627.

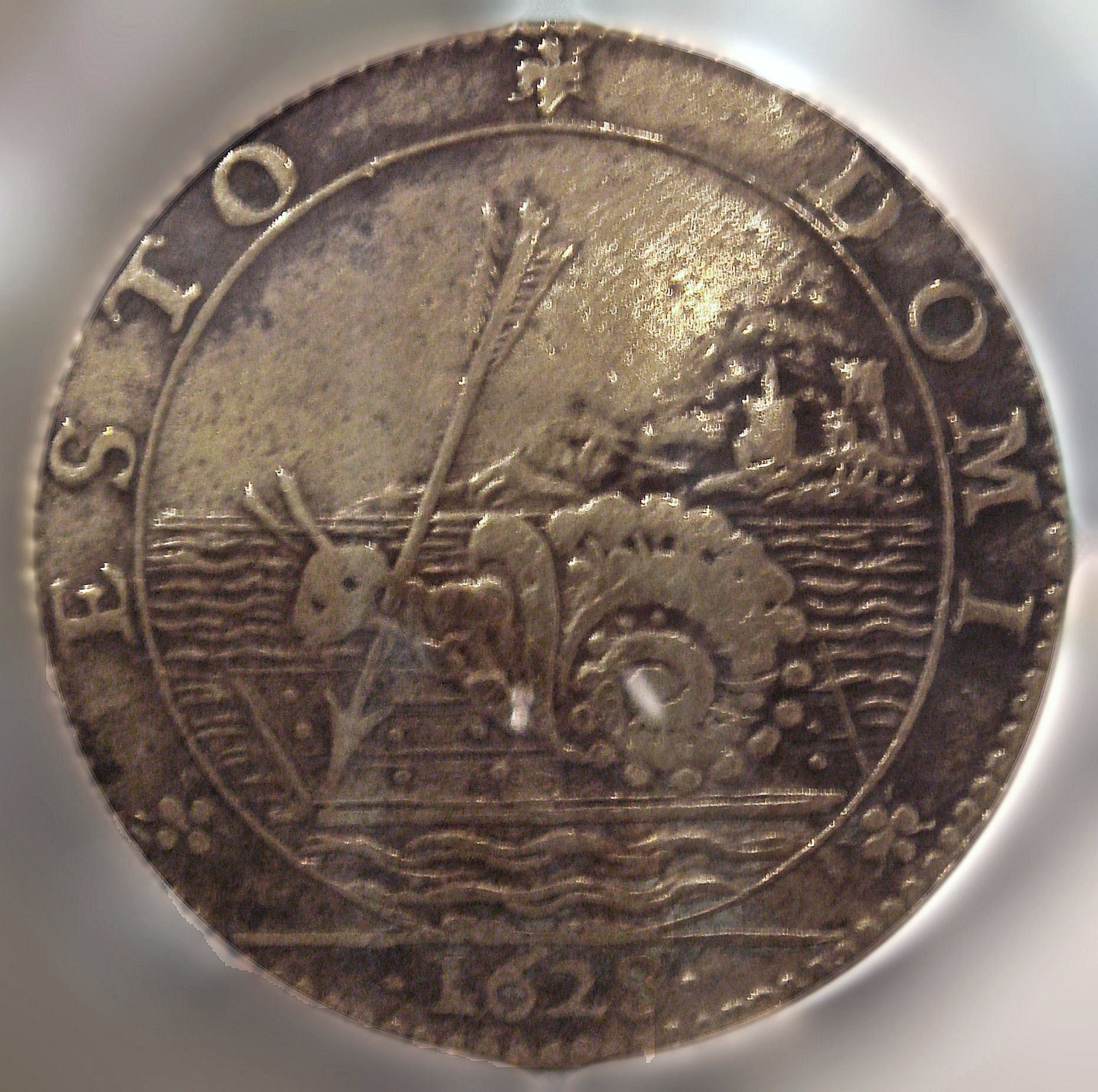
English snail pierced by an arrow on a raft, Esto Domi ("Go Home"), 1628.

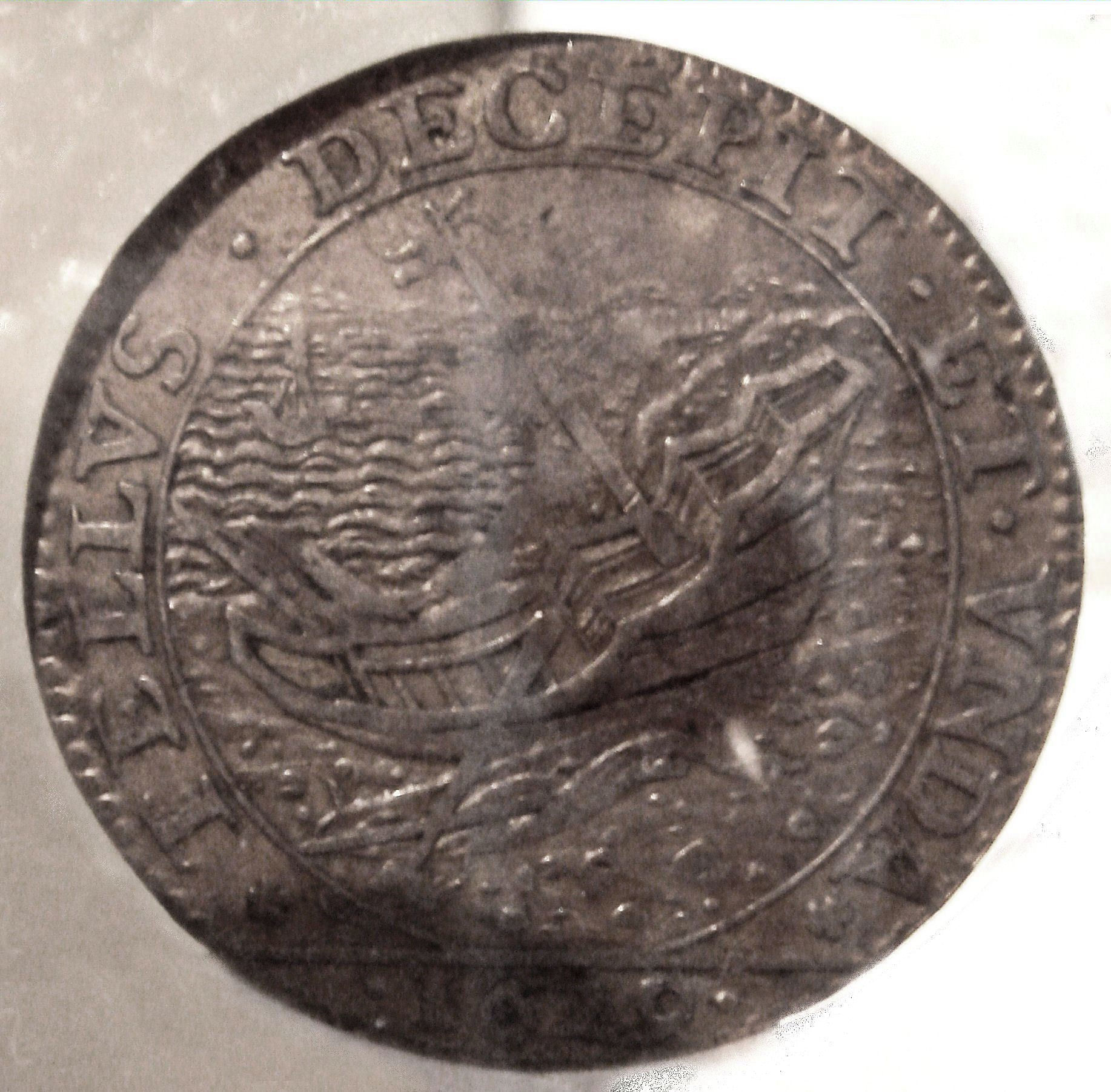
Vanquished English ship, Tellus decepit et Unda, 1629.

== Sources ==
- Duffy, Christopher (1995). Siege Warfare: The Fortress in the Early Modern World 1494–1660. Routledge. ISBN 978-0415146494.
- Gillespie, Alexander (2017). The Causes of War Volume III: 1400 CE to 1650 CE. Hart Publishing. ISBN 978-1849466462.
- Glete, Jan (1999). Warfare at sea, 1500–1650: maritime conflicts and the transformation of Europe. Routledge. ISBN 978-0415214551.
- Palm, Franklin Charles (1923). "The Siege and Capture of La Rochelle in 1628: Its Economic Significance". Journal of Political Economy. 31 (1): 114–127. doi:10.1086/253493. JSTOR 1823071. S2CID 153639520.
- Parker, Geoffrey (1997). The Thirty Years War. Routledge. ISBN 978-0415154581.
- Sturdy, David (2002). Fractured Europe: 1600–1721 (Blackwell History of Europe). Wiley & Sons. ISBN 978-0631205128.
