= Tiku, Iran =

Tiku تيكو
- Village
- Location within Iran
- Coordinates: 27°24′19″N 55°58′44″E
- Country: Iran
- Province: Hormozgan
- County: Bandar Abbas
- Bakhsh: Fin
- Rural District: Fin

Population (2006)
  - Total: 40
- Time zone: UTC+3:30 (IRST)
  - Summer (DST): UTC+4:30 (IRDT)

Tiku (Persian: تيكو, also Romanized as Tīkū; also known as Tīkūh) is a village in Fin Rural District, Fin District, Bandar Abbas County, Hormozgan Province, Iran. At the 2006 census, its population was 40, in 7 families.
