= Ollier =

Ollier is a surname. Notable people with the surname include:

- Charles Ollier (1788–1859), publisher
- Charly Ollier (born 1985), football player
- Claude Ollier (1922–2014), writer
- Cliff Ollier (born 1931), geologist
- Edmund Ollier (1827–1886), journalist
- Louis Léopold Ollier (1830–1900), surgeon
- Patrick Ollier (born 1944), politician
- Rémy Ollier (1816–1845), Mauritan activist

== See also ==
- Ollier disease, disease of cartilage
