= Les Vans =

- Commune
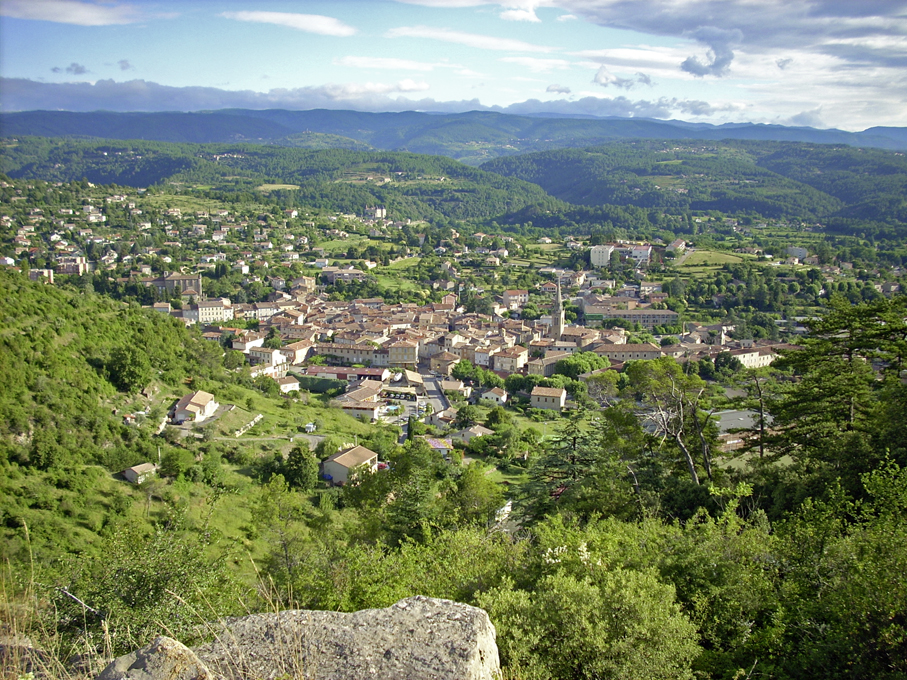
- A general view of Les Vans

- Coat of arms
- Location of Les Vans
- Location within France Location within Auvergne-Rhône-Alpes
- Coordinates: 44°24′21″N 4°07′58″E
- Country: France
- Region: Auvergne-Rhône-Alpes
- Department: Ardèche
- Arrondissement: Largentière
- Canton: Les Cévennes ardéchoises
- Intercommunality: Pays des Vans en Cévennes

Government
  - Mayor (2020–2026): Jean-Marc Michel
- Area^{1}: 31.09 km^{2} (12.00 sq mi)
- Elevation: 170 m (560 ft)
- Highest elevation: 948 m (3,110 ft)
- Lowest elevation: 126 m (413 ft)
- Population (2023): 2,662
  - Density: 85.62/km^{2} (221.8/sq mi)
- Time zone: UTC+01:00 (CET)
  - Summer (DST): UTC+02:00 (CEST)
- INSEE/Postal code: 07334 /07140
- ^{1} French Land Register data, which excludes lakes, ponds, glaciers > 1 km^{2} (0.386 sq mi or 247 acres) and river estuaries.

Les Vans (French pronunciation: [le vɑ̃s]; Occitan: Los Vans) is a commune in the Ardèche department in the Auvergne-Rhône-Alpes region of southern France.

== Geography ==
The village of Les Vans, the principal settlement of the canton of the same name in the south of the Ardèche, lies at the centre of a basin near the Chassezac river. Dominant to the south is the Serre de Barre, the last western summit of the Cévennes du Bas-Vivarais range. In 2001, Les Vans became the "gateway town" of the Monts d'Ardèche Natural Regional Park.

The village is a tourist haven in summer; a traditional market is held every Saturday morning.

A night-time craft market is held on summer Tuesdays at the Place de la Fontaine.

Many activities are available in the vicinity of Les Vans: walking, climbing, caving, horse riding, canyoning, swimming, fishing and kayaking in the Chassezac gorges.

== History ==
Les Vans was a dependency of the Abbey of Saint-Gilles. The town became Protestant in the 16th century; in 1629 it returned to Catholicism, and its fortifications were dismantled.

On the death of Professor Ollier (1900), who lived near the village church, a world-wide subscription paid for the erection of two monumental bronze statues, created by Boucher. One at Les Vans on Grande Place Ollier, the other at Place Ollier in Lyon. The Vanséens' cunning preserved the first from the covetousness of the Germans during the Second World War, though the second was melted down by the Wehrmacht in 1941.

In 1973, the commune of Les Vans absorbed the former communes of Brahic, Chassagnes and Naves.

== Administration ==
List of Mayors
From	To	Name	Party	Notes
4 February 1867	September 1870	Jacques Duclaux-Monteil		
May 1871	14 January 1878	Jacques Duclaux-Monteil		
1888	1939	Jules Duclaux-Monteil		
1965	1979	Fernand Aubert	DVD	
1979	2004	Jean-Marie Roux	UMP	Député from 1993 to 1997
March 2004	2014	Bruno Vigier	NC	

== Population ==
Its residents are called Vanséens in French.

Historical population
Year	Pop.	±% p.a.
1968	2,443	—
1975	2,325	−0.70%
1982	2,570	+1.44%
1990	2,668	+0.47%
1999	2,664	−0.02%
2007	2,820	+0.71%
2012	2,774	−0.33%
2017	2,672	−0.75%
2023	2,662	−0.06%
Source: INSEE

== Sights ==
=== Les Vans ===
- Historic centre (many buildings of the 16th to 19th centuries)
- Church of Saint-Pierre (dating from the seventeenth century); fine walnut retable of 17th century
- Protestant church with pillars, inaugurated on 7 May 1826
- Gorges of the river Chassezac
- Païolive wood
- Les Vans is the starting point of many excursions and walks in the Cévennes Vivarais region

=== The hamlet of Naves ===
Medieval village, ranked among the most beautiful villages in France and called "a characteristic village of the Ardèche". Naves had its moment of glory in the 19th century with the development of sericulture and silkwork breeding. This activity declined bit by bit and fell into disuse. The village, its church and its ancient alleys were the subject of important renovations in the mid-1980s.

==== Sights ====
- Romanesque church of Saint-Jacques from the 12th and 13th centuries, recently restored
- Ancient cobbled streets and vaulted passages
- Ruins of the ancient castle and ramparts
- Starting point of many excursions and walks

=== The hamlet of Chassagnes ===
- Sandy and pebble beach beside the river Chassezac
- The hermitage of Saint-Eugène was built on a limestone cliff overlooking the valley of the Chassezac and Chassagnes.

Some years ago it was the subject of restoration which brought it back to life after more than two centuries of decay, returning it to something like its original purpose. Notable on this site are some very fine reproduction Byzantine frescoes which have recently been produced, free of charge, by an iconographic painter.

=== The hamlet of Brahic ===
The hamlet of Brahic nestles on the south face of the Serre de Barre. Sights:

- The ancient village of Brahic
- Romanesque church of Notre Dame de l'Assomption with its arcaded tower (12th century)
- Picturesque hamlets of Murjas and Perriès

== Economy ==
- Oil mill "Froment" (site : )
- Textile factory Payen

== Events ==
- Craft market every Saturday morning
- Olive festival on the 3rd Sunday in July
- "Castagnade" chestnut festival on the last Saturday in October
- "Potters' market" and "leather-wood? market" in July
- Footpath festival on Pentecost Monday
- Ard'Afrique festival in August: African culture, jazz, cultural displays, concerts, exhibitions, dance ...

== Personalities ==
- Eugène de Malbos (1811–1858), born in Les Vans, was a Romantic painter known for his lithographs.
- Louis Léopold Ollier (1830–1900), inventor of orthopaedics and reconstructive surgery, was born in Les Vans
- Léonce Vieljeux (1865–1944), Mayor of La Rochelle, reserve Colonel and network agent of the Allied Resistance, was born in Les Vans; he was executed at Struthof in 1944. The college at Les Vans today bears his name.
- Bernadette Perrin-Riou (born 1955), mathematician and recipient of the Satter Prize, was born in Les Vans.

== Gallery ==
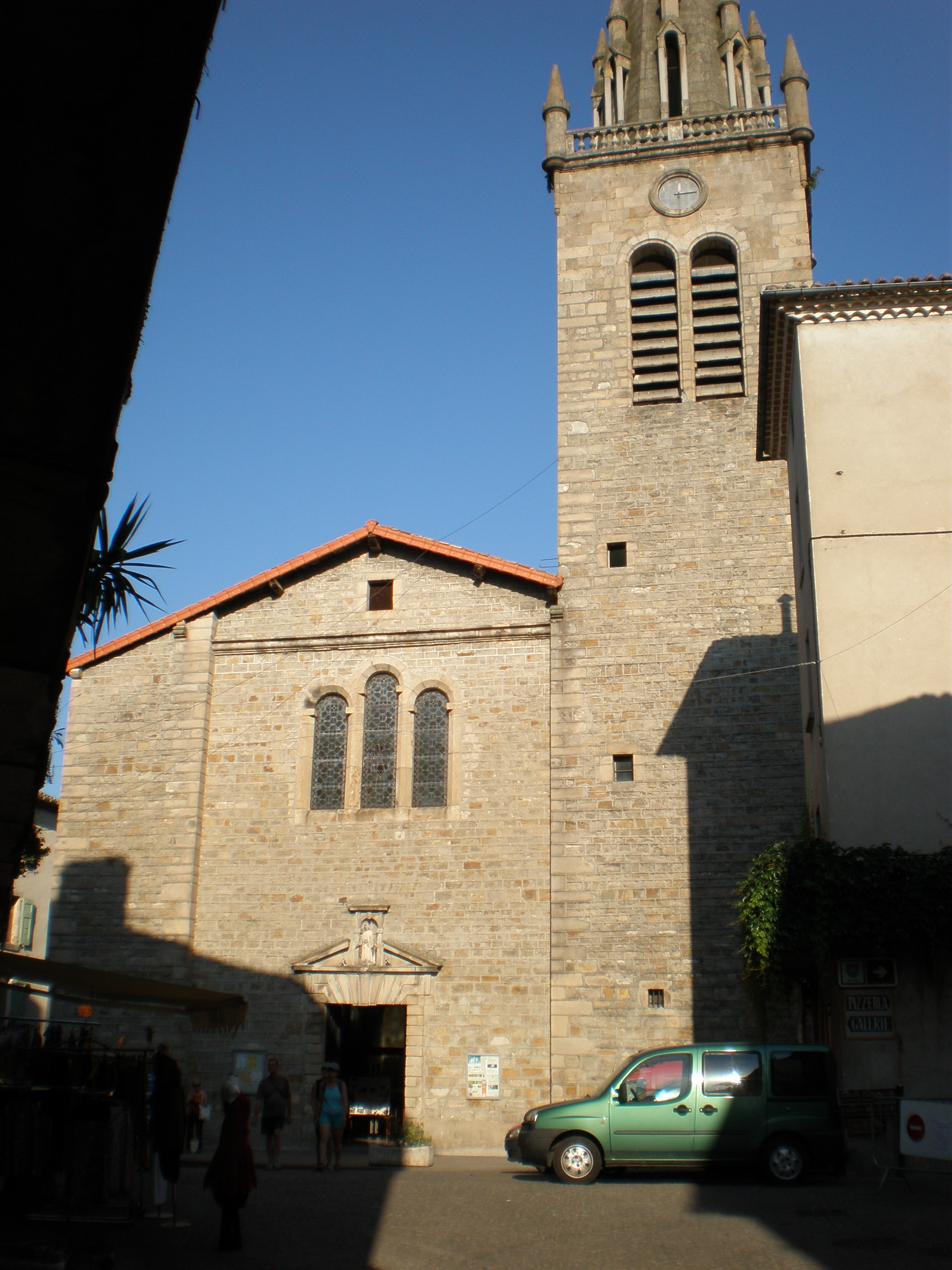
The Church of Saint-Pierre des Vans

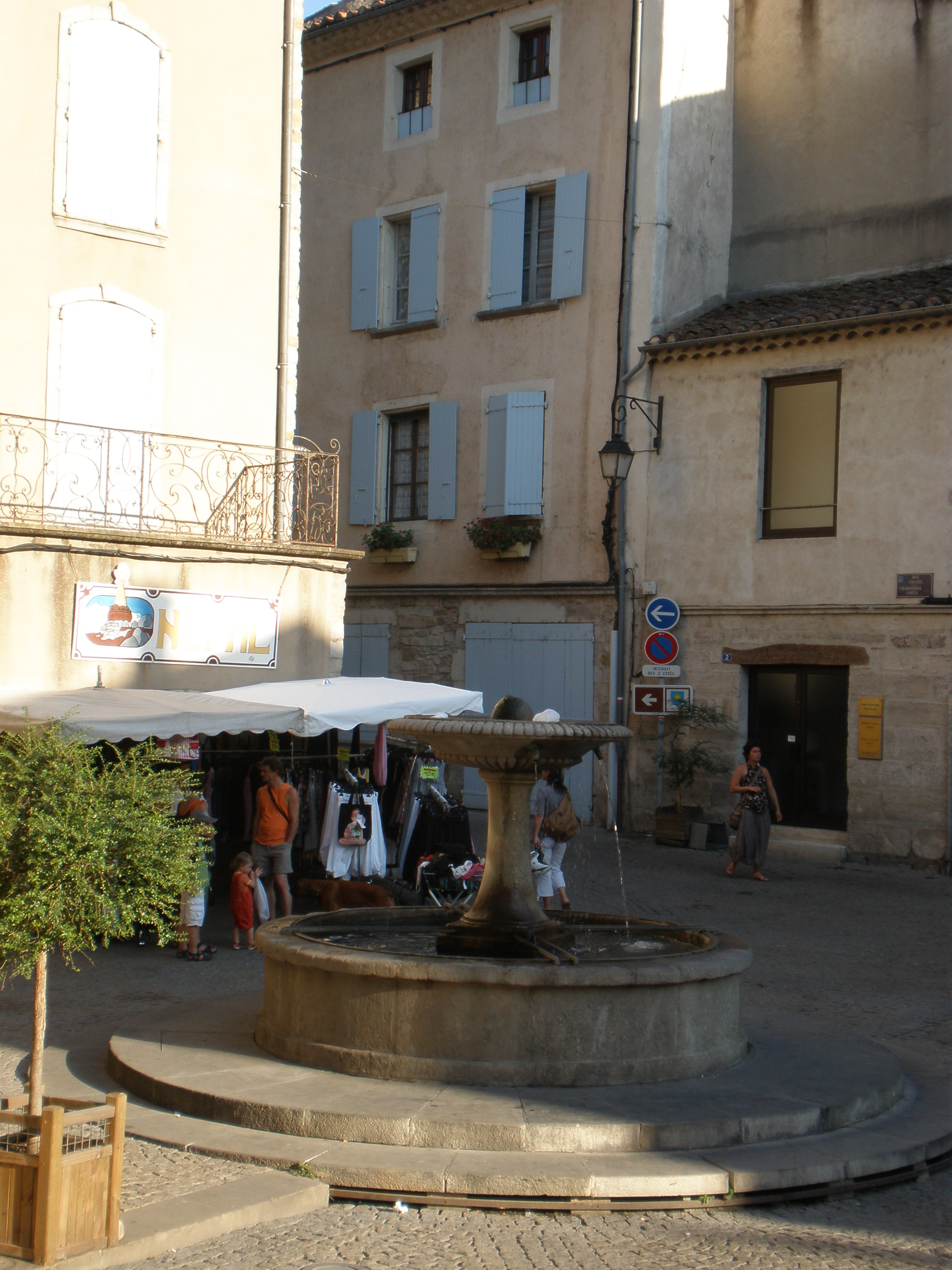
The Market

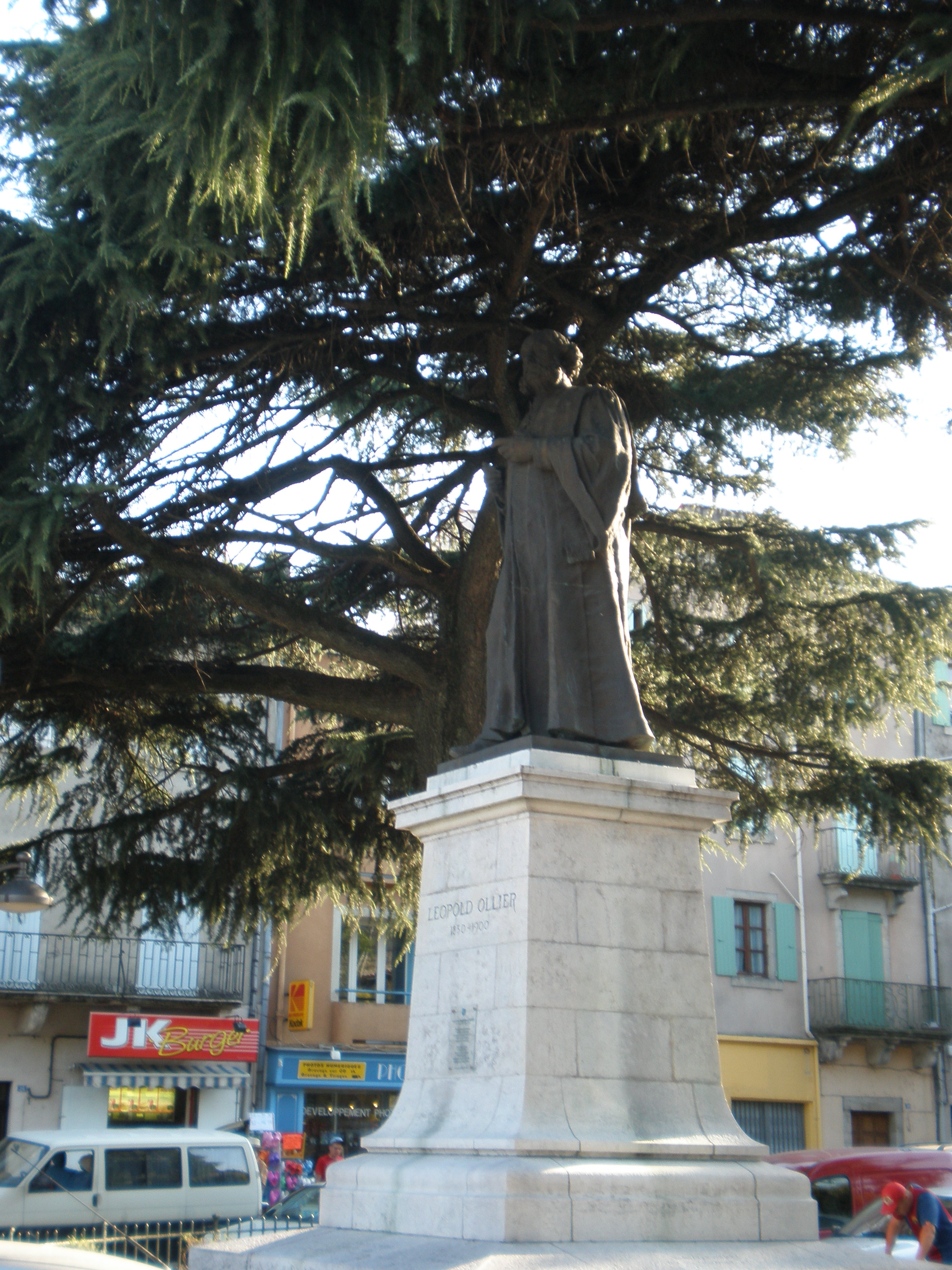
The Statue of Léopold Ollier

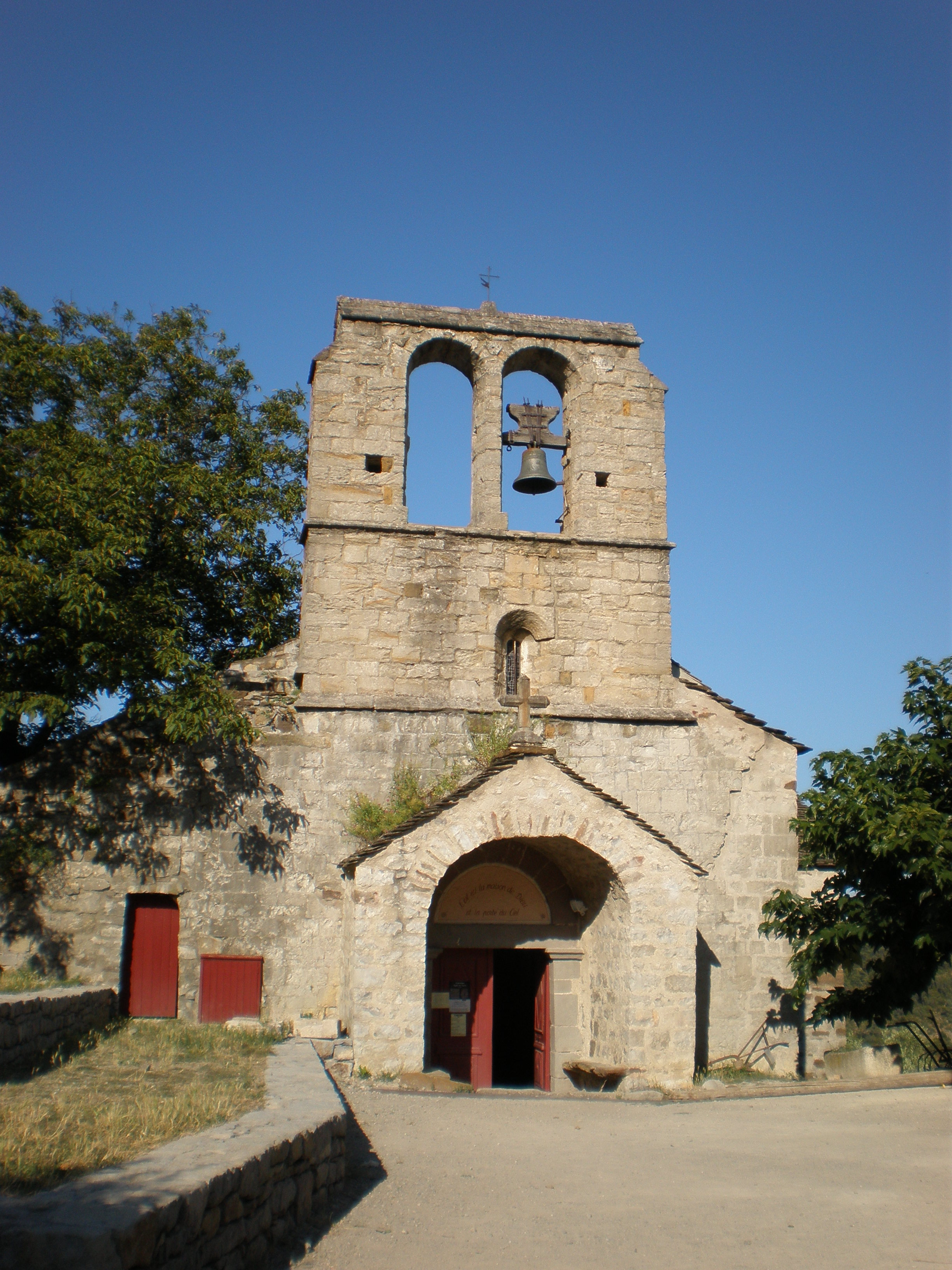
The Romanesque Church of Saint-Jacques de Naves

== See also ==
- Long-distance footpath Sentier de grande randonnée GR 4
- Communes of the Ardèche department
