= Hôtel de Ville, La Rochelle =

Town hall in La Rochelle, France

Hôtel de Ville
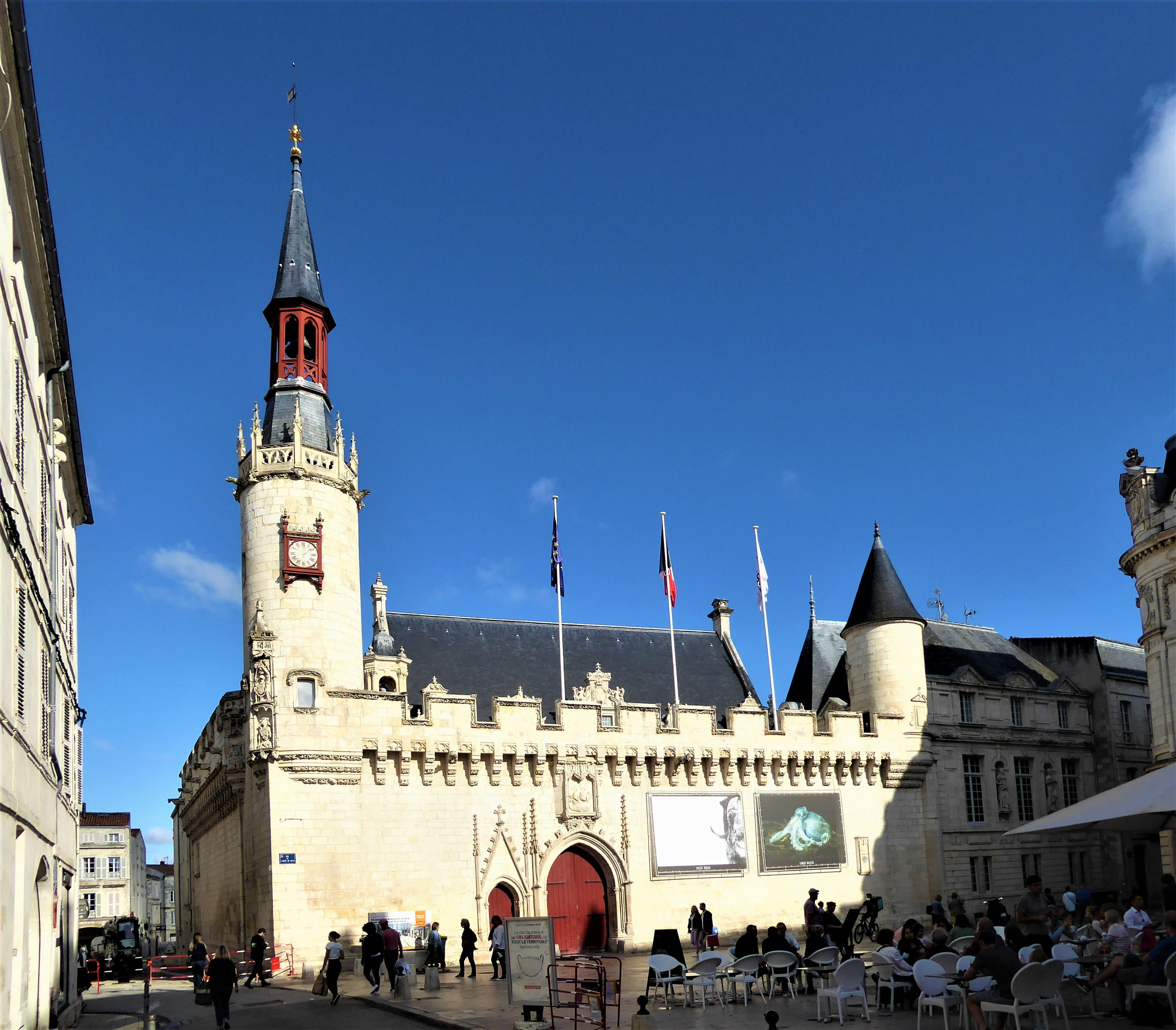
- The main frontage of the Hôtel de Ville in July 2021

General information
- Type: City hall
- Architectural style: Renaissance style
- Location: La Rochelle, France
- Coordinates: 46.1596°N 1.1512°W
- Completed: 1298

Monument historique
- Official name: Hôtel de ville
- Type: Inscrit
- Designated: 1861
- Reference no.: PA00104890

The Hôtel de Ville (French pronunciation: [otɛl də vil], City Hall) is a municipal building in La Rochelle, Charente-Maritime, western France, standing on Rue de l'Hôtel de Ville. The building was designated a monument historique by the French government in 1861.

== History ==
=== Early history ===
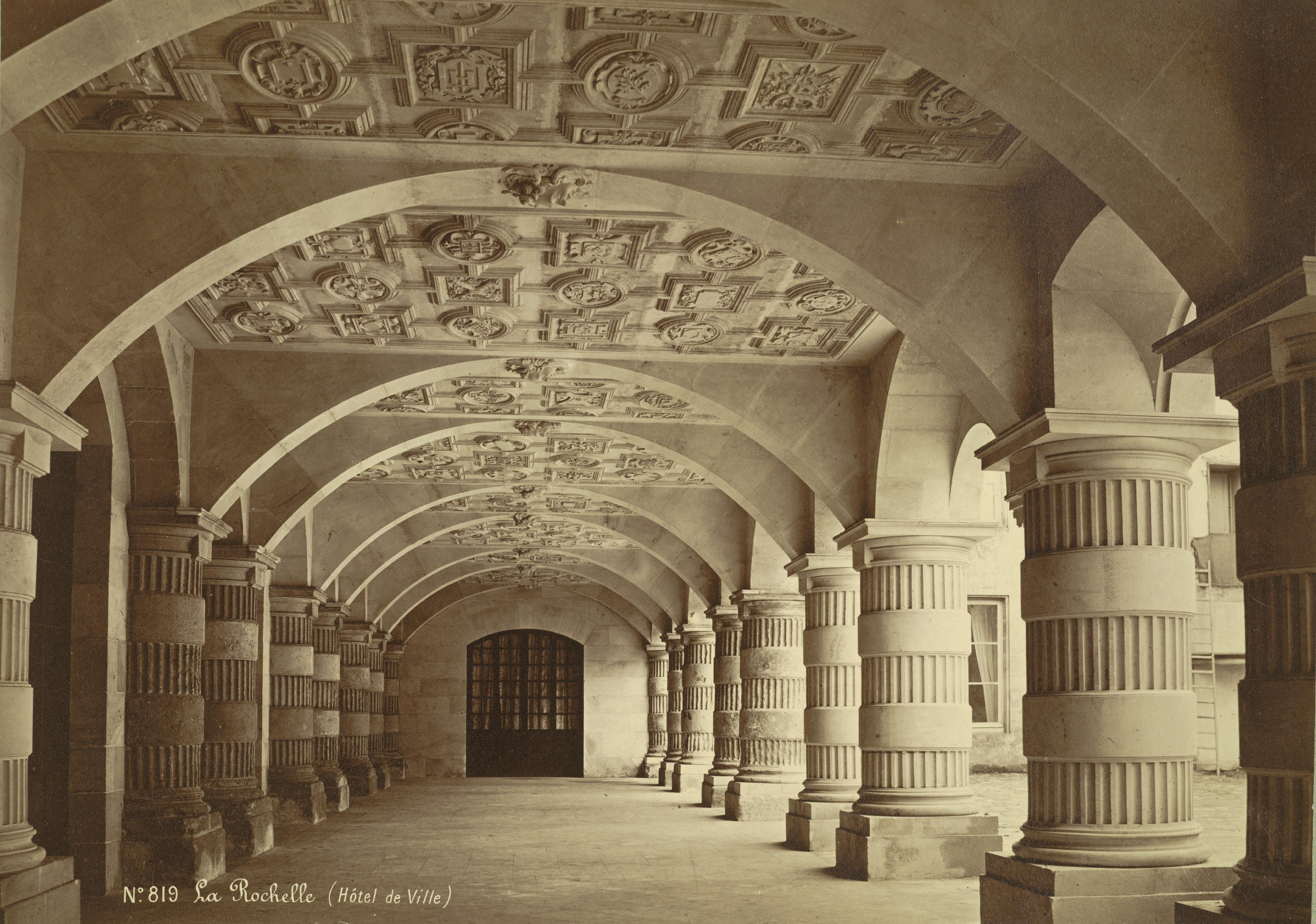
The Grande Galerie (the great gallery)

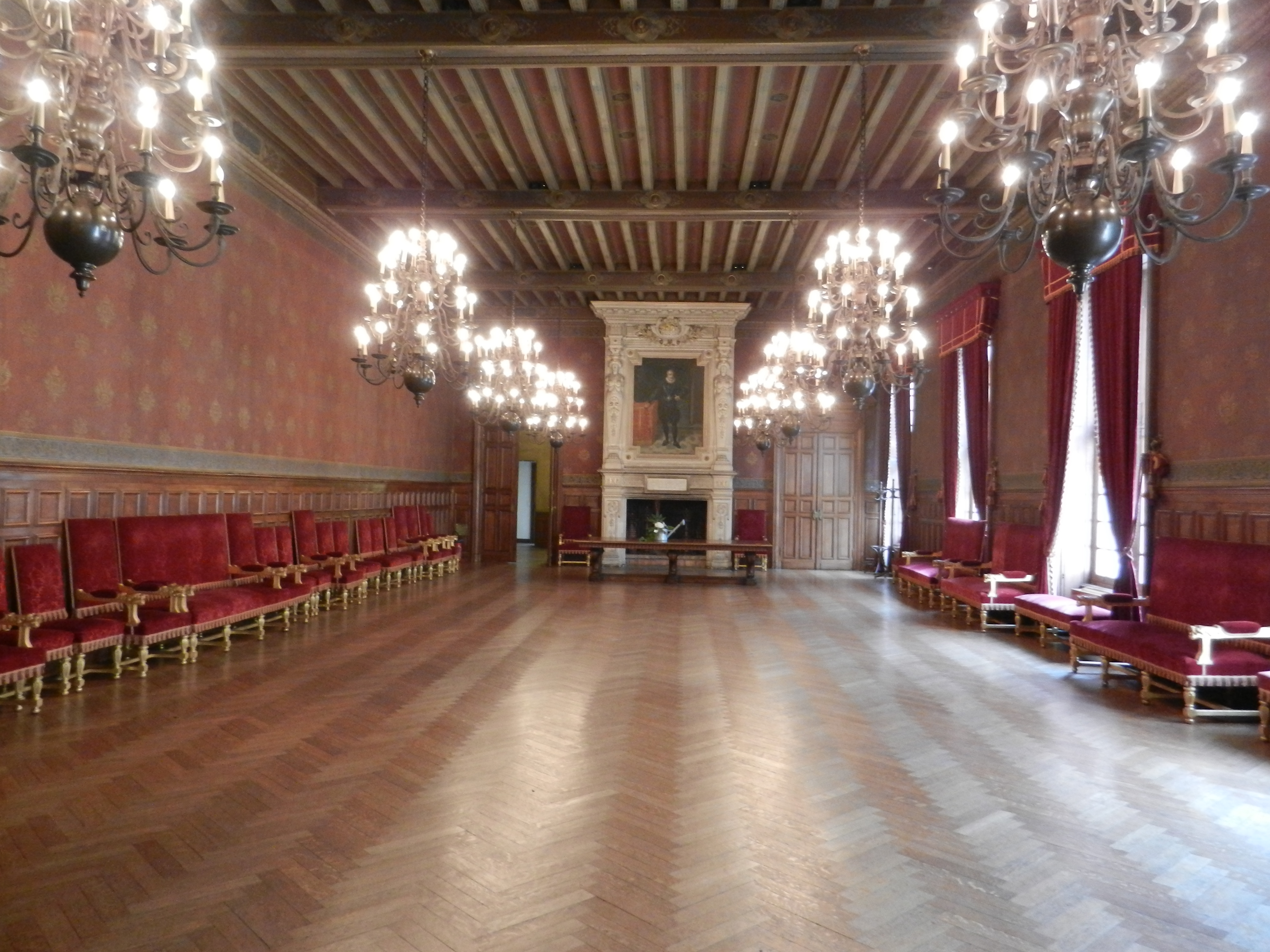
The Salle des Fêtes (the ballroom)

A century after Eleanor of Aquitaine granted the town a charter in 1199, the aldermen decided to establish their first town hall. They acquired five houses in the centre of the town in 1298, and amalgamated them to form a town hall.

After a major fire destroyed much of the structure in 1486, it was rebuilt with the northern wall being completed in 1492, and the western wall being completed in 1498. The design involved crenelated walls, corner turrets and a large arched opening in the western wall. The Grande Galerie (the great gallery) in the centre of the building was completed in 1606, and a narrow property known as the Bâtiment des Échevins (Aldermen's House) on the east side of the building, adjoining Rue des Gentilshommes, was acquired in 1607. The Salle des Fêtes (the ballroom) was created above the great galley and featured a fine fireplace, incorporating a copy of a painting by Frans Pourbus the Younger depicting Henry IV.

=== Huguenot rebellion and expansion ===
The guidons, seized by the huguenot leader, Benjamin, Duke of Soubise, from Royalist forces when he took control of Les Sables-d'Olonne during the Huguenot rebellions were installed in the building in 1622. The mayor, Jean Guiton, who was also a huguenot, organized an energetic resistance against Royalist forces during the siege of La Rochelle between 1627 and 1628 and the marble table with a chip made by his dagger, as he vowed to defend the city to the death, was also preserved there. After the Royalist victory at the end of the siege and the suppression of the Huguenots in 1628, Louis XIII confiscated the town hall and gave it to the new governor, Cardinal Richelieu.

The local council, reformed in 1718, met at the Maison Henry II (Henry II House) on Rue des Augustins and Rue Chaudrier, until 1748, when the council reacquired the town hall. A major restoration project was then undertaken to a design by Juste Lisch in the 1870s. This work included an extension to the south, a new grand staircase in the courtyard and a tall belfry at the northwest corner of the complex. Additional buildings, not already in the council's ownership, were acquired to the south and to the northeast of the existing structure in the first half of the 20th century. However, the original internal partitions were retained, and the additional buildings never fully consolidated to create an efficient integrated complex.

=== Recent history ===
In October 1911, a statue by the sculptor, Ernest Henri Dubois, of the huguenot, Jean Guiton, was unveiled in the Place de l'Hôtel de Ville. Then, in July 1948, General Charles de Gaulle unveiled a plaque on the town hall to commemorate the life of the former mayor, Léonce Vieljeux, who had refused to cooperate with a German officer who wanted a swastika flag hung on the town hall during the Second World War. Vieljeux was arrested, and subsequently executed at Natzweiler-Struthof concentration camp. In May 1992, a Franco-German summit took place in the Salle des Fêtes, at which Chancellor Helmut Kohl and President François Mitterrand agreed to form a joint military force.

An extensive programme of refurbishment works, involving the restoration of the facades and gargoyles, was undertaken between 2009 and 2012. A serious fire caused major damage to the complex on 28 June 2013. The areas most affected included the Salle des Fêtes, where the ceiling collapsed, and the municipal archives, which were damaged by the water used by the firemen. After a major programme of repairs, the building re-opened in December 2019. A new Salle du Conseil (council chamber), designed by Philippe Villeneuve, was established in the attic area previously occupied by the archives.

== Sources ==
- Béraud, Rémi (1987). Petite Encyclopédie Monumentale et Historique de La Rochelle. Édition Rupella. ISBN 978-2864740148.
- Couneau, Emile (1904). La Rochelle disparue. A. Foucher.
- Deveau, Marie-Françoise (1995). L'Hôtel de Ville de La Rochelle. Etre & connaître. ISBN 978-2911198007.
- Jourdan, Jean-Baptiste-Ernest (1861). Éphémérides historiques de la Rochelle. La Rochelle.
- Robin, Catherine; Morel, Fabienne (2002). Le patrimoine des communes de la Charente-Maritime. Vol. 2. Flohic éditions. ISBN 978-2842341299.
