= Ernest Henri Dubois =

French sculptor and medalist (1863–1930)

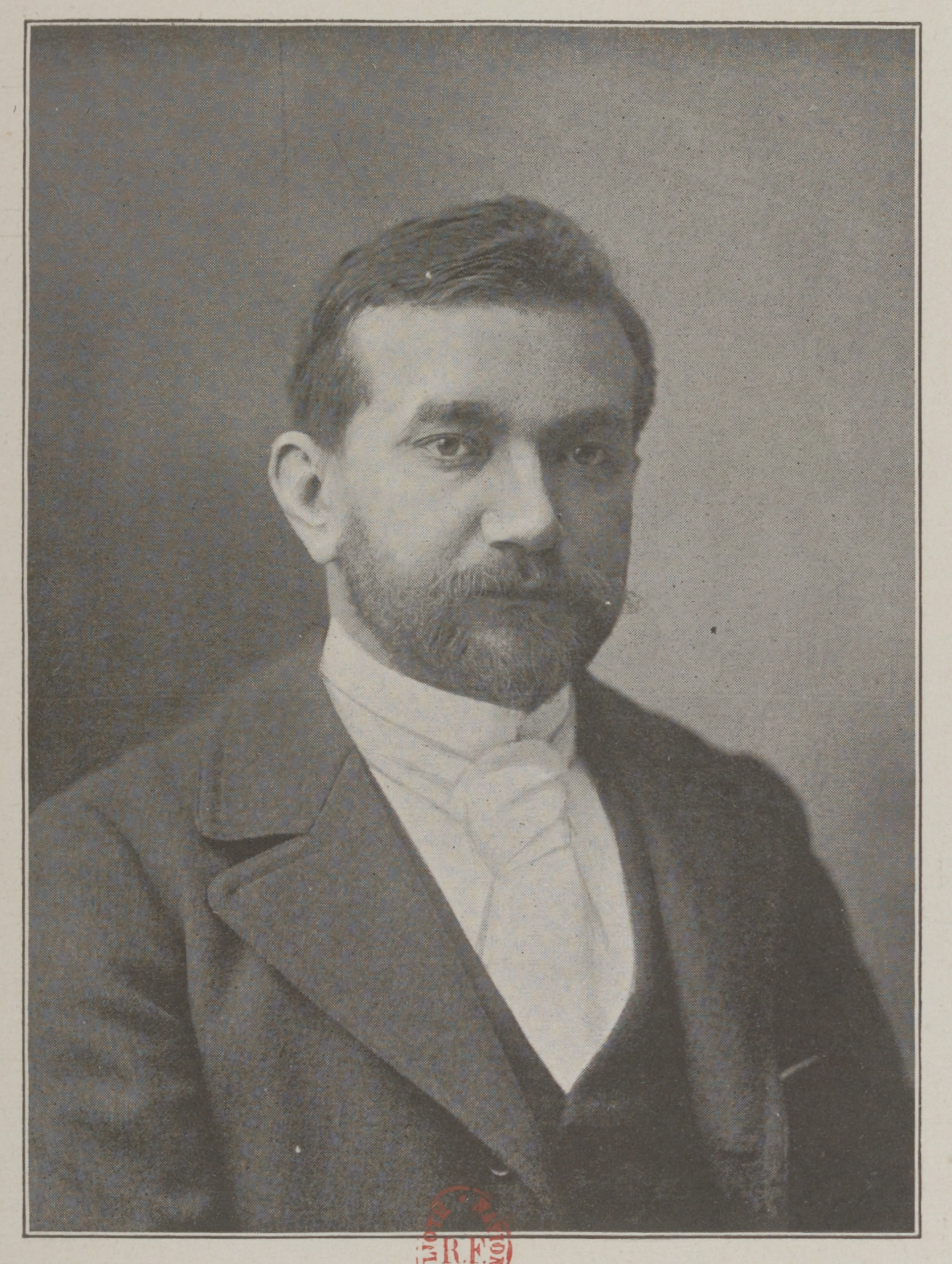
Ernest Henri Dubois c. 1900

Ernest Henri Dubois (French pronunciation: [ɛʁnɛst ɑ̃ʁi dybwa]; 16 March 1863 in Dieppe; 30 December 1930 in Paris), was a French sculptor. He enrolled in 1881 at the École des Arts décoratiif and then attended the École des Beaux-Arts in Paris where he studied under Alexandre Falguière, Henri Chapu and Jules Chaplain. It was his award of the commission to carry out the sculptural work on the tomb of Jacques-Bénigne Bossuet in Meaux Cathedral that gave his career a boost and saw him awarded a Medal of Honour and subsequently he became a Chevalier de la Légion d'honneur.

== Works ==
| Name | Date | Notes |
|---|---|---|
| The war memorial of Dieppe in Seine-Maritime | 1925 | The Dieppe memorial stands in Dieppe's Square Carnot. Not only are the hundreds of men born in Dieppe and killed in the two World Wars remembered, but also the civilians who lost their lives from 1939 to 1945 and all those deported by the Germans, often to an unknown fate. Dubois' compositions are in bronze. In the central bronze group, three French servicemen, an infantryman, a marine and an aviator are shown draping the French flag around a figure representing "Victory". This composition was shown at the Salon de la Société des Artistes Français in 1925 under the title "Les poilus fixent la Victoire dans les plis du drapeau français". Dubois' central bronze composition on the Dieppe War Memorial |
| Statue de Jules Méline at Remiremont | | A maquette of this work is held by the Musée Charles de Bruyères in Remiremont. Méline was French prime minister from 1896 to 1898. |
| Monument to Eugène Fromentin in La Rochelle | | Dubois was the sculptor of the monument dedicated to Eugène Fromentin which stands in La Rochelle's place des Petits-Bancs. Eugène Fromentin was a writer and painter who came from La Rochelle. The work is in bronze and features a bust of Fromentin being saluted by a rider on a horse. |
| Monument to Jean Guiton | 1911 | The statue stands in front of the Hôtel de Ville in La Rochelle. Guiton had been mayor of La Rochelle in the siege of 1628. A public subscription to cover the funding of the monument was organized in 1909. The American town of New Rochelle were recorded as having made a subscription. |
| Statue of Jules Hardouin-Mansart | | This bronze by Dubois stands in Les Invalides in Paris. Jules Hardouin-Mansart (1646-1708) was the Chief Architect for Louis XIV and served as "Superintendent of Royal Works". Dubois' bronze sculpture depicts Hardouin-Mansart wearing a long wig and typical 17th century coat, ruffled shirt and leggings. He is standing with one foot raised a little higher on a step and studies a drawing (one suspects an architectural drawing). |
| Le Pardon | | This work by Dubois is one of his best known works. |
| Sculptural work on the tomb of Jacques-Bénigne Bossuet in Meaux Cathedral | | St Stephen's Cathedral in Meaux contains the tomb of the so-called "Eagle of Meaux", Jacques-Bénigne Bossuet. The tomb has some elaborate sculptural work by Dubois. |
| Le Vengeur | 1908 | This complex piece in marble is located in the "Panthéon de Paris". La bataille du 13 prairial an II also known as the battle of Prairial or the third battle of Ouessant was an important naval battle between the fleets of France and Britain and took place between 28 May and 1 June 1794. |
| Monument aux Savoyards morts pour la patrie | | The bronze sculpture on this monument in the Place Monge in Chambéry is by Dubois. |
| Bust of Laurent-Honoré Marqueste the French sculptor | | A bust of Marqueste sculpted by Ernest Henri Dubois is held at the Musée des Augustins, Toulouse. |
| The monument to the Maistre brothers | 1899 | In the Chambéry musée des Beaux-arts, there is a maquette of this important work by Dubois, a statue of the brothers Joseph de Maistre and Xavier de Maistre. |
| Bust of Mathurin Guignard | | This work is held in the Bordeaux Musée des Beaux-Arts. |

Dubois also designed several public monuments erected in Romania:

- Monument to Ion C. Brătianu in Bucharest.
- Monument to George C. Cantacuzino, at Grădina Icoanei.
- Monument to George D. Pallade.
- Monument to Eugeniu Carada in Bucharest.
- Monument to Take Ionescu.
- Bust of Ion Brătianu.

Some of these monuments were destroyed during the Communist period.

== Gallery ==
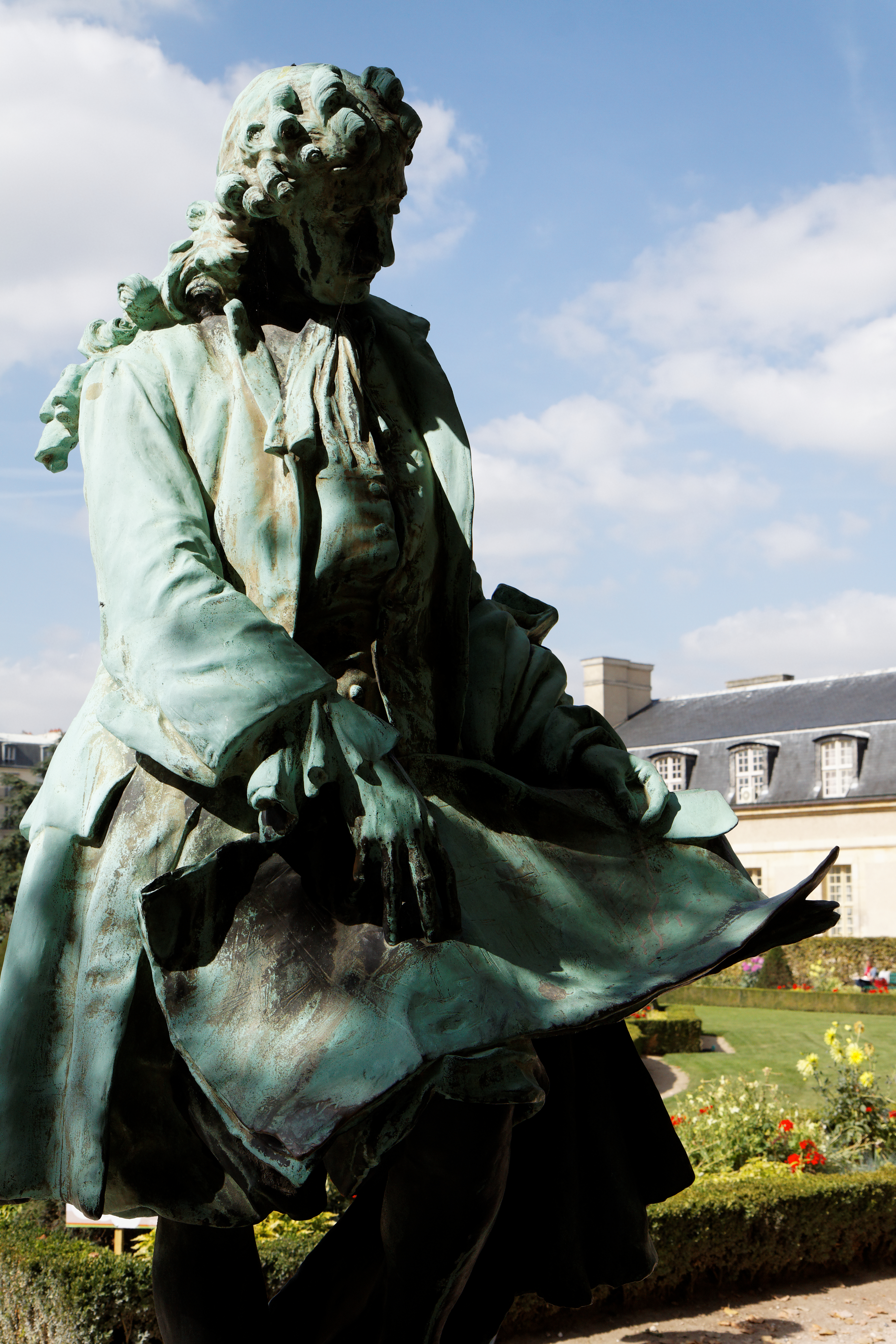
Statue of Jules Hardouin-Mansart. He studies an architectural drawing.

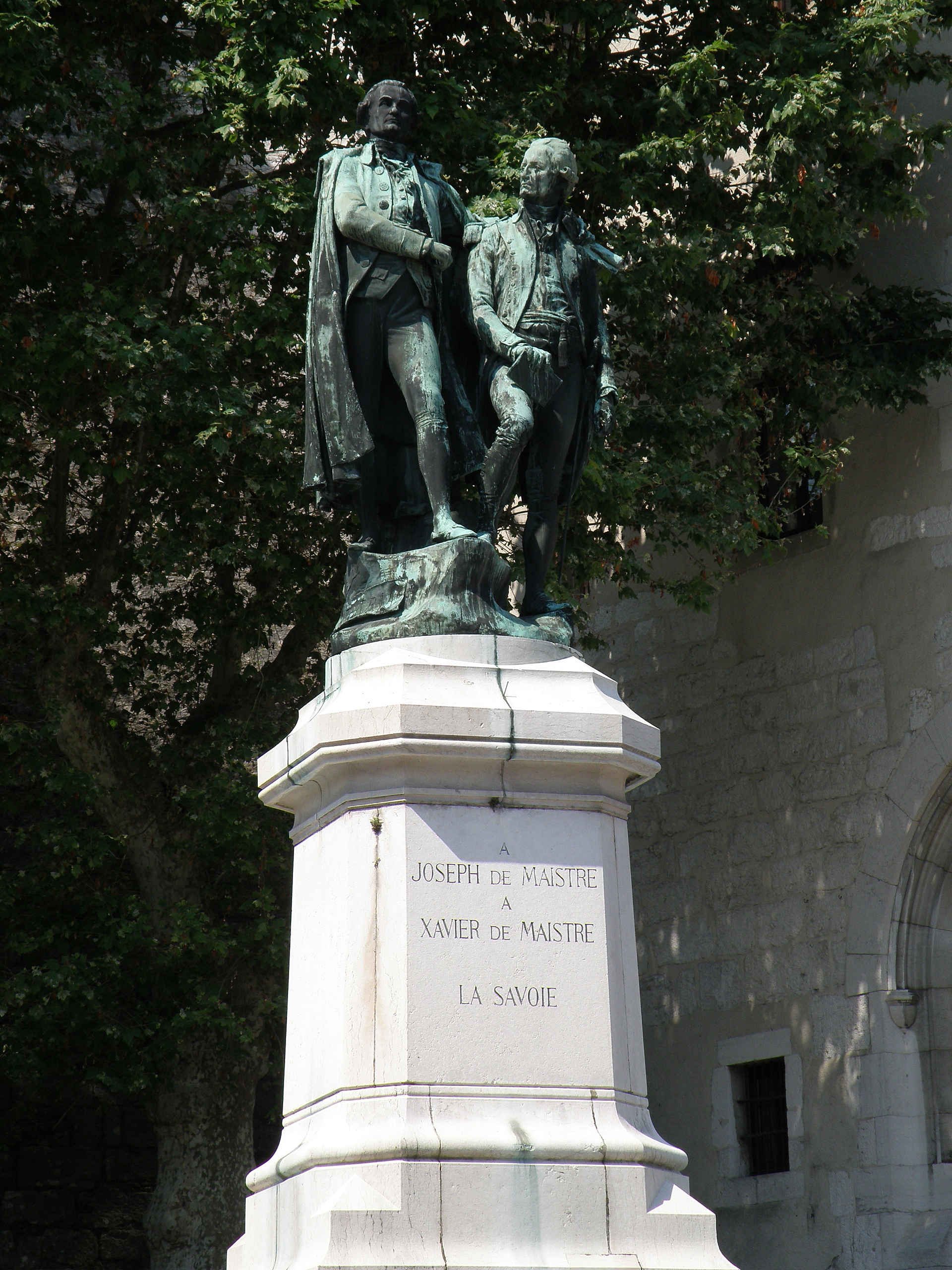
Monument to the Maistre brothers Xavier de Maistre and Joseph de Maistre in Chambéry

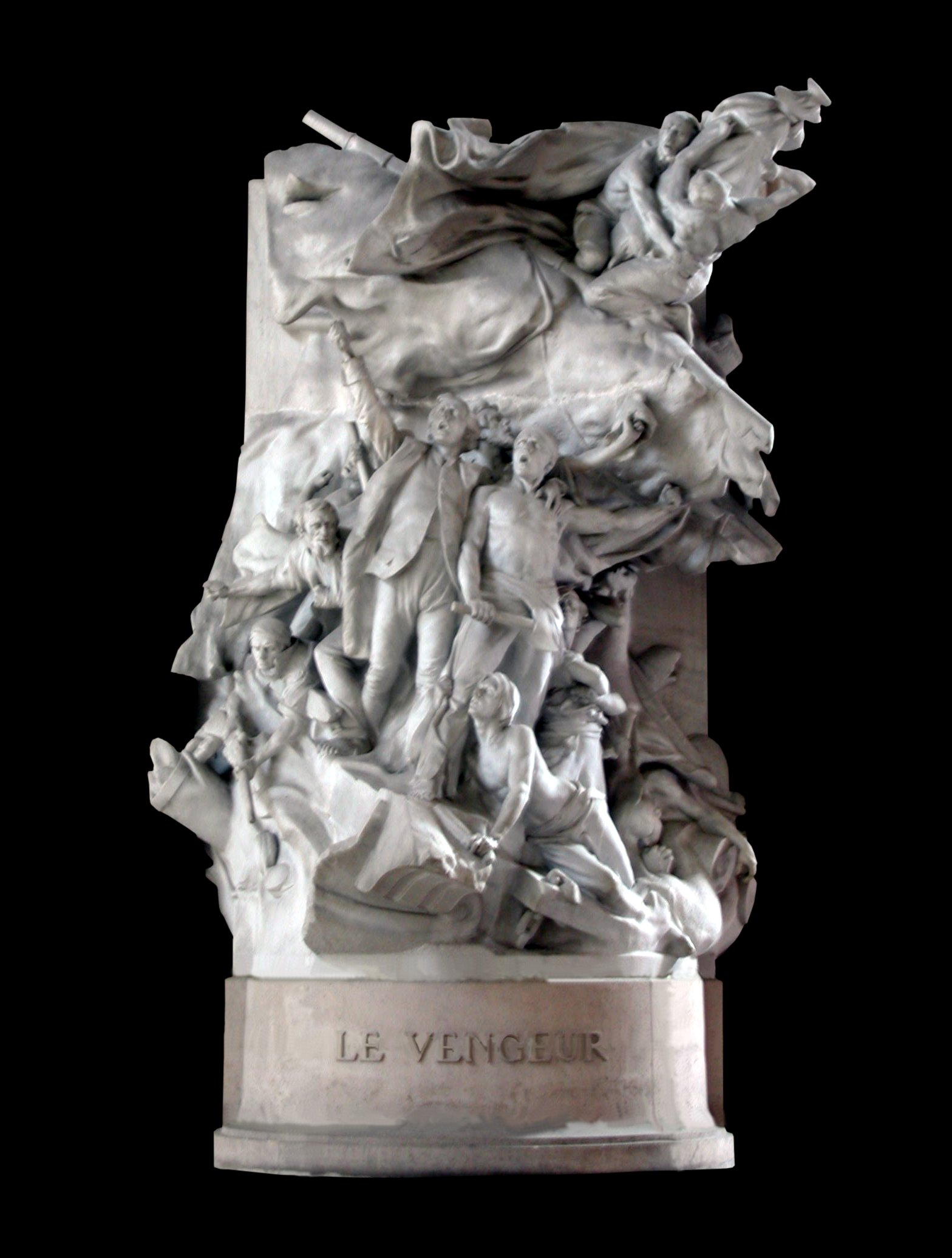
"Le Vengeur" a composition by Ernest Henri Dubois

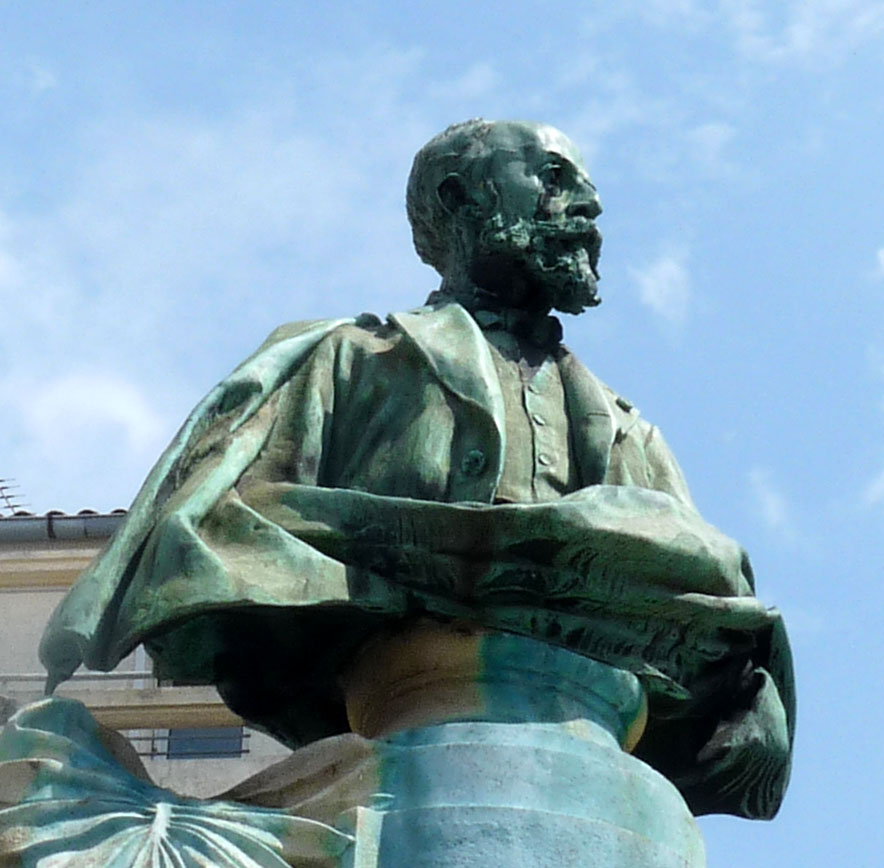
Bust of Eugène Fromentin the French painter and writer.

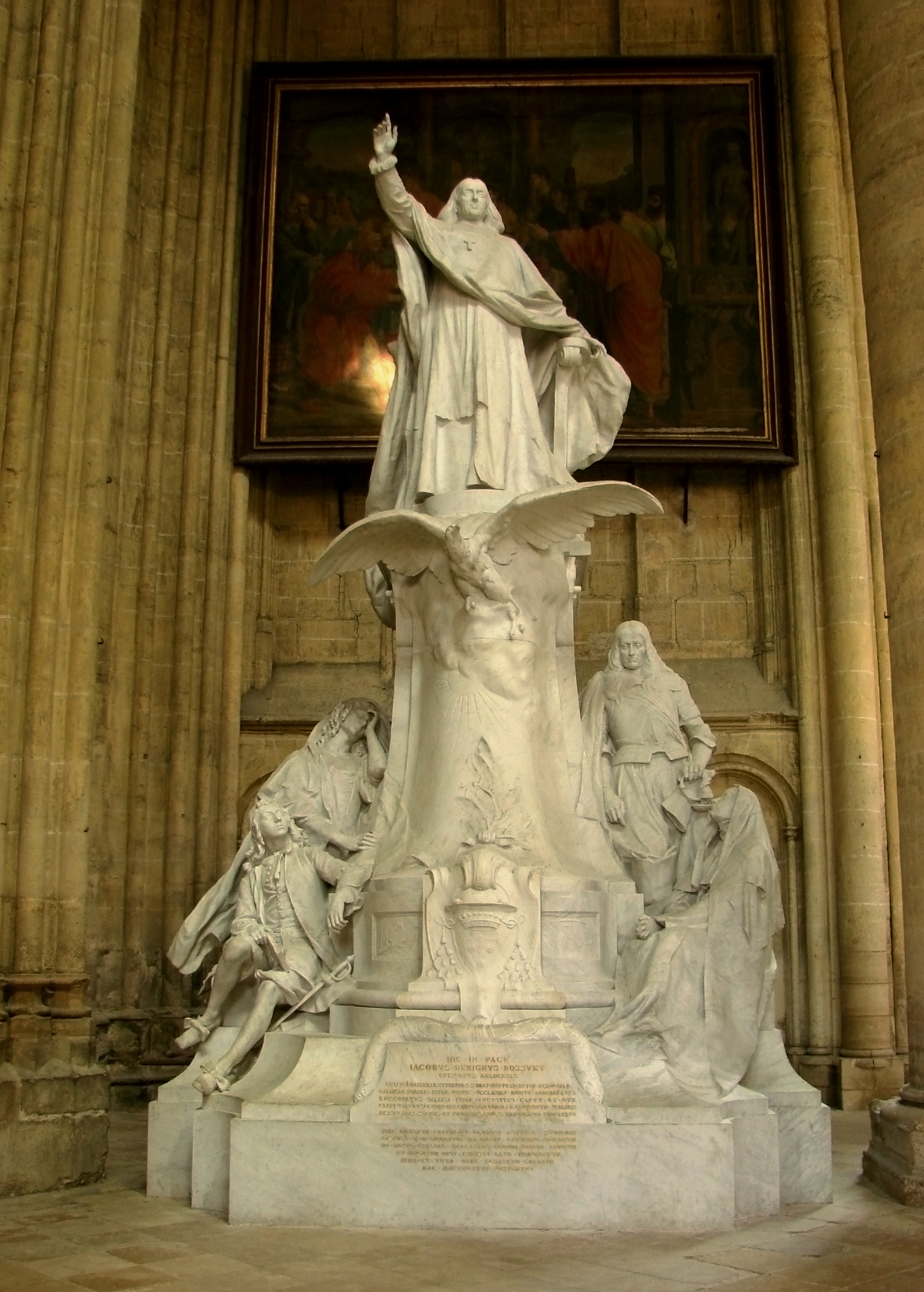
The Jacques-Bénigne Bossuet monument in Meaux Cathedral

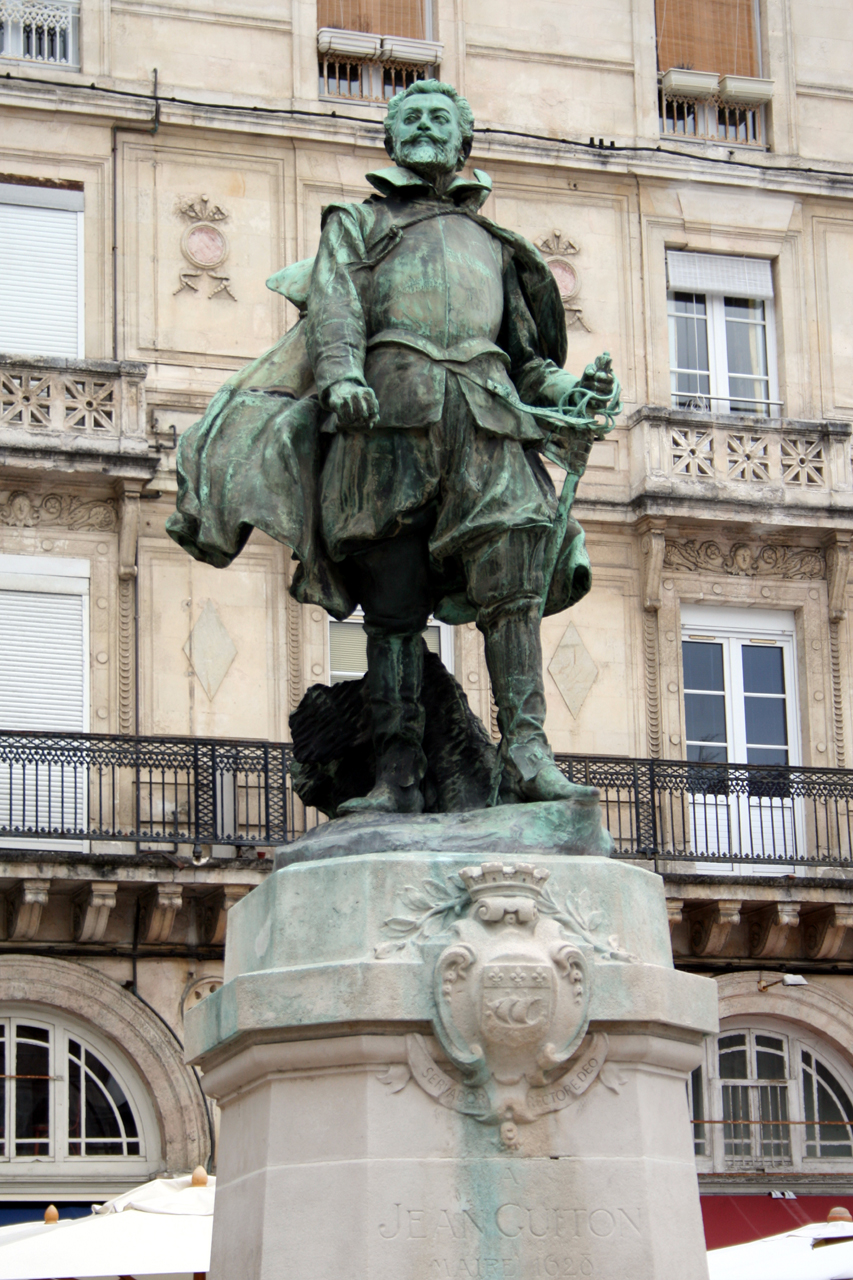
Jean Guiton by Ernest Henri Dubois

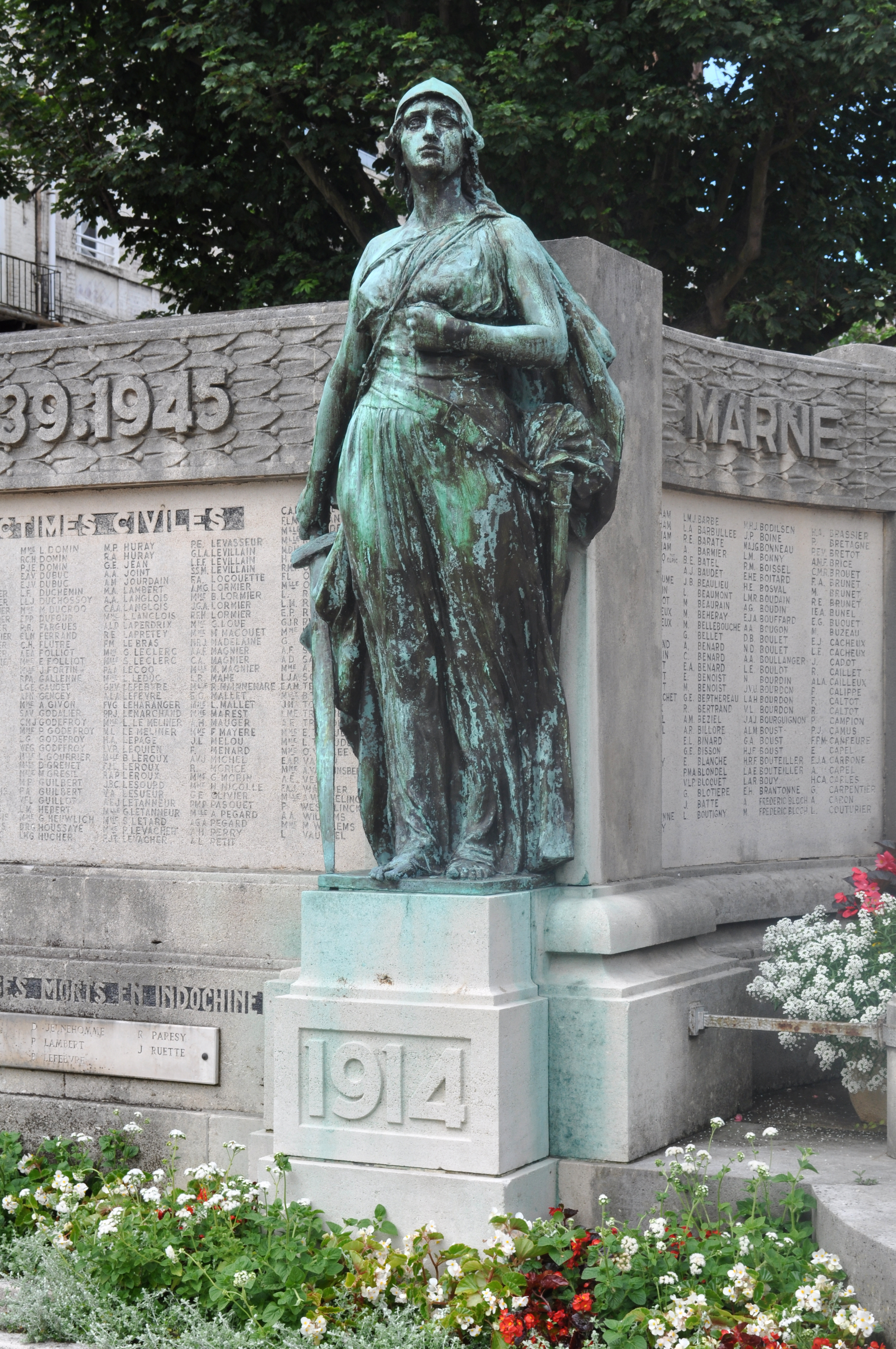
Dieppe War Memorial with one of Ernest Henri Dubois' sculptures
