= Léonce Vieljeux =

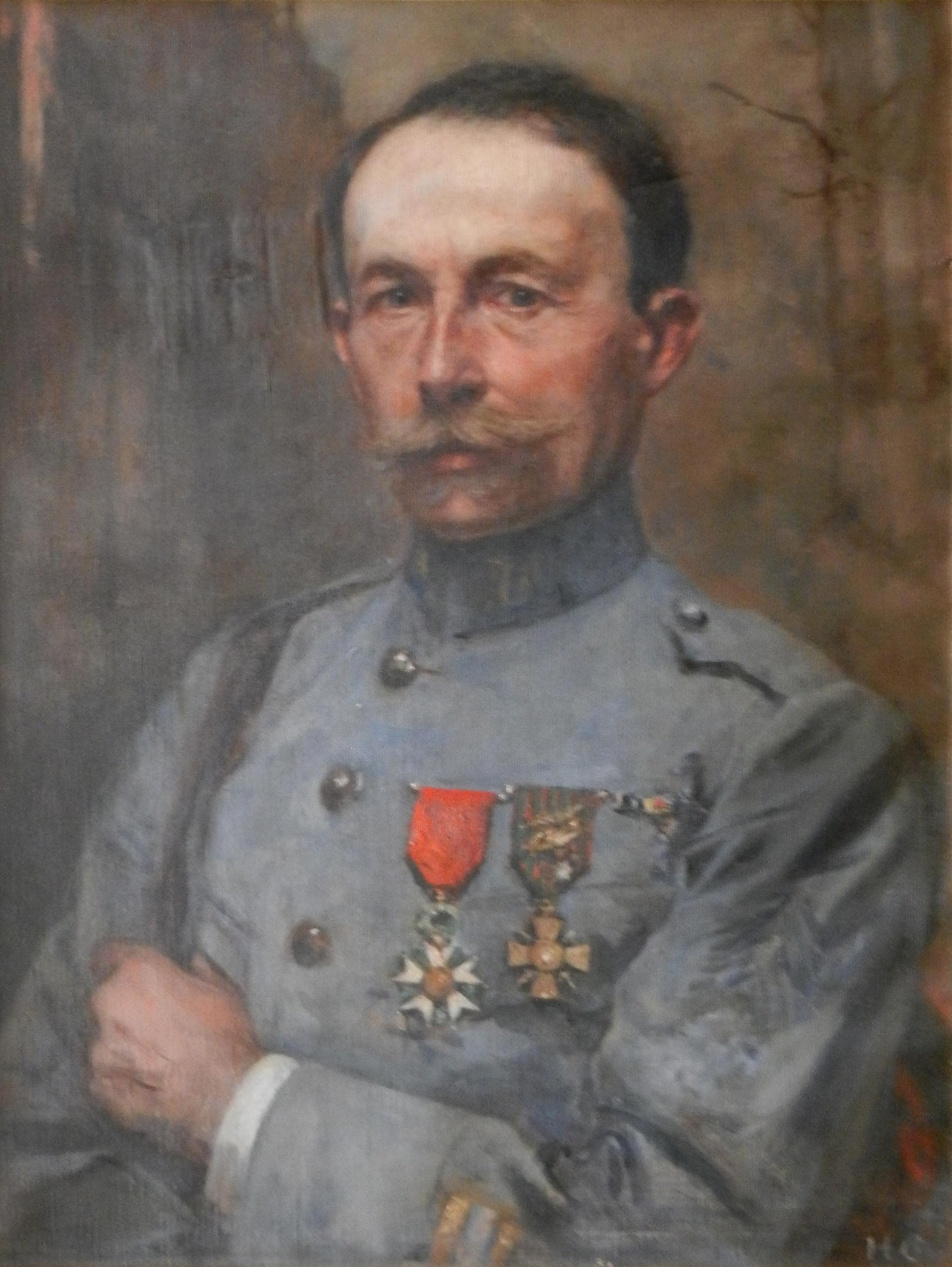
Léonce Vieljeux. Portrait

Léonce Vieljeux (12 April 1865, Les Vans, Ardèche, France – 12 September 1944, Struthof) was a colonel in the French reserve army, industrialist and mayor of La Rochelle.

== Life ==
Gaining a diploma from the École spéciale militaire de Saint-Cyr in 1888, he was attached to the 123e régiment d’infanterie at La Rochelle, where he married Hélène Delmas, daughter of the famous arms manufacturer from that town. He left the army to enter his father-in-law's family business "Delmas Frères", becoming its president, changing its name to "Compagnie Delmas-Vieljeux", and making it one of France's most important shipping companies. Sitting on La Rochelle's municipal council from 1912 to 1925, he became its mayor in 1930.

With the onset of the Second World War, Léonce Vieljeux began working to resist the town's Nazi occupiers. Thus, when on Sunday 23 June 1940 a German lieutenant presented himself to mayor Vieljeux with a request to hang a German swastika flag from La Rochelle's Hôtel de Ville, Vieljeux replied that he was a colonel (in the reserves) and had no orders to receive a junior officer, even if he was from a victorious army. This first act of resistance was followed by systematic opposition to the posting of Nazi propaganda posters. At the same time, he helped engineers and workers from his factory who belonged to the ALLIANCE Resistance network to find means of escape. On 22 September 1940, he was removed from his office of mayor and then (in 1941) expelled from the town. On 23 January 1941, he was made a member of the National Council of Vichy France.

Later returning to La Rochelle, he was arrested at the start of 1944. Interned at Lafond before being transferred to Poitiers then Fresnes, he was finally sent to the Schirmeck concentration camp near Strasburg, where he remained from 1 May to 1 September 1944. On the night of 1/2 September 1944 he was taken to the camp at Struthof, where he was shot.

His funeral service took place in the Protestant church in La Rochelle in the presence of 3,000 townspeople of all denominations and social classes. A commemorative stamp with his face on was issued on 28 March 1960.
