= Louis Léopold Ollier =

French surgeon

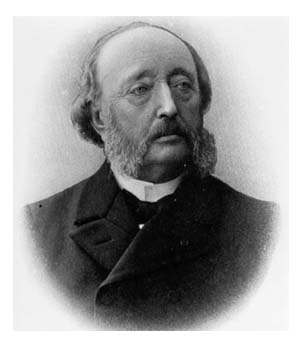
- Born: Louis Léopold Ollier; 2 December 1830; Les Vans, France
- Died: 26 November 1900 (aged 69); Lyon, France
- Education: University of Montpellier
- Medical career
- Profession: Surgeon
- Institutions: Hôtel-Dieu de Lyon
- Research: Reconstructive surgery, orthopedic surgery
- Awards: Legion of Honour (1894)

Louis Xavier Édouard Léopold Ollier (French: [ɔlje]; 2 December 1830 – 26 November 1900) was a French surgeon, known for his pioneering work in reconstructive surgery and orthopedics.

== Biography ==
Ollier was born in Les Vans, department of Ardèche. His father and grandfather were also physicians. Initially he studied natural sciences at Montpellier, and in 1851 began work as medical interne at Lyon Hospital. In 1857 he earned his medical doctorate in Paris, and in 1860 became chief-surgeon at the Hôtel-Dieu in Lyon. In 1877 he became a professor of clinical surgery. Following Ollier's death in 1900, his position at Lyon was filled by surgeon Mathieu Jaboulay (1860–1913).

Ollier is famous for his work in bone and joint surgery. He became internationally known for developing techniques involving bone-resection, and is remembered for his extensive research of regeneration of bone by the periosteum following resection. He was a pioneer in the field of bone grafting, and also devised a surgical operation known as astragalectomy.

In 1872 he developed a split-thickness skin graft that was later improved upon by Karl Thiersch (Ollier–Thiersch graft). His name is also associated with Ollier's disease, a bone disorder that is also known as multiple enchondromatosis. Furthermore, the cambium layer (inner layer of the periosteum) is sometimes referred to as "Ollier's layer". This is the layer of tissue where osteoblasts reside.

On 24 June 1894 Ollier was awarded commander of the Légion d'Honneur by French president Marie-François-Sadi Carnot. Ironically, later that evening Carnot was stabbed by an assassin, and Ollier was summoned to tend to the dying president's wounds. Today, the museum of pathological anatomy at the University of Lyon is named in Ollier's honor.

== Selected writings ==
- "Des moyens chirurgicaux de favoriser la reproduction des os après les résections, etc.", in: Gazette hebdomadaire de médecine et de chirurgie, 1858 (Ollier's layer described).
- Traité expérimental et clinique de la régénération des os et de la production artificielle du tissu osseux, two volumes (Paris: Victor Masson, 1867).
- "Greffes cutanées ou autoplastiques", in: Bulletin de l'Académie de Médecine (Paris, 1872) (Ollier–Thiersh graft described).
- Traité des résections et des opérations conservatrices qu'on peut pratiquer sur le système nerveux (Paris, 1885–1898).
- "Exostoses multiples", in: Mémoires et comptes rendus de la Société des sciences médicales de Lyon (1889) (1890); (Ollier's disease described).

== Sources ==
- "Louis Xavier Édouard Léopold Ollier". Who Named It. Archived from the original on November 9, 2002.
- Louis Léopold Ollier "The Father of Bone and Joint and of Reconstructive Surgery"
