= Montricoux =

- Commune
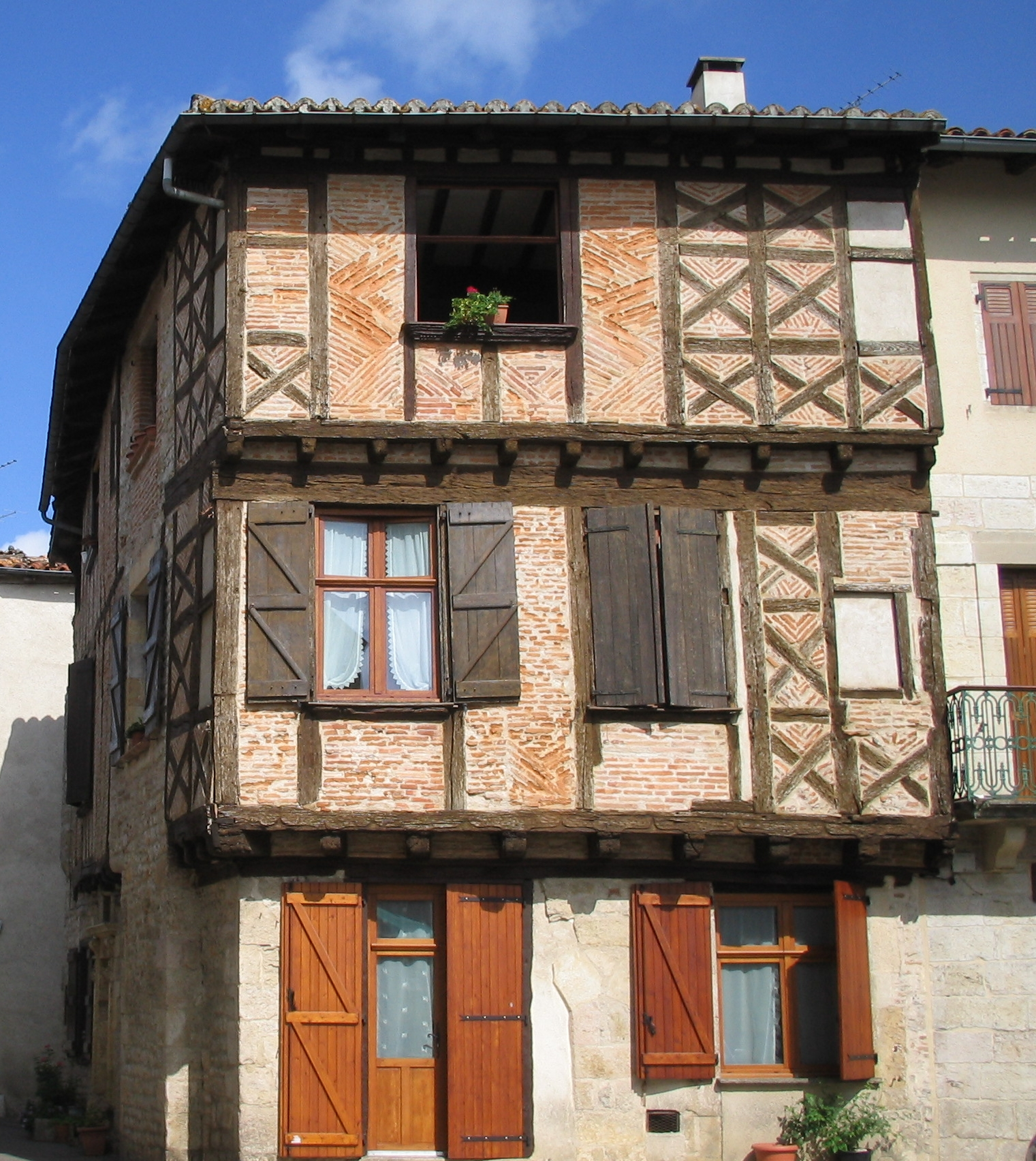
- A half-timbered house in Montricoux

- Coat of arms
- Location of Montricoux
- Location within France Location within Occitanie
- Coordinates: 44°04′36″N 1°37′13″E
- Country: France
- Region: Occitania
- Department: Tarn-et-Garonne
- Arrondissement: Montauban
- Canton: Aveyron-Lère

Government
  - Mayor (2020–2026): Fabienne Pern Savignac
- Area^{1}: 26.44 km^{2} (10.21 sq mi)
- Elevation: 133 m (436 ft)
- Highest elevation: 275 m (902 ft)
- Lowest elevation: 90 m (300 ft)
- Population (2023): 1,172
  - Density: 44.33/km^{2} (114.8/sq mi)
- Time zone: UTC+01:00 (CET)
  - Summer (DST): UTC+02:00 (CEST)
- INSEE/Postal code: 82132 /82800
- ^{1} French Land Register data, which excludes lakes, ponds, glaciers > 1 km^{2} (0.386 sq mi or 247 acres) and river estuaries.

Montricoux (French pronunciation: [mɔ̃ʁiku]; Occitan: Montricós) is a commune in the Tarn-et-Garonne department in the Occitanie region in southern France. It is located along the banks of the Aveyron, between Nègrepelisse and Bruniquel. The written history of the commune dates back to the eighth century. The Château de Montricoux, built by the Knights Templar, now houses the Marcel-Lenoir Museum, which preserves 130 drawings, pastels, watercolors, oils, and frescoes by this artist, a resident of the town.

== Geography ==
On the right bank of the Aveyron, Montricoux, with an area of 2644 hectares, lies in lower Quercy where the river leaves the limestone gorges of the Massif Central for the plain. Thus its nickname, “Portes des Gorges de l’Aveyron”, (Gates of the Aveyron Gorges).

== Etymology ==
The first known name of Montricoux was “Mormacus” then “Mons-Riculfi“ which in langue d’Oc became “Mont-Ricolf” and later “Mont-Ricos”, which means “rough, harsh mountain.”

== History ==
The nearby site archaeological site of Fontalès in Saint Antonin dates to the end of the Upper Paleolithic (Magdalenian). Flints from northwestern France and the ]Périgord have been found in Montricoux and a number of other sites in the Aveyron valley, providing evidence for the travel of ancient nomads through the region.

Stone axes have been found in nearby St Laurent, and these and the cave dwellings, flints, dolmens and a tumulus known as the Tombeau du Géant (Giant's Tomb) in the nearby forest of Bretou indicate a human presence since very early times. An Iron Age tumulus has been discovered in a Montricoux locality named "Quartou” and a line of dolmens, possibly Bronze Age, stretches from Montricoux to Puylaroque.

Several Roman roads passed through the municipality:

- to l’Albenque
- from Albi to Cahors via Montricoux
- from Cos to Cordes through Réalville, Bioule, Montricoux, Bruniquel, and Monceré

The town was known as Mormacus in this period, and archaeologists have found Roman coins there stamped with this name.

It was still known as Mormac in 767 when King Pepin the Short, honoring a vow made before his victory over Waiofar the Duke of Aquitaine, donated the land and the monastery of Saint Antonin to the monks who lived there.

The 13th-century keep of the Chateau de Montricoux dominates the cityscape of Montricoux. The Vaour commandery of the Knights Templar built it on land they had obtained in 1181 in a land swap with the monks of Saint Antonin. Article 13 of the city charter of 6 January 1277 forbade the townspeople from fishing in their pond, which has since disappeared as the river receded.

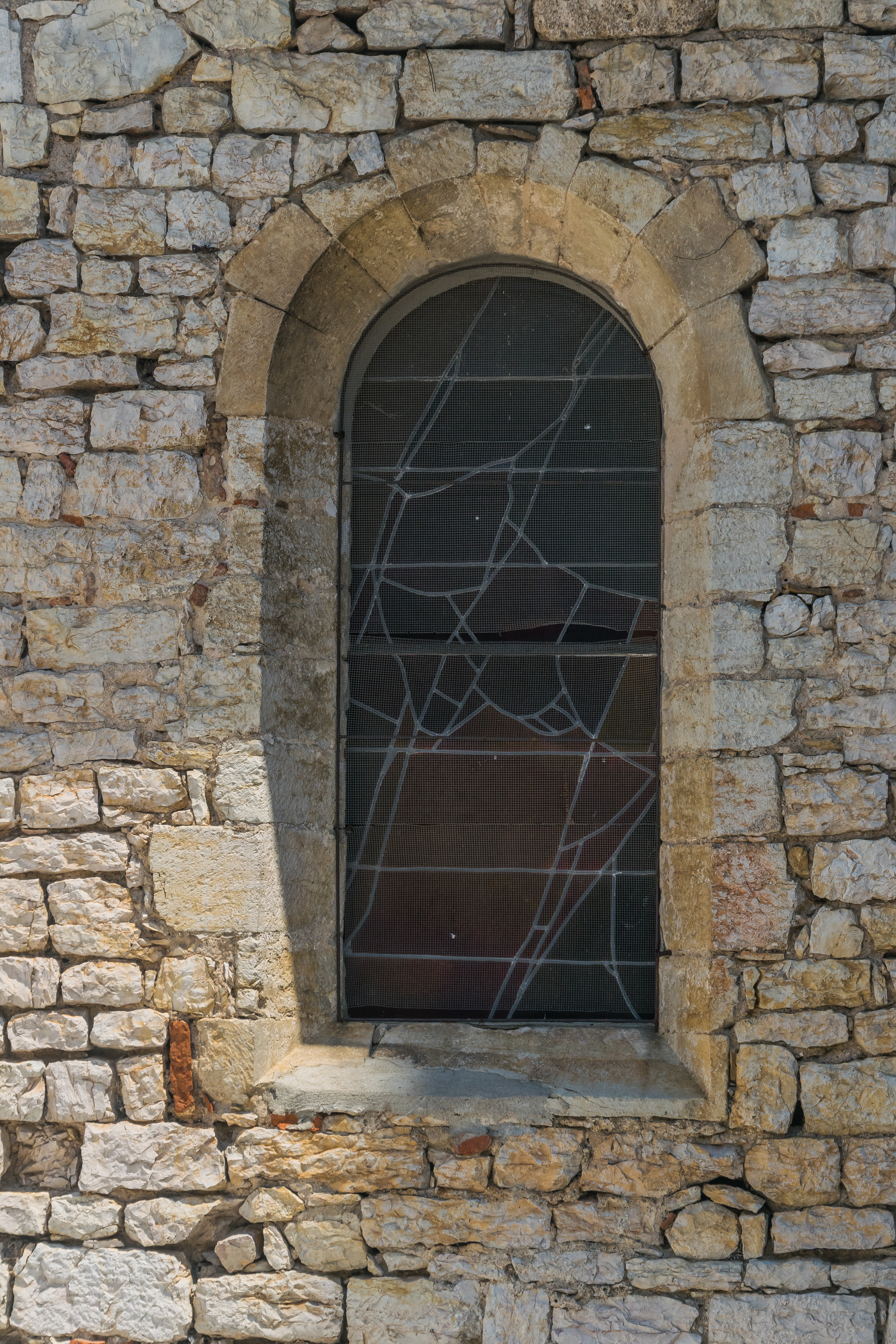
Castle window

Philip IV of France ordered the mass arrest of the Knights Templar in 1307. He gave their castle in Montricoux to his squire, Esquieu de Floyran, who had denounced the Templars as heretics. De Florian lost the château in 1322 to the Hospitaliers. On 22 March 1312 Clement V’s Papal bull Vox in excelso abolished the Templars. The May 1312 bull Ad Providam allocated all Templar assets to the Knights Hospitaller.

Unlike many neighboring towns, Montricoux remained Catholic during the French Wars of Religion. Nearby Montauban in particular had a long history of religious dissidence. The first Calvinist attack in 1561 did little damage to Montricoux, but later attacks destroyed part of the town and almost all of the château burned down, except for the keep. The de Malartic family rebuilt the château in the early 18th century.

Louis XIII visited Montricoux in 1626 during the sieges of St Antonin and Nègrepelisse Louis had taken St Antonin in 1622, and demolished its walls and much of the city. It avoided a massacre such as Nègrepelisse had suffered only by paying a hefty ransom. Before that he had laid siege to nearby Montauban from August to November 1621 but had had to abandon that effort when many of his men fell ill.

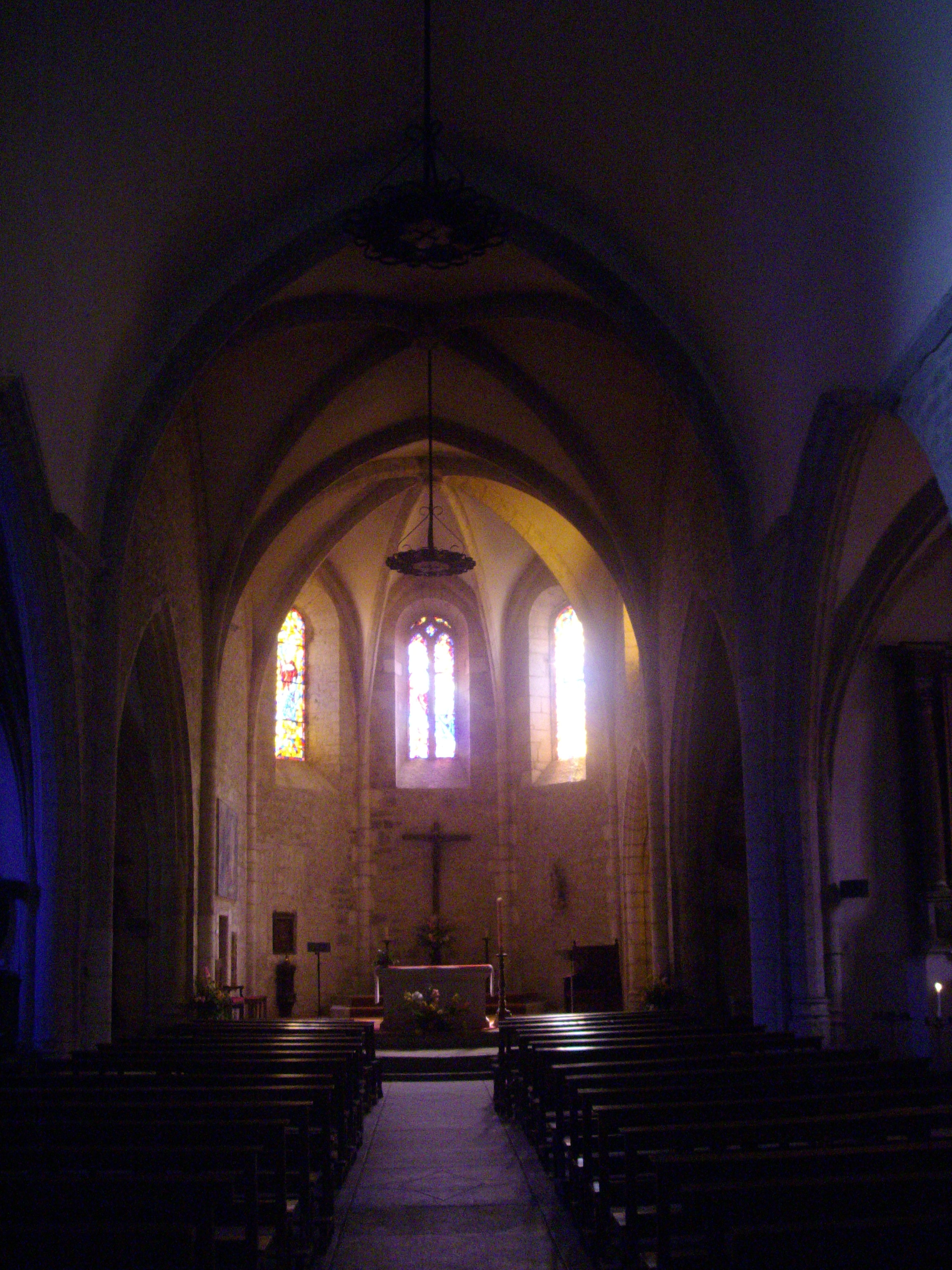
Saint-Pierre

The church of Saint Pierre until 1790 belonged to the Order of Saint-Jean-de-Jérusalem. The entrance porch, built in the same style as the 13th century abbey of Beaulieu, is the oldest part of the church.

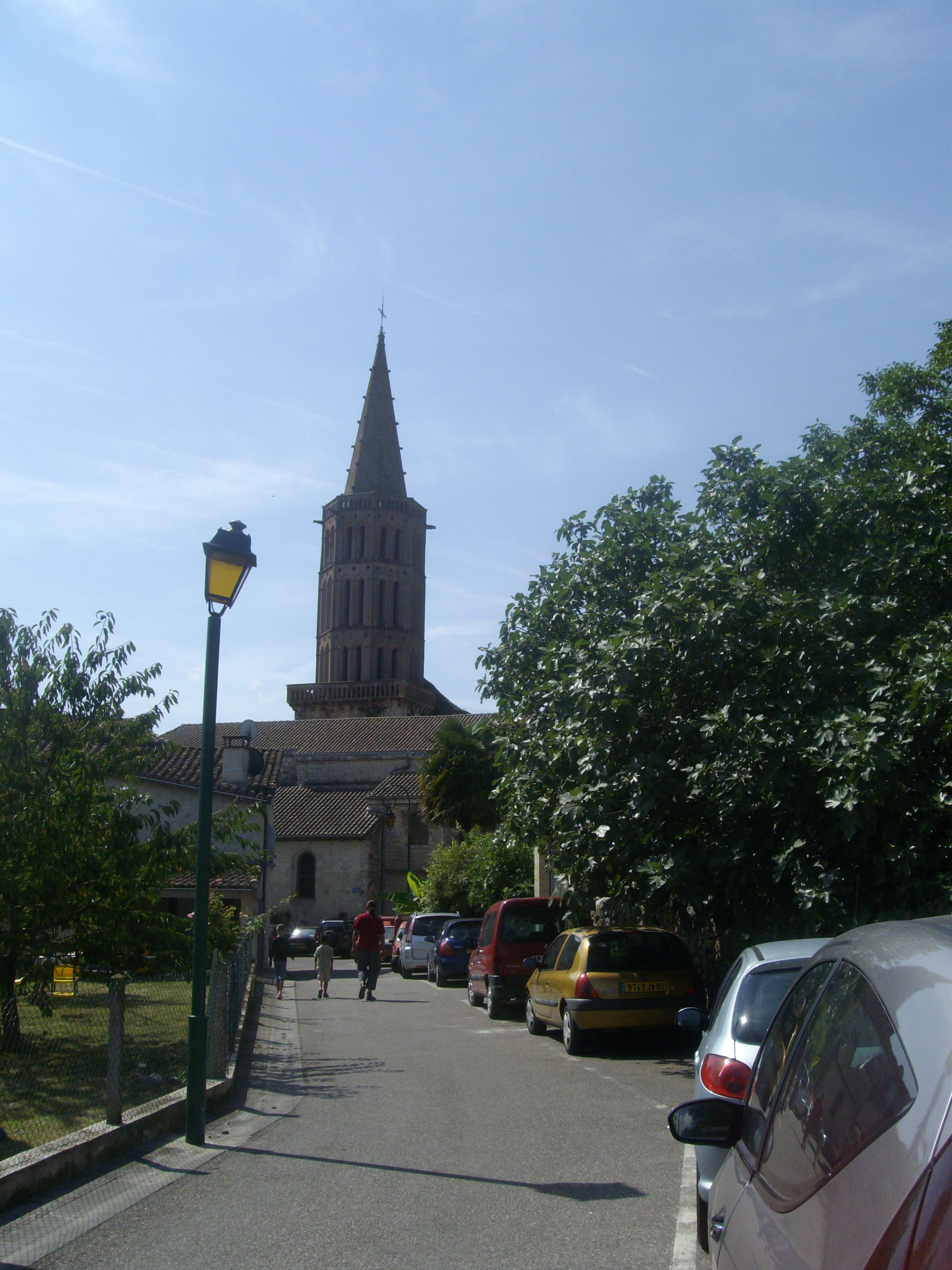
Steeple

The steeple dates from 1549. Like those at Nègrepelisse, Caussade, and the Basilica of Saint Sernin, it is of "Toulouse style", an octagonal brick tower with miter windows on a square stone socle, flanked by a turret. Gargoyles on each corner serve as downspouts.

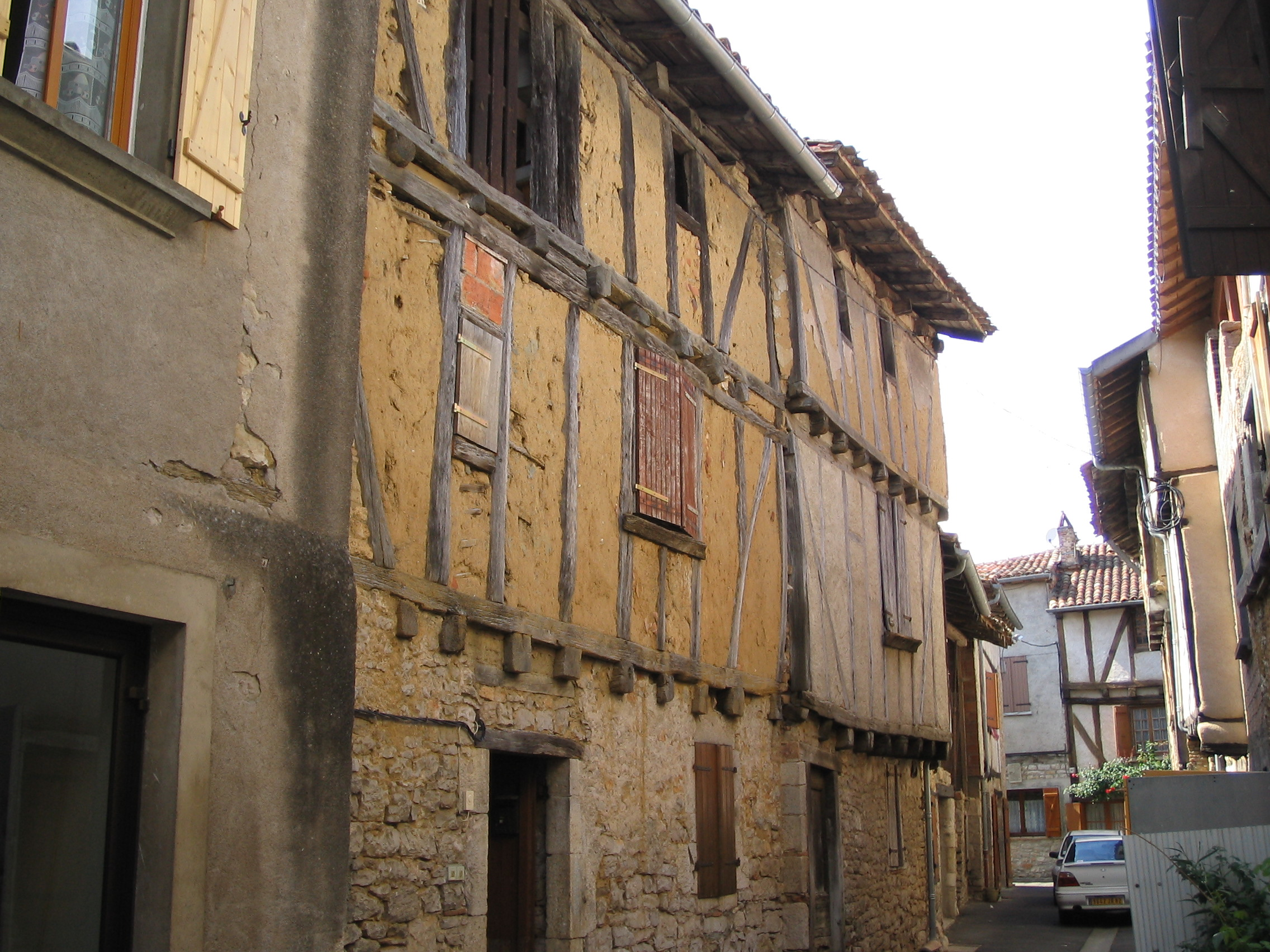
Timbered houses

Today the streets of Montricoux offer many fine examples of timber framing, many of them dating from a period of rebuilding after the Hundred Years’ War.

Members of the maquis, the decentralized French Resistance movement in World War II, were captured in Montricoux and hanged on 23 July 1944 by German soldiers. The Germans had intended to leave the bodies on display but yielded to the protestations of a local pharmacist.

=== Historic sites and monuments ===
- The church of Saint-Pierre de Montricoux

The interior has a fresco of the Annunciation by Marcel-Lenoir (1923).

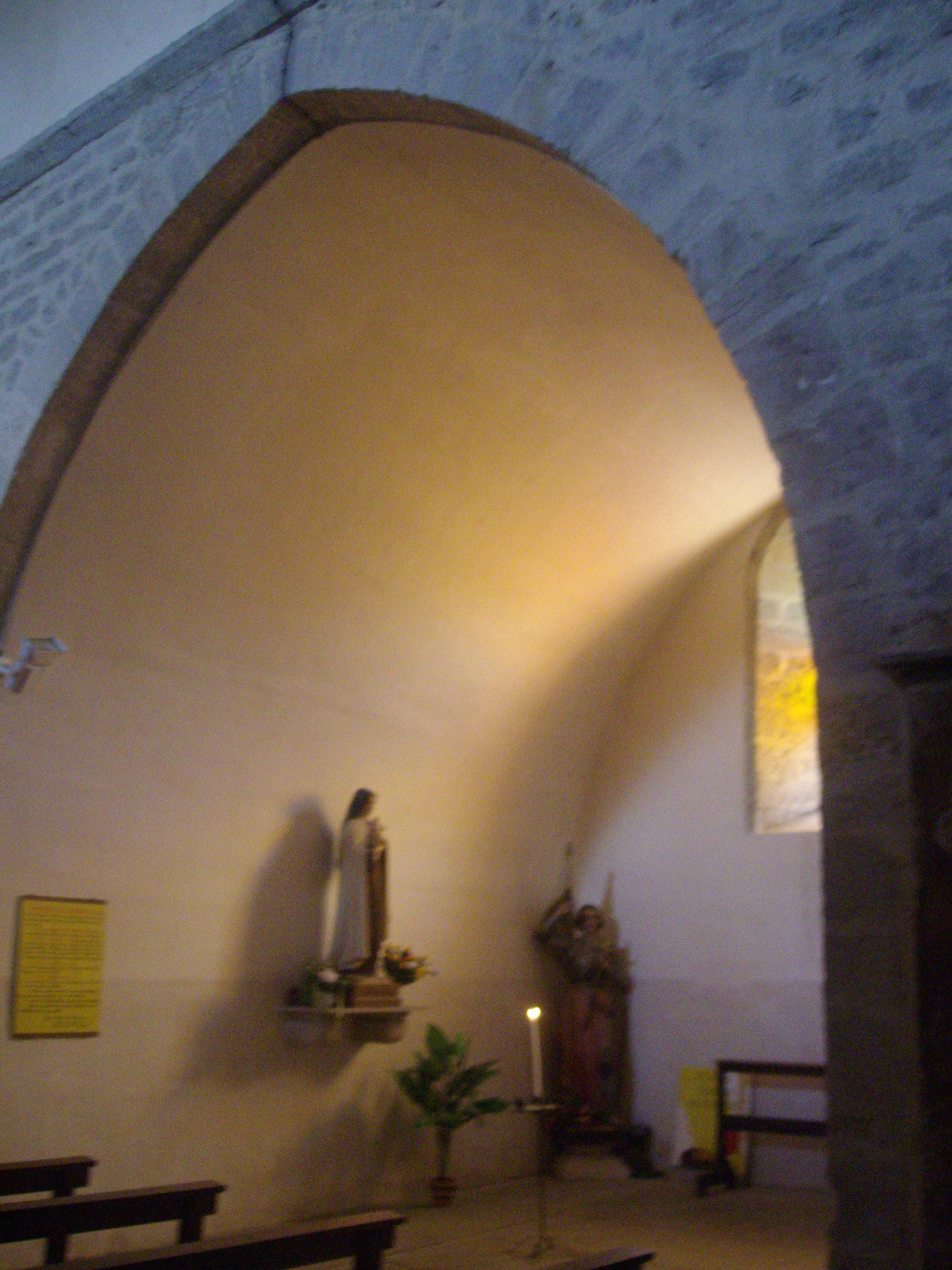
Saint-Pierre

The nave and the lower part of the steeple date from the 12th-13th centuries. The steeple and entrance were registered in 1914 as monuments historiques. Several objects in the church, such as the baptismal font, are registered in the base Palissy.

- Église Saint-Laurent (Saint Lawrence) of Saint-Laurent-Nord, a former possession of the priory of Saint-Antonin-Noble-Val, then of the Knights Templar. The building is referenced in the base Mérimée and in the Inventaire général Région Occitanie (General Inventory of the Occitanie Region).
- Château de Montricoux, former commandery of the Knights Templar; only the keep remains of the original building, damaged during the French Revolution.

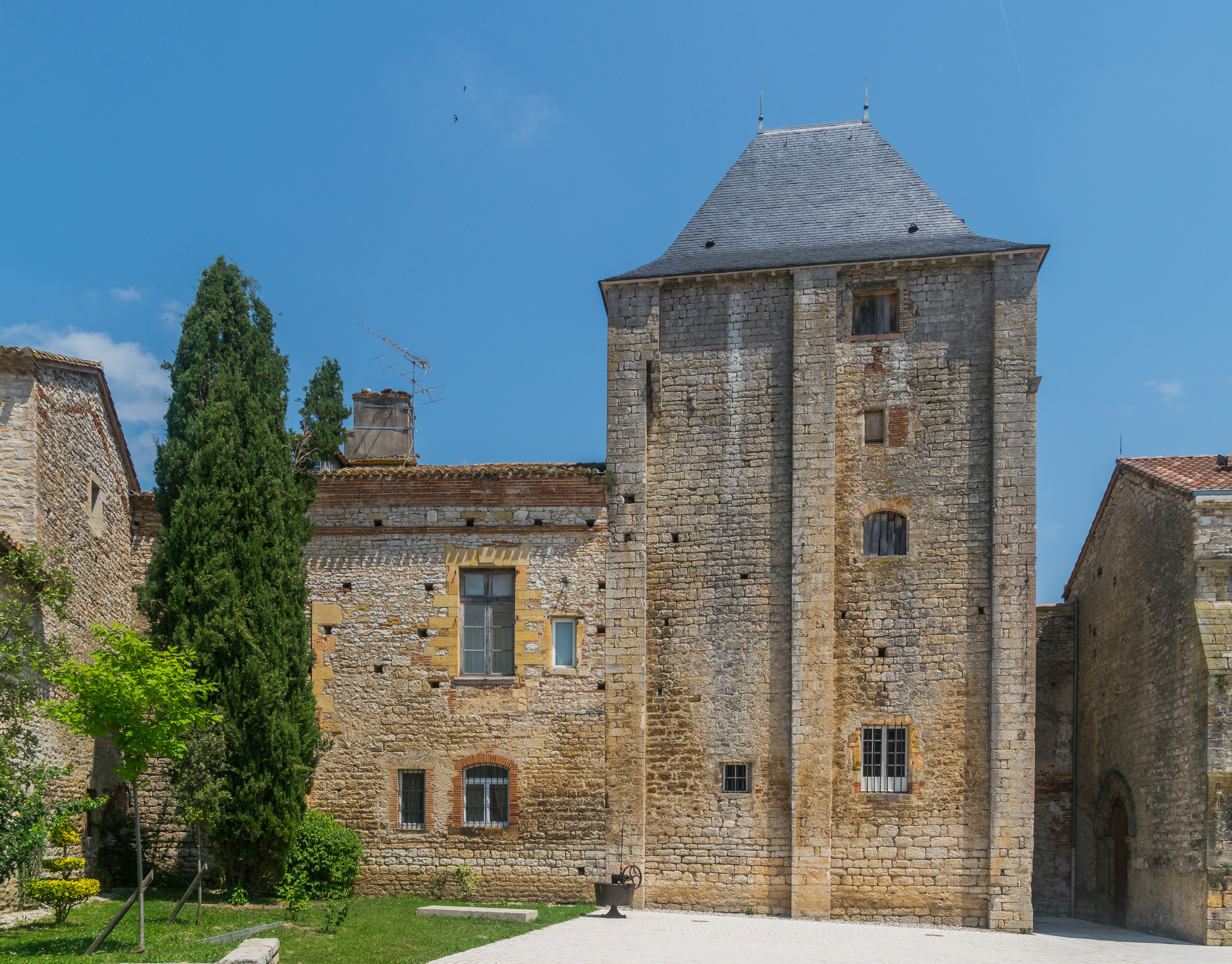
Templar keep

Deeded to the Templars 14 May 1181.
Taken, pillaged and burned by Calvinists in 1568. Keep separately registered as a monument historique 7 November 1927.

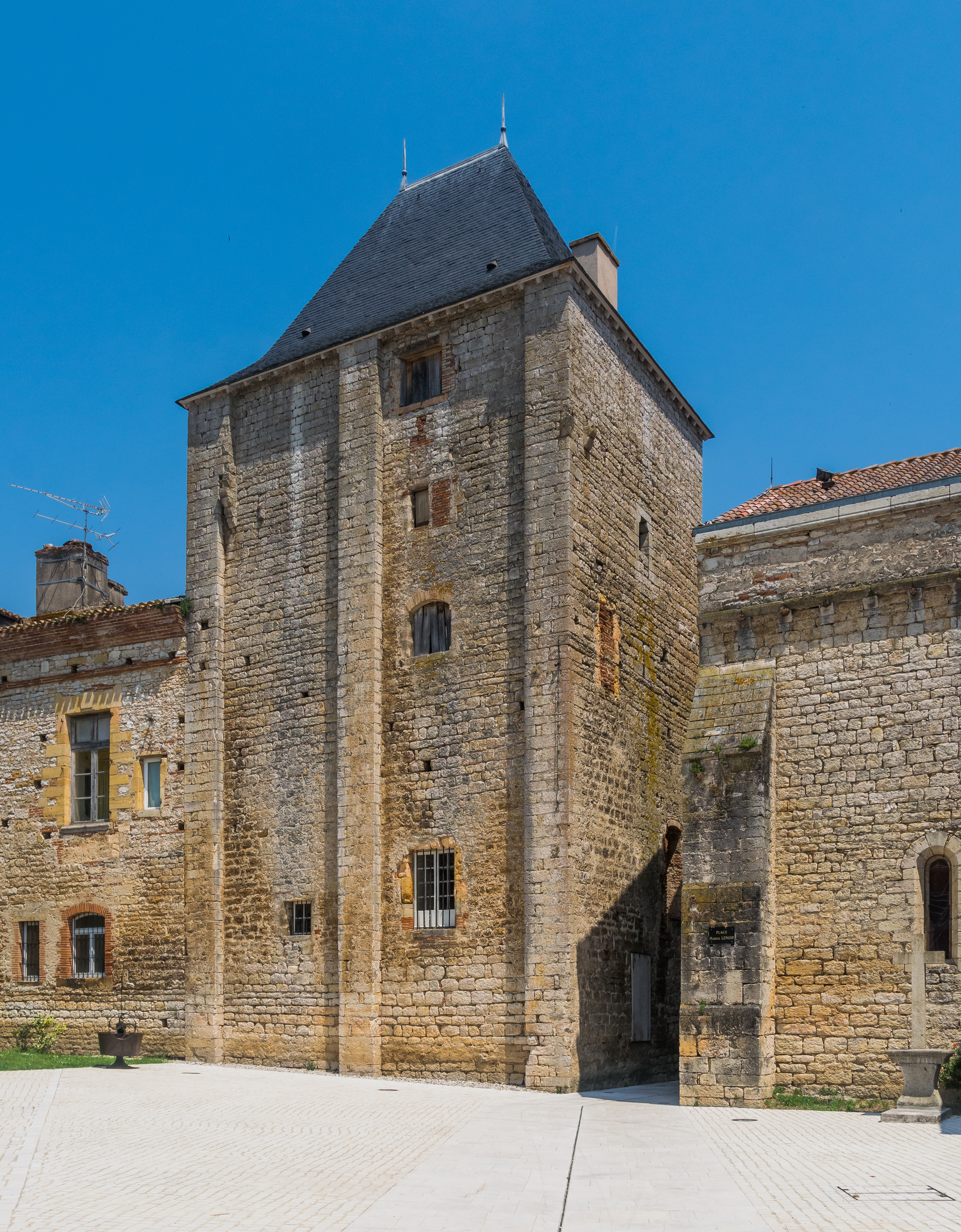
Chateau

- Place Marcel-Lenoir
- public wash-basin in Saint-Laurent.
- Church of Saint-Benoît de Castres (ruin) (Note: 44.1229°N 1.6473°E), which also belonged to the priory of Saint-Antonin then to the Templars.
- The old city walls. Traces of the ramparts remain, flanked by three semi-circular towers. Another tower behind the church was destroyed. Three gates topped by turrets also once gave entry to the town: a low gate to the west, the high gate to the east, and the Saint-Antoine gate facing the river.

== See also ==
- Communes of the Tarn-et-Garonne department
- History of the Knights Templar

== Bibliography ==
Société archéologique de Tarn-et-Garonne (1872). "Répertoire archaeologique du département de Tarn-et-Garonne" [Archaeological Inventory of the Département of Tarn-et-Garonne]. Bulletin archéologique et historique de la Société archéologique de Tarn-et-Garonne. 2–3. Société archéologique de Tarn-et-Garonne: 306 – via University of California, Google Books.
