= Jules Bourdais =

French architect (1835–1915)

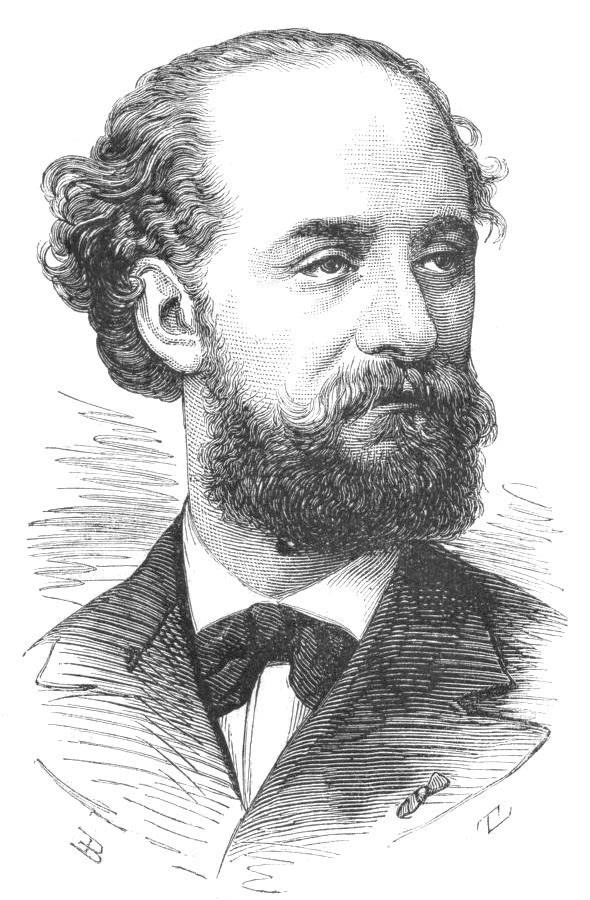
- Born: 6 April 1835; Brest, France
- Died: 2 June 1915 (aged 80); Paris
- Education: École Centrale Paris
- Occupation: Architect
- Awards: Legion of Honour
- Buildings: Trocadéro Palace

Jules Désiré Bourdais (6 April 1835 – 2 June 1915) was a French architect.

Bourdais is best known for designing the Trocadéro Palace with Gabriel Davioud and for creating a design for a 370 metres (1,210 ft) stone column for the 1889 World's Fair, the Colonne Soleil (Sun Column), which would have rivaled the Eiffel Tower.

== Biography ==
Jules Désiré Bourdais was born on April 6, 1835, in Brest, France, to Jean Julien Bourdais, a ship's captain and officer of the Legion of Honour, and Fanny Marie Louise Valéri. Bourdais graduated from the École Centrale Paris in 1857. He married Blanche Marie Juliette Fauvelet de Charbonnière in 1867.

Between 1868 and 1870, Bourdais designed the Saint-Pierre-ès-Liens church and the Protestant church in Nègrepelisse. During the Franco-Prussian War in 1870, Bourdais served as a lieutenant in the engineering corps. Between 1876 and 1878, Bourdais and Gabriel Davioud designed the town hall for the 19th arrondissement of Paris and in May 1876, Bourdais and Davioud won a competition to design the Trocadéro Palace.

In 1881, Bourdais created a design for a "sun column" – a 370 metres (1,210 ft) granite tower topped with a beacon that would be capable of illuminating all of Paris as far as Neuilly-sur-Seine, Levallois-Perret, and the Bois de Boulogne. In 1886, with the support of engineer Amédée Sébillot, Bourdais submitted his design proposal to a competition for the 1889 World's Fair, but lost to Gustave Eiffel's proposal for the Eiffel Tower.

Bourdais died at his residence in the 16th arrondissement of Paris on June 2, 1915, and was buried in the Montmartre Cemetery.

== Gallery ==
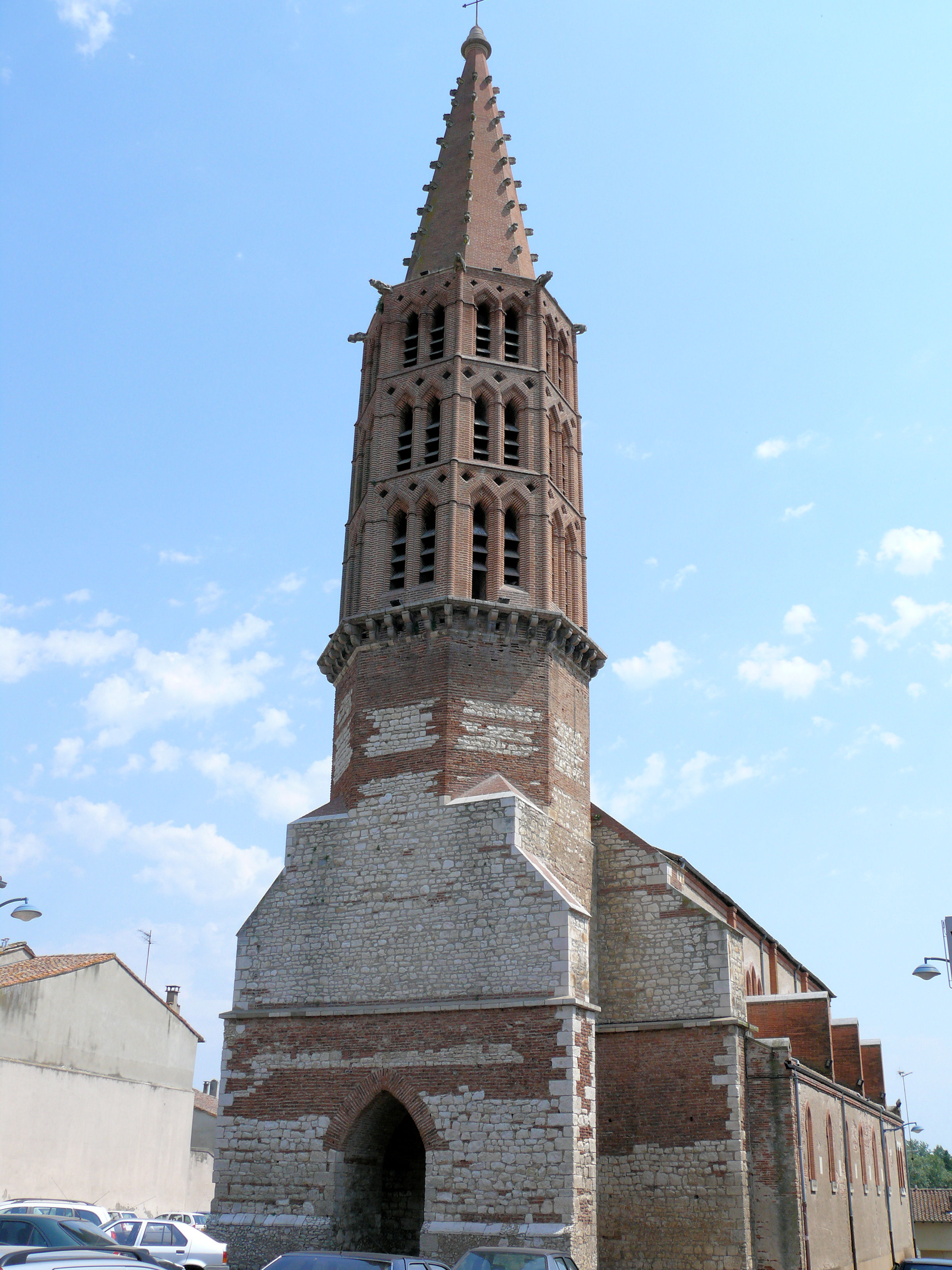
Saint-Pierre-ès-Liens church, Nègrepelisse

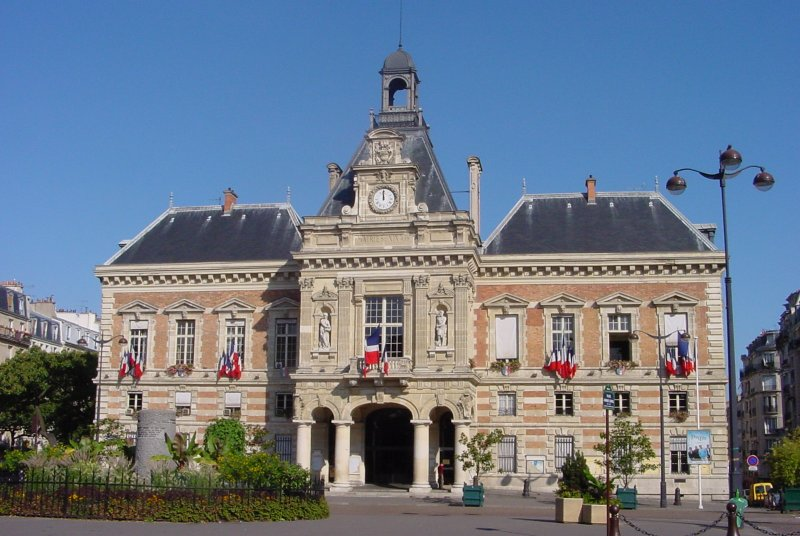
Town hall for the 19th arrondissement of Paris

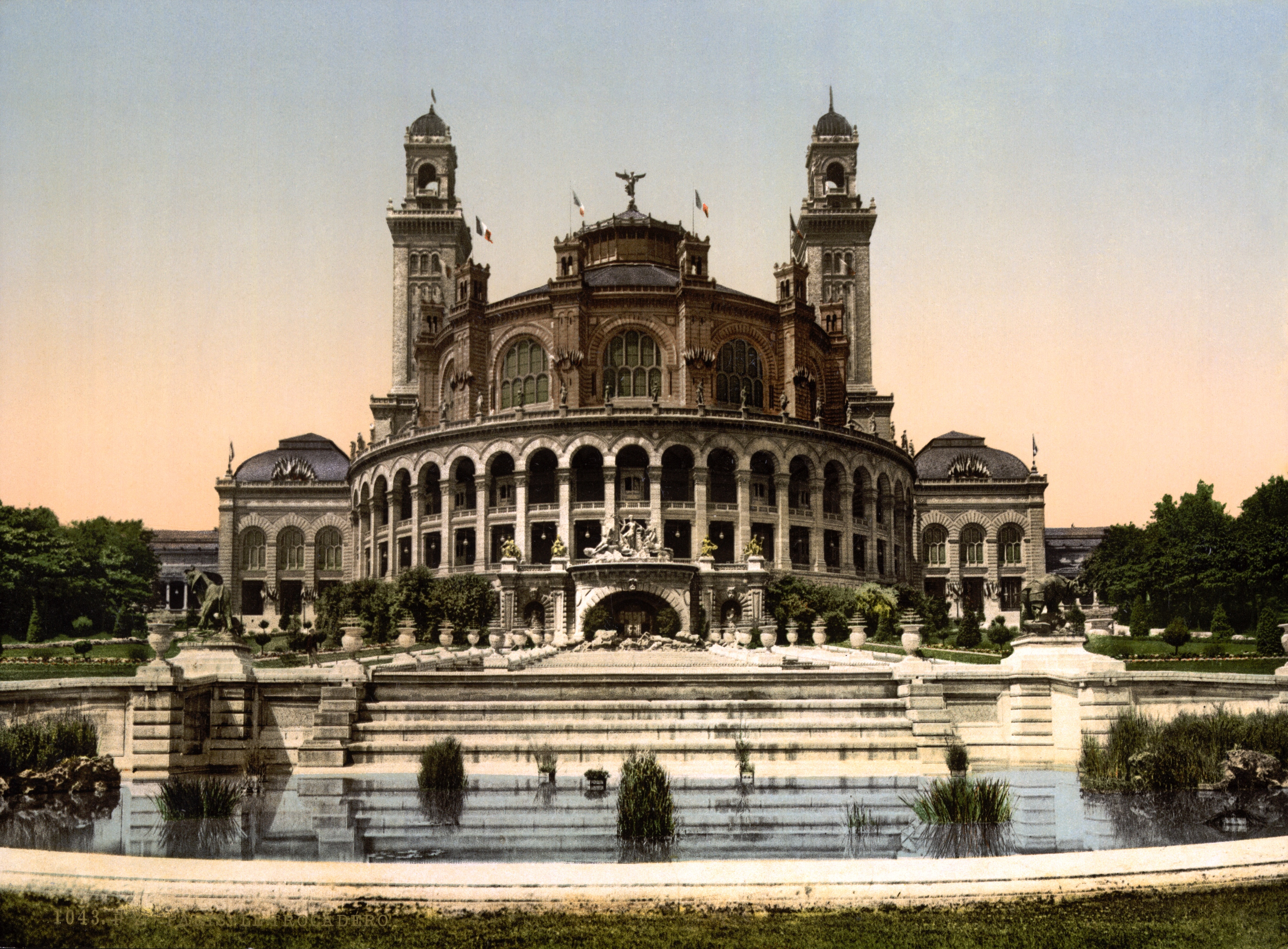
Trocadéro Palace

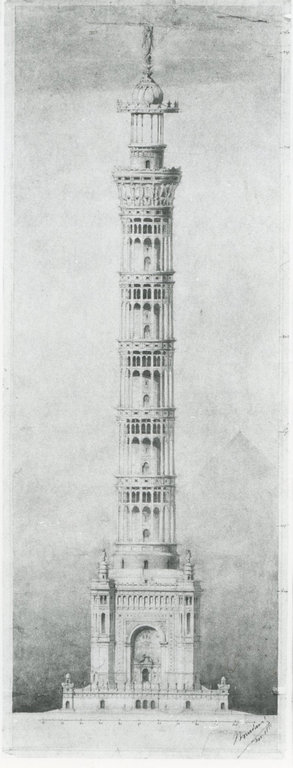
Design for a 370 metres (1,210 ft) monumental column, intended to rival the Eiffel Tower

== Bibliography ==
- Bourdais, Jules (1859). Traité pratique de la résistance des matériaux appliquée à la construction des ponts, des bâtiments, des machines, précédé de notions sommaires d'analyse et de mécanique, suivi de tables numériques donnant les moments d'inertie de plus de 500 sections de poutres différentes. Paris: Mallet-Bachelier.
- Mardaga, Pierre, ed. (1995). Archives d'architecture du vingtième siècle. Liège: Institut français d'architecture. p. 126-127. ISBN 2-87009-446-9.
- Philouze-Chatty, Claudine (2016). Jules Bourdais (1835-1915): un ingénieur chez les architectes (master's thesis). Toulouse: Université Jean-Jaurès.
