= Vaïssac =

- Commune
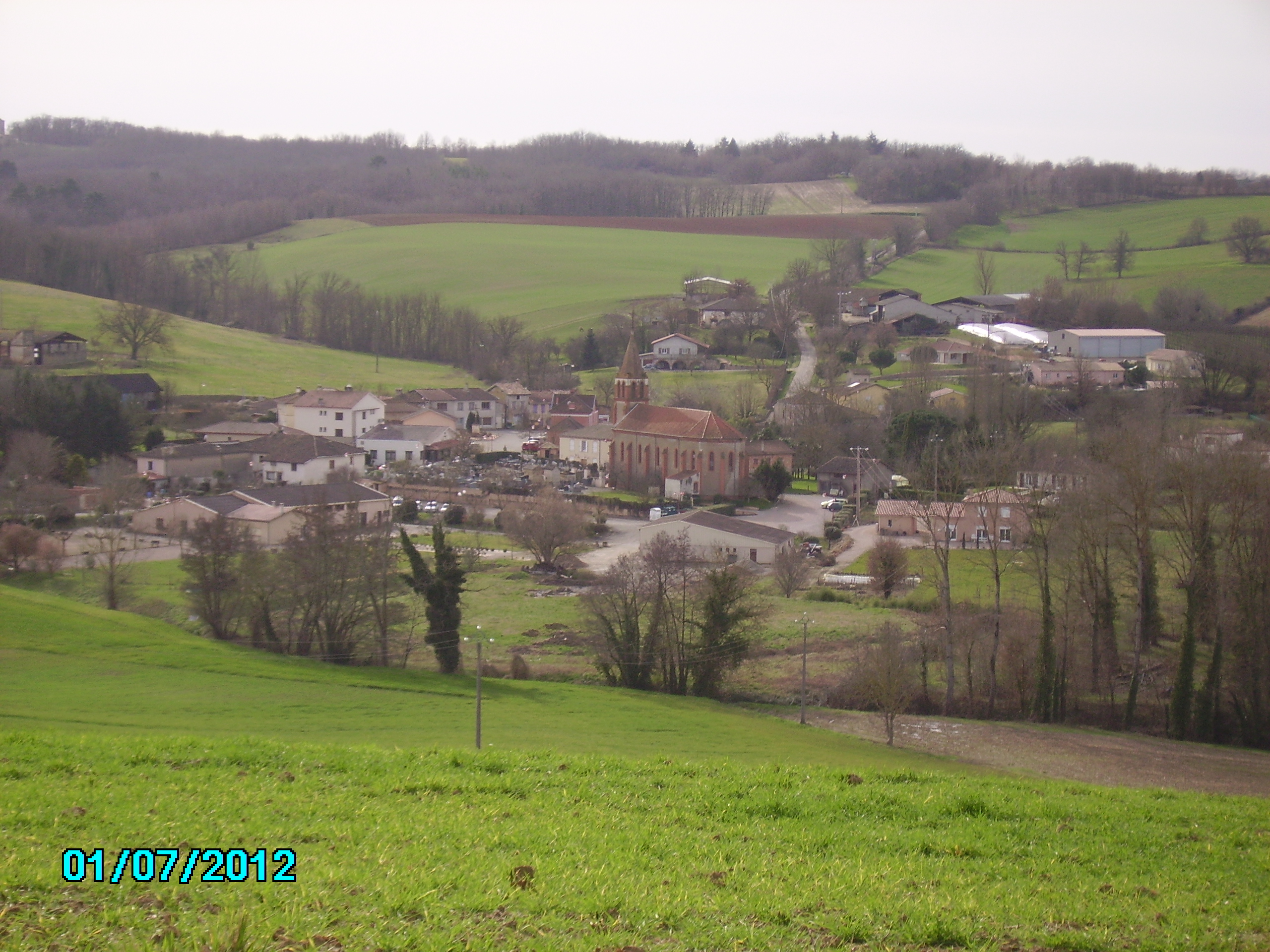
- A general view of the village of Vaïssac
- Location of Vaïssac
- Location within France Location within Occitanie
- Coordinates: 44°02′02″N 1°34′12″E
- Country: France
- Region: Occitania
- Department: Tarn-et-Garonne
- Arrondissement: Montauban
- Canton: Aveyron-Lère

Government
  - Mayor (2024–2026): Jean-Pierre Meilleurat
- Area^{1}: 37.21 km^{2} (14.37 sq mi)
- Elevation: 75 m (246 ft)
- Highest elevation: 225 m (738 ft)
- Lowest elevation: 99 m (325 ft)
- Population (2023): 964
  - Density: 25.9/km^{2} (67.1/sq mi)
- Time zone: UTC+01:00 (CET)
  - Summer (DST): UTC+02:00 (CEST)
- INSEE/Postal code: 82184 /82800
- ^{1} French Land Register data, which excludes lakes, ponds, glaciers > 1 km^{2} (0.386 sq mi or 247 acres) and river estuaries.

Vaïssac (French pronunciation: [vajsak]; Occitan: Baissac) is a commune in the Tarn-et-Garonne department in the Occitanie region in southern France.

== See also ==
- Communes of the Tarn-et-Garonne department
