= Canton of Aveyron-Lère =

Coordinates: 44.16°N 1.54°E

The canton of Aveyron-Lère is an administrative division of the Tarn-et-Garonne department, in southern France. It was created at the French canton reorganisation which came into effect in March 2015. Its seat is in Caussade.

It consists of the following communes:

1. Bioule
2. Caussade
3. Montricoux
4. Nègrepelisse
5. Saint-Étienne-de-Tulmont
6. Vaïssac
