= Saint-Étienne-de-Tulmont =

- Commune
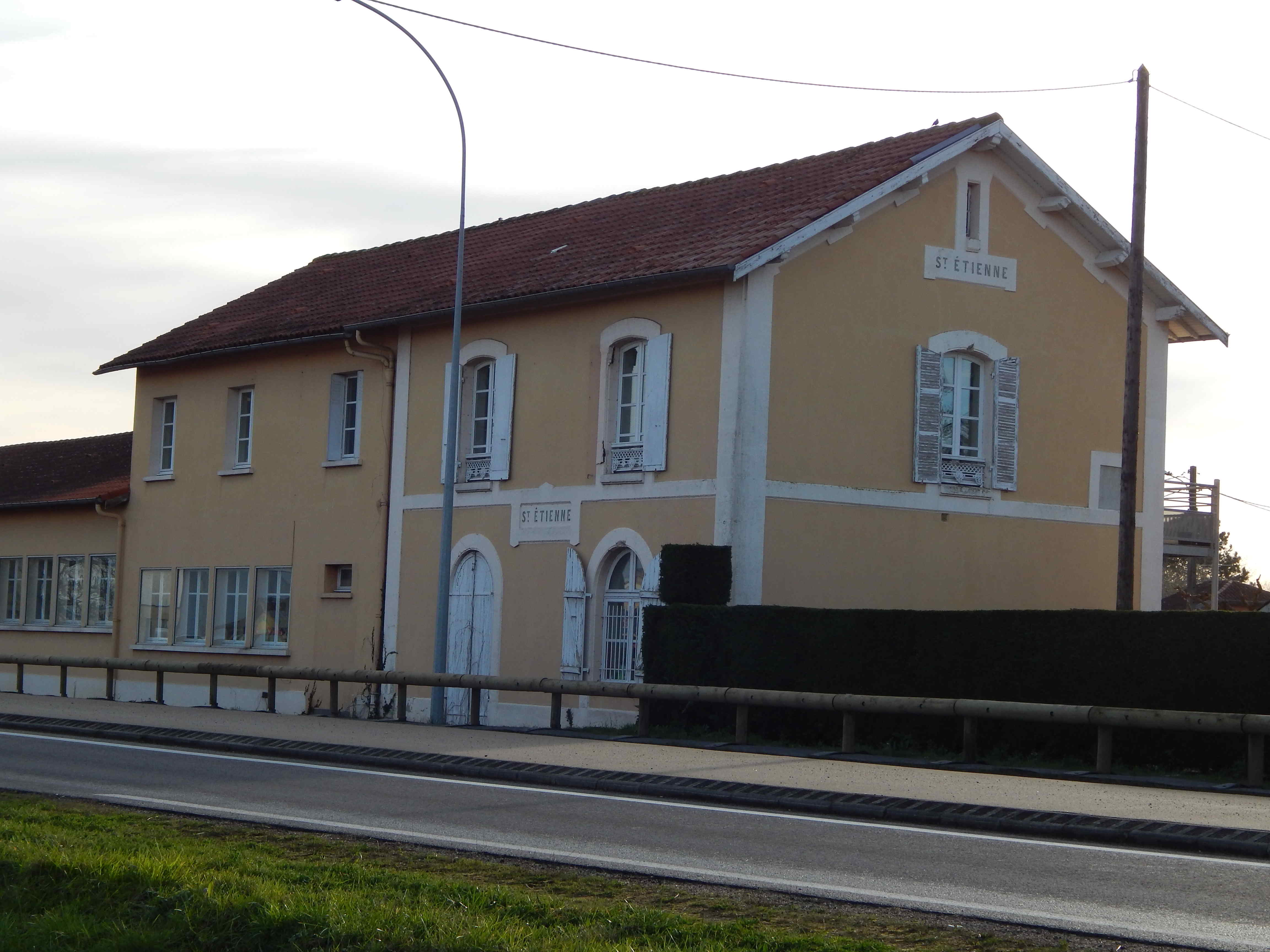
- The former railway station in Saint-Étienne-de-Tulmont

- Coat of arms
- Location of Saint-Étienne-de-Tulmont
- Location within France Location within Occitanie
- Coordinates: 44°02′56″N 1°27′46″E
- Country: France
- Region: Occitania
- Department: Tarn-et-Garonne
- Arrondissement: Montauban
- Canton: Aveyron-Lère

Government
  - Mayor (2020–2026): Eric Massip
- Area^{1}: 21.14 km^{2} (8.16 sq mi)
- Elevation: 108 m (354 ft)
- Highest elevation: 190 m (620 ft)
- Lowest elevation: 80 m (260 ft)
- Population (2023): 4,051
  - Density: 191.6/km^{2} (496.3/sq mi)
- Time zone: UTC+01:00 (CET)
  - Summer (DST): UTC+02:00 (CEST)
- INSEE/Postal code: 82161 /82410
- ^{1} French Land Register data, which excludes lakes, ponds, glaciers > 1 km^{2} (0.386 sq mi or 247 acres) and river estuaries.

Saint-Étienne-de-Tulmont (French pronunciation: [sɛ̃.t‿etjɛn də tylmɔ̃]; Languedocien: Sent Estèfe de Tulmon) is a commune in the Tarn-et-Garonne department in the Occitanie region in southern France.

== Population ==
Historical population
Year	Pop.	±% p.a.
1968	971	—
1975	1,293	+4.18%
1982	1,800	+4.84%
1990	2,210	+2.60%
1999	2,556	+1.63%
2007	3,212	+2.90%
2012	3,676	+2.74%
2017	3,788	+0.60%
2023	4,051	+1.13%
Source: INSEE

== See also ==
- Communes of the Tarn-et-Garonne department
