= Nègrepelisse massacre =

Incident during the Huguenot Rebellion

Nègrepelisse massacre (1622)
- Part of the Huguenot rebellions
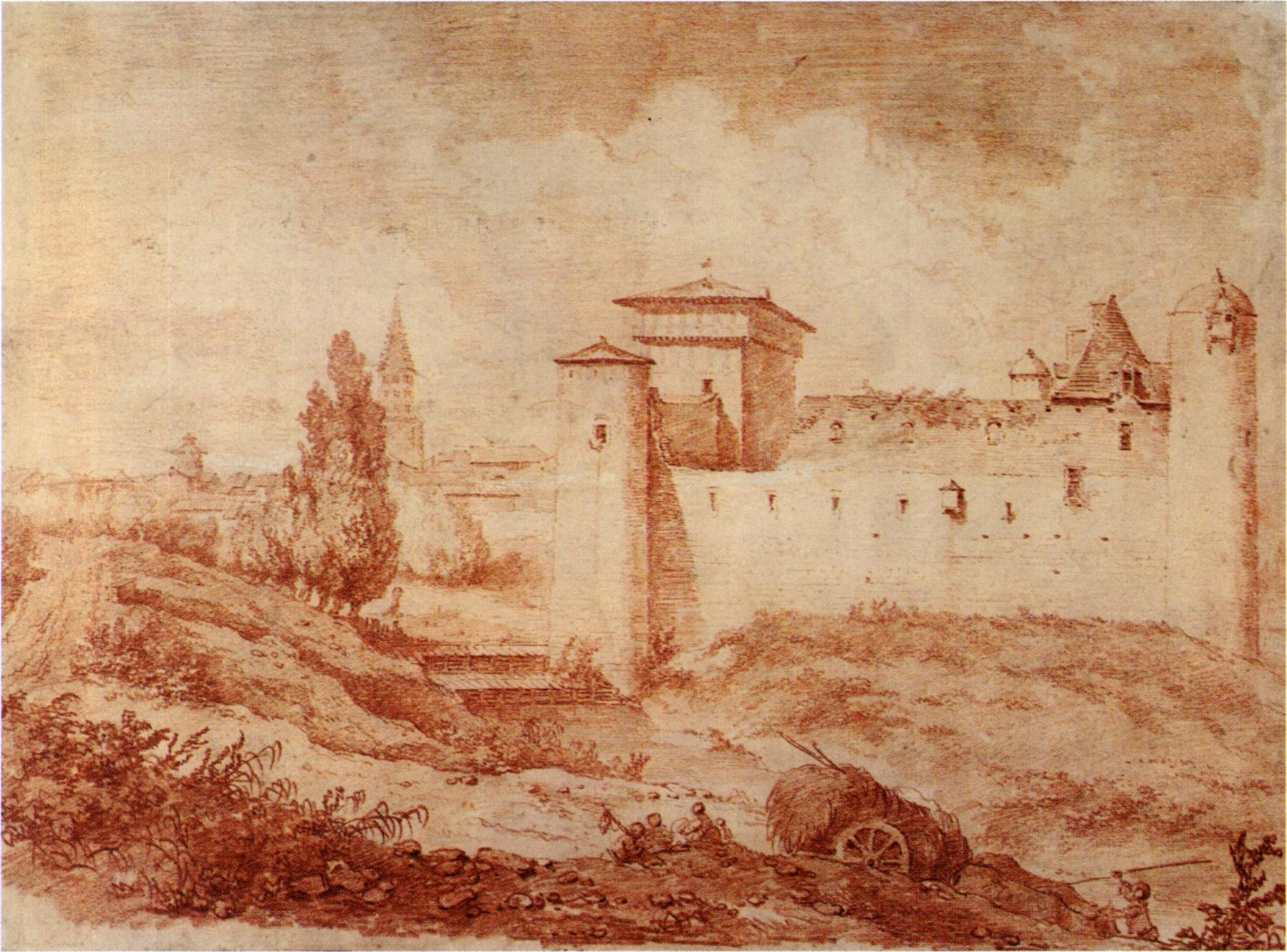
- A 1773 view of the citadel, left standing in 1622
Date	10–11 June 1622
Location	Nègrepelisse 44°04′34″N 1°31′19″E
Result	Royal victory

Belligerents
France	Huguenot

Commanders and leaders
Louis XIII; Duke of Mayenne	Unknown

Casualties and losses
	About 800

The Nègrepelisse massacre was a massacre committed on 10 and 11 June 1622 by the French Royal Army of King Louis XIII in the Protestant stronghold of Nègrepelisse during the Huguenot rebellions. The taking of the town followed Louis's unsuccessful siege of Montauban.

After a short siege the town was captured by assault, and all the inhabitants that the attacking soldiers encountered were put to the sword, without distinction of age or sex, to a total of about 800. According to one source, "all the women and girls were raped and massacred". The town was then looted and deliberately burned to the ground. This severe treatment was in retaliation for the alleged massacre of a royal regiment left in garrison in the city by the Duke of Mayenne. The king had ordered:

I command you to give no quarter to any man, because they have irritated me, and shall be served as they treated the others.

— Louis XIII.

The Huguenot garrison that had attempted to hold out in the town's citadel were obliged to surrender the next day, and all the men were hanged. The anonymous author of a contemporary report celebrating the massacre as a royal victory and a just punishment of rebels remarked that:

These traitors and rebels suffered all the chastisement that the mind of man might imagine to punish crime and rebellion, and those who escaped the fire and the blood ended their lives on gibbets as an example and a horror to those who would wish to imitate them. I have never heard of or seen a more horrible spectacle than this, for we marched over the bodies of the dead stretched naked and mutilated in the streets, which would touch the hardest of hearts.

== See also ==
- French Wars of Religion
- Huguenot rebellions
