= Bioule =

- Commune
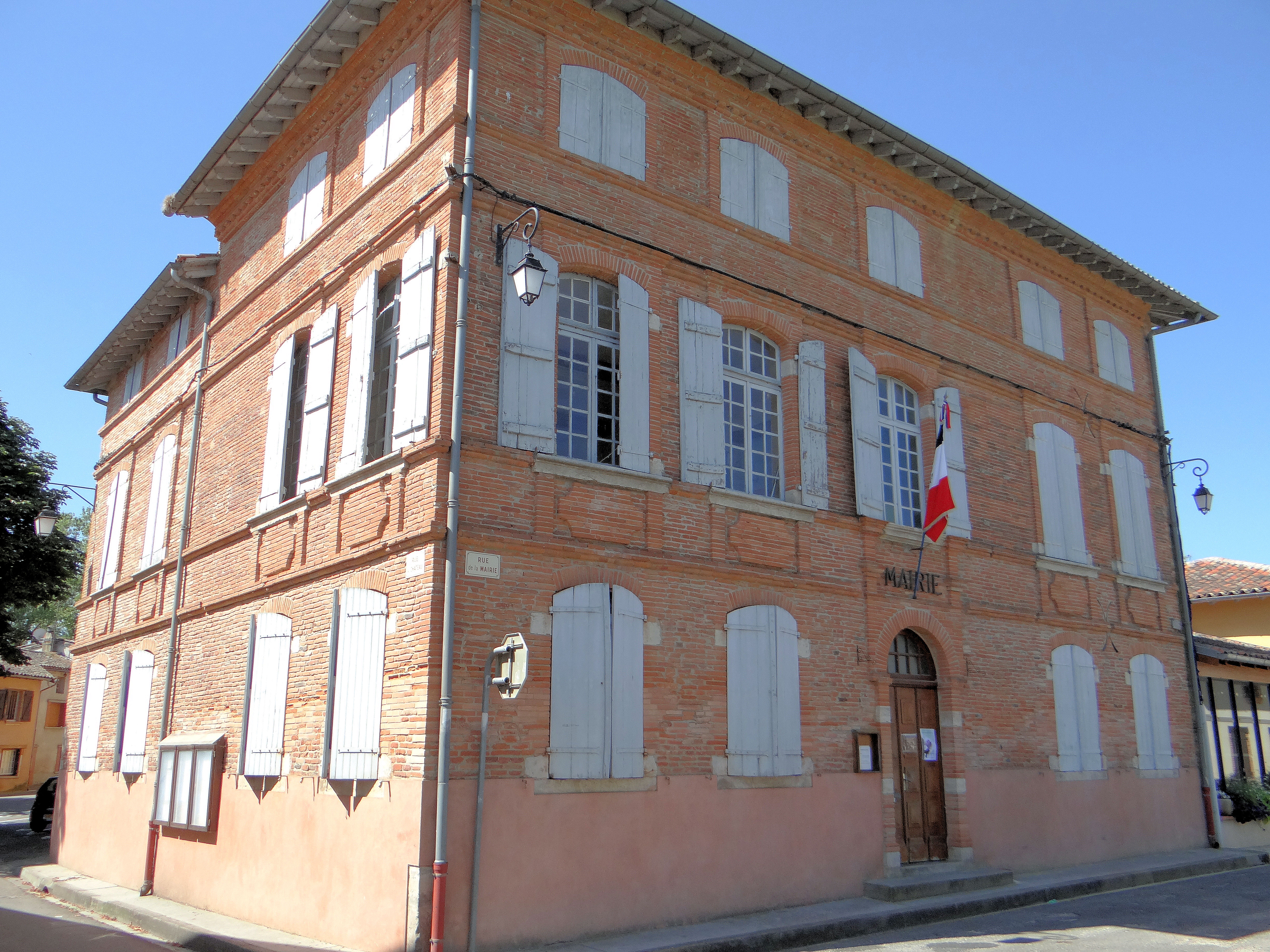
- The town hall in Bioule

- Coat of arms
- Location of Bioule
- Location within France Location within Occitanie
- Coordinates: 44°05′25″N 1°32′21″E
- Country: France
- Region: Occitania
- Department: Tarn-et-Garonne
- Arrondissement: Montauban
- Canton: Aveyron-Lère

Government
  - Mayor (2020–2026): Gabriel Serra
- Area^{1}: 20.44 km^{2} (7.89 sq mi)
- Elevation: 85 m (279 ft)
- Highest elevation: 208 m (682 ft)
- Lowest elevation: 84 m (276 ft)
- Population (2023): 1,201
  - Density: 58.76/km^{2} (152.2/sq mi)
- Time zone: UTC+01:00 (CET)
  - Summer (DST): UTC+02:00 (CEST)
- INSEE/Postal code: 82018 /82800
- ^{1} French Land Register data, which excludes lakes, ponds, glaciers > 1 km^{2} (0.386 sq mi or 247 acres) and river estuaries.

Bioule (French pronunciation: [bjul]; Occitan: Biule) is a commune in the Tarn-et-Garonne department in the Occitanie region in southern France.

== See also ==
- Communes of the Tarn-et-Garonne department
