= Esquieu de Floyran =

French prior

Esquieu de Floyran (Floyrac or Foyrac) was a prior of Montfaucon in the Abbey of Saint Martial in Limoges.

Native from Béziers, he spoke falsely and disloyally against the order of the Temple, and so became a traitor with Guillaume Robert, Bernard Pelet and Gérard de Boyzol. He then was imprisoned.

In 1308 he wrote a letter to the king of Aragon James II reminding him that when he visited him in Lerida in early 1305 he had given information about the order. Ponsard de Gizy, commanderie de Payns, mentioned him on 27 November 1309 as one of the instigators of the Trials of the Knights Templar.

== Bibliography ==
- Demurger, Alain (2008a) [2005]. Les Templiers, une chevalerie chrétienne au Moyen Âge. Paris: Éditions du Seuil. p. 664. ISBN 978-2-7578-1122-1.
