= Nègrepelisse =

- Commune
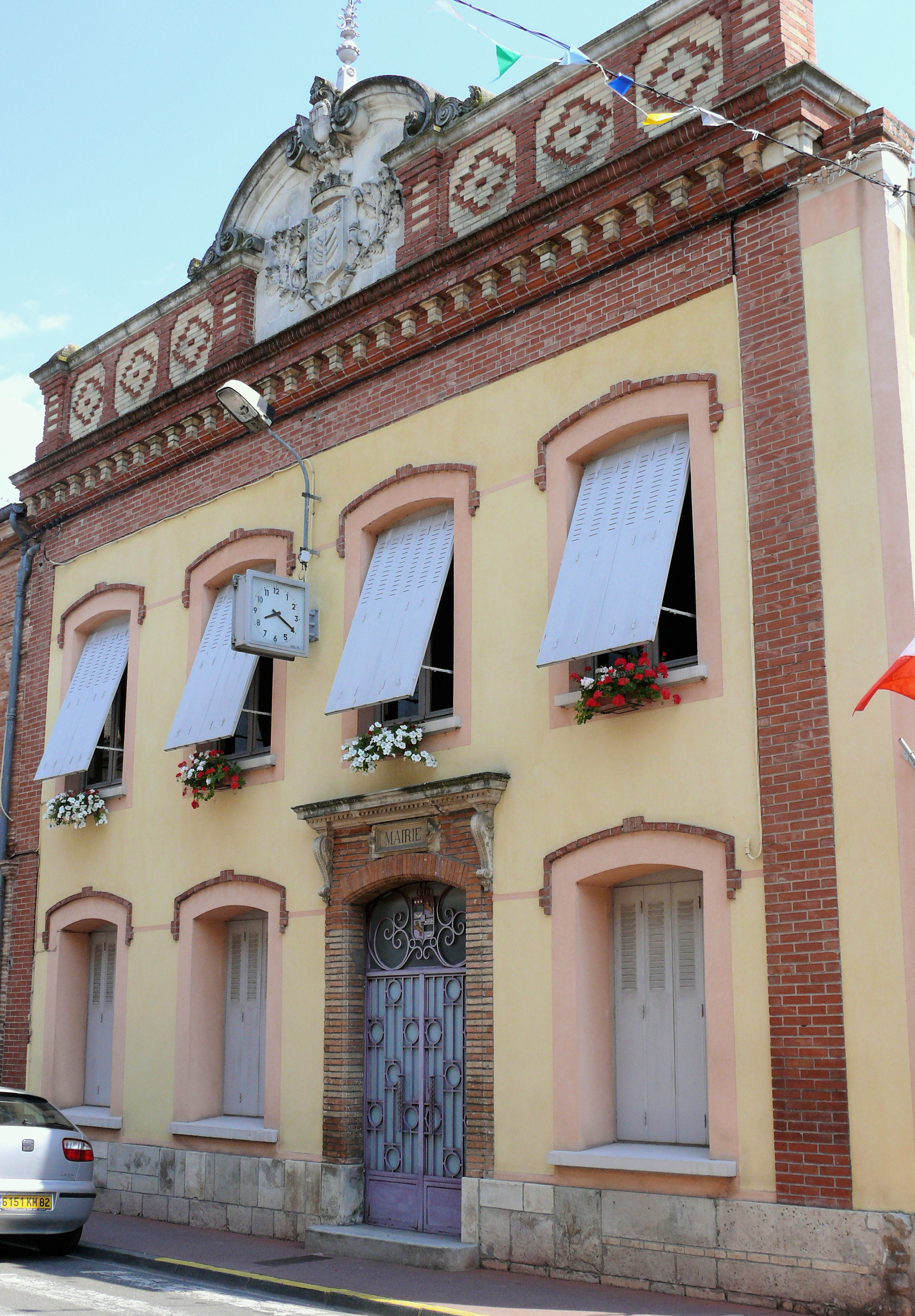
- The town hall of Nègrepelisse

- Coat of arms
- Location of Nègrepelisse
- Location within France Location within Occitanie
- Coordinates: 44°04′34″N 1°31′19″E
- Country: France
- Region: Occitania
- Department: Tarn-et-Garonne
- Arrondissement: Montauban
- Canton: Aveyron-Lère

Government
  - Mayor (2020–2026): Morgan Tellier
- Area^{1}: 49.22 km^{2} (19.00 sq mi)
- Elevation: 103 m (338 ft)
- Highest elevation: 207 m (679 ft)
- Lowest elevation: 79 m (259 ft)
- Population (2023): 5,917
  - Density: 120.2/km^{2} (311.4/sq mi)
- Time zone: UTC+01:00 (CET)
  - Summer (DST): UTC+02:00 (CEST)
- INSEE/Postal code: 82134 /82800
- ^{1} French Land Register data, which excludes lakes, ponds, glaciers > 1 km^{2} (0.386 sq mi or 247 acres) and river estuaries.

Nègrepelisse (French pronunciation: [nɛɡʁəpəlis]; Occitan: Negrapelissa) is a commune in the Tarn-et-Garonne department in the Occitanie region in southern France. It lies on the river Aveyron. The village was the setting for the Nègrepelisse massacre, which took place in 1622.

== Population ==
Historical population
| Year | Pop. | ±% p.a. |
|---|---|---|
| 1968 | 2,409 | — |
| 1975 | 2,589 | +1.03% |
| 1982 | 2,871 | +1.49% |
| 1990 | 3,326 | +1.86% |
| 1999 | 3,487 | +0.53% |
| 2007 | 4,655 | +3.68% |
| 2012 | 5,343 | +2.80% |
| 2017 | 5,628 | +1.04% |
| 2023 | 5,917 | +0.84% |
Source: INSEE

== See also ==
- Communes of the Tarn-et-Garonne department
