= Canton of Saint-Nicolas-de-la-Grave =

Coordinates: 43°59′32″N 1°03′28″E

Saint-Nicolas-de-la-Grave
- Former canton
- Interactive map of Saint-Nicolas-de-la-Grave
- Country: France
- Region: Occitania
- Department: Tarn-et-Garonne
- No. of communes: {{{nbcomm}}}
- Disbanded: 2015
- Population (2012): 6,520

The canton of Saint-Nicolas-de-la-Grave is a French former administrative division in the department of Tarn-et-Garonne. It had 6,520 inhabitants (2012). It was disbanded following the French canton reorganisation which came into effect in March 2015.

The canton comprised the following communes:

- Saint-Nicolas-de-la-Grave
- Angeville
- Castelferrus
- Castelmayran
- Caumont
- Cordes-Tolosannes
- Coutures
- Fajolles
- Garganvillar
- Labourgade
- Lafitte
- Montaïn
- Saint-Aignan
- Saint-Arroumex
