= Cumont =

Cumont may refer to:

- Cumont (commune), a commune in southern France
- Lamothe-Cumont, another commune in Southern France, neighbouring Cumont
- Franz Cumont, a Belgian archaeologist, historian, and philologist
- Charles Cumont, a Belgian pentathlete
