= Arrondissement of Castelsarrasin =

Coordinates: 44°03′N 1°06′E

Castelsarrasin
- Arrondissement
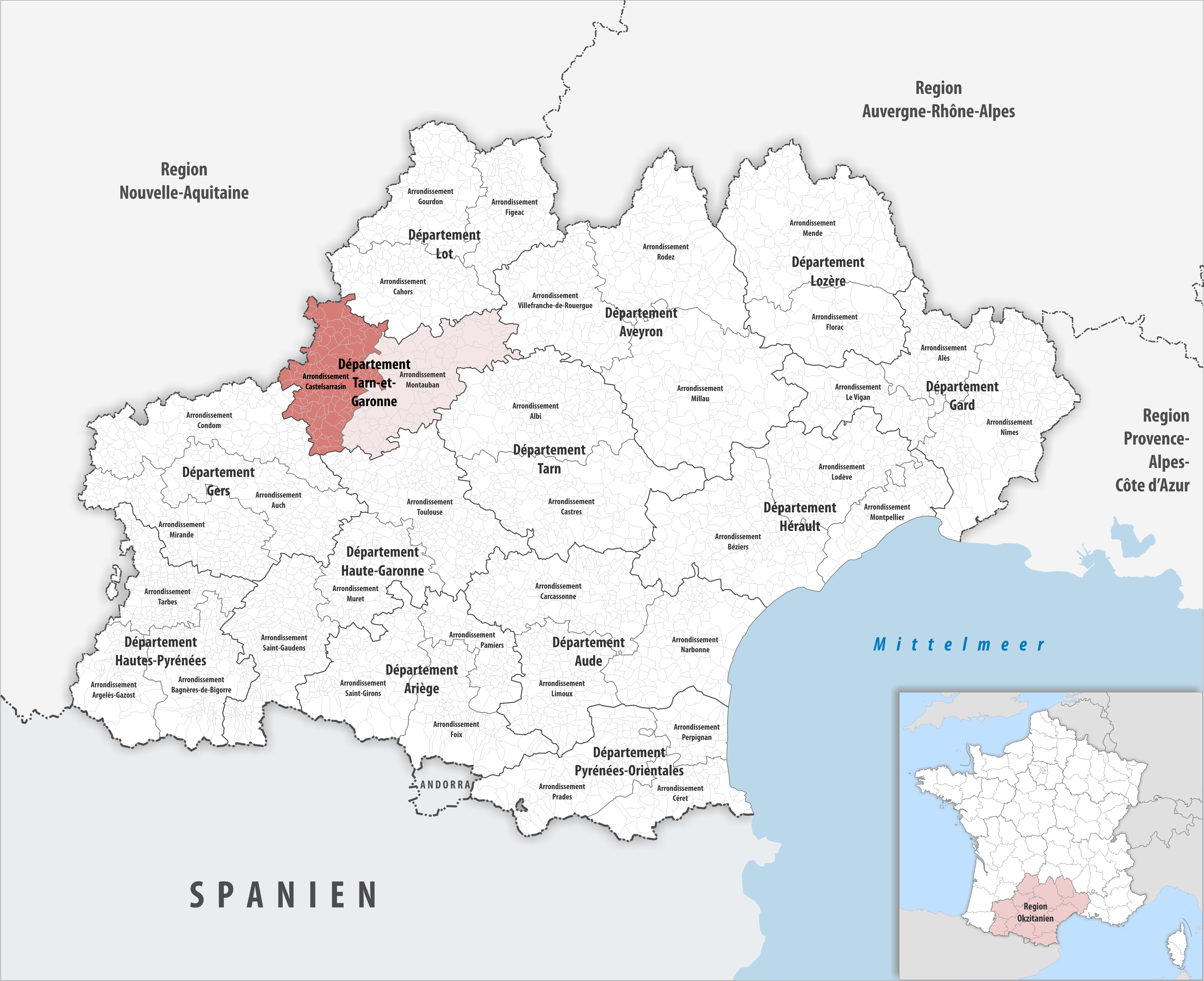
- Location within the region Occitanie
- Country: France
- Region: Occitania
- Department: Tarn-et-Garonne
- No. of communes: {{{nbcomm}}}
- Area: 1,601.5 km^{2} (618.3 sq mi)
- Population (2023): 78,948
  - Density: 49.296/km^{2} (127.68/sq mi)
- INSEE code: 821

The arrondissement of Castelsarrasin is an arrondissement of France in the Tarn-et-Garonne department in the Occitania region. It has 103 communes. Its population is 78,979 (2021), and its area is 1,601.5 km^{2} (618.3 sq mi).

== Composition ==
The communes of the arrondissement of Castelsarrasin, and their INSEE codes, are:

1. Albefeuille-Lagarde (82001)
2. Angeville (82003)
3. Asques (82004)
4. Auterive (82006)
5. Auvillar (82008)
6. Balignac (82009)
7. Bardigues (82010)
8. Barry-d'Islemade (82011)
9. Les Barthes (82012)
10. Beaumont-de-Lomagne (82013)
11. Belbèze-en-Lomagne (82015)
12. Belvèze (82016)
13. Boudou (82019)
14. Bouloc-en-Quercy (82021)
15. Bourg-de-Visa (82022)
16. Brassac (82024)
17. Castelferrus (82030)
18. Castelmayran (82031)
19. Castelsagrat (82032)
20. Castelsarrasin (82033)
21. Castéra-Bouzet (82034)
22. Caumont (82035)
23. Le Causé (82036)
24. Cazes-Mondenard (82042)
25. Cordes-Tolosannes (82045)
26. Coutures (82046)
27. Cumont (82047)
28. Donzac (82049)
29. Dunes (82050)
30. Durfort-Lacapelette (82051)
31. Escazeaux (82053)
32. Espalais (82054)
33. Esparsac (82055)
34. Fajolles (82058)
35. Faudoas (82059)
36. Fauroux (82060)
37. Garganvillar (82063)
38. Gariès (82064)
39. Gasques (82065)
40. Gensac (82067)
41. Gimat (82068)
42. Glatens (82070)
43. Goas (82071)
44. Golfech (82072)
45. Goudourville (82073)
46. Gramont (82074)
47. Labastide-du-Temple (82080)
48. Labourgade (82081)
49. Lachapelle (82083)
50. Lacour (82084)
51. Lafitte (82086)
52. Lamagistère (82089)
53. Lamothe-Cumont (82091)
54. Larrazet (82093)
55. Lauzerte (82094)
56. Lavit (82097)
57. Lizac (82099)
58. Malause (82101)
59. Mansonville (82102)
60. Marignac (82103)
61. Marsac (82104)
62. Maubec (82106)
63. Maumusson (82107)
64. Meauzac (82108)
65. Merles (82109)
66. Miramont-de-Quercy (82111)
67. Moissac (82112)
68. Montagudet (82116)
69. Montaigu-de-Quercy (82117)
70. Montaïn (82118)
71. Montbarla (82122)
72. Montesquieu (82127)
73. Montgaillard (82129)
74. Montjoi (82130)
75. Perville (82138)
76. Le Pin (82139)
77. Pommevic (82141)
78. Poupas (82143)
79. Puygaillard-de-Lomagne (82146)
80. Roquecor (82151)
81. Saint-Aignan (82152)
82. Saint-Amans-de-Pellagal (82154)
83. Saint-Amans-du-Pech (82153)
84. Saint-Arroumex (82156)
85. Saint-Beauzeil (82157)
86. Saint-Cirice (82158)
87. Saint-Clair (82160)
88. Sainte-Juliette (82164)
89. Saint-Jean-du-Bouzet (82163)
90. Saint-Loup (82165)
91. Saint-Michel (82166)
92. Saint-Nazaire-de-Valentane (82168)
93. Saint-Nicolas-de-la-Grave (82169)
94. Saint-Paul-d'Espis (82170)
95. Saint-Vincent-Lespinasse (82175)
96. Sauveterre (82177)
97. Sérignac (82180)
98. Sistels (82181)
99. Touffailles (82182)
100. Tréjouls (82183)
101. Valeilles (82185)
102. Valence (82186)
103. Vigueron (82193)

== History ==
The arrondissement of Castelsarrasin was created in 1800 as part of the department Haute-Garonne. It became part of the new department Tarn-et-Garonne in 1808.

As a result of the reorganisation of the cantons of France which came into effect in 2015, the borders of the cantons are no longer related to the borders of the arrondissements. The cantons of the arrondissement of Castelsarrasin were, as of January 2015:

1. Auvillar
2. Beaumont-de-Lomagne
3. Bourg-de-Visa
4. Castelsarrasin-1
5. Castelsarrasin-2
6. Lauzerte
7. Lavit
8. Moissac-1
9. Moissac-2
10. Montaigu-de-Quercy
11. Saint-Nicolas-de-la-Grave
12. Valence
