= Maubec =

Maubec may refer to several communes in France:

- Maubec, Isère
- Maubec, Tarn-et-Garonne
- Maubec, Vaucluse
