= Auterive =

Auterive is the name of the following communes in France:

- Auterive, Haute-Garonne, in the Haute-Garonne department
- Auterive, Gers, in the Gers department
- Auterive, Tarn-et-Garonne, in the Tarn-et-Garonne department
