= Comberouger =

- Commune
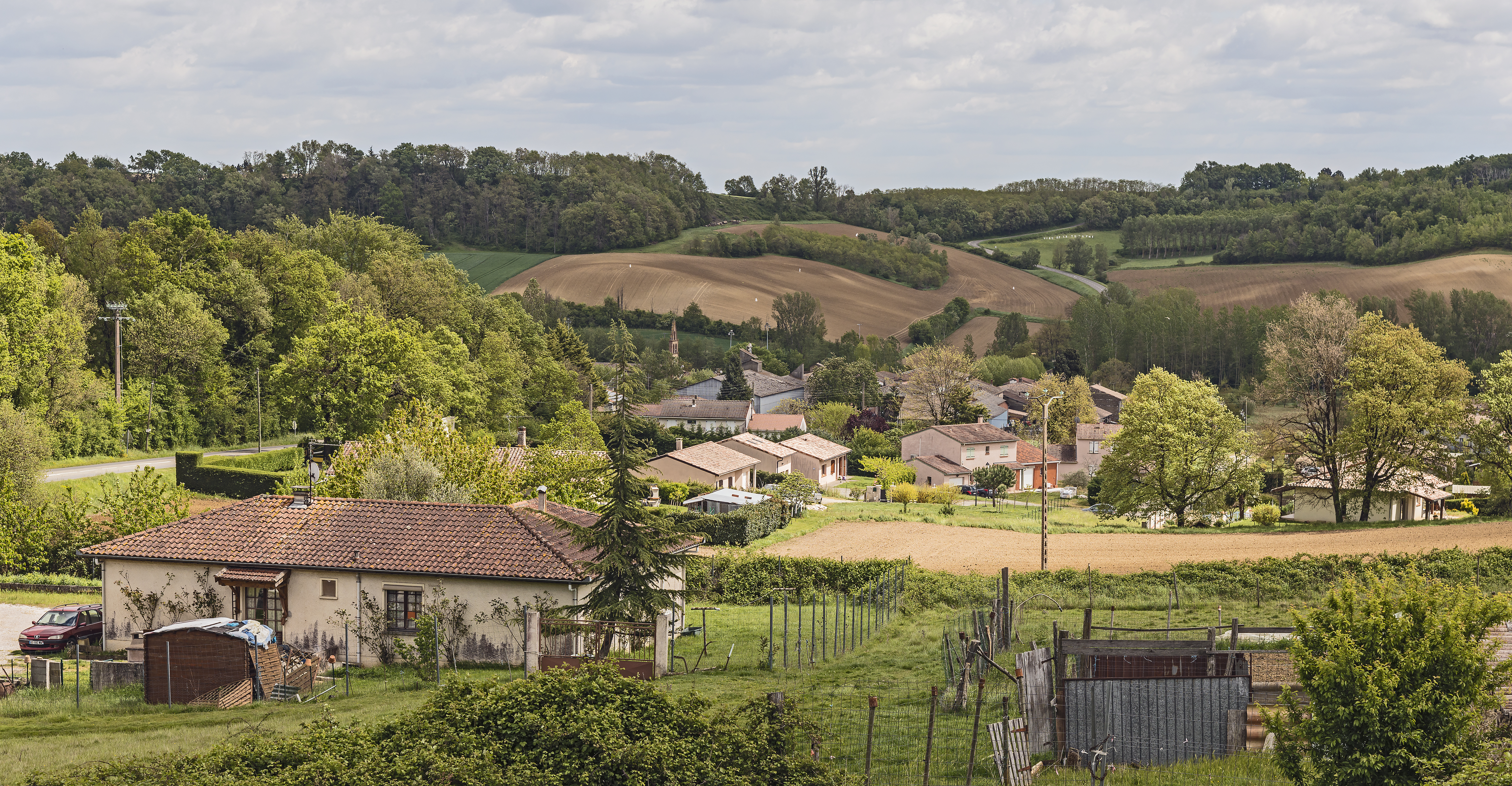
- A general view of Comberouger
- Location of Comberouger
- Location within France Location within Occitanie
- Coordinates: 43°51′46″N 1°06′13″E
- Country: France
- Region: Occitania
- Department: Tarn-et-Garonne
- Arrondissement: Montauban
- Canton: Beaumont-de-Lomagne

Government
  - Mayor (2020–2026): Christian Mouriau
- Area^{1}: 12.22 km^{2} (4.72 sq mi)
- Elevation: 80 m (260 ft)
- Highest elevation: 235 m (771 ft)
- Lowest elevation: 125 m (410 ft)
- Population (2023): 268
  - Density: 21.9/km^{2} (56.8/sq mi)
- Time zone: UTC+01:00 (CET)
  - Summer (DST): UTC+02:00 (CEST)
- INSEE/Postal code: 82043 /82600
- ^{1} French Land Register data, which excludes lakes, ponds, glaciers > 1 km^{2} (0.386 sq mi or 247 acres) and river estuaries.

Comberouger is a commune in the Tarn-et-Garonne department in the Occitanie region in southern France.

== Sites and monuments ==
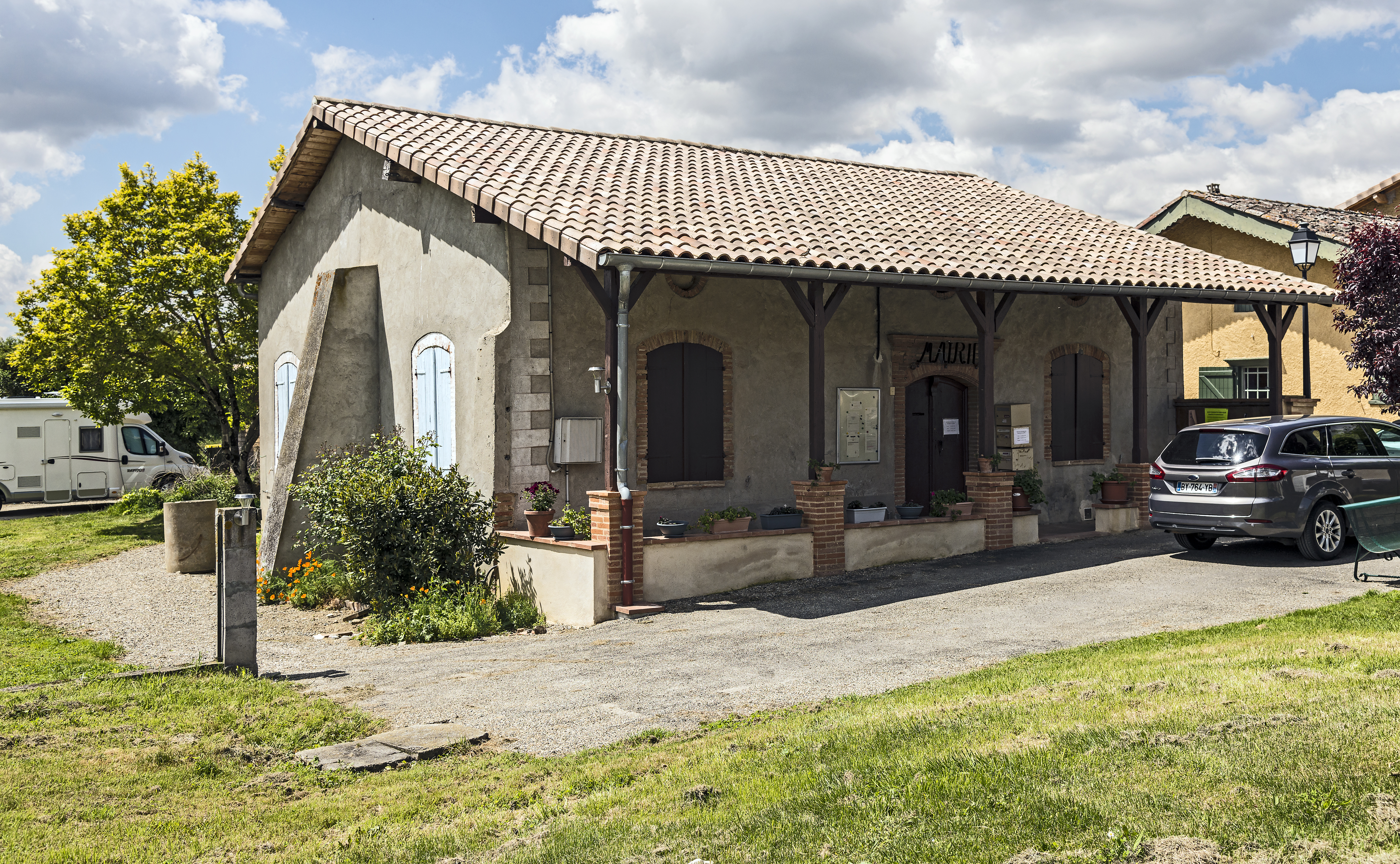
Town hall

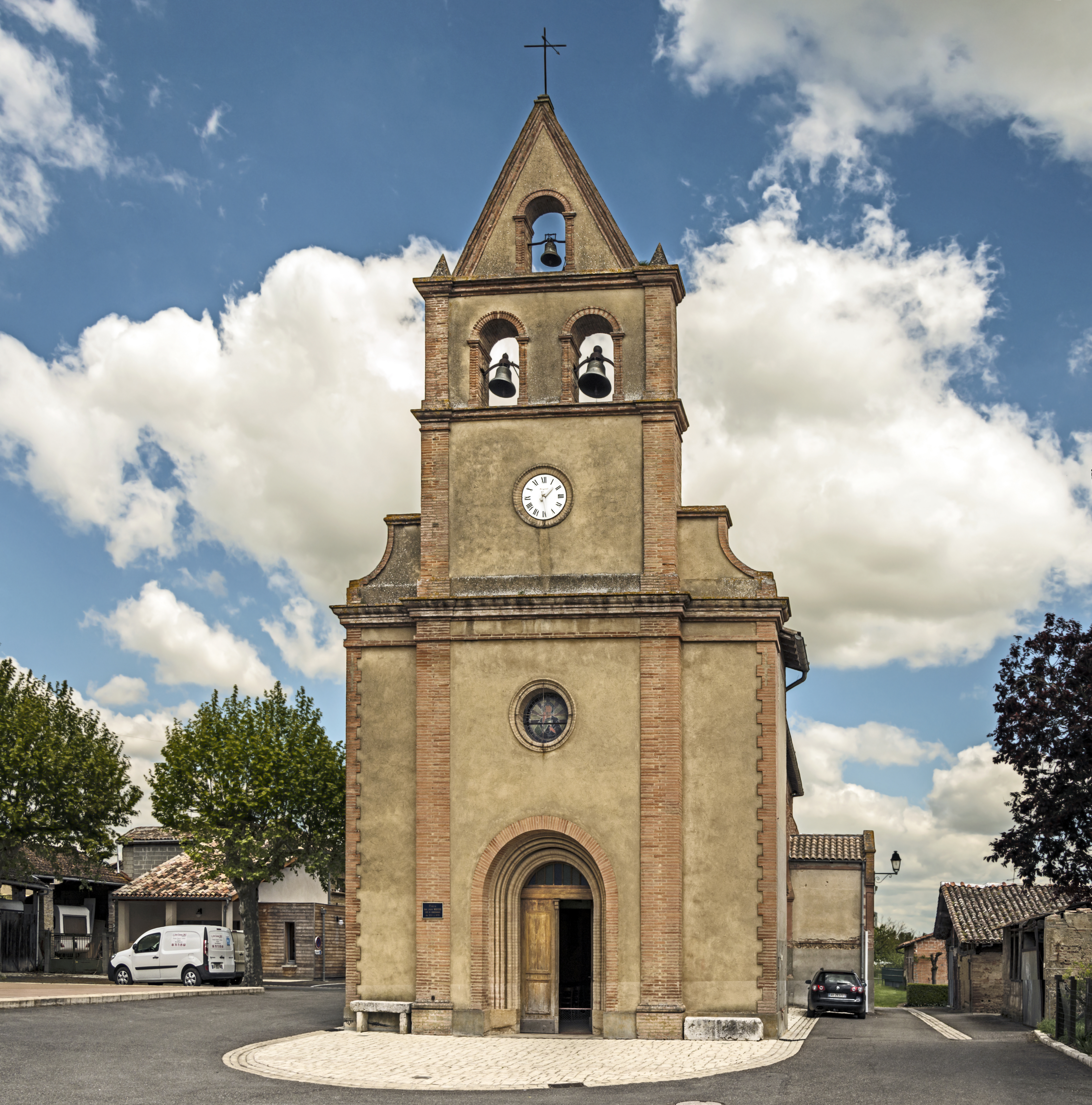
St Barthelemy church

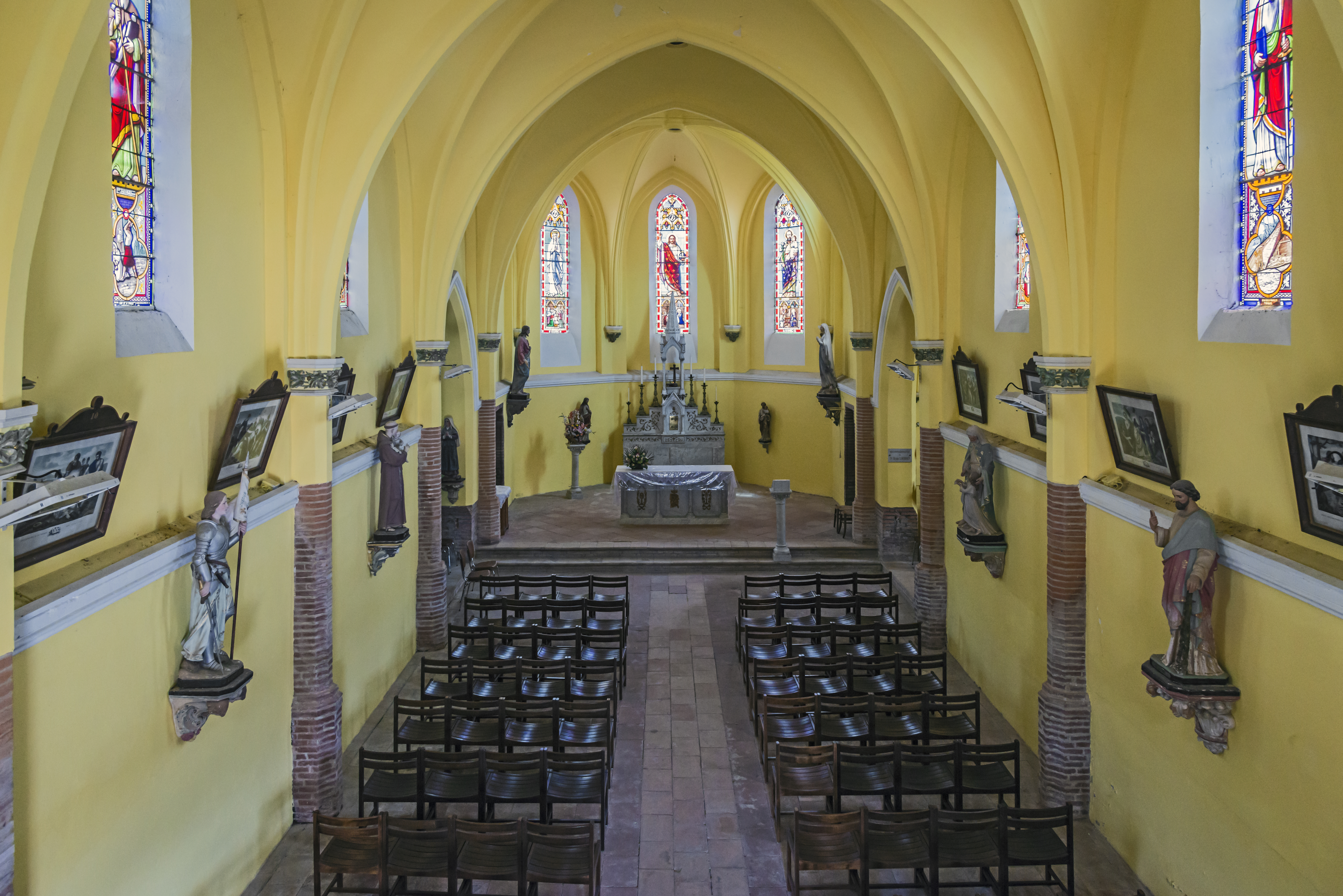
Inside the church

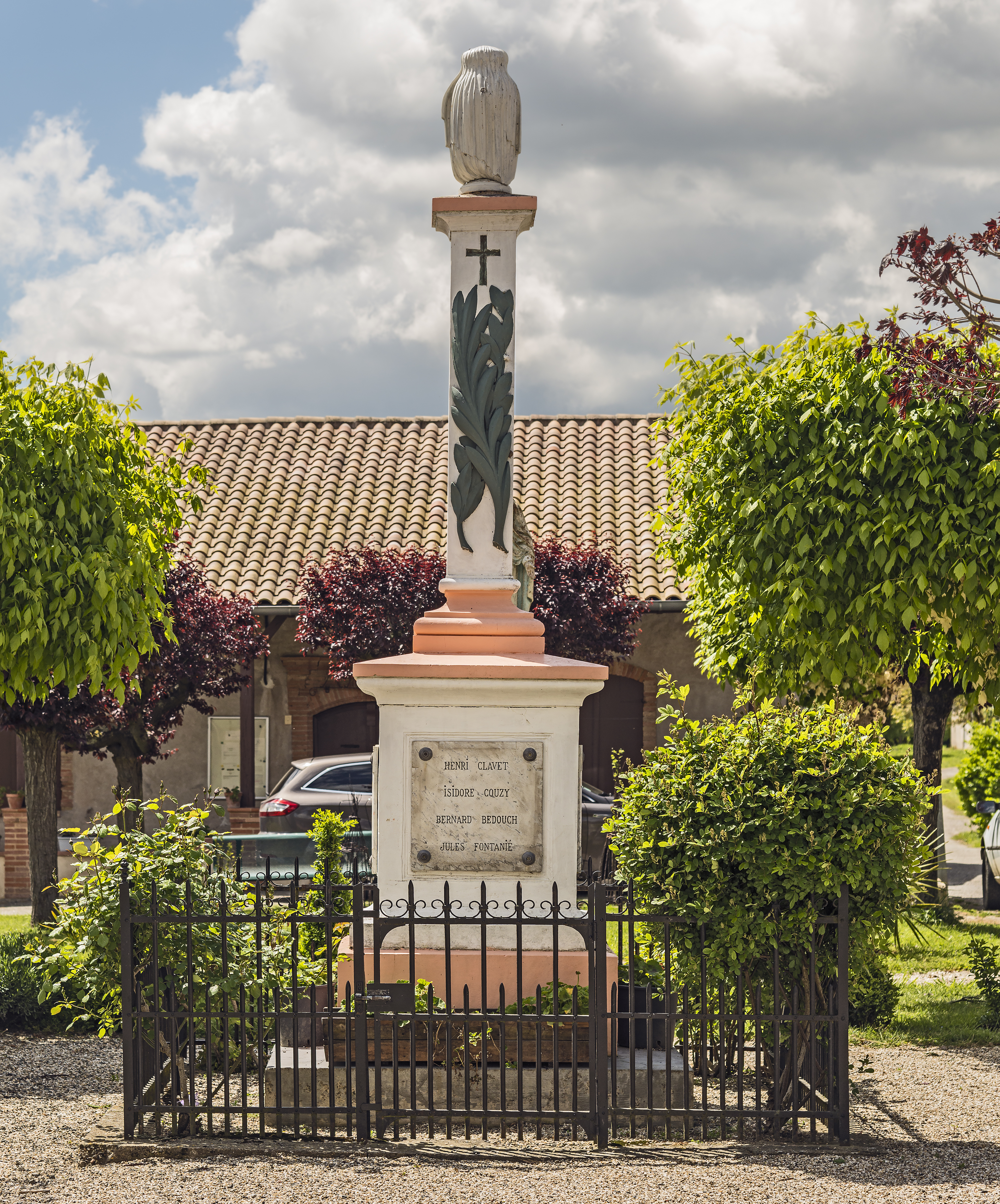
War memorial

== See also ==
- Communes of the Tarn-et-Garonne department
