= Perville =

Commune in Occitanie, southwest France

- Commune
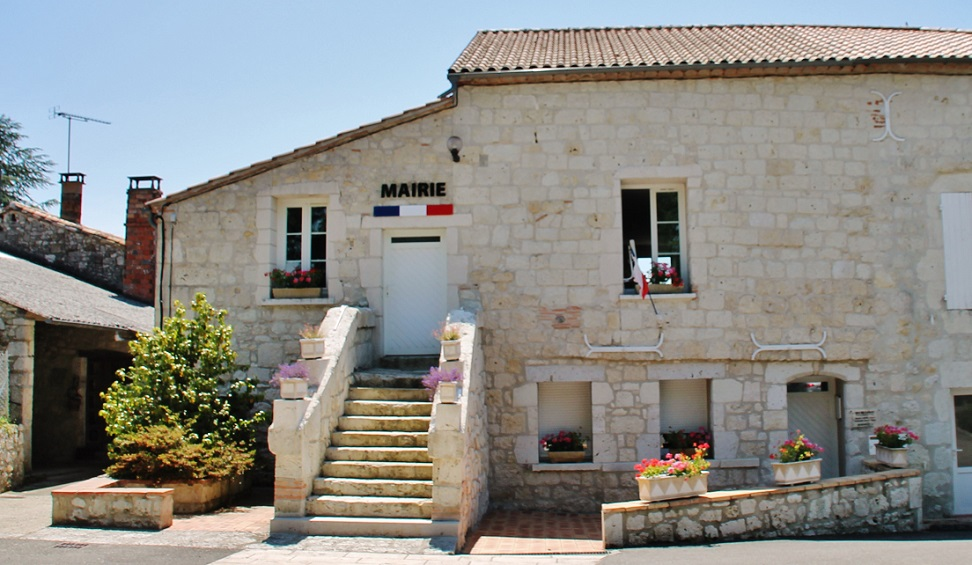
- Town hall
- Location of Perville
- Location within France Location within Occitanie
- Coordinates: 44°10′53″N 0°52′50″E
- Country: France
- Region: Occitania
- Department: Tarn-et-Garonne
- Arrondissement: Castelsarrasin
- Canton: Valence
- Intercommunality: Deux Rives

Government
  - Mayor (2020–2026): Eric Delfariel
- Area^{1}: 9.27 km^{2} (3.58 sq mi)
- Elevation: 192 m (630 ft)
- Highest elevation: 203 m (666 ft)
- Lowest elevation: 72 m (236 ft)
- Population (2023): 165
  - Density: 17.8/km^{2} (46.1/sq mi)
- Time zone: UTC+01:00 (CET)
  - Summer (DST): UTC+02:00 (CEST)
- INSEE/Postal code: 82138 /82400
- ^{1} French Land Register data, which excludes lakes, ponds, glaciers > 1 km^{2} (0.386 sq mi or 247 acres) and river estuaries.

Perville (French pronunciation: [pɛʁvil]; Occitan: Pèrvila) is a commune in the Tarn-et-Garonne department in the Occitanie region in southern France.

== Geography ==
The Séoune forms the commune's northern border.

== See also ==
- Communes of the Tarn-et-Garonne department
