= Sérignac, Tarn-et-Garonne =

Sérignac
- Commune
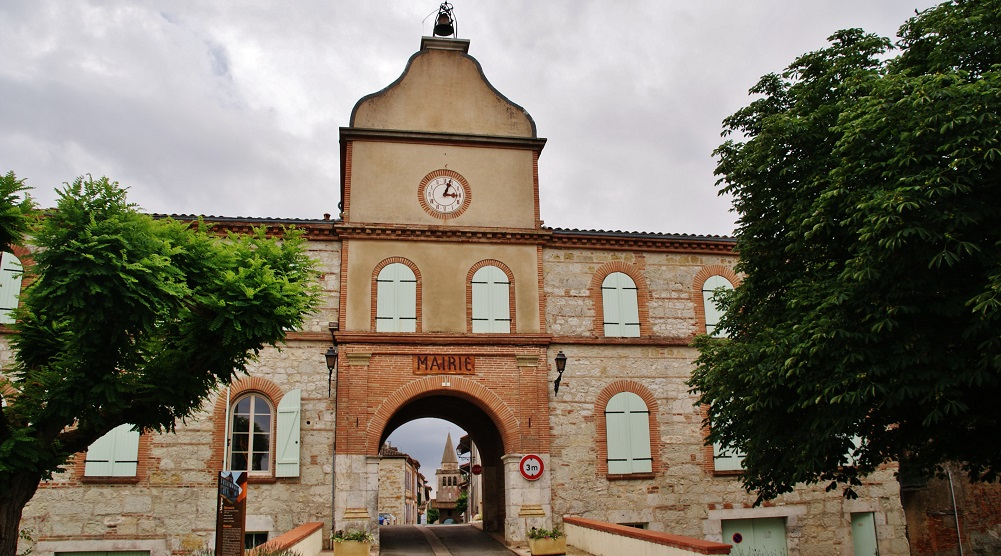
- Location of Sérignac
- Location within France Location within Occitanie
- Coordinates: 43°55′19″N 1°01′22″E
- Country: France
- Region: Occitania
- Department: Tarn-et-Garonne
- Arrondissement: Castelsarrasin
- Canton: Beaumont-de-Lomagne
- Intercommunality: Lomagne Tarn-et-Garonnaise

Government
  - Mayor (2020–2026): Christian Lagarde
- Area^{1}: 32.43 km^{2} (12.52 sq mi)
- Elevation: 220 m (720 ft)
- Highest elevation: 230 m (750 ft)
- Lowest elevation: 89 m (292 ft)
- Population (2023): 518
  - Density: 16.0/km^{2} (41.4/sq mi)
- Time zone: UTC+01:00 (CET)
  - Summer (DST): UTC+02:00 (CEST)
- INSEE/Postal code: 82180 /82500
- ^{1} French Land Register data, which excludes lakes, ponds, glaciers > 1 km^{2} (0.386 sq mi or 247 acres) and river estuaries.

Sérignac (French pronunciation: [seʁiɲak]; Occitan: Serinhac) is a commune in the Tarn-et-Garonne department in the Occitanie region in southern France.

== See also ==
- Communes of the Tarn-et-Garonne department
