= Pommevic =

- Commune
- Coat of arms
- Location of Pommevic
- Location within France Location within Occitanie
- Coordinates: 44°06′03″N 0°56′04″E
- Country: France
- Region: Occitania
- Department: Tarn-et-Garonne
- Arrondissement: Castelsarrasin
- Canton: Valence
- Intercommunality: Deux Rives

Government
  - Mayor (2020–2026): Jean-Paul Delachoux
- Area^{1}: 5.75 km^{2} (2.22 sq mi)
- Elevation: 71 m (233 ft)
- Highest elevation: 77 m (253 ft)
- Lowest elevation: 57 m (187 ft)
- Population (2023): 599
  - Density: 104/km^{2} (270/sq mi)
- Time zone: UTC+01:00 (CET)
  - Summer (DST): UTC+02:00 (CEST)
- INSEE/Postal code: 82141 /82400
- ^{1} French Land Register data, which excludes lakes, ponds, glaciers > 1 km^{2} (0.386 sq mi or 247 acres) and river estuaries.

Pommevic (French pronunciation: [pɔmvik]; Occitan: Pomavic) is a commune in the Tarn-et-Garonne department in the Occitania region in southern France.

== See also ==
- Communes of the Tarn-et-Garonne department
