= Larrazet =

- Commune
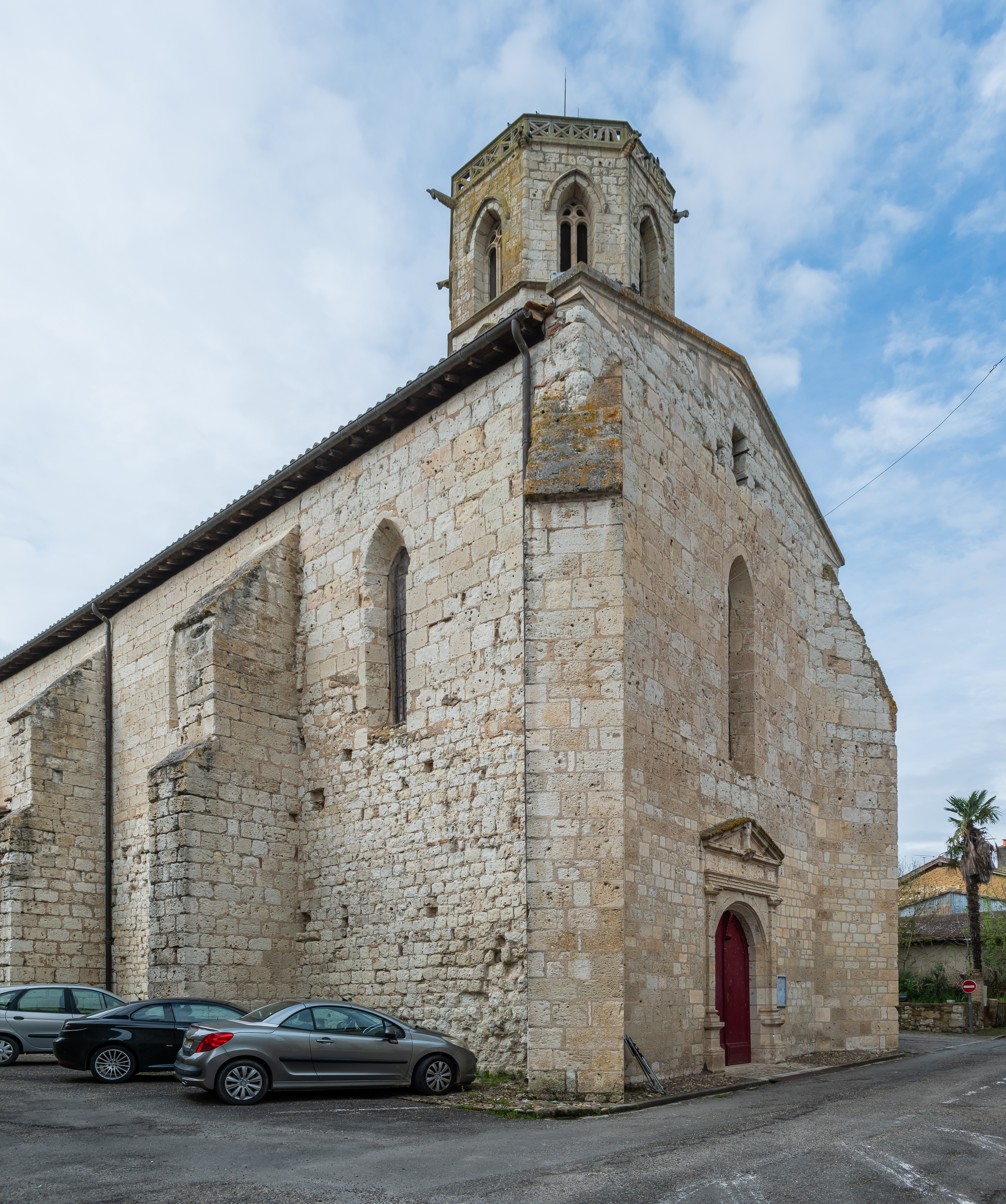
- The church of Sainte-Marie-Madeleine, in Larrazet

- Coat of arms
- Location of Larrazet
- Location within France Location within Occitanie
- Coordinates: 43°55′55″N 1°05′00″E
- Country: France
- Region: Occitania
- Department: Tarn-et-Garonne
- Arrondissement: Castelsarrasin
- Canton: Beaumont-de-Lomagne
- Intercommunality: Lomagne Tarn-et-Garonnaise

Government
  - Mayor (2020–2026): Jean-Louis Coureau
- Area^{1}: 14.91 km^{2} (5.76 sq mi)
- Elevation: 81 m (266 ft)
- Highest elevation: 187 m (614 ft)
- Lowest elevation: 85 m (279 ft)
- Population (2023): 678
  - Density: 45.5/km^{2} (118/sq mi)
- Time zone: UTC+01:00 (CET)
  - Summer (DST): UTC+02:00 (CEST)
- INSEE/Postal code: 82093 /82500
- ^{1} French Land Register data, which excludes lakes, ponds, glaciers > 1 km^{2} (0.386 sq mi or 247 acres) and river estuaries.

Larrazet (French pronunciation: [laʁazɛ]; Occitan: L'Arraset) is a commune in the Tarn-et-Garonne department in the Occitanie region in southern France. The village has bastide character, with its old half-timbered houses and wooden frames, its narrow streets, its remains of ramparts and the arch of the old gate of the barbican.

In the 17th century, Johan de Cardailhac, abbot of Belleperche Abbey, ordered the construction of a church, flanked by a majestic hexagonal bell tower, as well as a massive stone bridge which today no longer exists. The Eglise Sainte Marie-Madeleine, the church of Larrazet has a single nave, with a square sanctuary. It is built entirely of ashlar from local quarries. Theis stems from the need to use churches as a place of refuge during the French Wars of Religion; it was necessary to remove sills and ledges, which would have provided a somewhat daring assailant with climbing facilities. Above the entrance door is a broken statue, which was to represent the Virgin holding the child Jesus. At the base one can make out flamboyant patterns.

== See also ==
- Communes of the Tarn-et-Garonne department
