= Le Causé =

- Commune
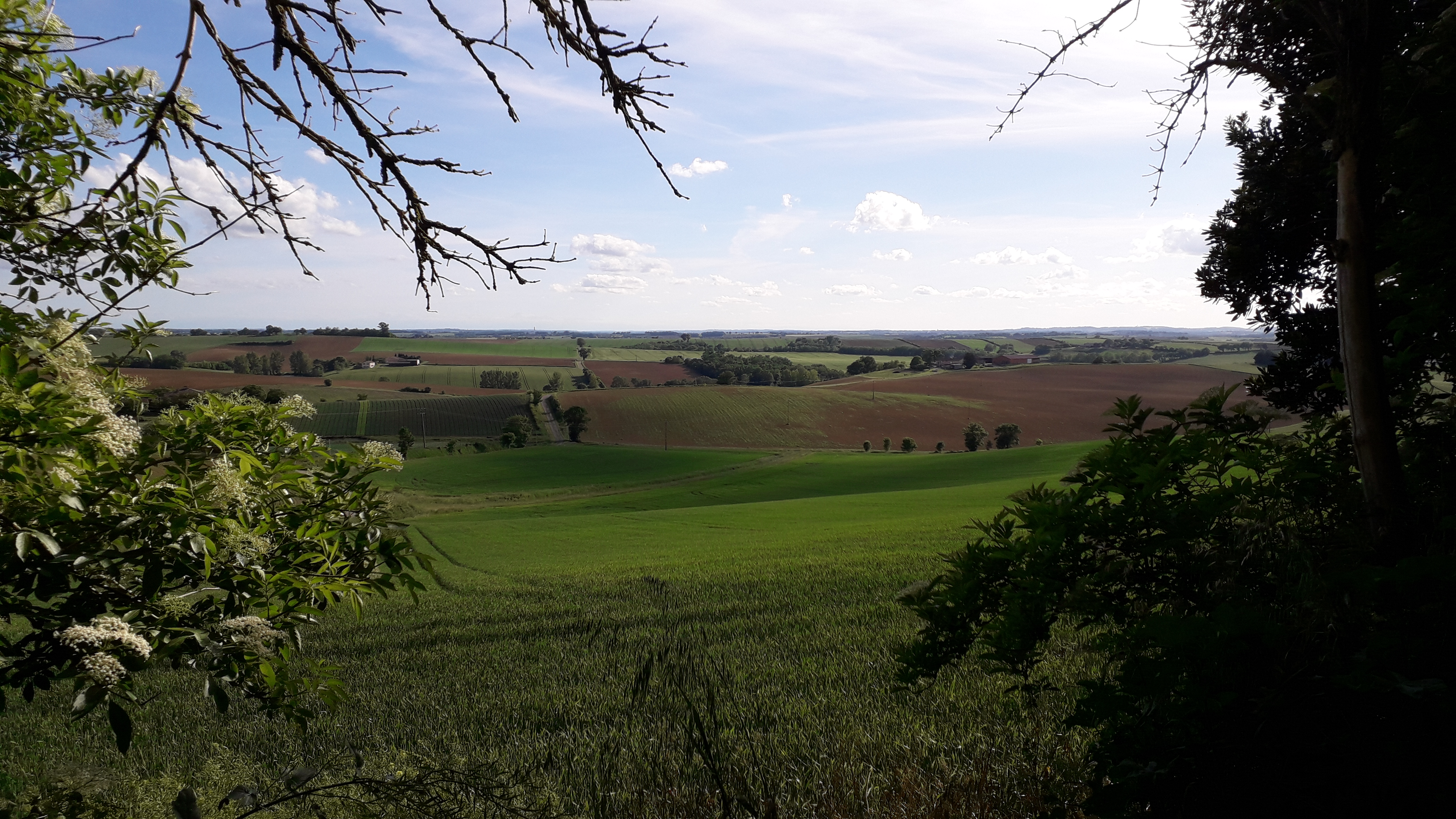
- Location of Le Causé
- Location within France Location within Occitanie
- Coordinates: 43°48′07″N 0°58′12″E
- Country: France
- Region: Occitania
- Department: Tarn-et-Garonne
- Arrondissement: Castelsarrasin
- Canton: Beaumont-de-Lomagne
- Intercommunality: Lomagne Tarn-et-Garonnaise

Government
  - Mayor (2020–2026): Jean-Michel Lefebvre
- Area^{1}: 9.32 km^{2} (3.60 sq mi)
- Elevation: 236 m (774 ft)
- Highest elevation: 278 m (912 ft)
- Lowest elevation: 125 m (410 ft)
- Population (2023): 131
  - Density: 14.1/km^{2} (36.4/sq mi)
- Time zone: UTC+01:00 (CET)
  - Summer (DST): UTC+02:00 (CEST)
- INSEE/Postal code: 82036 /82500
- ^{1} French Land Register data, which excludes lakes, ponds, glaciers > 1 km^{2} (0.386 sq mi or 247 acres) and river estuaries.

Le Causé (French pronunciation: [lə koze]; Occitan: Le Cause) is a commune in the Tarn-et-Garonne department in the Occitanie region in southern France.

== See also ==
- Communes of the Tarn-et-Garonne department
