= Espalais =

- Commune
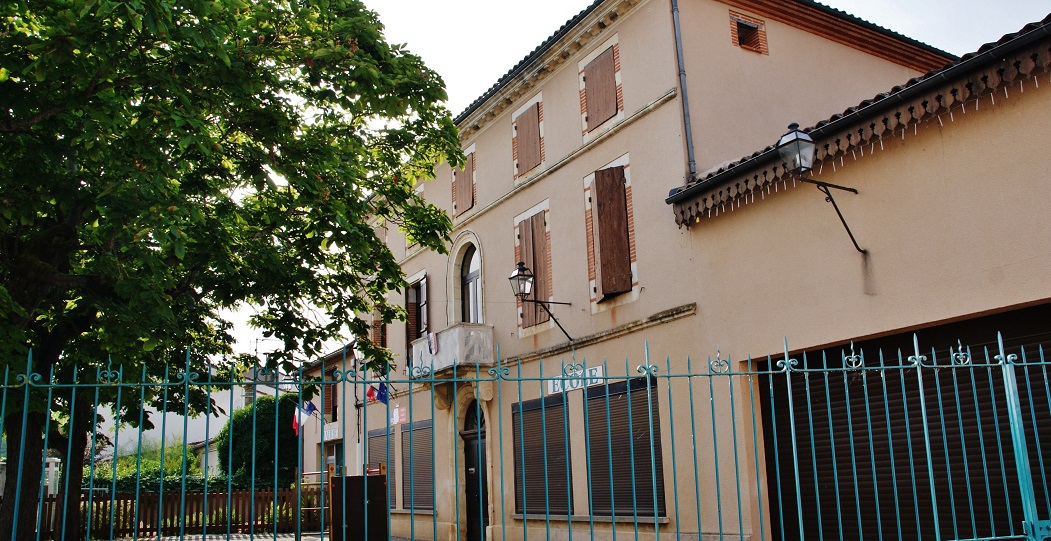
- Town hall

- Coat of arms
- Location of Espalais
- Location within France Location within Occitanie
- Coordinates: 44°04′38″N 0°54′14″E
- Country: France
- Region: Occitania
- Department: Tarn-et-Garonne
- Arrondissement: Castelsarrasin
- Canton: Valence
- Intercommunality: Deux Rives

Government
  - Mayor (2023–2026): Bernard Pincemin
- Area^{1}: 7.87 km^{2} (3.04 sq mi)
- Elevation: 62 m (203 ft)
- Highest elevation: 70 m (230 ft)
- Lowest elevation: 52 m (171 ft)
- Population (2023): 373
  - Density: 47.4/km^{2} (123/sq mi)
- Time zone: UTC+01:00 (CET)
  - Summer (DST): UTC+02:00 (CEST)
- INSEE/Postal code: 82054 /82400
- ^{1} French Land Register data, which excludes lakes, ponds, glaciers > 1 km^{2} (0.386 sq mi or 247 acres) and river estuaries.

Espalais (French pronunciation: [ɛspalɛ]) is a commune in the Tarn-et-Garonne department in the Occitanie region in southern France.

== See also ==
- Communes of the Tarn-et-Garonne department
