= Belbèze-en-Lomagne =

- Commune
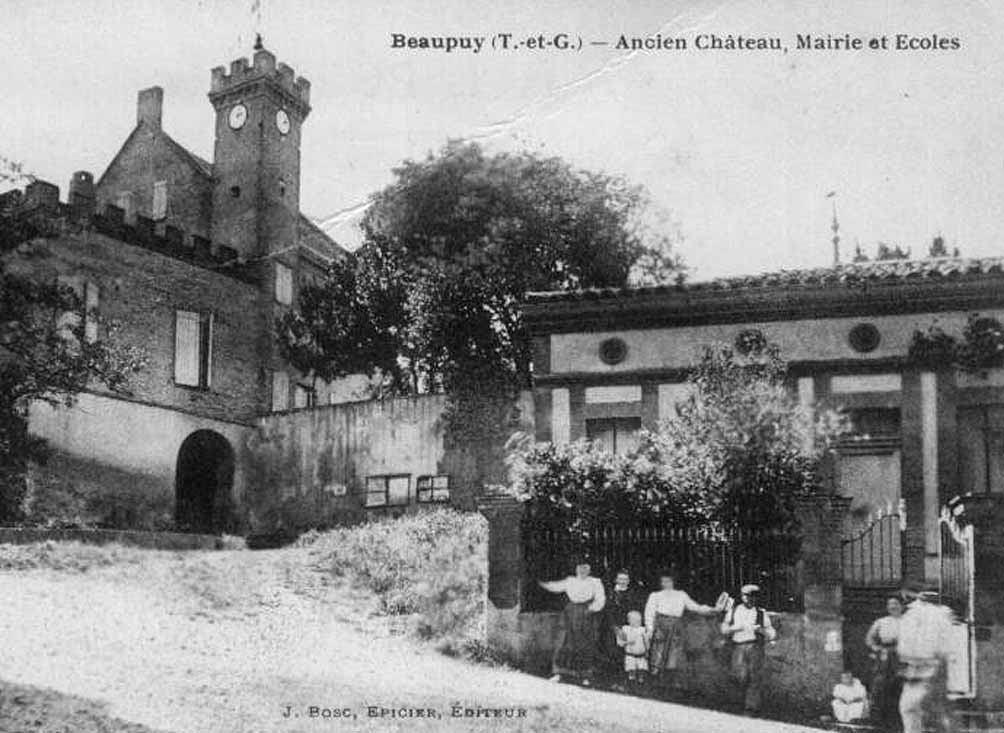
- Location of Belbèze-en-Lomagne
- Location within France Location within Occitanie
- Coordinates: 43°54′09″N 1°04′16″E
- Country: France
- Region: Occitania
- Department: Tarn-et-Garonne
- Arrondissement: Castelsarrasin
- Canton: Beaumont-de-Lomagne
- Intercommunality: Lomagne Tarn-et-Garonnaise

Government
  - Mayor (2020–2026): Jean-Luc Issanchou
- Area^{1}: 3.65 km^{2} (1.41 sq mi)
- Elevation: 169 m (554 ft)
- Highest elevation: 208 m (682 ft)
- Lowest elevation: 94 m (308 ft)
- Population (2023): 172
  - Density: 47.1/km^{2} (122/sq mi)
- Time zone: UTC+01:00 (CET)
  - Summer (DST): UTC+02:00 (CEST)
- INSEE/Postal code: 82015 /82500
- ^{1} French Land Register data, which excludes lakes, ponds, glaciers > 1 km^{2} (0.386 sq mi or 247 acres) and river estuaries.

Belbèze-en-Lomagne (French pronunciation: [bɛlbɛz ɑ̃ lɔmaɲ]; before 2014: Belbèse; Occitan: Bèthvéser) is a commune in the Tarn-et-Garonne department in the Occitanie region in southern France.

== See also ==
- Communes of the Tarn-et-Garonne department
