= Canton of Castelsarrasin-1 =

Coordinates: 44°02′31″N 1°06′32″E

The Canton of Castelsarrasin-1 was one of the 12 cantons of the arrondissement of Castelsarrasin, in the Tarn-et-Garonne department, in southern France. It had 6,299 inhabitants (2012). It was disbanded following the French canton reorganisation which came into effect in March 2015. It consisted of part of the commune of Castelsarrasin, which joined the new canton of Castelsarrasin in 2015.
