= Vigueron =

- Commune
- Location of Vigueron
- Location within France Location within Occitanie
- Coordinates: 43°53′07″N 1°03′22″E
- Country: France
- Region: Occitania
- Department: Tarn-et-Garonne
- Arrondissement: Castelsarrasin
- Canton: Beaumont-de-Lomagne
- Intercommunality: Lomagne Tarn-et-Garonnaise

Government
  - Mayor (2020–2026): Pierrette Gallina
- Area^{1}: 6.33 km^{2} (2.44 sq mi)
- Elevation: 220 m (720 ft)
- Highest elevation: 232 m (761 ft)
- Lowest elevation: 96 m (315 ft)
- Population (2023): 112
  - Density: 17.7/km^{2} (45.8/sq mi)
- Time zone: UTC+01:00 (CET)
  - Summer (DST): UTC+02:00 (CEST)
- INSEE/Postal code: 82193 /82500
- ^{1} French Land Register data, which excludes lakes, ponds, glaciers > 1 km^{2} (0.386 sq mi or 247 acres) and river estuaries.

Vigueron (French pronunciation: [viɡʁɔ̃]; Occitan: Vigaron) is a commune in the Tarn-et-Garonne department in the Occitanie region in southern France.

== See also ==
- Communes of the Tarn-et-Garonne department
