= Escazeaux =

- Commune
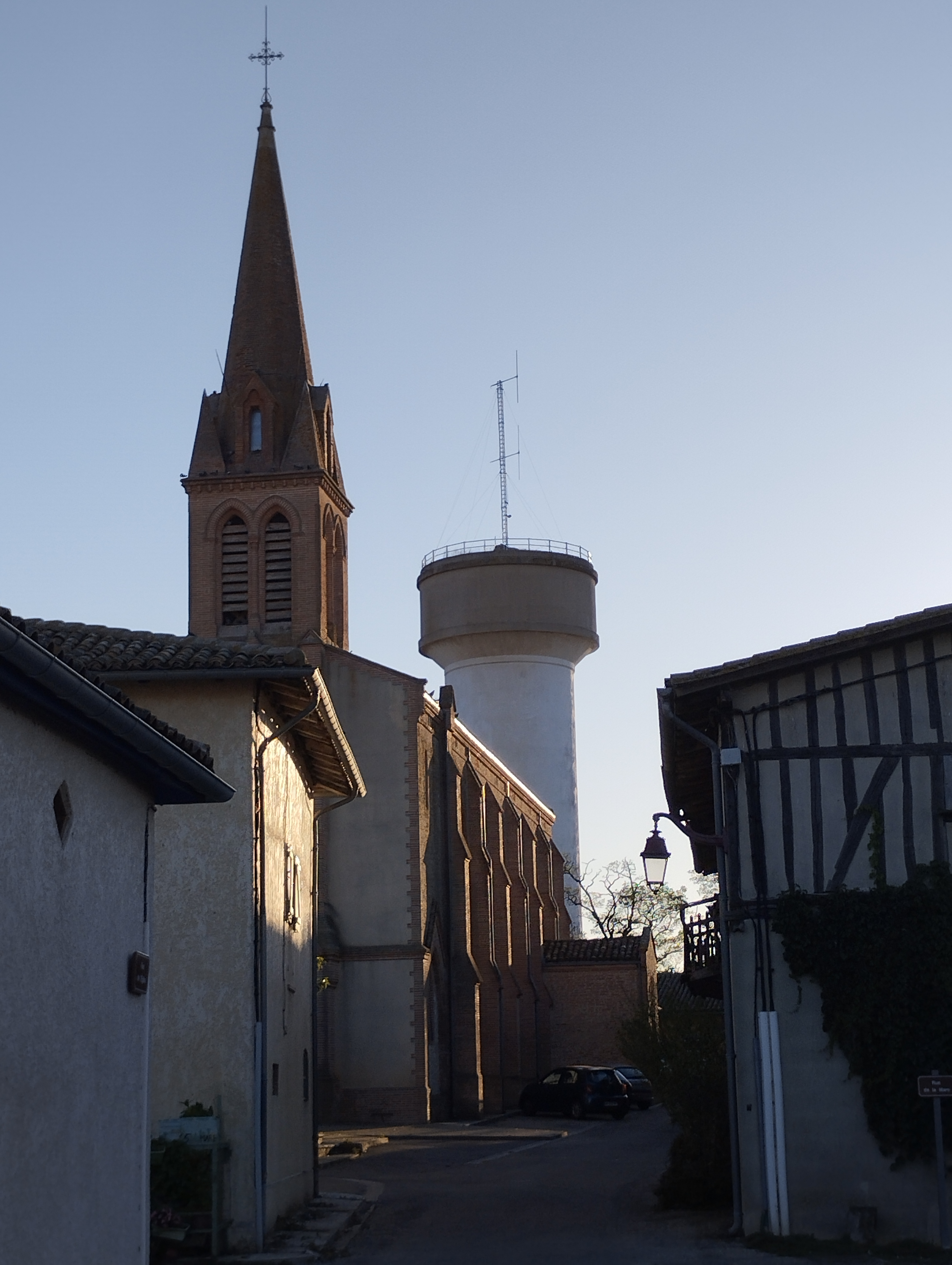
- Location of Escazeaux
- Location within France Location within Occitanie
- Coordinates: 43°50′10″N 1°01′24″E
- Country: France
- Region: Occitania
- Department: Tarn-et-Garonne
- Arrondissement: Castelsarrasin
- Canton: Beaumont-de-Lomagne
- Intercommunality: Lomagne Tarn-et-Garonnaise

Government
  - Mayor (2020–2026): Gérard Latapie
- Area^{1}: 16.05 km^{2} (6.20 sq mi)
- Elevation: 260 m (850 ft)
- Highest elevation: 268 m (879 ft)
- Lowest elevation: 126 m (413 ft)
- Population (2023): 287
  - Density: 17.9/km^{2} (46.3/sq mi)
- Time zone: UTC+01:00 (CET)
  - Summer (DST): UTC+02:00 (CEST)
- INSEE/Postal code: 82053 /82500
- ^{1} French Land Register data, which excludes lakes, ponds, glaciers > 1 km^{2} (0.386 sq mi or 247 acres) and river estuaries.

Escazeaux (French pronunciation: [ɛskazo]; Occitan: Escasaus) is a commune in the Tarn-et-Garonne department in the Occitanie region in southern France.

== See also ==
- Communes of the Tarn-et-Garonne department
