= Tréjouls =

- Commune
- Location of Tréjouls
- Location within France Location within Occitanie
- Coordinates: 44°16′06″N 1°14′11″E
- Country: France
- Region: Occitania
- Department: Tarn-et-Garonne
- Arrondissement: Castelsarrasin
- Canton: Pays de Serres Sud-Quercy

Government
  - Mayor (2020–2026): Véronique Bessieres
- Area^{1}: 13.86 km^{2} (5.35 sq mi)
- Elevation: 234 m (768 ft)
- Highest elevation: 255 m (837 ft)
- Lowest elevation: 111 m (364 ft)
- Population (2023): 214
  - Density: 15.4/km^{2} (40.0/sq mi)
- Time zone: UTC+01:00 (CET)
  - Summer (DST): UTC+02:00 (CEST)
- INSEE/Postal code: 82183 /82110
- ^{1} French Land Register data, which excludes lakes, ponds, glaciers > 1 km^{2} (0.386 sq mi or 247 acres) and river estuaries.

Tréjouls (French pronunciation: [tʁeʒul]; Languedocien: Truèjols) is a commune in the Tarn-et-Garonne department in the Occitanie region in southern France.

== Geography ==
The Barguelonne flows southwest through the commune.

== See also ==
- Communes of the Tarn-et-Garonne department
