= Glatens =

- Commune
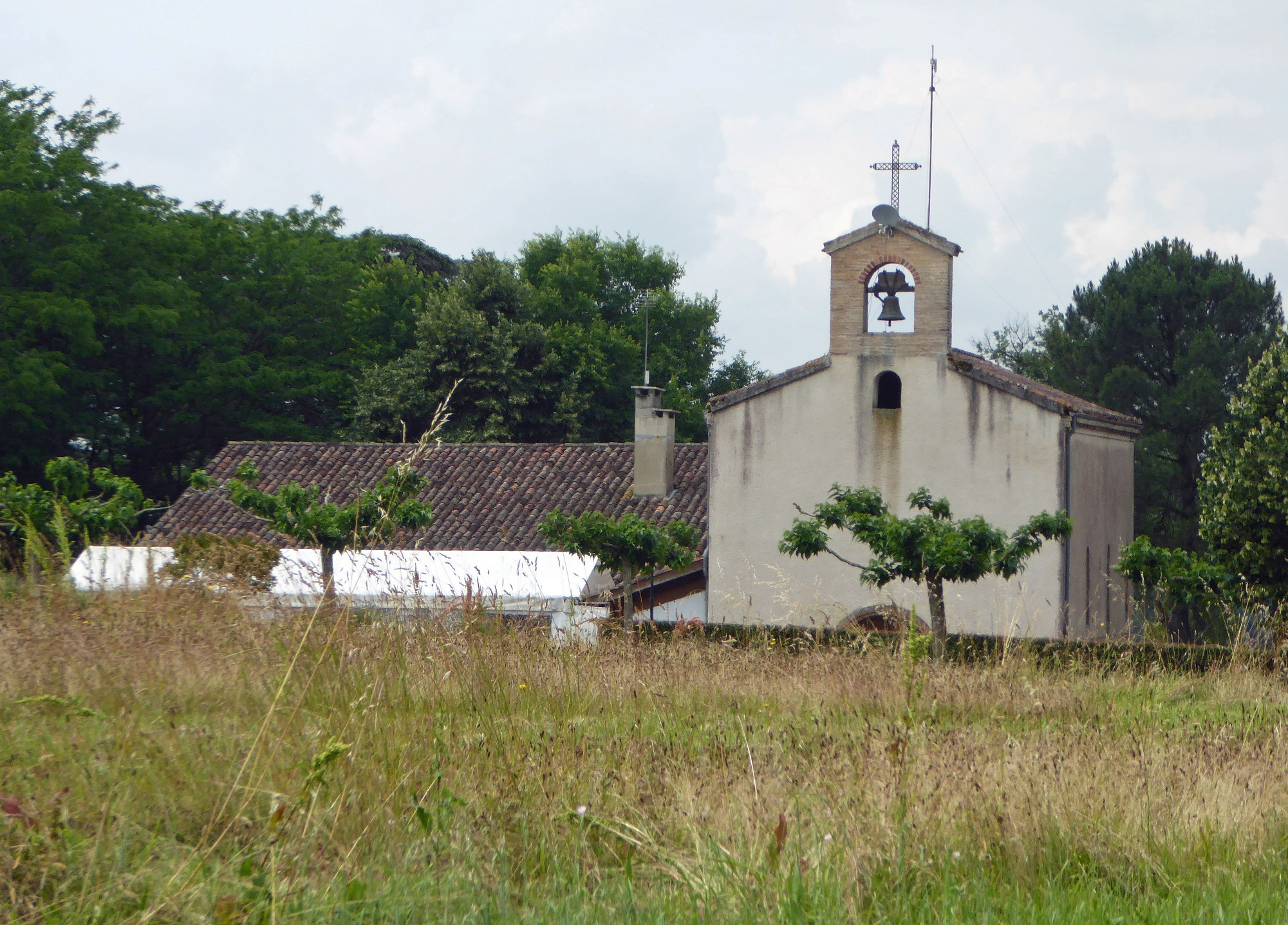
- Location of Glatens
- Location within France Location within Occitanie
- Coordinates: 43°53′40″N 0°55′05″E
- Country: France
- Region: Occitania
- Department: Tarn-et-Garonne
- Arrondissement: Castelsarrasin
- Canton: Beaumont-de-Lomagne
- Intercommunality: Lomagne Tarn-et-Garonnaise

Government
  - Mayor (2020–2026): Claude Renard
- Area^{1}: 2.31 km^{2} (0.89 sq mi)
- Elevation: 240 m (790 ft)
- Highest elevation: 255 m (837 ft)
- Lowest elevation: 133 m (436 ft)
- Population (2023): 68
  - Density: 29/km^{2} (76/sq mi)
- Time zone: UTC+01:00 (CET)
  - Summer (DST): UTC+02:00 (CEST)
- INSEE/Postal code: 82070 /82500
- ^{1} French Land Register data, which excludes lakes, ponds, glaciers > 1 km^{2} (0.386 sq mi or 247 acres) and river estuaries.

Glatens is a commune in the Tarn-et-Garonne department in the Occitanie region in southern France.

== See also ==
- Communes of the Tarn-et-Garonne department
