= Lizac =

- Commune
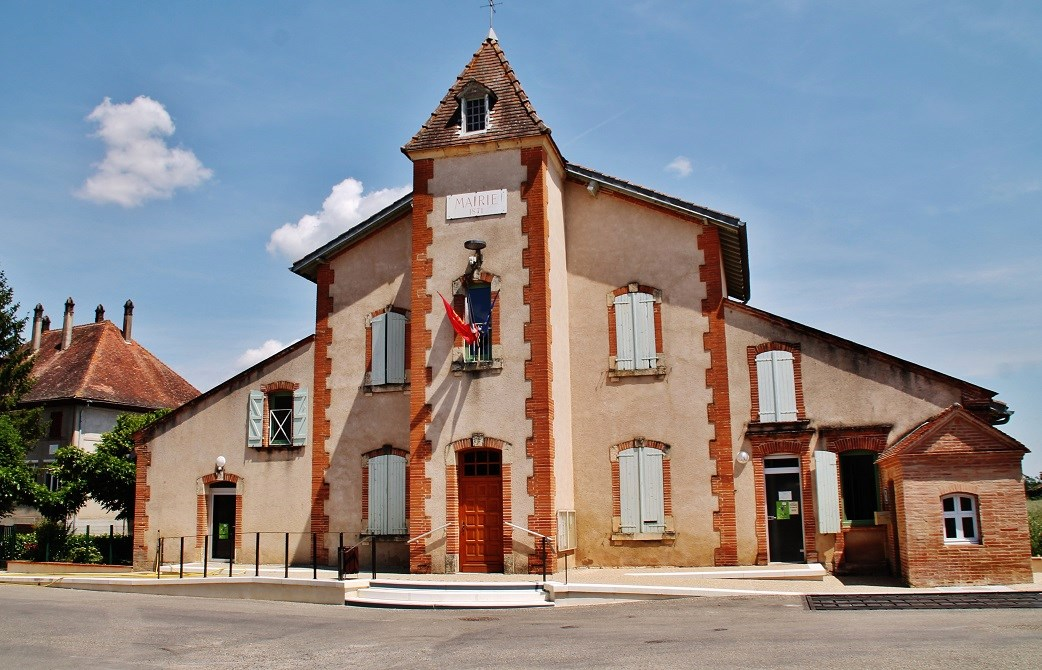
- Town hall
- Location of Lizac
- Location within France Location within Occitanie
- Coordinates: 44°06′22″N 1°11′15″E
- Country: France
- Region: Occitania
- Department: Tarn-et-Garonne
- Arrondissement: Castelsarrasin
- Canton: Moissac

Government
  - Mayor (2020–2026): Bernard Garguy
- Area^{1}: 9.42 km^{2} (3.64 sq mi)
- Elevation: 71 m (233 ft)
- Highest elevation: 168 m (551 ft)
- Lowest elevation: 63 m (207 ft)
- Population (2023): 543
  - Density: 57.6/km^{2} (149/sq mi)
- Time zone: UTC+01:00 (CET)
  - Summer (DST): UTC+02:00 (CEST)
- INSEE/Postal code: 82099 /82200
- ^{1} French Land Register data, which excludes lakes, ponds, glaciers > 1 km^{2} (0.386 sq mi or 247 acres) and river estuaries.

Lizac (French pronunciation: [lizak]; Occitan: Lisac) is a commune in the Tarn-et-Garonne department in the Occitanie region in southern France.

== See also ==
- Communes of the Tarn-et-Garonne department
