= Gimat =

- Commune
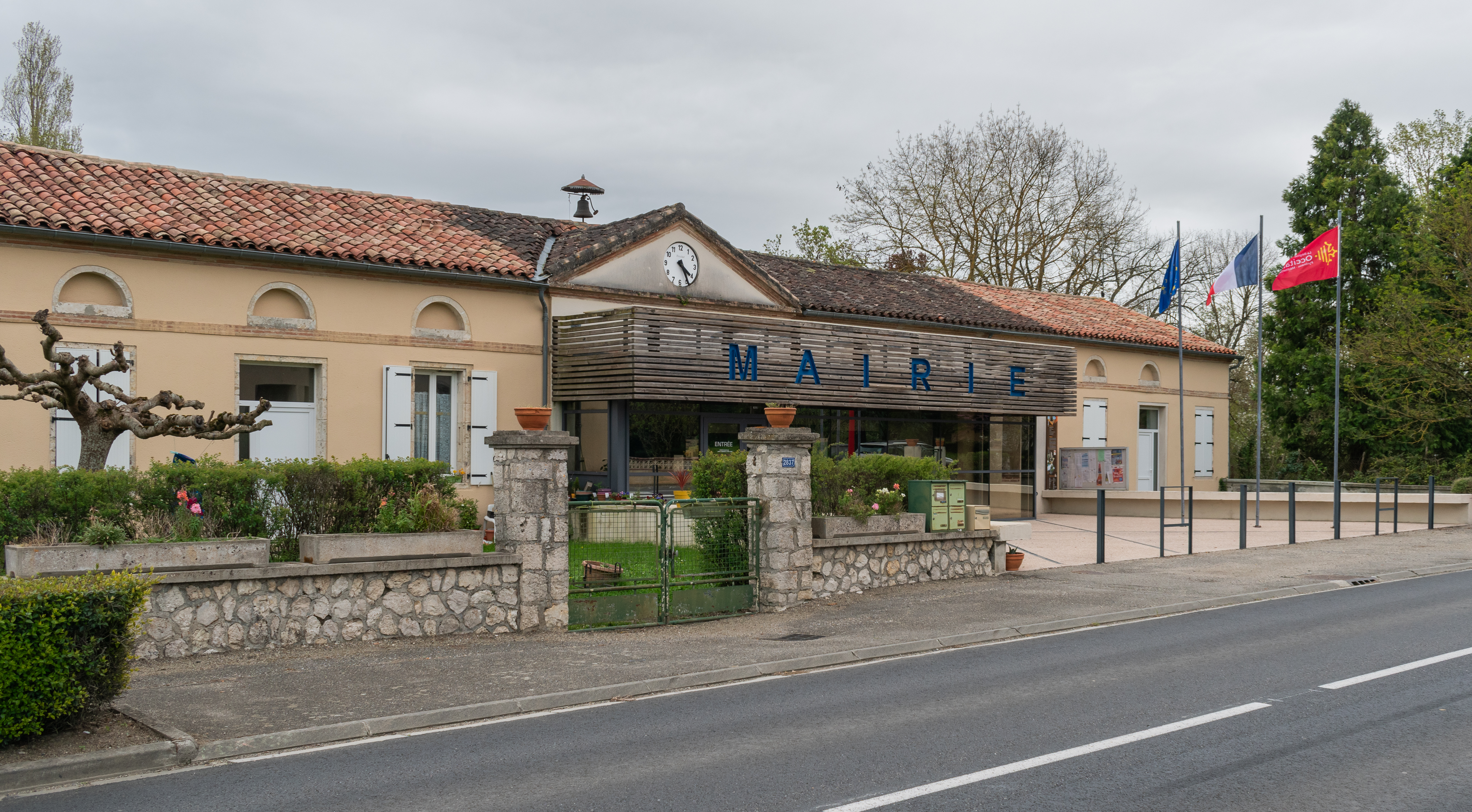
- Town hall of Gimat
- Location of Gimat
- Location within France Location within Occitanie
- Coordinates: 43°51′10″N 0°56′36″E
- Country: France
- Region: Occitania
- Department: Tarn-et-Garonne
- Arrondissement: Castelsarrasin
- Canton: Beaumont-de-Lomagne
- Intercommunality: Lomagne Tarn-et-Garonnaise

Government
  - Mayor (2020–2026): Bernard Diana
- Area^{1}: 10.1 km^{2} (3.9 sq mi)
- Elevation: 110 m (360 ft)
- Highest elevation: 202 m (663 ft)
- Lowest elevation: 106 m (348 ft)
- Population (2023): 213
  - Density: 21.1/km^{2} (54.6/sq mi)
- Time zone: UTC+01:00 (CET)
  - Summer (DST): UTC+02:00 (CEST)
- INSEE/Postal code: 82068 /82500
- ^{1} French Land Register data, which excludes lakes, ponds, glaciers > 1 km^{2} (0.386 sq mi or 247 acres) and river estuaries.

Gimat (French pronunciation: [ʒimat]) is a commune in the Tarn-et-Garonne department in the Occitanie region in southern France.

== See also ==
- Communes of the Tarn-et-Garonne department
