= Communes of the Tarn-et-Garonne department =

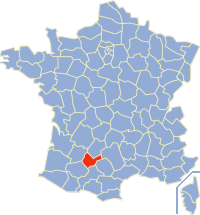

The following is a list of the 195 communes of the Tarn-et-Garonne department of France.

The communes cooperate in the following intercommunalities (as of 2025):

- Communauté d'agglomération Grand Montauban
- Communauté de communes des Deux Rives (partly)
- Communauté de communes Grand Sud Tarn-et-Garonne
- Communauté de communes de la Lomagne Tarn-et-Garonnaise
- Communauté de communes du Pays de Lafrançaise
- Communauté de communes du Pays de Serres en Quercy
- Communauté de communes du Quercy Caussadais
- Communauté de communes du Quercy Rouergue et des gorges de l'Aveyron (partly)
- Communauté de communes Quercy Vert-Aveyron
- Communauté de communes Terres des Confluences

INSEE code	Postal code	Commune
82001	82290	Albefeuille-Lagarde
82002	82350	Albias
82003	82210	Angeville
82004	82120	Asques
82005	82600	Aucamville
82006	82500	Auterive
82007	82220	Auty
82008	82340	Auvillar
82009	82120	Balignac
82010	82340	Bardigues
82011	82290	Barry-d'Islemade
82012	82100	Les Barthes
82013	82500	Beaumont-de-Lomagne
82014	82600	Beaupuy
82015	82500	Belbèze-en-Lomagne
82016	82150	Belvèze
82017	82170	Bessens
82018	82800	Bioule
82019	82200	Boudou
82020	82600	Bouillac
82021	82110	Bouloc-en-Quercy
82022	82190	Bourg-de-Visa
82023	82700	Bourret
82024	82190	Brassac
82025	82710	Bressols
82026	82800	Bruniquel
82027	82370	Campsas
82028	82170	Canals
82029	82160	Castanet
82030	82100	Castelferrus
82031	82210	Castelmayran
82032	82400	Castelsagrat
82033	82100	Castelsarrasin
82034	82120	Castéra-Bouzet
82035	82210	Caumont
82036	82500	Le Causé
82037	82300	Caussade
82038	82160	Caylus
82039	82440	Cayrac
82040	82240	Cayriech
82041	82140	Cazals
82042	82110	Cazes-Mondenard
82043	82600	Comberouger
82044	82370	Corbarieu
82045	82700	Cordes-Tolosannes
82046	82210	Coutures
82047	82500	Cumont
82048	82170	Dieupentale
82049	82340	Donzac
82050	82340	Dunes
82051	82390	Durfort-Lacapelette
82052	82700	Escatalens
82053	82500	Escazeaux
82054	82400	Espalais
82055	82500	Esparsac
82056	82160	Espinas
82057	82170	Fabas
82058	82210	Fajolles
82059	82500	Faudoas
82060	82190	Fauroux
82061	82140	Féneyrols
82062	82700	Finhan
82063	82100	Garganvillar
82064	82500	Gariès
82065	82400	Gasques
82066	82230	Génébrières
82067	82120	Gensac
82068	82500	Gimat
82069	82330	Ginals
82070	82500	Glatens
82071	82500	Goas
82072	82400	Golfech
82073	82400	Goudourville
82074	82120	Gramont
82075	82170	Grisolles
82076	82130	L'Honor-de-Cos
82077	82220	Labarthe
82078	82240	Labastide-de-Penne
82080	82100	Labastide-du-Temple
82079	82370	Labastide-Saint-Pierre
82081	82100	Labourgade
82082	82160	Lacapelle-Livron
82083	82120	Lachapelle
82084	82190	Lacour
82085	82290	Lacourt-Saint-Pierre
82086	82100	Lafitte
82087	82130	Lafrançaise
82088	82250	Laguépie
82089	82360	Lamagistère
82090	82130	Lamothe-Capdeville
82091	82500	Lamothe-Cumont
82092	82240	Lapenche
82093	82500	Larrazet
82094	82110	Lauzerte
82095	82240	Lavaurette
82097	82120	Lavit
82098	82230	Léojac

INSEE code	Postal code	Commune
82099	82200	Lizac
82100	82160	Loze
82101	82200	Malause
82102	82120	Mansonville
82103	82500	Marignac
82104	82120	Marsac
82105	82600	Mas-Grenier
82106	82500	Maubec
82107	82120	Maumusson
82108	82290	Meauzac
82109	82210	Merles
82110	82440	Mirabel
82111	82190	Miramont-de-Quercy
82112	82200	Moissac
82113	82220	Molières
82114	82170	Monbéqui
82115	82230	Monclar-de-Quercy
82116	82110	Montagudet
82117	82150	Montaigu-de-Quercy
82118	82100	Montaïn
82119	82270	Montalzat
82120	82130	Montastruc
82121	82000	Montauban
82122	82110	Montbarla
82123	82700	Montbartier
82124	82290	Montbeton
82125	82700	Montech
82126	82300	Monteils
82127	82200	Montesquieu
82128	82270	Montfermier
82129	82120	Montgaillard
82130	82400	Montjoi
82131	82270	Montpezat-de-Quercy
82132	82800	Montricoux
82133	82160	Mouillac
82134	82800	Nègrepelisse
82135	82370	Nohic
82136	82370	Orgueil
82137	82160	Parisot
82138	82400	Perville
82139	82340	Le Pin
82140	82130	Piquecos
82141	82400	Pommevic
82142	82170	Pompignan
82143	82120	Poupas
82144	82220	Puycornet
82146	82120	Puygaillard-de-Lomagne
82145	82800	Puygaillard-de-Quercy
82147	82160	Puylagarde
82148	82240	Puylaroque
82149	82440	Réalville
82150	82370	Reyniès
82151	82150	Roquecor
82152	82100	Saint-Aignan
82154	82110	Saint-Amans-de-Pellagal
82153	82150	Saint-Amans-du-Pech
82155	82140	Saint-Antonin-Noble-Val
82156	82210	Saint-Arroumex
82157	82150	Saint-Beauzeil
82158	82340	Saint-Cirice
82159	82300	Saint-Cirq
82160	82400	Saint-Clair
82164	82110	Sainte-Juliette
82161	82410	Saint-Étienne-de-Tulmont
82162	82240	Saint-Georges
82163	82120	Saint-Jean-du-Bouzet
82165	82340	Saint-Loup
82166	82340	Saint-Michel
82167	82370	Saint-Nauphary
82168	82190	Saint-Nazaire-de-Valentane
82169	82210	Saint-Nicolas-de-la-Grave
82170	82400	Saint-Paul-d'Espis
82171	82700	Saint-Porquier
82172	82160	Saint-Projet
82173	82600	Saint-Sardos
82174	82300	Saint-Vincent-d'Autéjac
82175	82400	Saint-Vincent-Lespinasse
82176	82230	La Salvetat-Belmontet
82177	82110	Sauveterre
82178	82600	Savenès
82179	82240	Septfonds
82180	82500	Sérignac
82181	82340	Sistels
82182	82190	Touffailles
82183	82110	Tréjouls
82184	82800	Vaïssac
82185	82150	Valeilles
82186	82400	Valence
82187	82330	Varen
82188	82370	Varennes
82189	82220	Vazerac
82190	82600	Verdun-sur-Garonne
82191	82330	Verfeil
82192	82230	Verlhac-Tescou
82193	82500	Vigueron
82194	82370	Villebrumier
82096	82290	La Ville-Dieu-du-Temple
82195	82130	Villemade
