= Esparsac =

- Commune
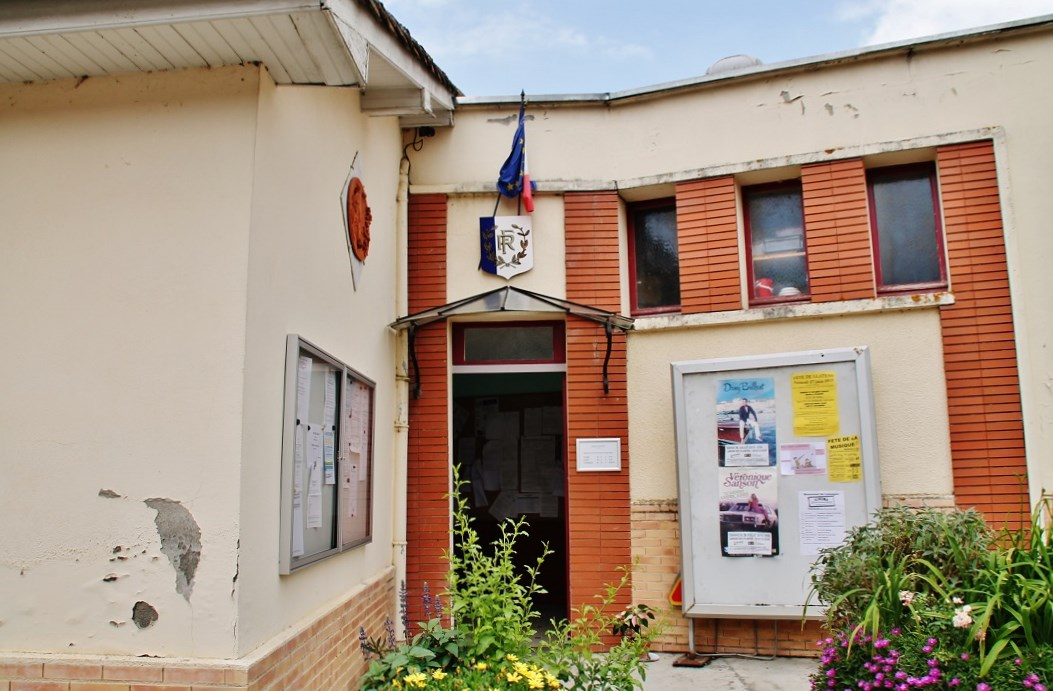
- Location of Esparsac
- Location within France Location within Occitanie
- Coordinates: 43°54′12″N 0°56′34″E
- Country: France
- Region: Occitania
- Department: Tarn-et-Garonne
- Arrondissement: Castelsarrasin
- Canton: Beaumont-de-Lomagne
- Intercommunality: Lomagne Tarn-et-Garonnaise

Government
  - Mayor (2020–2026): Annie Dupuy
- Area^{1}: 17.44 km^{2} (6.73 sq mi)
- Elevation: 250 m (820 ft)
- Highest elevation: 253 m (830 ft)
- Lowest elevation: 115 m (377 ft)
- Population (2023): 252
  - Density: 14.4/km^{2} (37.4/sq mi)
- Time zone: UTC+01:00 (CET)
  - Summer (DST): UTC+02:00 (CEST)
- INSEE/Postal code: 82055 /82500
- ^{1} French Land Register data, which excludes lakes, ponds, glaciers > 1 km^{2} (0.386 sq mi or 247 acres) and river estuaries.

Esparsac (French pronunciation: [ɛspaʁsak]) is a commune in the Tarn-et-Garonne department in the Occitanie region in southern France.

== See also ==
- Communes of the Tarn-et-Garonne department
