= Saint-Porquier =

- Commune
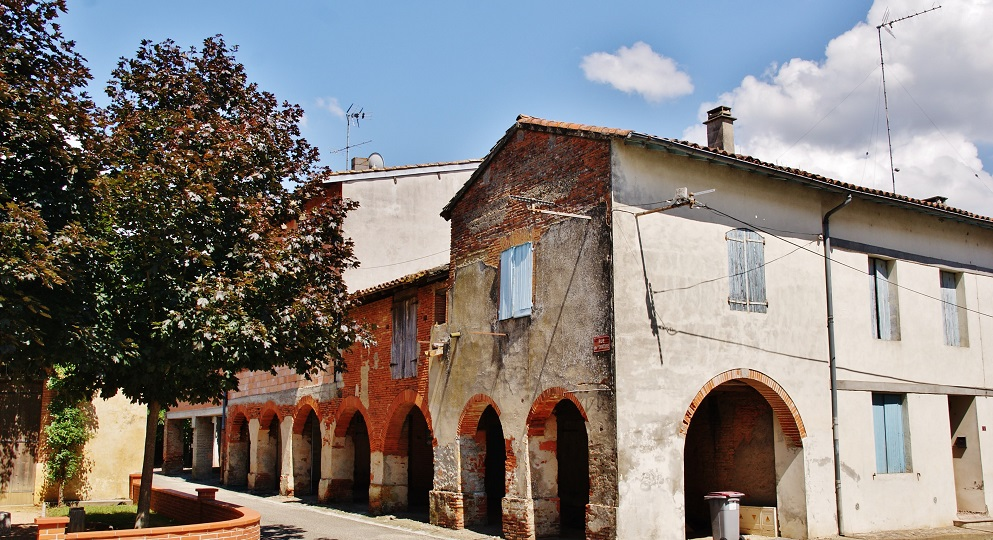

- Coat of arms
- Location of Saint-Porquier
- Location within France Location within Occitanie
- Coordinates: 44°00′20″N 1°10′41″E
- Country: France
- Region: Occitania
- Department: Tarn-et-Garonne
- Arrondissement: Montauban
- Canton: Beaumont-de-Lomagne

Government
  - Mayor (2020–2026): Xavier Prevedello
- Area^{1}: 15.7 km^{2} (6.1 sq mi)
- Elevation: 90 m (300 ft)
- Highest elevation: 101 m (331 ft)
- Lowest elevation: 73 m (240 ft)
- Population (2023): 1,326
  - Density: 84.5/km^{2} (219/sq mi)
- Time zone: UTC+01:00 (CET)
  - Summer (DST): UTC+02:00 (CEST)
- INSEE/Postal code: 82171 /82700
- ^{1} French Land Register data, which excludes lakes, ponds, glaciers > 1 km^{2} (0.386 sq mi or 247 acres) and river estuaries.

Saint-Porquier (French pronunciation: [sɛ̃ pɔʁkje]; Occitan: Sent Porquièr) is a commune in the Tarn-et-Garonne department in the Occitanie region in southern France.

== See also ==
- Communes of the Tarn-et-Garonne department
