= Gariès =

- Commune
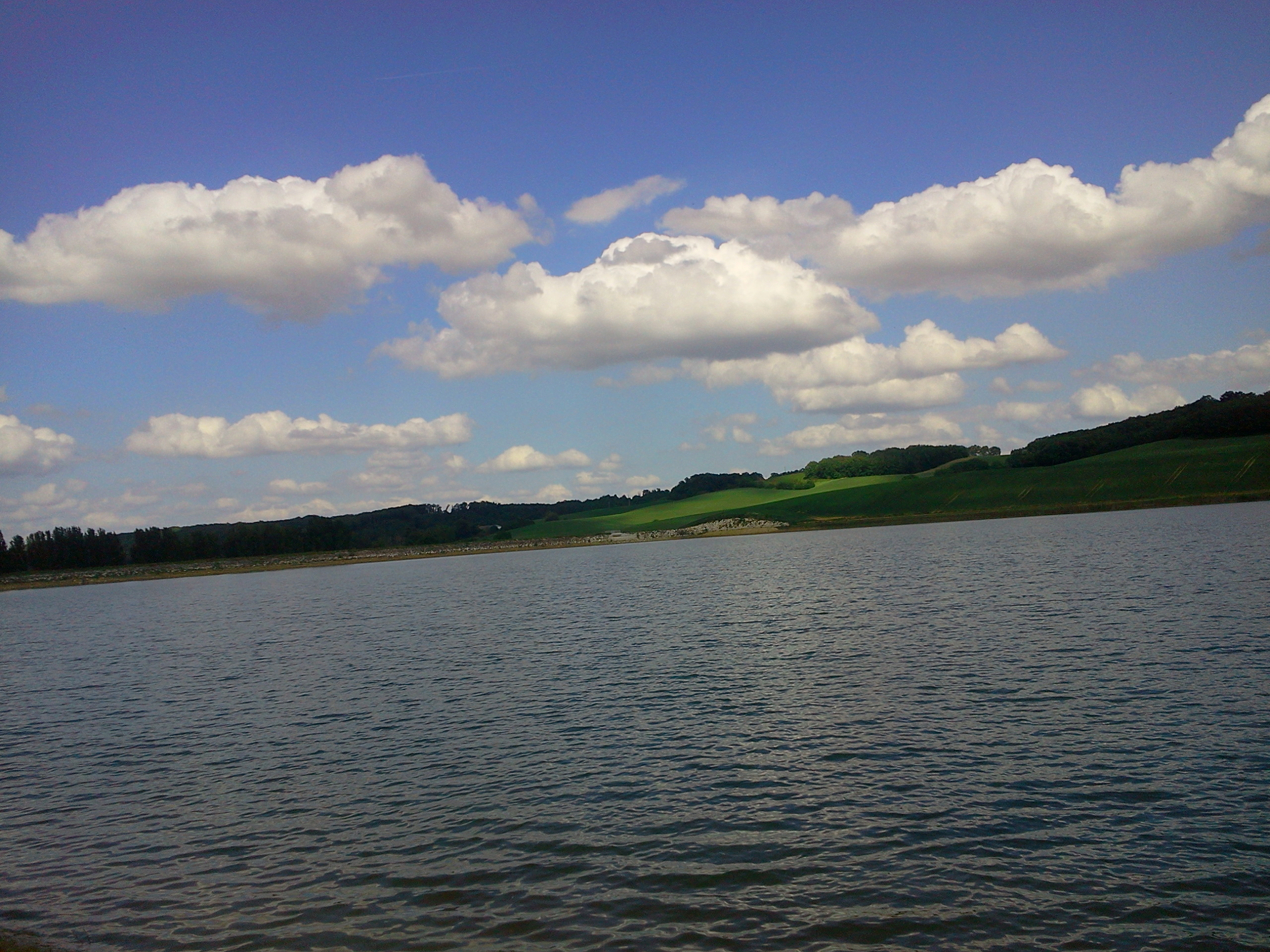
- Location of Gariès
- Location within France Location within Occitanie
- Coordinates: 43°48′25″N 1°01′54″E
- Country: France
- Region: Occitania
- Department: Tarn-et-Garonne
- Arrondissement: Castelsarrasin
- Canton: Beaumont-de-Lomagne
- Intercommunality: Lomagne Tarn-et-Garonnaise

Government
  - Mayor (2020–2026): Philippe Tonin
- Area^{1}: 14.15 km^{2} (5.46 sq mi)
- Elevation: 191 m (627 ft)
- Highest elevation: 277 m (909 ft)
- Lowest elevation: 163 m (535 ft)
- Population (2023): 129
  - Density: 9.12/km^{2} (23.6/sq mi)
- Time zone: UTC+01:00 (CET)
  - Summer (DST): UTC+02:00 (CEST)
- INSEE/Postal code: 82064 /82500
- ^{1} French Land Register data, which excludes lakes, ponds, glaciers > 1 km^{2} (0.386 sq mi or 247 acres) and river estuaries.

Gariès (French pronunciation: [ɡaʁjɛs]; Occitan: Garièrs) is a commune in the Tarn-et-Garonne department in the Occitanie region in southern France.

== See also ==
- Communes of the Tarn-et-Garonne department
