= Bourret, Tarn-et-Garonne =

Bourret
- Commune
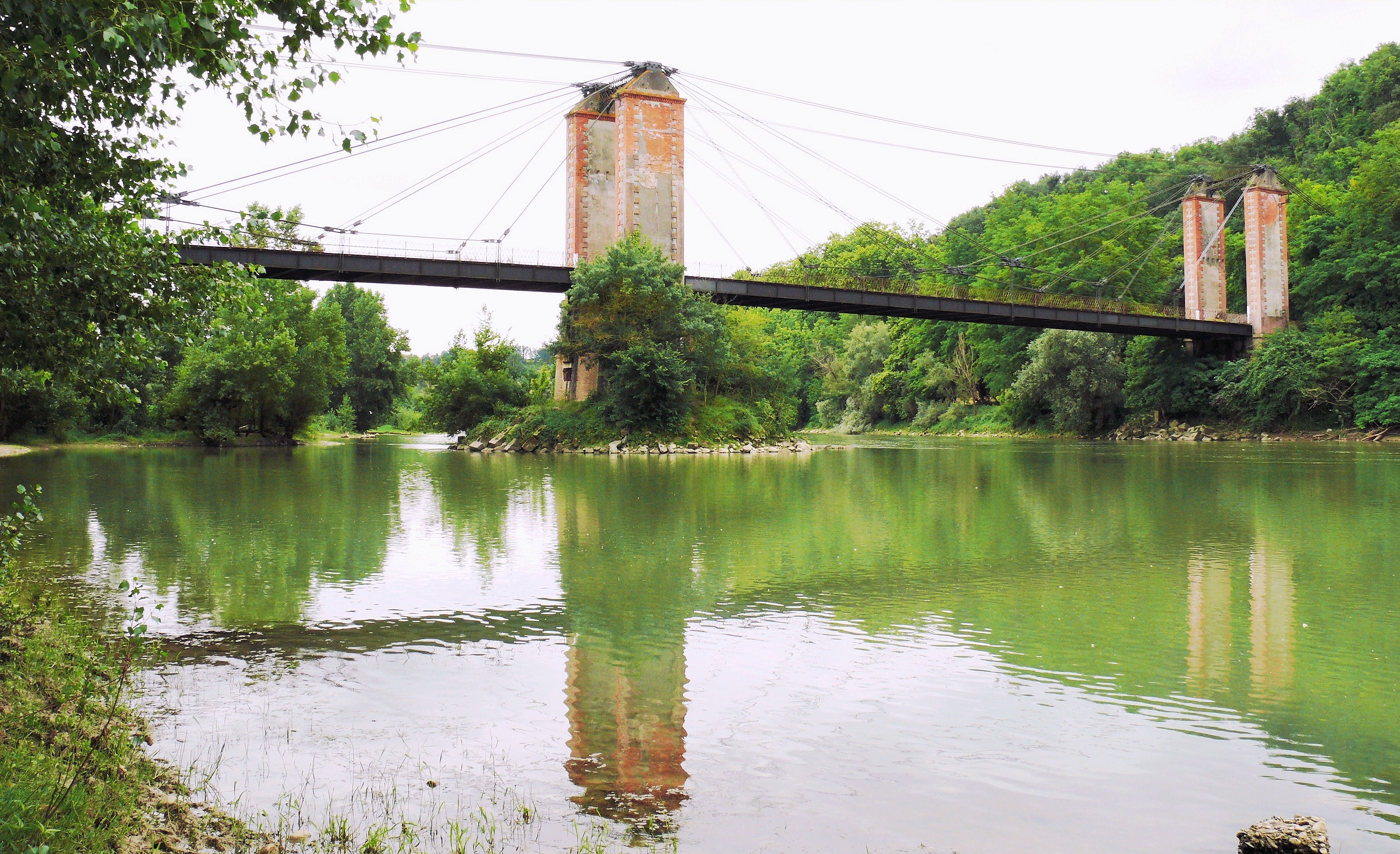
- Gisclard Bridge over the river Garonne at Bourret
- Location of Bourret
- Location within France Location within Occitanie
- Coordinates: 43°56′40″N 1°10′07″E
- Country: France
- Region: Occitania
- Department: Tarn-et-Garonne
- Arrondissement: Montauban
- Canton: Beaumont-de-Lomagne

Government
  - Mayor (2020–2026): Frédéric Ius
- Area^{1}: 16.48 km^{2} (6.36 sq mi)
- Elevation: 90 m (300 ft)
- Highest elevation: 171 m (561 ft)
- Lowest elevation: 79 m (259 ft)
- Population (2023): 971
  - Density: 58.9/km^{2} (153/sq mi)
- Time zone: UTC+01:00 (CET)
  - Summer (DST): UTC+02:00 (CEST)
- INSEE/Postal code: 82023 /82700
- ^{1} French Land Register data, which excludes lakes, ponds, glaciers > 1 km^{2} (0.386 sq mi or 247 acres) and river estuaries.

Bourret (French pronunciation: [buʁɛ]; Occitan: Borèth) is a commune in the Tarn-et-Garonne department in the Occitanie region in southern France.

== See also ==
- Communes of the Tarn-et-Garonne department
