= Maubec, Tarn-et-Garonne =

Maubec
- Commune
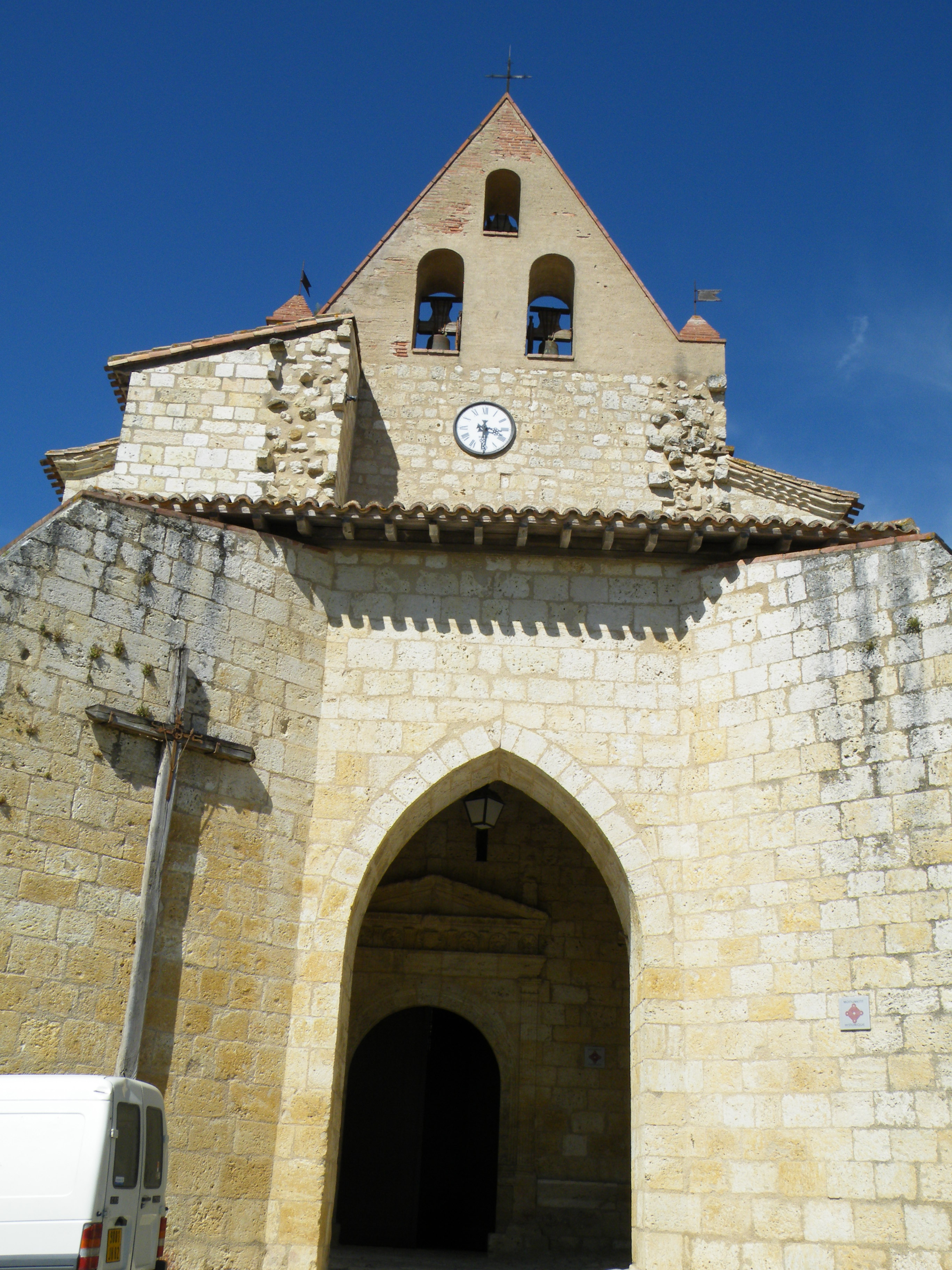
- The church of Saint-Orens, in Maubec
- Location of Maubec
- Location within France Location within Occitanie
- Coordinates: 43°48′37″N 0°55′04″E
- Country: France
- Region: Occitania
- Department: Tarn-et-Garonne
- Arrondissement: Castelsarrasin
- Canton: Beaumont-de-Lomagne

Government
  - Mayor (2020–2026): Jean-Claude Ferradou
- Area^{1}: 12.73 km^{2} (4.92 sq mi)
- Elevation: 114 m (374 ft)
- Highest elevation: 192 m (630 ft)
- Lowest elevation: 109 m (358 ft)
- Population (2023): 160
  - Density: 13/km^{2} (33/sq mi)
- Time zone: UTC+01:00 (CET)
  - Summer (DST): UTC+02:00 (CEST)
- INSEE/Postal code: 82106 /82500
- ^{1} French Land Register data, which excludes lakes, ponds, glaciers > 1 km^{2} (0.386 sq mi or 247 acres) and river estuaries.

Maubec (French pronunciation: [mobɛk]; Occitan: Maubèc) is a commune in the Tarn-et-Garonne department in the Occitanie region in southern France.

== See also ==
- Communes of the Tarn-et-Garonne department
