= Fajolles =

- Commune
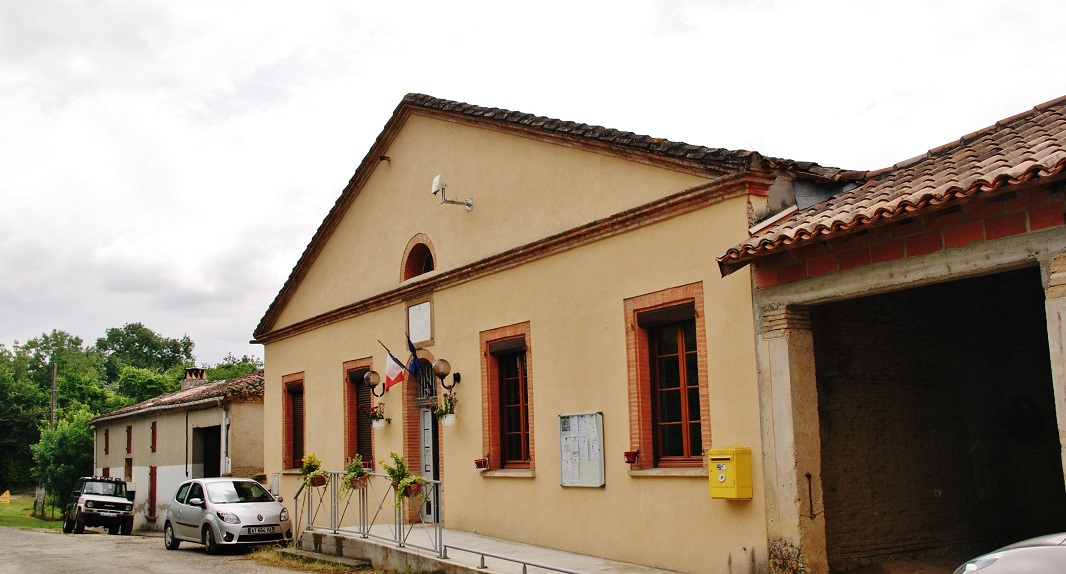
- Location of Fajolles
- Location within France Location within Occitanie
- Coordinates: 43°58′07″N 1°00′53″E
- Country: France
- Region: Occitania
- Department: Tarn-et-Garonne
- Arrondissement: Castelsarrasin
- Canton: Beaumont-de-Lomagne

Government
  - Mayor (2023–2026): Nadine Légal
- Area^{1}: 9.32 km^{2} (3.60 sq mi)
- Elevation: 163 m (535 ft)
- Highest elevation: 186 m (610 ft)
- Lowest elevation: 99 m (325 ft)
- Population (2023): 113
  - Density: 12.1/km^{2} (31.4/sq mi)
- Time zone: UTC+01:00 (CET)
  - Summer (DST): UTC+02:00 (CEST)
- INSEE/Postal code: 82058 /82210
- ^{1} French Land Register data, which excludes lakes, ponds, glaciers > 1 km^{2} (0.386 sq mi or 247 acres) and river estuaries.

Fajolles (French pronunciation: [faʒɔl]; Occitan: Fajòlas) is a commune in the Tarn-et-Garonne department in the Occitanie region in southern France.

== See also ==
- Communes of the Tarn-et-Garonne department
