= Saint-Arroumex =

- Commune
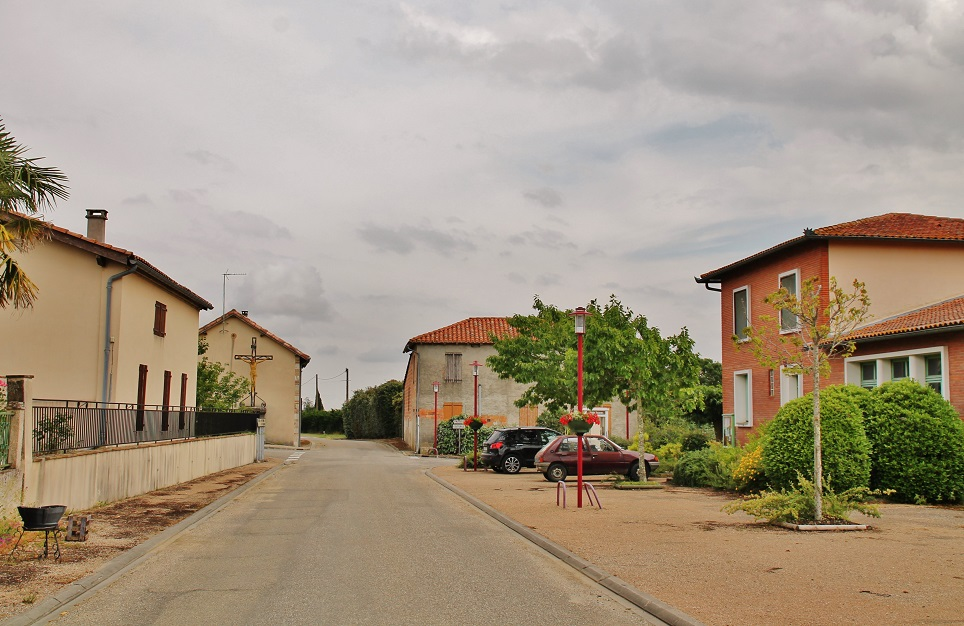
- Location of Saint-Arroumex
- Location within France Location within Occitanie
- Coordinates: 43°59′36″N 0°59′51″E
- Country: France
- Region: Occitania
- Department: Tarn-et-Garonne
- Arrondissement: Castelsarrasin
- Canton: Beaumont-de-Lomagne

Government
  - Mayor (2020–2026): Jacques Bras
- Area^{1}: 9.63 km^{2} (3.72 sq mi)
- Elevation: 153 m (502 ft)
- Highest elevation: 172 m (564 ft)
- Lowest elevation: 90 m (300 ft)
- Population (2023): 145
  - Density: 15.1/km^{2} (39.0/sq mi)
- Time zone: UTC+01:00 (CET)
  - Summer (DST): UTC+02:00 (CEST)
- INSEE/Postal code: 82156 /82210
- ^{1} French Land Register data, which excludes lakes, ponds, glaciers > 1 km^{2} (0.386 sq mi or 247 acres) and river estuaries.

Saint-Arroumex is a commune in the Tarn-et-Garonne department in the Occitanie region in southern France.

== See also ==
- Communes of the Tarn-et-Garonne department
