= Labourgade =

- Commune
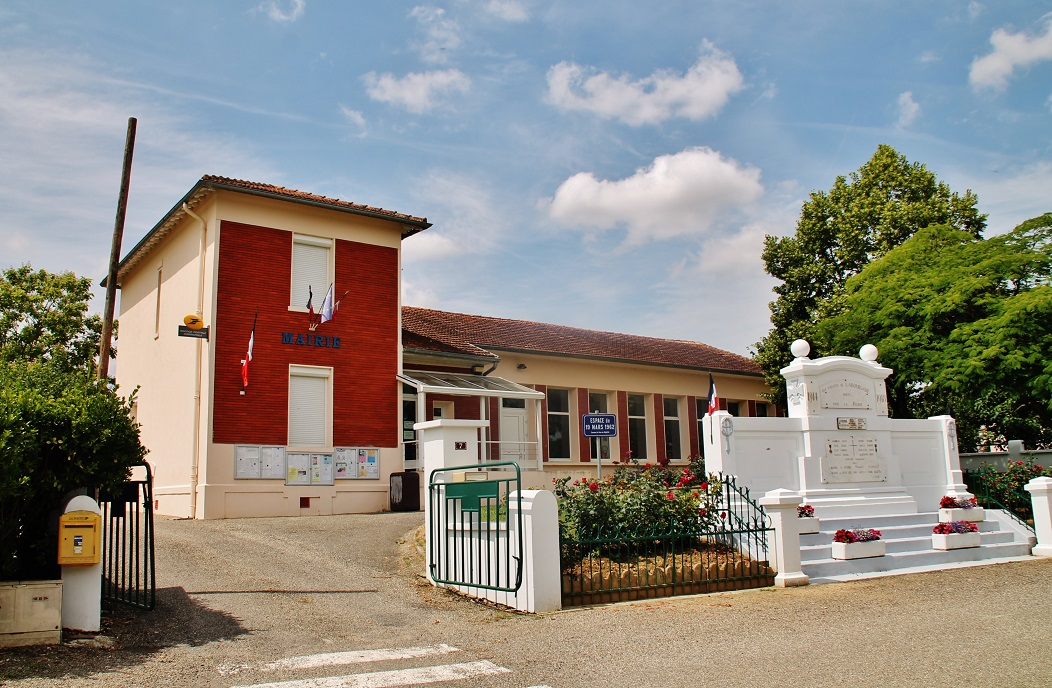
- Location of Labourgade
- Location within France Location within Occitanie
- Coordinates: 43°57′02″N 1°06′07″E
- Country: France
- Region: Occitania
- Department: Tarn-et-Garonne
- Arrondissement: Castelsarrasin
- Canton: Beaumont-de-Lomagne

Government
  - Mayor (2020–2026): Hugues Samain
- Area^{1}: 5.49 km^{2} (2.12 sq mi)
- Elevation: 95 m (312 ft)
- Highest elevation: 171 m (561 ft)
- Lowest elevation: 85 m (279 ft)
- Population (2023): 163
  - Density: 29.7/km^{2} (76.9/sq mi)
- Time zone: UTC+01:00 (CET)
  - Summer (DST): UTC+02:00 (CEST)
- INSEE/Postal code: 82081 /82100
- ^{1} French Land Register data, which excludes lakes, ponds, glaciers > 1 km^{2} (0.386 sq mi or 247 acres) and river estuaries.

Labourgade (French pronunciation: [labuʁɡad]; Occitan: La Borgada) is a commune in the Tarn-et-Garonne department in the Occitanie region in southern France.

== See also ==
- Communes of the Tarn-et-Garonne department
