= Angeville =

- Commune
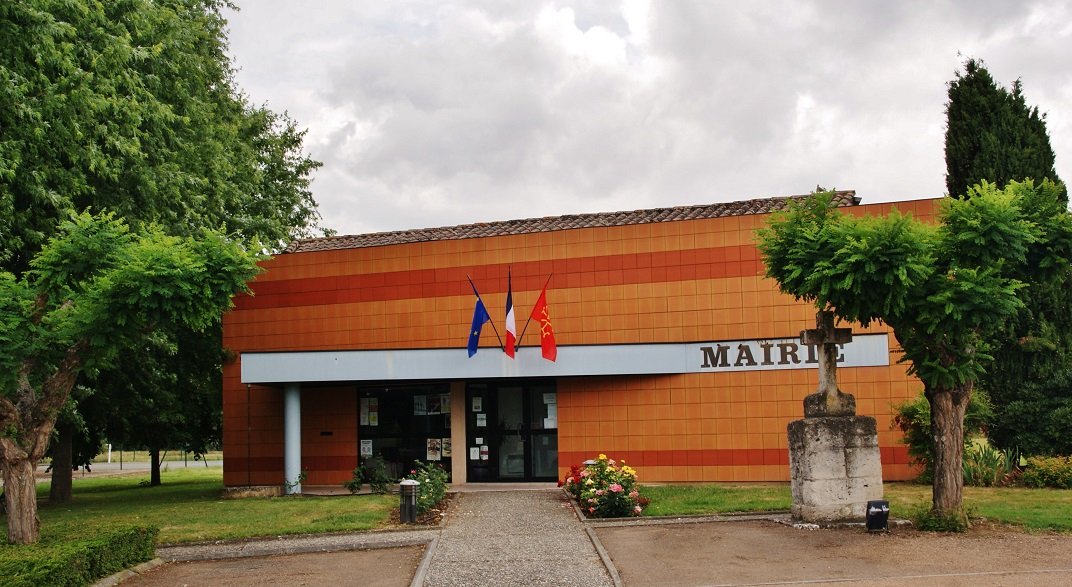
- Location of Angeville
- Location within France Location within Occitanie
- Coordinates: 44°00′03″N 1°01′41″E
- Country: France
- Region: Occitania
- Department: Tarn-et-Garonne
- Arrondissement: Castelsarrasin
- Canton: Beaumont-de-Lomagne
- Intercommunality: CC Terres des Confluences

Government
  - Mayor (2020–2026): Jean-Luc Crubilé
- Area^{1}: 8.33 km^{2} (3.22 sq mi)
- Elevation: 142 m (466 ft)
- Highest elevation: 163 m (535 ft)
- Lowest elevation: 87 m (285 ft)
- Population (2023): 239
  - Density: 28.7/km^{2} (74.3/sq mi)
- Time zone: UTC+01:00 (CET)
  - Summer (DST): UTC+02:00 (CEST)
- INSEE/Postal code: 82003 /82210
- ^{1} French Land Register data, which excludes lakes, ponds, glaciers > 1 km^{2} (0.386 sq mi or 247 acres) and river estuaries.

Angeville (French pronunciation: [ɑ̃ʒvil]; Occitan: Angevila) is a commune in the Tarn-et-Garonne department in the Occitania region in southern France.

== Geography ==
The commune lies on the Sère.

== Demography ==
Residents are called Angevillois in French.

Historical population
Year	Pop.	±% p.a.
1968	157	—
1975	133	−2.34%
1982	138	+0.53%
1990	165	+2.26%
1999	169	+0.27%
2007	194	+1.74%
2012	218	+2.36%
2017	242	+2.11%
2023	239	−0.21%
Source: INSEE

== See also ==
- Communes of the Tarn-et-Garonne department
