= Cordes-Tolosannes =

- Commune
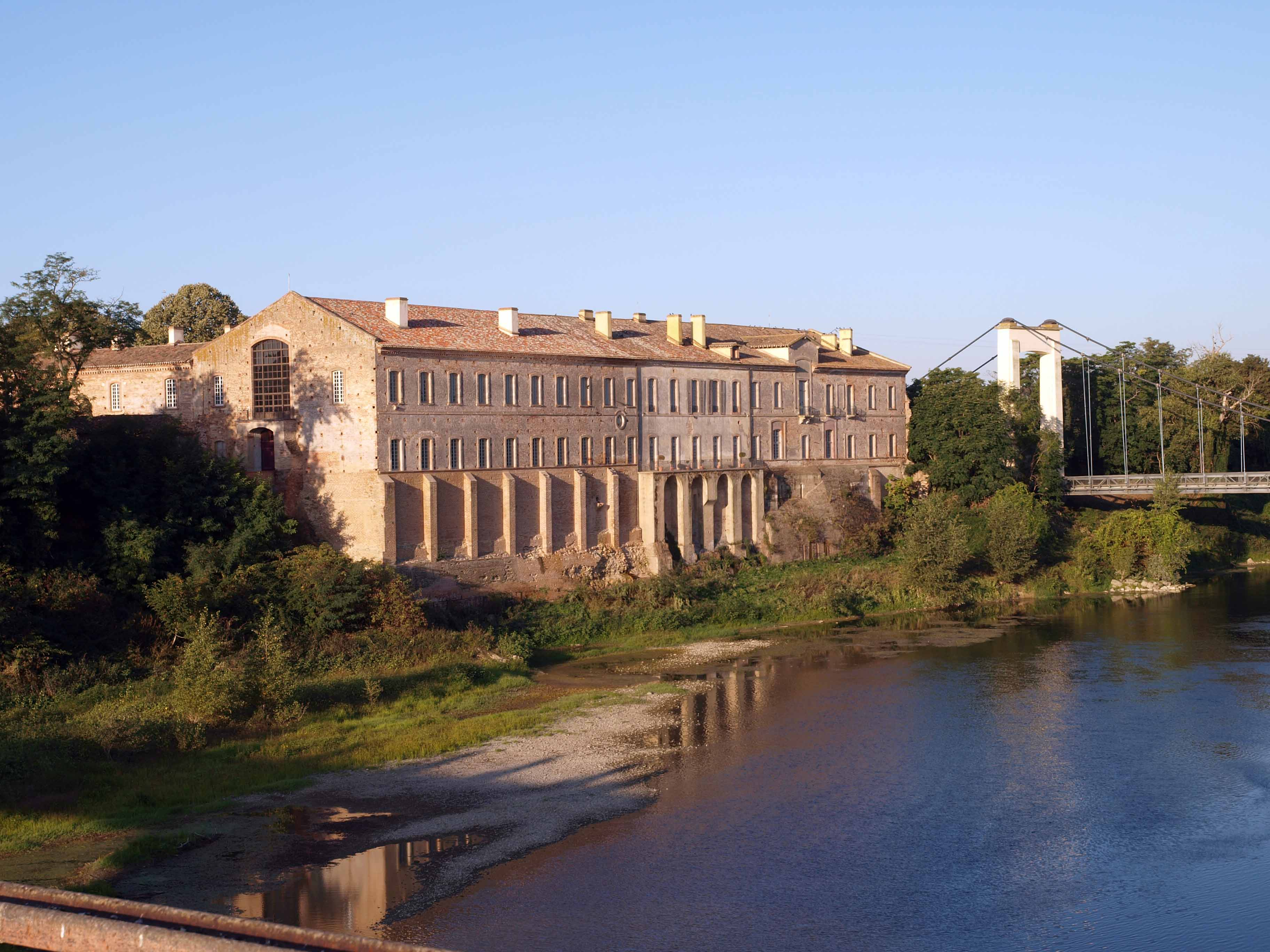
- Belleperche Abbey, in Cordes-Tolosannes
- Location of Cordes-Tolosannes
- Location within France Location within Occitanie
- Coordinates: 43°59′12″N 1°08′58″E
- Country: France
- Region: Occitania
- Department: Tarn-et-Garonne
- Arrondissement: Castelsarrasin
- Canton: Beaumont-de-Lomagne

Government
  - Mayor (2020–2026): Patrick Dellac
- Area^{1}: 15.77 km^{2} (6.09 sq mi)
- Elevation: 156 m (512 ft)
- Highest elevation: 164 m (538 ft)
- Lowest elevation: 74 m (243 ft)
- Population (2023): 357
  - Density: 22.6/km^{2} (58.6/sq mi)
- Time zone: UTC+01:00 (CET)
  - Summer (DST): UTC+02:00 (CEST)
- INSEE/Postal code: 82045 /82700
- ^{1} French Land Register data, which excludes lakes, ponds, glaciers > 1 km^{2} (0.386 sq mi or 247 acres) and river estuaries.

Cordes-Tolosannes (French pronunciation: [kɔʁd tɔlozan]; Occitan: Còrdas) is a commune in the Tarn-et-Garonne department in the Occitanie region in southern France.

== See also ==
- Communes of the Tarn-et-Garonne department
