= Canton of Beaumont-de-Lomagne =

Coordinates: 43°51′47″N 0°58′38″E

Beaumont-de-Lomagne
- Canton
- Interactive map of Beaumont-de-Lomagne
- Country: France
- Region: Occitania
- Department: Tarn-et-Garonne
- No. of communes: {{{nbcomm}}}
- Area: 386.01 km^{2} (149.04 sq mi)
- Population (2023): 13,531
  - Density: 35.053/km^{2} (90.788/sq mi)
- INSEE code: 8202

The canton of Beaumont-de-Lomagne is a French administrative division in the department of Tarn-et-Garonne and region Occitanie.

== Communes ==
At the French canton reorganisation which came into effect in March 2015, the canton was expanded from 18 to 32 communes:

- Angeville
- Auterive
- Beaumont-de-Lomagne
- Belbèze-en-Lomagne
- Bourret
- Castelferrus
- Le Causé
- Comberouger
- Cordes-Tolosannes
- Coutures
- Cumont
- Escatalens
- Escazeaux
- Esparsac
- Fajolles
- Faudoas
- Garganvillar
- Gariès
- Gimat
- Glatens
- Goas
- Labourgade
- Lafitte
- Lamothe-Cumont
- Larrazet
- Marignac
- Maubec
- Montaïn
- Saint-Arroumex
- Saint-Porquier
- Sérignac
- Vigueron
