= Lafitte, Tarn-et-Garonne =

Lafitte
- Commune
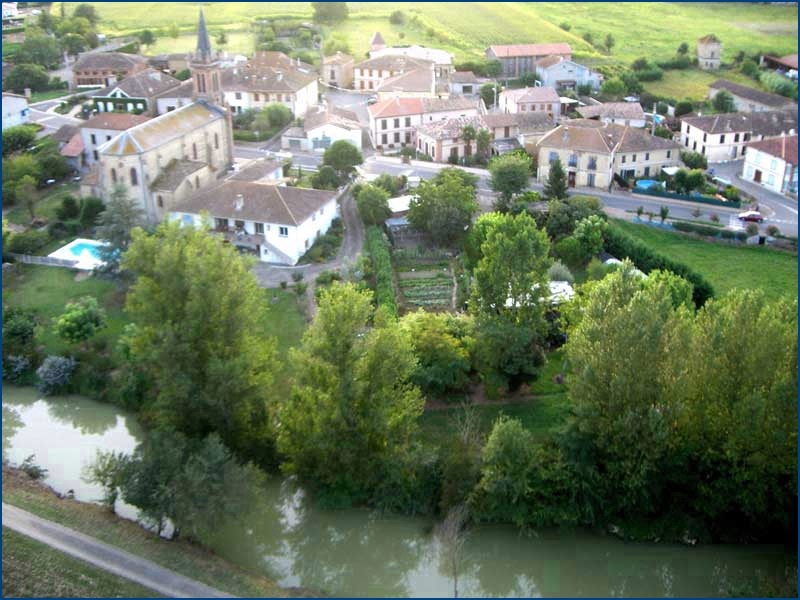
- Aerial view of central Lafitte
- Location of Lafitte
- Location within France Location within Occitanie
- Coordinates: 43°58′20″N 1°07′13″E
- Country: France
- Region: Occitania
- Department: Tarn-et-Garonne
- Arrondissement: Castelsarrasin
- Canton: Beaumont-de-Lomagne
- Intercommunality: Terres des Confluences

Government
  - Mayor (2024–2026): Nathalie Aubry
- Area^{1}: 4.74 km^{2} (1.83 sq mi)
- Elevation: 87 m (285 ft)
- Highest elevation: 159 m (522 ft)
- Lowest elevation: 76 m (249 ft)
- Population (2023): 235
  - Density: 49.6/km^{2} (128/sq mi)
- Time zone: UTC+01:00 (CET)
  - Summer (DST): UTC+02:00 (CEST)
- INSEE/Postal code: 82086 /82100
- ^{1} French Land Register data, which excludes lakes, ponds, glaciers > 1 km^{2} (0.386 sq mi or 247 acres) and river estuaries.

Lafitte (French pronunciation: [lafit]; Occitan: La Fita) is a commune in the Tarn-et-Garonne department in the Occitanie region in southern France.

Its inhabitants are called Lafittois.

== Geography ==
Town located along the main road 14 between Castelsarrasin, and Beaumont-de-Lomagne.

== History ==
The history of this quoted is linked to its origin to religion as we can apprehend below in the excerpt from the dictionary of Parishes of Pierre Gayne in 1978.

LAFITTE evokes these stones "stuck in the ground, or standing stones, prehistoric monuments, including the religious significance is unknown. Was there in this place a menhir Christianized thereafter to give birth to a chapel dedicated to St. John the Baptist?

It would be hard to say. Anyway, the parish has been mentioned since the late 12th century under the name of St. Jean of Montanhac, and was assigned as her neighbors in the 13th century by the Bishop of Toulouse in the monastery Belleperche; the Father held until the Revolution the right of patronage and shared the tithes with the priest who was receiving a pension minimum. It was sometimes combined with that of Cordes-Tolosannes, including the 16th century. Suppressed by the Concordat of 1801 and then attached to Labourgade, it was restored by an imperial decree in 1812 after a petition from the inhabitants. Its population has declined steadily, as elsewhere in rural areas, since the middle of last century, however, there was a resident priest until 1967.

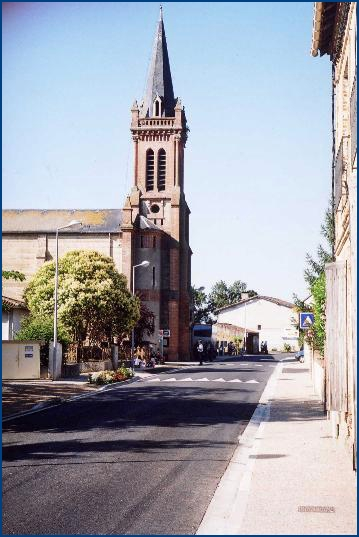
Lafitte church

The church once stood in the cemetery, roughly equidistant from the various hamlets of the commune. The choice of location fell on the village of Lafitte, more important than others and with the school already, but the rivalries of the various sections prevented, despite the urgency of the project.

In 1867 local residents chosen by subscription only did the cost of a new church, where Mass was celebrated for the first time in January 1870, the Sunday of the Epiphany. This was for several years the cause of great excitement in the parish, including a significant portion long refused to recognize their new church and to attend religious services. Finally, the old church Montanhac, struck first with a forbidden, then lost his title church was demolished by order prefecture in 1882, and accepted that of Lafitte in 1885 as communal property. In 1899, when the divisions ceased, the tower was built. This church, like the old, the word's Beheading of St. John the Baptist. It is Gothic Revival, the square tower is damped by an arrow in frame covered with slates. From a former altar in gilded wood, 18th century, there are only two life-size statues: St. Helena (mother of Constantine) and Saint Francis de Sales.

== See also ==
- Communes of the Tarn-et-Garonne department
