= Garganvillar =

- Commune
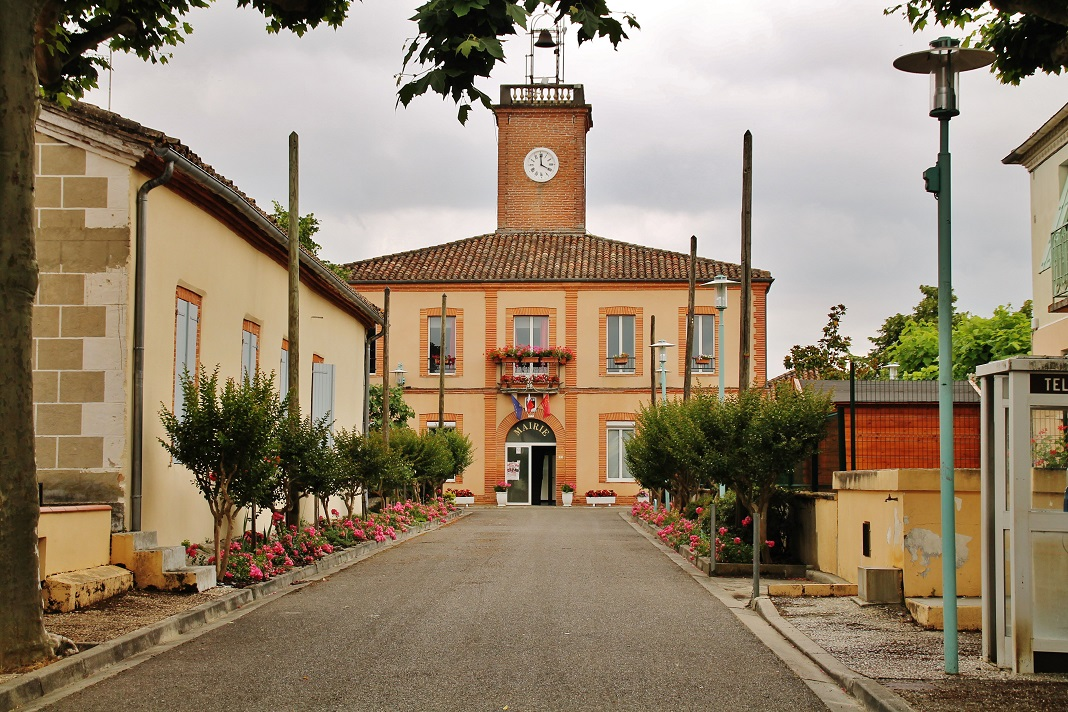

- Coat of arms
- Location of Garganvillar
- Location within France Location within Occitanie
- Coordinates: 43°58′43″N 1°04′09″E
- Country: France
- Region: Occitania
- Department: Tarn-et-Garonne
- Arrondissement: Castelsarrasin
- Canton: Beaumont-de-Lomagne

Government
  - Mayor (2020–2026): Christian Vignaux
- Area^{1}: 22.34 km^{2} (8.63 sq mi)
- Elevation: 166 m (545 ft)
- Highest elevation: 188 m (617 ft)
- Lowest elevation: 75 m (246 ft)
- Population (2023): 675
  - Density: 30.2/km^{2} (78.3/sq mi)
- Time zone: UTC+01:00 (CET)
  - Summer (DST): UTC+02:00 (CEST)
- INSEE/Postal code: 82063 /82100
- ^{1} French Land Register data, which excludes lakes, ponds, glaciers > 1 km^{2} (0.386 sq mi or 247 acres) and river estuaries.

Garganvillar is a commune in the Tarn-et-Garonne department in the Occitanie region in southern France.

== See also ==
- Communes of the Tarn-et-Garonne department
