= Auterive, Tarn-et-Garonne =

Auterive
- Commune
- Location of Auterive
- Location within France Location within Occitanie
- Coordinates: 43°51′39″N 0°58′02″E
- Country: France
- Region: Occitania
- Department: Tarn-et-Garonne
- Arrondissement: Castelsarrasin
- Canton: Beaumont-de-Lomagne
- Intercommunality: CC Lomagne Tarn-et-Garonnaise

Government
  - Mayor (2020–2026): Jacques Biasotto
- Area^{1}: 3.68 km^{2} (1.42 sq mi)
- Elevation: 120 m (390 ft)
- Highest elevation: 152 m (499 ft)
- Lowest elevation: 107 m (351 ft)
- Population (2023): 65
  - Density: 18/km^{2} (46/sq mi)
- Time zone: UTC+01:00 (CET)
  - Summer (DST): UTC+02:00 (CEST)
- INSEE/Postal code: 82006 /82500
- ^{1} French Land Register data, which excludes lakes, ponds, glaciers > 1 km^{2} (0.386 sq mi or 247 acres) and river estuaries.

Auterive (French pronunciation: [otʁiv]; Occitan: Autariba) is a commune in the Tarn-et-Garonne department in the Occitanie region in southern France.

== See also ==
- Communes of the Tarn-et-Garonne department
