= Lamothe-Cumont =

- Commune
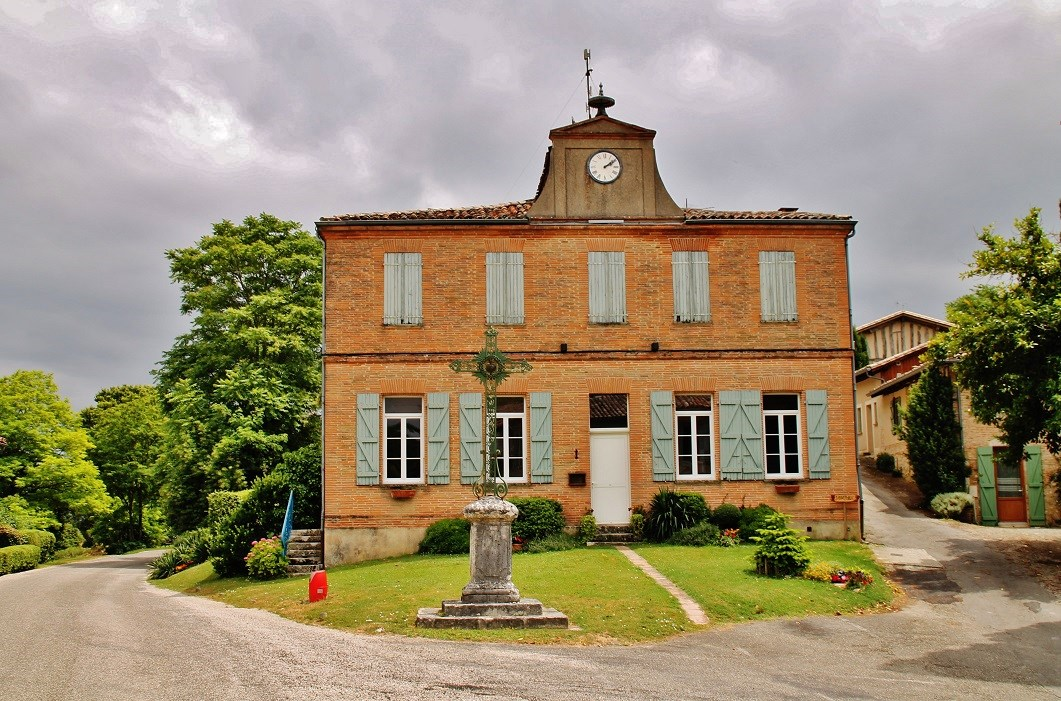
- Location of Lamothe-Cumont
- Location within France Location within Occitanie
- Coordinates: 43°52′42″N 0°54′59″E
- Country: France
- Region: Occitania
- Department: Tarn-et-Garonne
- Arrondissement: Castelsarrasin
- Canton: Beaumont-de-Lomagne
- Intercommunality: Lomagne Tarn-et-Garonnaise

Government
  - Mayor (2020–2026): René Thau
- Area^{1}: 5.35 km^{2} (2.07 sq mi)
- Elevation: 206 m (676 ft)
- Highest elevation: 261 m (856 ft)
- Lowest elevation: 128 m (420 ft)
- Population (2023): 126
  - Density: 23.6/km^{2} (61.0/sq mi)
- Time zone: UTC+01:00 (CET)
  - Summer (DST): UTC+02:00 (CEST)
- INSEE/Postal code: 82091 /82500
- ^{1} French Land Register data, which excludes lakes, ponds, glaciers > 1 km^{2} (0.386 sq mi or 247 acres) and river estuaries.

Lamothe-Cumont (French pronunciation: [lamɔt kymɔ̃]; Occitan: La Mòta de Cucmont) is a commune in the Tarn-et-Garonne department in the Occitanie region in southern France.

== See also ==
- Communes of the Tarn-et-Garonne department
