= Cumont, Tarn-et-Garonne =

Cumont
- Commune
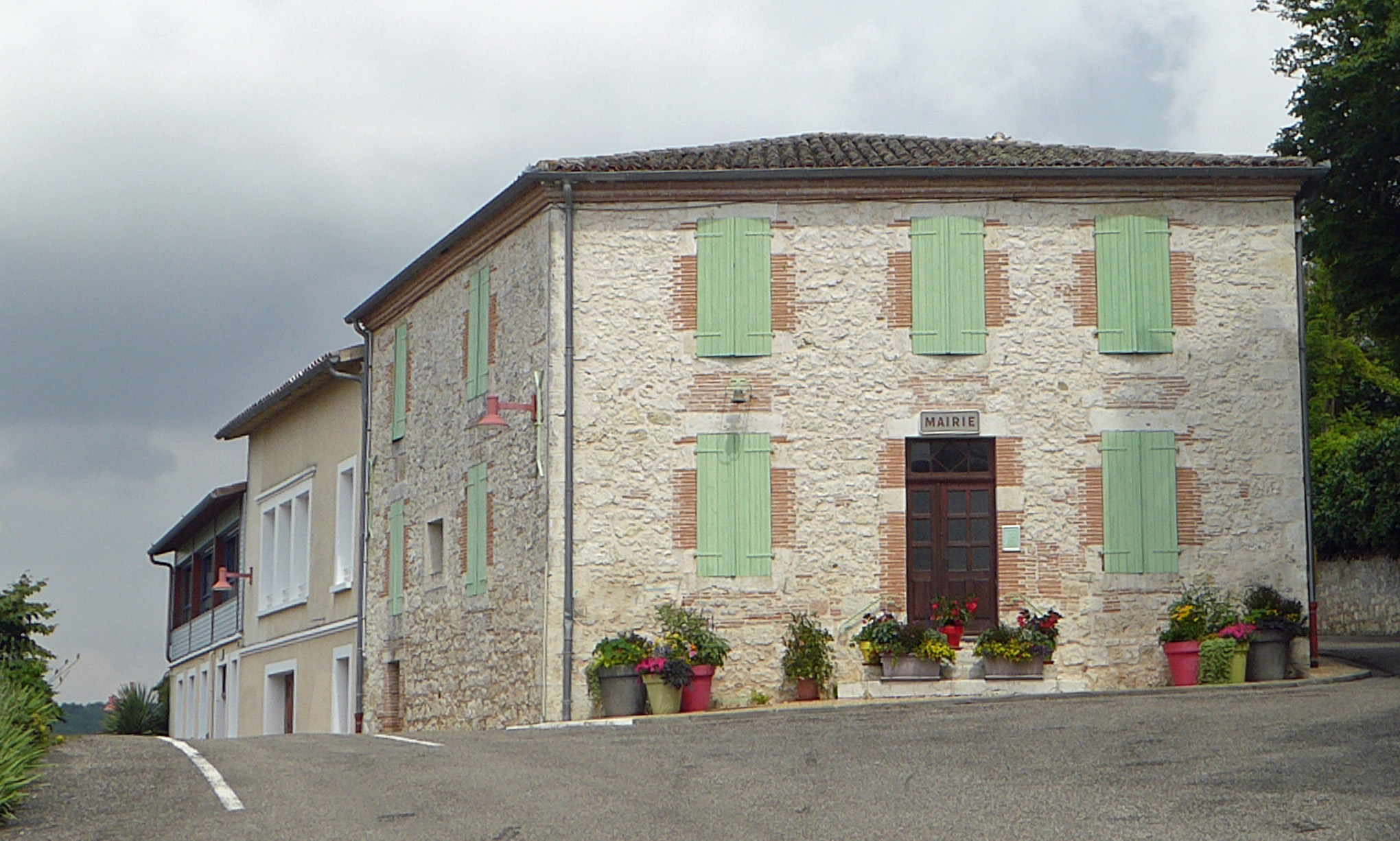
- Location of Cumont
- Location within France Location within Occitanie
- Coordinates: 43°52′36″N 0°54′02″E
- Country: France
- Region: Occitania
- Department: Tarn-et-Garonne
- Arrondissement: Castelsarrasin
- Canton: Beaumont-de-Lomagne
- Intercommunality: Lomagne Tarn-et-Garonnaise

Government
  - Mayor (2020–2026): Alain Sancey
- Area^{1}: 7.35 km^{2} (2.84 sq mi)
- Elevation: 234 m (768 ft)
- Highest elevation: 263 m (863 ft)
- Lowest elevation: 115 m (377 ft)
- Population (2023): 50
  - Density: 6.8/km^{2} (18/sq mi)
- Time zone: UTC+01:00 (CET)
  - Summer (DST): UTC+02:00 (CEST)
- INSEE/Postal code: 82047 /82500
- ^{1} French Land Register data, which excludes lakes, ponds, glaciers > 1 km^{2} (0.386 sq mi or 247 acres) and river estuaries.

Cumont (French pronunciation: [kymɔ̃]; Occitan: Cucmont) is a commune in the Tarn-et-Garonne department in the Occitanie region in southern France.

== See also ==
- Communes of the Tarn-et-Garonne department
