= Coutures, Tarn-et-Garonne =

Coutures
- Commune
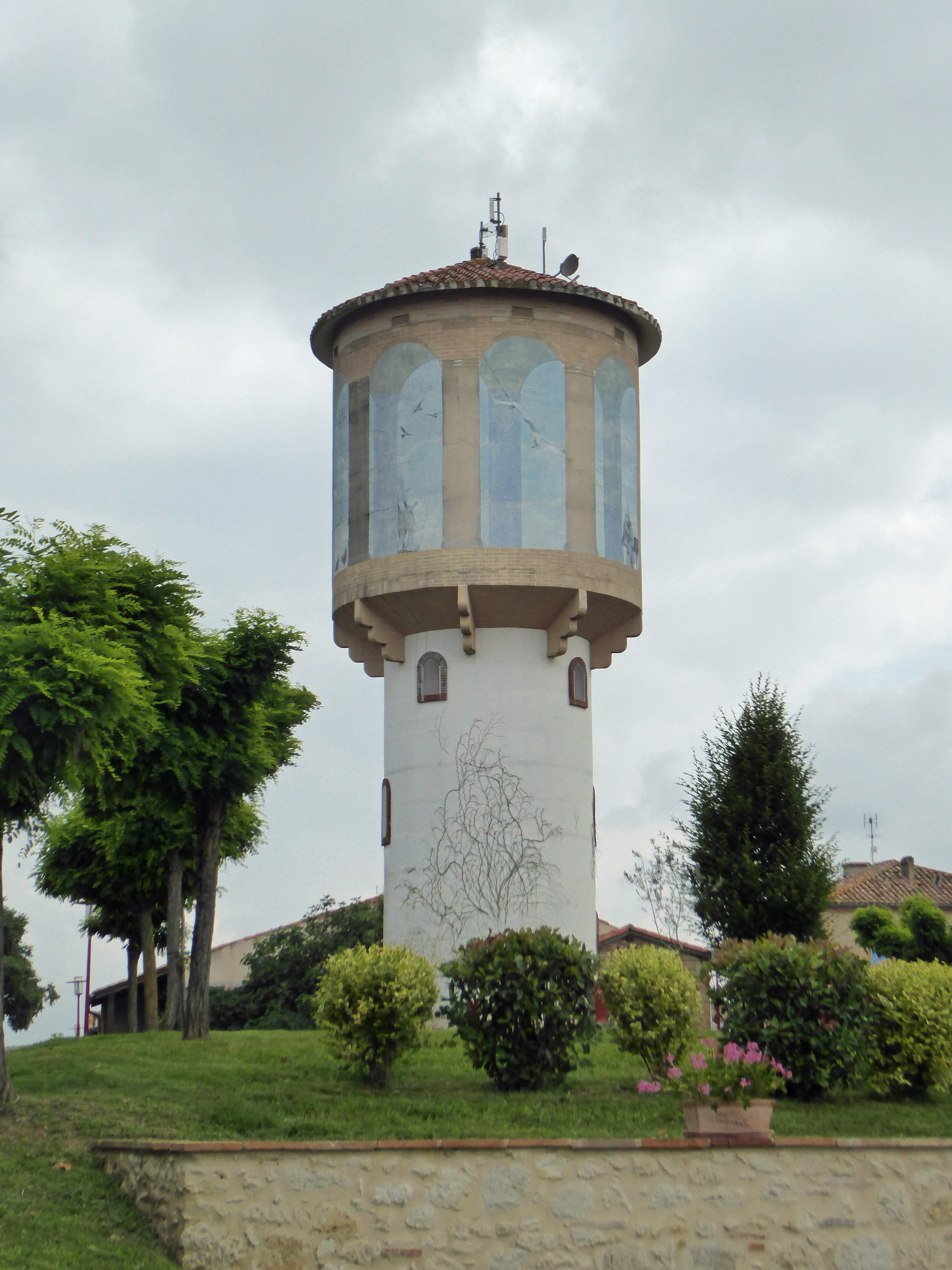
- Location of Coutures
- Location within France Location within Occitanie
- Coordinates: 43°57′11″N 0°59′13″E
- Country: France
- Region: Occitania
- Department: Tarn-et-Garonne
- Arrondissement: Castelsarrasin
- Canton: Beaumont-de-Lomagne
- Intercommunality: Terres des Confluences

Government
  - Mayor (2020–2026): Gilbert Boutines
- Area^{1}: 6.9 km^{2} (2.7 sq mi)
- Elevation: 210 m (690 ft)
- Highest elevation: 213 m (699 ft)
- Lowest elevation: 104 m (341 ft)
- Population (2023): 98
  - Density: 14/km^{2} (37/sq mi)
- Time zone: UTC+01:00 (CET)
  - Summer (DST): UTC+02:00 (CEST)
- INSEE/Postal code: 82046 /82210
- ^{1} French Land Register data, which excludes lakes, ponds, glaciers > 1 km^{2} (0.386 sq mi or 247 acres) and river estuaries.

Coutures (French pronunciation: [kutyʁ]; Occitan: Coturas) is a commune in the Tarn-et-Garonne department in the Occitanie region in southern France.

== See also ==
- Communes of the Tarn-et-Garonne department
