= Canton of Lauzerte =

Coordinates: 44°14′41″N 1°09′39″E

Lauzerte
- Former canton
- Interactive map of Lauzerte
- Country: France
- Region: Occitania
- Department: Tarn-et-Garonne
- No. of communes: {{{nbcomm}}}
- Disbanded: 2015
- Population (2012): 4,897

The canton of Lauzerte is a French former administrative division in the department of Tarn-et-Garonne and region Midi-Pyrénées. It had 4,897 inhabitants (2012). It was disbanded following the French canton reorganisation which came into effect in March 2015. It consisted of 10 communes, which joined the canton of Pays de Serres Sud-Quercy in 2015.

The canton comprised the following communes:

- Bouloc
- Lauzerte
- Cazes-Mondenard
- Durfort-Lacapelette
- Montagudet
- Montbarla
- Saint-Amans-de-Pellagal
- Sainte-Juliette
- Sauveterre
- Tréjouls
