= Canton of Bourg-de-Visa =

Coordinates: 44°14′58″N 1°00′09″E

Bourg-de-Visa
- Former canton
- Interactive map of Bourg-de-Visa
- Country: France
- Region: Occitania
- Department: Tarn-et-Garonne
- No. of communes: {{{nbcomm}}}
- Disbanded: 2015
- Population (2012): 2,126

The canton of Bourg-de-Visa is a French former administrative division in the department of Tarn-et-Garonne and region Midi-Pyrénées. It had 2,126 inhabitants (2012). It was disbanded following the French canton reorganisation which came into effect in March 2015.

The canton comprised the following communes:

- Bourg-de-Visa
- Brassac
- Fauroux
- Lacour
- Miramont-de-Quercy
- Saint-Nazaire-de-Valentane
- Touffailles
