= Canton of Moissac-1 =

Coordinates: 44°06′41″N 0°59′58″E

The Canton of Moissac-1 was one of the 12 cantons of the arrondissement of Castelsarrasin, in the Tarn-et-Garonne department, in southern France. It had 8,392 inhabitants (2012). It was disbanded following the French canton reorganisation which came into effect in March 2015. It comprised 5 communes:

- Boudou
- Malause
- Moissac (partly)
- Saint-Paul-d'Espis
- Saint-Vincent-Lespinasse
