= Barguelonne =

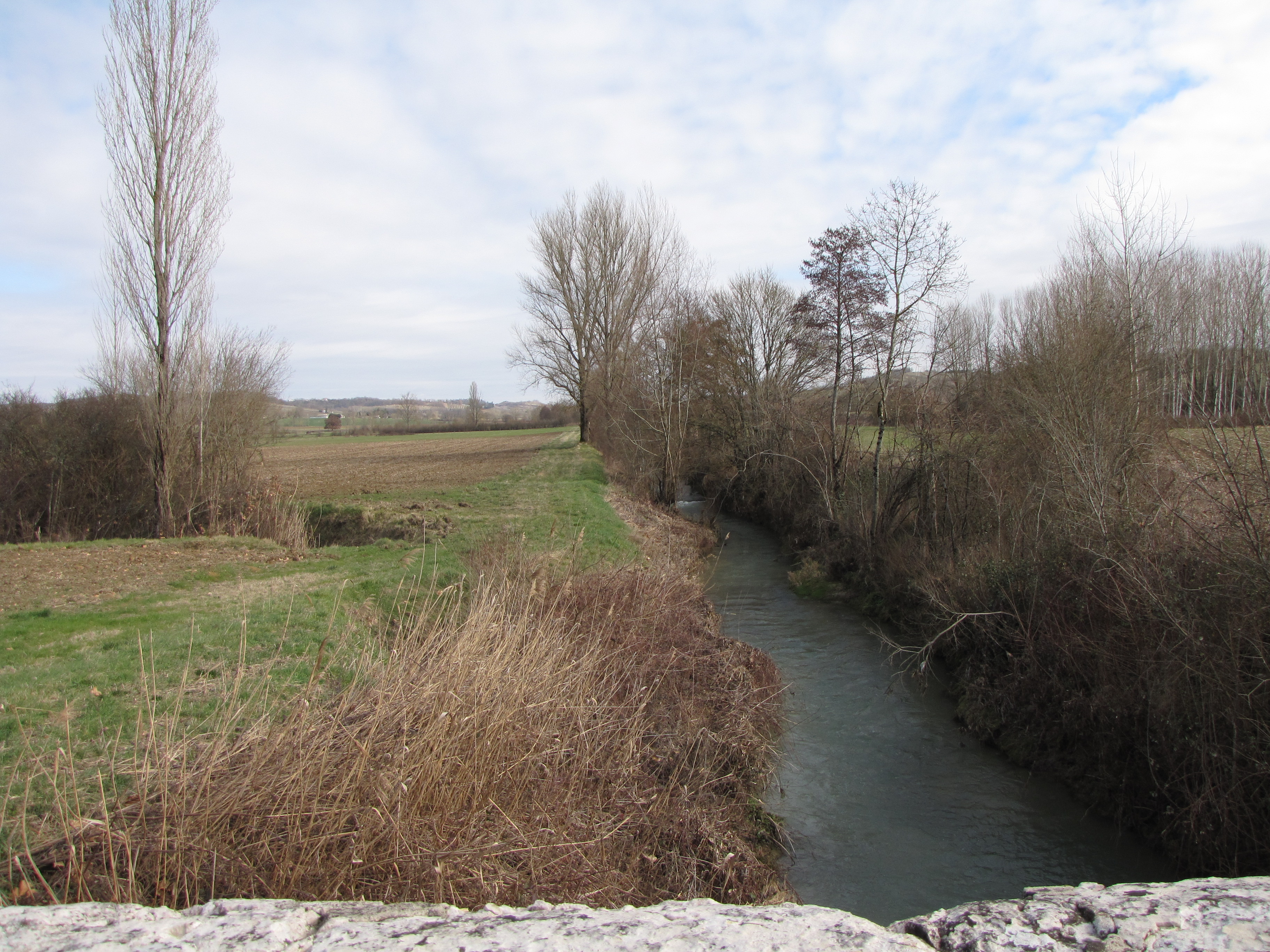
- The Barguelonne

- Location within France Location within Occitanie

Location
- Country: France

Physical characteristics
- Source
  - location: Pern
  - coordinates: 44°20′19″N 01°27′05″E
  - elevation: 245 m (804 ft)
- Mouth
  - location: Garonne
  - coordinates: 44°07′05″N 00°50′10″E
  - elevation: 50 m (160 ft)
- Length: 61.1 km (38.0 mi)
- Basin size: 555 km^{2} (214 sq mi)
- Discharge
  - average: 3.58 m^{3}/s (126 cu ft/s)

Basin features
- Progression: Garonne→ Gironde estuary→ Atlantic Ocean

The Barguelonne (French pronunciation: [baʁɡəlɔn]; Occitan: Bargalona) is a 61.1-kilometre (38.0 mi) long river in the Lot, Tarn-et-Garonne and Lot-et-Garonne départements, southwestern France. Its source is near Terry, a hamlet in Pern. It flows generally southwest. It is a right tributary of the Garonne into which it flows between Golfech and Lamagistère.

Its main tributary is the Barguelonnette.

== Départements and communes along its course ==
This list is ordered from source to mouth:

- Lot: Pern, Lhospitalet, Flaugnac, Castelnau-Montratier
- Tarn-et-Garonne: Sauveterre, Tréjouls, Cazes-Mondenard, Lauzerte, Saint-Amans-de-Pellagal, Durfort-Lacapelette, Montbarla, Miramont-de-Quercy, Montesquieu, Saint-Nazaire-de-Valentane, Castelsagrat, Saint-Paul-d'Espis, Saint-Clair, Saint-Vincent-Lespinasse, Goudourville, Gasques, Valence
- Lot-et-Garonne: Clermont-Soubiran
- Tarn-et-Garonne: Golfech, Lamagistère
