= Barguelonnette =

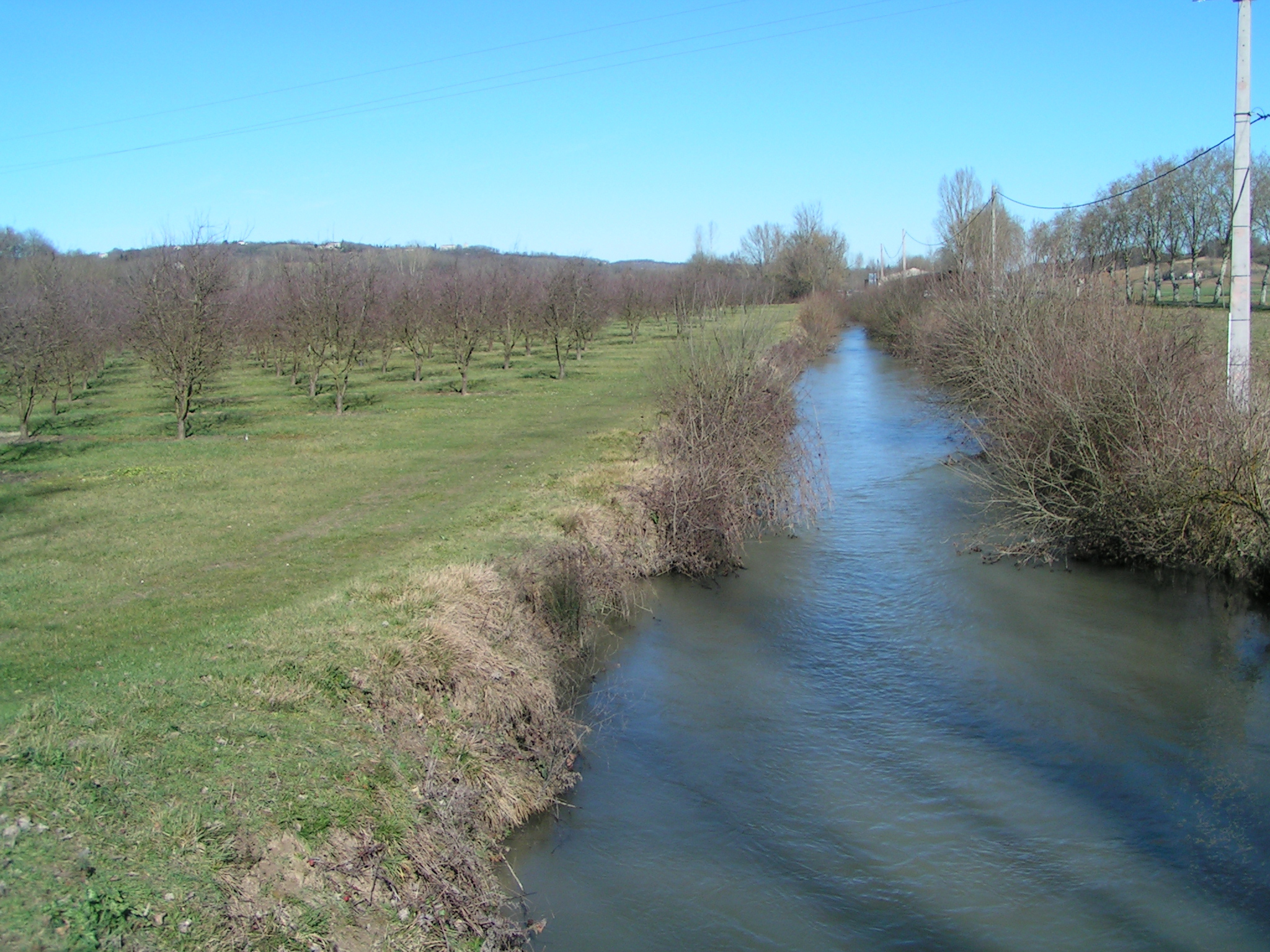
- The Barguelonnette.

- Location within France Location within Occitanie

Location
- Country: France

Physical characteristics
- Source
  - location: Villesèque
  - coordinates: 44°23′20″N 01°20′19″E
  - elevation: 265 m (869 ft)
- Mouth: Barguelonne
  - coordinates: 44°12′00″N 01°03′13″E
  - elevation: 80 m (260 ft)
- Length: 35.1 km (21.8 mi)

Basin features
- Progression: Barguelonne→ Garonne→ Gironde estuary→ Atlantic Ocean

The Barguelonnette (French pronunciation: [baʁɡəlɔnɛt], also called Petite Barguelonne, literally Little Barguelonne) is a 35.1-kilometre-long (21.8 mi) river in the Lot and Tarn-et-Garonne départements, southwestern France. Its source is at Villesèque. It flows generally southwest. It is a right tributary of the Barguelonne into which it flows between Montbarla and Montesquieu.

== Départements and communes along its course ==
This list is ordered from source to mouth:

- Lot: Villesèque, Saint-Pantaléon, Saint-Daunès, Montcuq, Lebreil
- Tarn-et-Garonne: Sainte-Juliette, Bouloc, Lauzerte, Montagudet, Saint-Amans-de-Pellagal, Montbarla, Miramont-de-Quercy, Montesquieu,
