= Golfech station =

Railway station in Golfech, Occitanie, France

Coordinates: 44°07′00″N 0°51′05″E

Golfech

General information
- Location: Golfech, Tarn-et-Garonne, Occitanie; France
- Line: Bordeaux–Sète railway
- Platforms: 2
- Tracks: 2

Other information
- Station code: 87618082

History
- Closed: 2017
Location

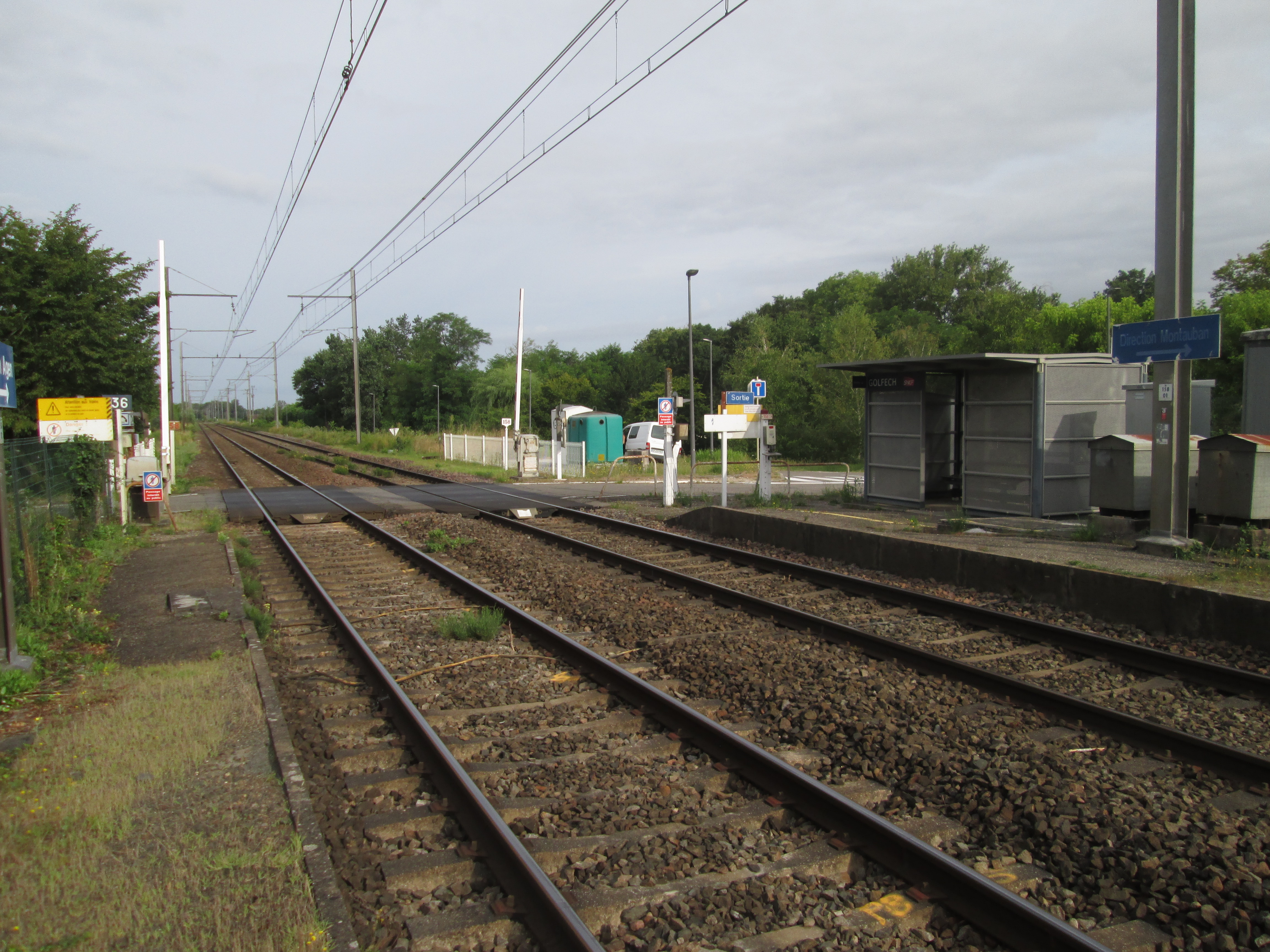

Golfech is a former railway station in Golfech, Occitanie, France. The station is on the Bordeaux–Sète railway. The station was served by TER (local) services operated by SNCF, between Agen and Toulouse. Train service was suspended in 2017.
