= Saint-Clair, Tarn-et-Garonne =

Saint-Clair
- Commune
- Coat of arms
- Location of Saint-Clair
- Location within France Location within Occitanie
- Coordinates: 44°09′50″N 0°56′49″E
- Country: France
- Region: Occitania
- Department: Tarn-et-Garonne
- Arrondissement: Castelsarrasin
- Canton: Valence
- Intercommunality: Deux Rives

Government
  - Mayor (2020–2026): Gérard Bongiovanni
- Area^{1}: 8.35 km^{2} (3.22 sq mi)
- Elevation: 203 m (666 ft)
- Highest elevation: 181 m (594 ft)
- Lowest elevation: 67 m (220 ft)
- Population (2023): 260
  - Density: 31/km^{2} (81/sq mi)
- Time zone: UTC+01:00 (CET)
  - Summer (DST): UTC+02:00 (CEST)
- INSEE/Postal code: 82160 /82400
- ^{1} French Land Register data, which excludes lakes, ponds, glaciers > 1 km^{2} (0.386 sq mi or 247 acres) and river estuaries.

Saint-Clair (French pronunciation: [sɛ̃ klɛːʁ]; Occitan: Sent Clar) is a commune in the Tarn-et-Garonne department in the Occitanie region in southern France.

== Geography ==
The Barguelonne forms all of the commune's south-eastern border.

== See also ==
- Communes of the Tarn-et-Garonne department
