= Valence-d'Agen station =

Railway station in Valence, France

Coordinates: 44°06′42″N 0°53′24″E

Valence-d'Agen
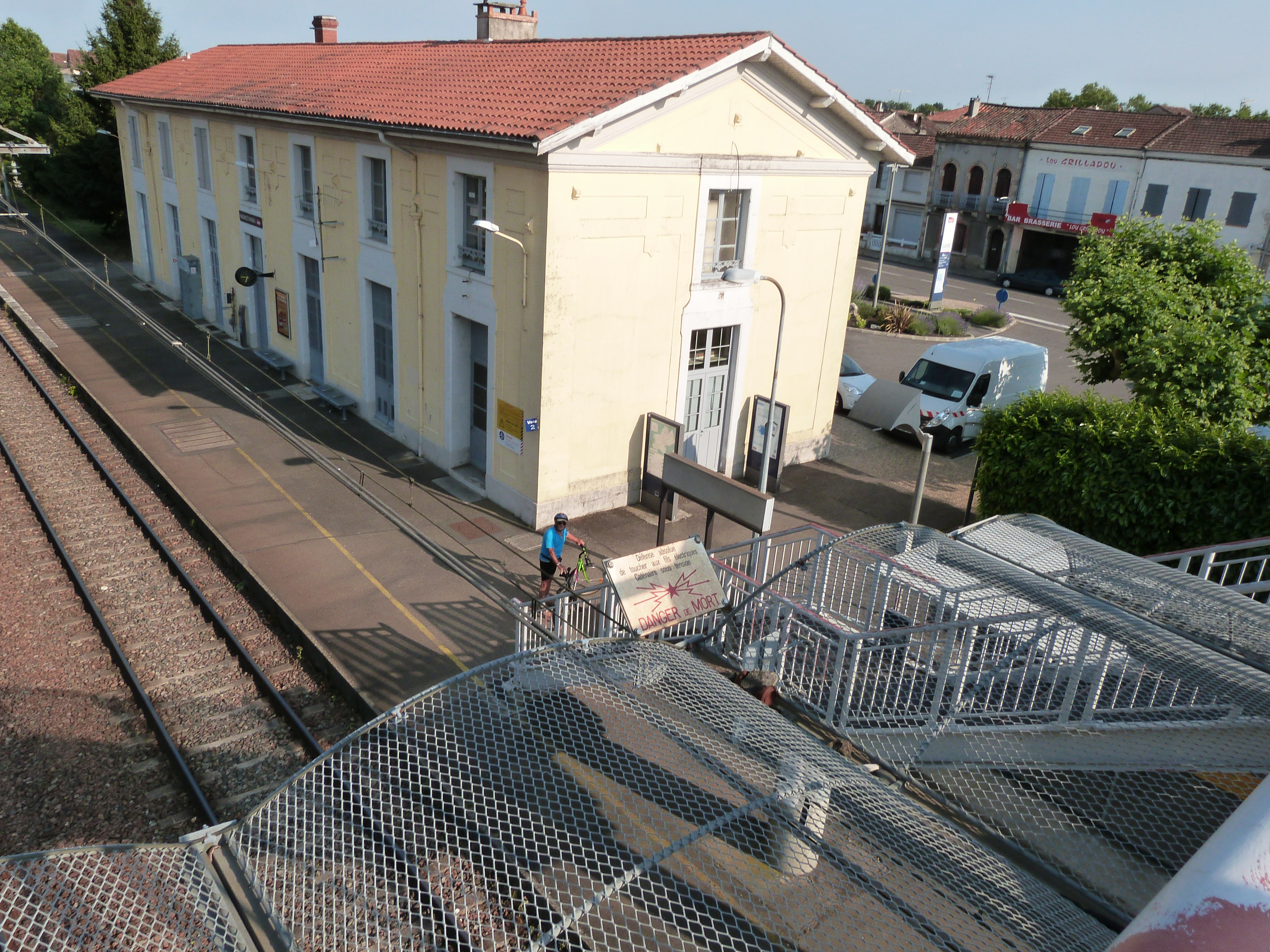
- Valence-d'Agen train station building

General information
- Location: Valence, Tarn-et-Garonne, Occitanie; France
- Line: Bordeaux–Sète railway
- Platforms: 2
- Tracks: 2

Other information
- Station code: 87611863

Services
Preceding station	TER Occitanie	Following station
Lamagistère towards Agen	18	Moissac towards Toulouse
Location

Valence-d'Agen is a railway station in Valence, Tarn-et-Garonne, Occitanie, France. The station is on the Bordeaux–Sète railway. The station is served by TER (local) services operated by SNCF.

== Train services ==
The following services currently call at Valence-d'Agen:

- local service (TER Occitanie) Agen – Montauban – Toulouse
