= Lamagistère =

- Commune
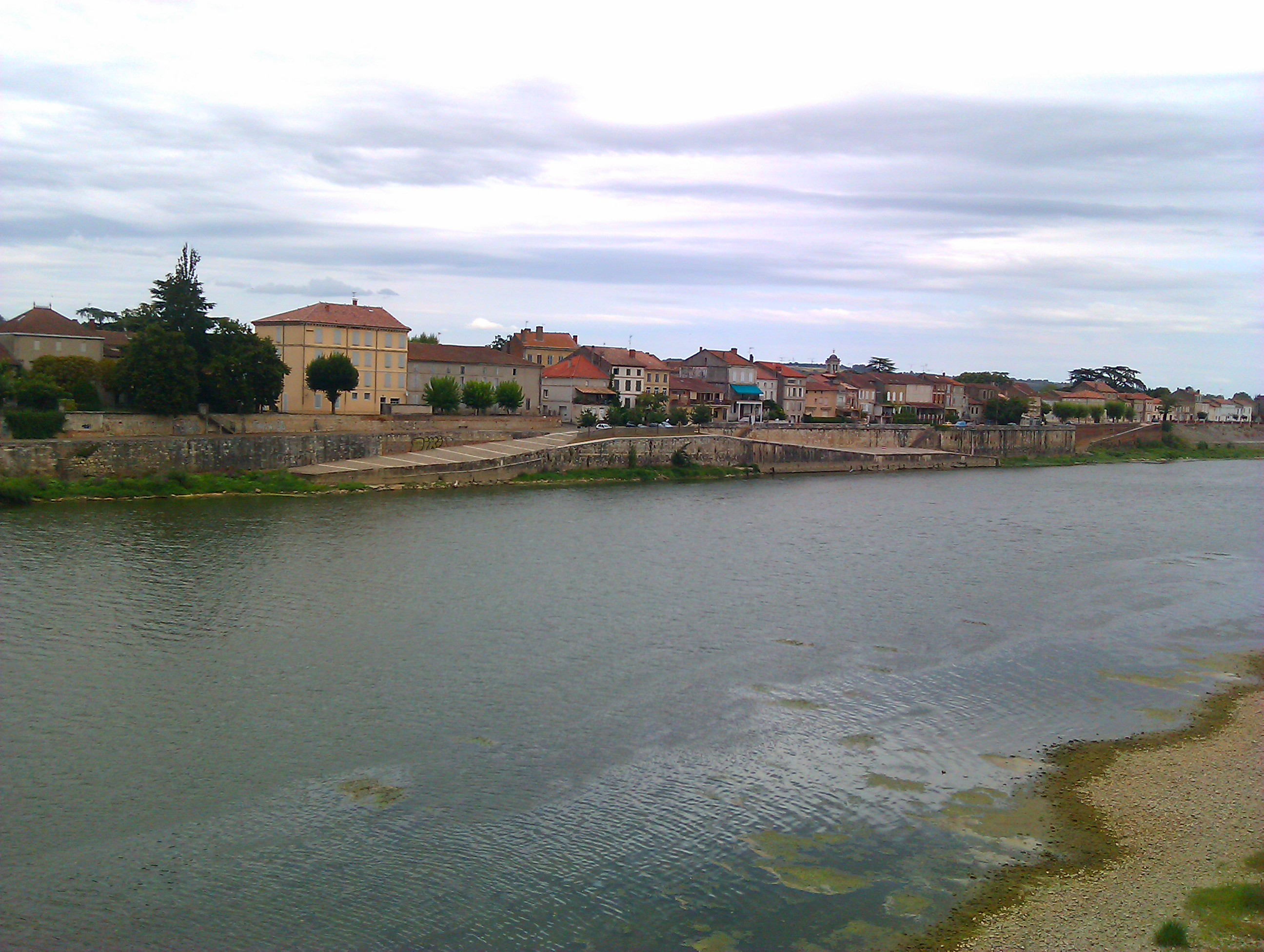
- A view of the village from across the Garonne river

- Coat of arms
- Location of Lamagistère
- Location within France Location within Occitanie
- Coordinates: 44°07′33″N 0°49′28″E
- Country: France
- Region: Occitania
- Department: Tarn-et-Garonne
- Arrondissement: Castelsarrasin
- Canton: Valence
- Intercommunality: Deux Rives

Government
  - Mayor (2020–2026): Bruno Dousson
- Area^{1}: 9.1 km^{2} (3.5 sq mi)
- Elevation: 55 m (180 ft)
- Highest elevation: 65 m (213 ft)
- Lowest elevation: 45 m (148 ft)
- Population (2023): 1,218
  - Density: 130/km^{2} (350/sq mi)
- Time zone: UTC+01:00 (CET)
  - Summer (DST): UTC+02:00 (CEST)
- INSEE/Postal code: 82089 /82360
- ^{1} French Land Register data, which excludes lakes, ponds, glaciers > 1 km^{2} (0.386 sq mi or 247 acres) and river estuaries.

Lamagistère (French pronunciation: [lamaʒistɛʁ]; Occitan: La Magistèra, or La Magistère) is a commune in the Tarn-et-Garonne department in the Occitanie region in southern France. Inhabitants of the district are known as les Magistériens.

== Geography ==
The district is located between the larger towns of Agen and Castelsarrasin. The nearest villages are Golfech, Donzac, Clermont-Soubiran, Saint-Urcisse and Saint-Sixte. The Barguelonne forms all of the commune's south-eastern border, then flows into the Garonne, which forms its southern and south-western borders. The commune, which is approximately 9 km^{2}, is composed of a small village and surrounding territory.

The Route nationale N113 (national trunk road), used to run through the middle of the village but was later diverted around the town. In 2006, the French government downgraded some national trunk roads to departmental status roads. The N113 was one such road which was downgraded and now the diverted road is signed as the D813. However the historical designation can still be seen in a street sign in the middle of the village.

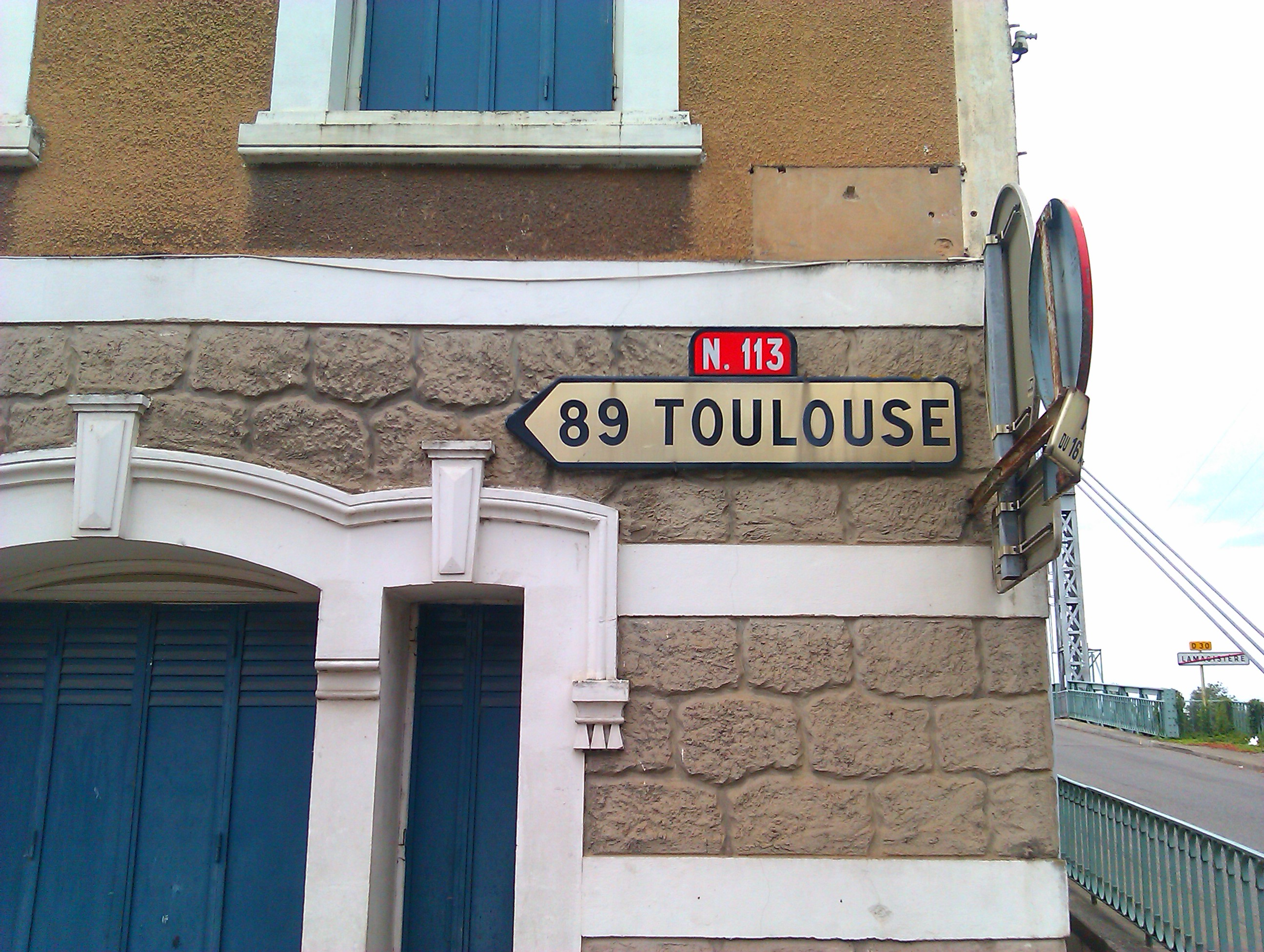
An old N113 sign in the middle of the village

In fact the middle of the village is also a cross roads with the D30, which commences as a bridge over the Garonne River.

Lamagistère station, on the Bordeaux-Toulouse line, is located in the middle of the town. The village has a public library and a school but lacks, in 2012, a cinema or museum.

== History ==
During the second world war the district was at the heart of a Franco-American sabotage operation. On the night of 15 to 16 August 1944, a section of the train line running between Bordeaux and Toulouse, which was defended by a garrison of German soldiers, was attacked by a combined force of American commandos, French partisans from Lot and a company of the Armée Secrète of Tarn-et-Garonne.

== Demographics ==
The following table shows the recorded population of the commune according to INSEE.

Historical population
Year	Pop.	±% p.a.
1968	1,192	—
1975	1,153	−0.47%
1982	1,084	−0.88%
1990	1,248	+1.78%
1999	1,187	−0.56%
2007	1,227	+0.42%
2012	1,120	−1.81%
2017	1,154	+0.60%
2023	1,218	+0.90%
Source: INSEE

== Political Administration ==
The following table shows the names of the elected mayors of the commune in recent times and their period of tenure in the post.

Period	Mayor
2020-2026	Bruno Dousson
2014-2020	Philippe Longo
2008-2014	Bernard Dousson
2001-2008	Bernard Cassagne
1989-2001	André Simon
1960-1989	Jean Geoffroy

== Culture and sights ==
- Church of the Immaculate Conception in Lamagistère. The building is listed in the Mérimée database and the General Inventory of the Occitanie Region. Several items are listed in the Palissy database.
- War memorial.
- Quai de Garonne.

=== Heraldry and motto ===
Arms of Lamagistère	Argent, a boat equipped with two masts in their natural form in half-profile, dressed in gold, sailing on a sea of azure agitated by sand, on a chief vert charged with a star also of gold.

The coat of arms is accompanied by the motto fac et spera (act and hope).

== See also ==
- Communes of the Tarn-et-Garonne department
