= Castelsagrat =

- Commune
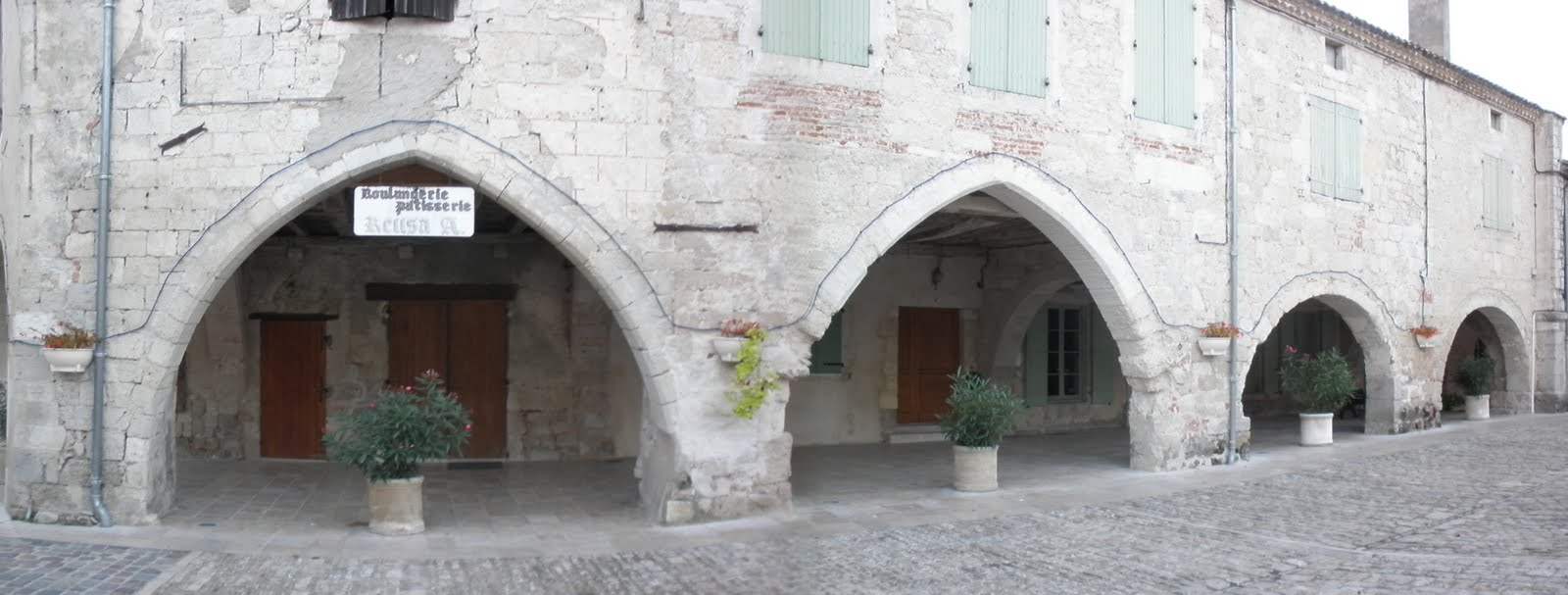
- The square in Castelsagrat

- Coat of arms
- Location of Castelsagrat
- Location within France Location within Occitanie
- Coordinates: 44°11′06″N 0°56′52″E
- Country: France
- Region: Occitania
- Department: Tarn-et-Garonne
- Arrondissement: Castelsarrasin
- Canton: Valence
- Intercommunality: Deux Rives

Government
  - Mayor (2020–2026): Francine Fillatre
- Area^{1}: 22.5 km^{2} (8.7 sq mi)
- Elevation: 86 m (282 ft)
- Highest elevation: 203 m (666 ft)
- Lowest elevation: 69 m (226 ft)
- Population (2023): 547
  - Density: 24.3/km^{2} (63.0/sq mi)
- Time zone: UTC+01:00 (CET)
  - Summer (DST): UTC+02:00 (CEST)
- INSEE/Postal code: 82032 /82400
- ^{1} French Land Register data, which excludes lakes, ponds, glaciers > 1 km^{2} (0.386 sq mi or 247 acres) and river estuaries.

Castelsagrat is a commune in the Tarn-et-Garonne department in the Occitanie region in southern France.

== Geography ==
The Séoune forms most of the commune's northern border. The Barguelonne forms all of the commune's south-eastern border.

== See also ==
- Communes of the Tarn-et-Garonne department
