= Villesèque =

- Commune
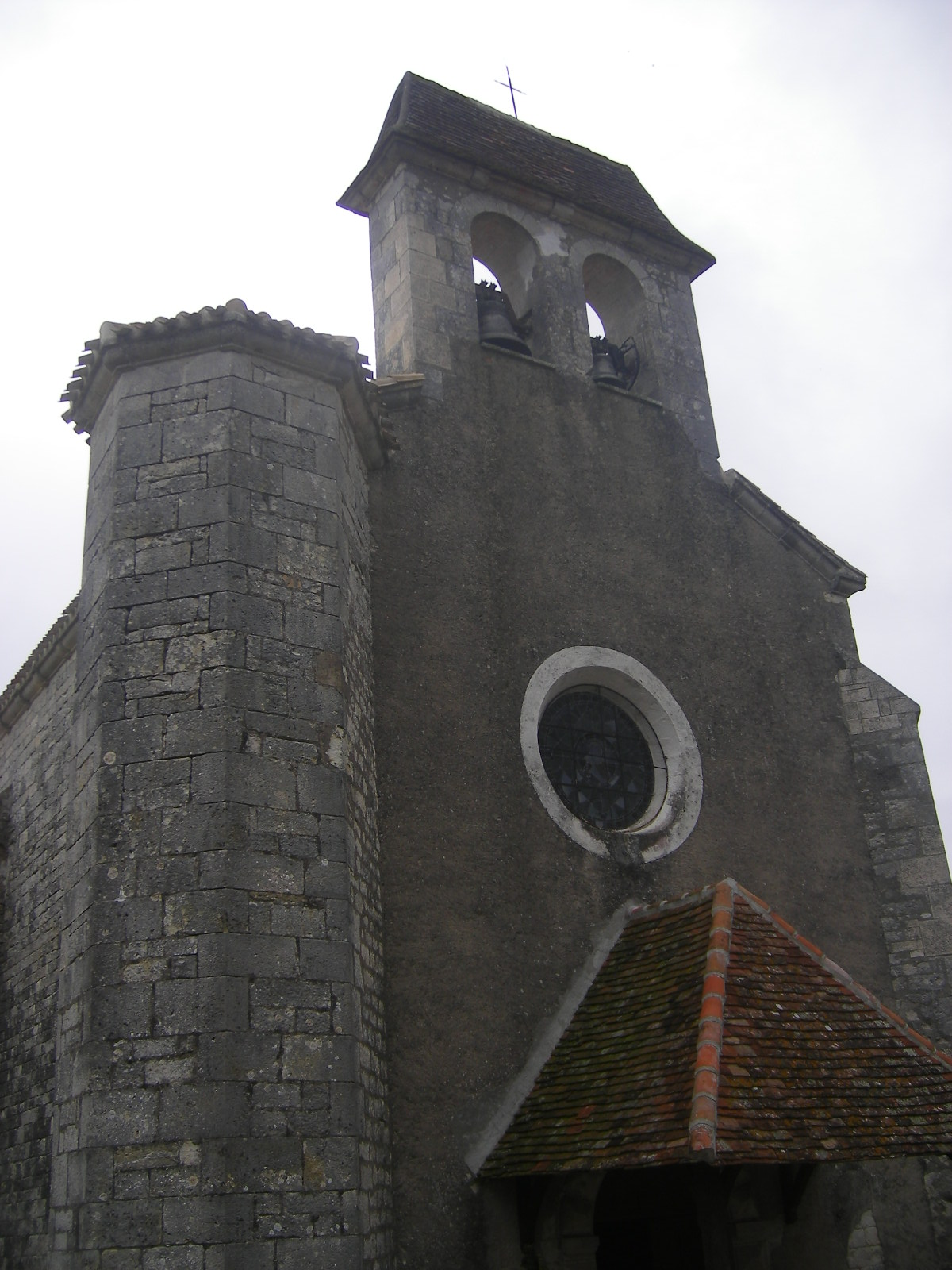
- The church of Saint-Michel

- Coat of arms
- Location of Villesèque
- Location within France Location within Occitanie
- Coordinates: 44°23′31″N 1°19′08″E
- Country: France
- Region: Occitania
- Department: Lot
- Arrondissement: Cahors
- Canton: Luzech
- Intercommunality: CC Vallée du Lot et du Vignoble

Government
  - Mayor (2020–2026): Jean-Marie Oustry
- Area^{1}: 23.56 km^{2} (9.10 sq mi)
- Elevation: 200 m (660 ft)
- Highest elevation: 339 m (1,112 ft)
- Lowest elevation: 199 m (653 ft)
- Population (2023): 409
  - Density: 17.4/km^{2} (45.0/sq mi)
- Time zone: UTC+01:00 (CET)
  - Summer (DST): UTC+02:00 (CEST)
- INSEE/Postal code: 46335 /46090
- ^{1} French Land Register data, which excludes lakes, ponds, glaciers > 1 km^{2} (0.386 sq mi or 247 acres) and river estuaries.

Villesèque (French pronunciation: [vilsɛk]; Languedocien: Vilaseca) is a commune in the Lot department in south-western France.

== Geography ==
The Barguelonnette rises in the commune, then flows southwestward through its southern part.

== See also ==
- Communes of the Lot department
