= Goudourville =

- Commune
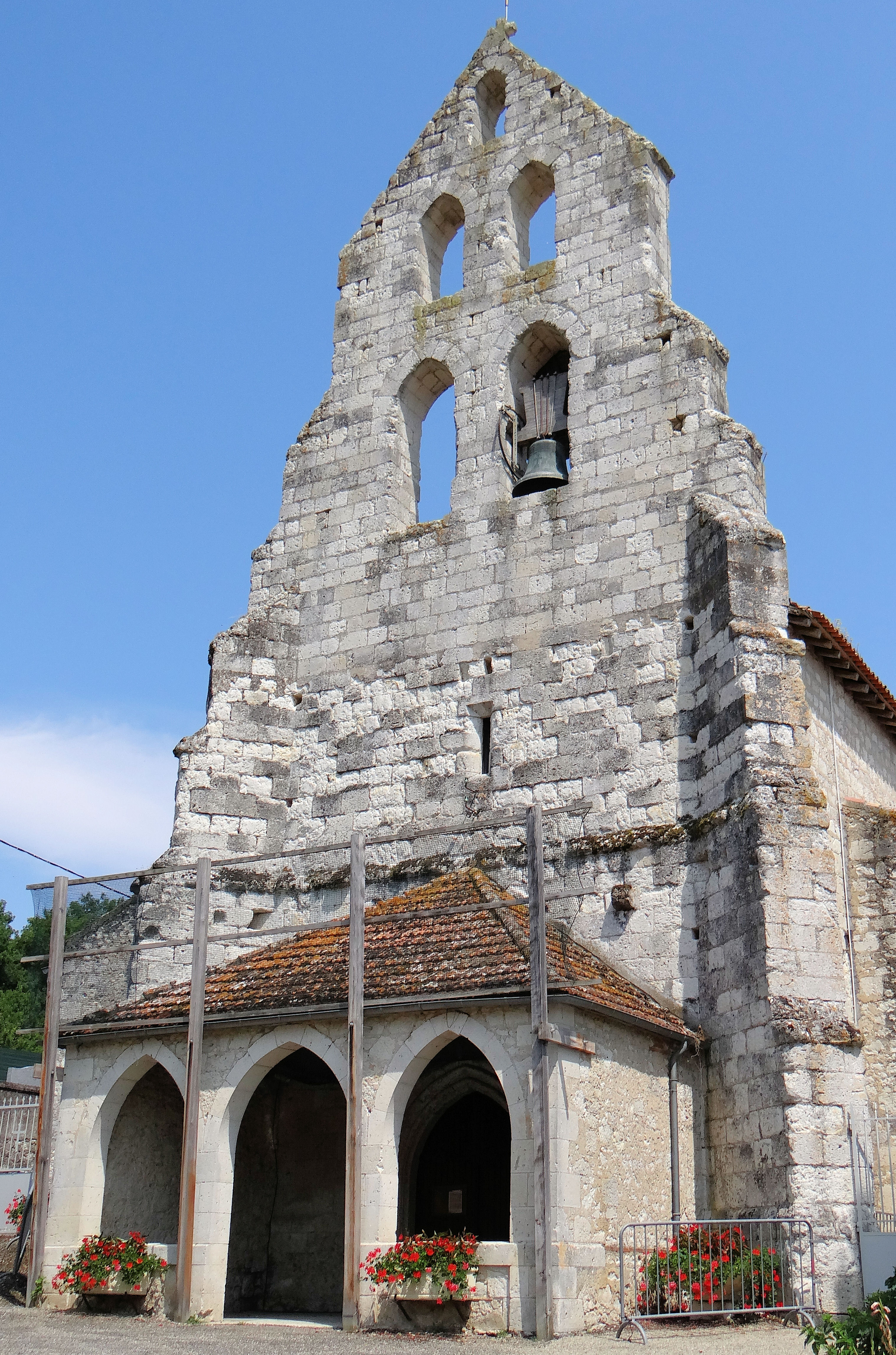
- The church of Saint-Julien-de-Brioude, in Goudourville

- Coat of arms
- Location of Goudourville
- Location within France Location within Occitanie
- Coordinates: 44°06′55″N 0°55′46″E
- Country: France
- Region: Occitania
- Department: Tarn-et-Garonne
- Arrondissement: Castelsarrasin
- Canton: Valence
- Intercommunality: Deux Rives

Government
  - Mayor (2020–2026): Gérard Barros
- Area^{1}: 11.27 km^{2} (4.35 sq mi)
- Elevation: 130 m (430 ft)
- Highest elevation: 182 m (597 ft)
- Lowest elevation: 57 m (187 ft)
- Population (2023): 976
  - Density: 86.6/km^{2} (224/sq mi)
- Time zone: UTC+01:00 (CET)
  - Summer (DST): UTC+02:00 (CEST)
- INSEE/Postal code: 82073 /82400
- ^{1} French Land Register data, which excludes lakes, ponds, glaciers > 1 km^{2} (0.386 sq mi or 247 acres) and river estuaries.

Goudourville (French pronunciation: [guduʁvil]; Occitan: Godorvila) is a commune in the Tarn-et-Garonne department in the Occitanie region in southern France. The Barguelonne forms all of the commune's northern border.

== See also ==
- Communes of the Tarn-et-Garonne department
