= Gasques =

- Commune
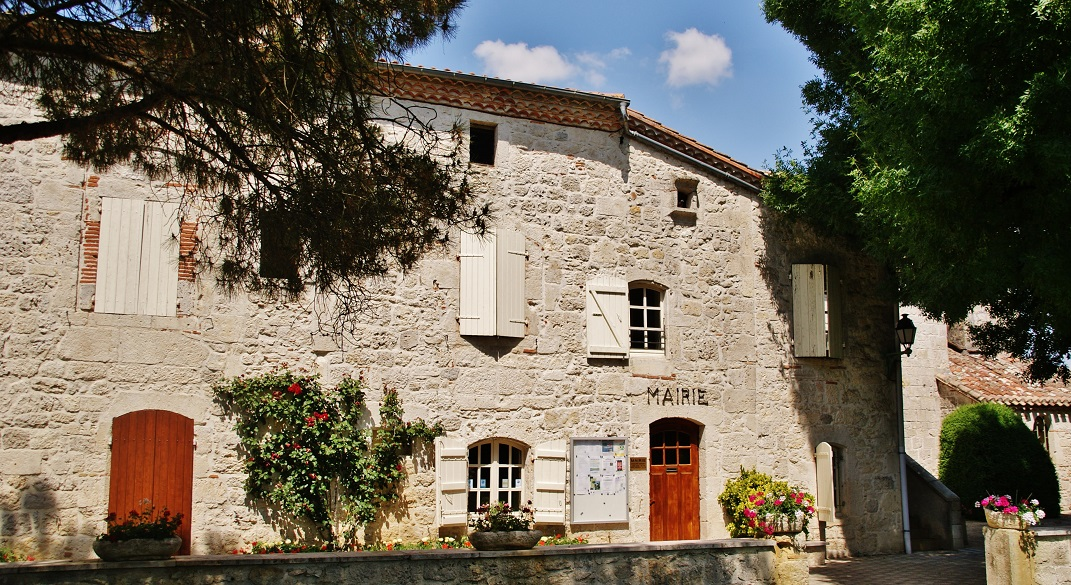
- Town hall

- Coat of arms
- Location of Gasques
- Location within France Location within Occitanie
- Coordinates: 44°09′19″N 0°55′08″E
- Country: France
- Region: Occitania
- Department: Tarn-et-Garonne
- Arrondissement: Castelsarrasin
- Canton: Valence
- Intercommunality: Deux Rives

Government
  - Mayor (2020–2026): Guy Meriel
- Area^{1}: 13.43 km^{2} (5.19 sq mi)
- Elevation: 85 m (279 ft)
- Highest elevation: 196 m (643 ft)
- Lowest elevation: 64 m (210 ft)
- Population (2023): 404
  - Density: 30.1/km^{2} (77.9/sq mi)
- Time zone: UTC+01:00 (CET)
  - Summer (DST): UTC+02:00 (CEST)
- INSEE/Postal code: 82065 /82400
- ^{1} French Land Register data, which excludes lakes, ponds, glaciers > 1 km^{2} (0.386 sq mi or 247 acres) and river estuaries.

Gasques (French pronunciation: [ɡask]; Occitan: Gascas) is a commune in the Tarn-et-Garonne department in the Occitanie region in southern France.

== Geography ==
The Barguelonne forms most of the commune's southern border.

== See also ==
- Communes of the Tarn-et-Garonne department
