= Golfech =

- Commune
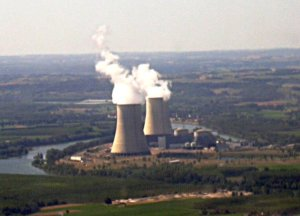
- Golfech Nuclear Power Plant
- Location of Golfech
- Location within France Location within Occitanie
- Coordinates: 44°06′53″N 0°51′07″E
- Country: France
- Region: Occitania
- Department: Tarn-et-Garonne
- Arrondissement: Castelsarrasin
- Canton: Valence
- Intercommunality: Deux Rives

Government
  - Mayor (2020–2026): Pascal Benoit
- Area^{1}: 9.72 km^{2} (3.75 sq mi)
- Highest elevation: 71 m (233 ft)
- Lowest elevation: 47 m (154 ft)
- Population (2023): 1,007
  - Density: 104/km^{2} (268/sq mi)
- Time zone: UTC+01:00 (CET)
  - Summer (DST): UTC+02:00 (CEST)
- INSEE/Postal code: 82072 /82400
- ^{1} French Land Register data, which excludes lakes, ponds, glaciers > 1 km^{2} (0.386 sq mi or 247 acres) and river estuaries.

Golfech (French pronunciation: [ɡɔlfɛʃ]; Occitan: Golfuèg) is a commune in the Tarn-et-Garonne department in the Occitanie region in southern France.

It neighbours the larger town of Valence d'Agen and stands on the D813 road between Bordeaux and Toulouse and beside the canal de Garonne and railway that also link the cities. The D813 is classified as a departmental road in the French system. Formerly, this road was designated as the N113, where the N indicated that it was a national road. The Voie Verte cycle path serves the commune from Moissac to the east and the western border of Lot-et-Garonne towards Bordeaux. It will eventually run all the way from Bordeaux to Sète. The residents of Golfech are known as Golféchois.

The Golfech Nuclear Power Plant is located in the western part of the commune.

The river Barguelonne forms most of the commune's northern and north-western borders, then flows into the Garonne, which forms all of its south-western border.

== Demography ==
Historical population
Year	Pop.	±% p.a.
1968	555	—
1975	470	−2.35%
1982	440	−0.94%
1990	555	+2.94%
1999	710	+2.77%
2007	824	+1.88%
2012	959	+3.08%
2017	985	+0.54%
2023	1,007	+0.37%
Source: INSEE

== See also ==
- Communes of the Tarn-et-Garonne department
