= Canton of Valence =

Coordinates: 44°08′20″N 0°54′16″E

The Canton of Valence is one of the 15 cantons of the Tarn-et-Garonne department, in southern France. At the French canton reorganisation which came into effect in March 2015, the canton was expanded from 11 to 17 communes:

- Boudou
- Bourg-de-Visa
- Brassac
- Castelsagrat
- Espalais
- Gasques
- Golfech
- Goudourville
- Lamagistère
- Montjoi
- Perville
- Pommevic
- Saint-Clair
- Saint-Nazaire-de-Valentane
- Saint-Paul-d'Espis
- Saint-Vincent-Lespinasse
- Valence
