= Louis-Charles-Joseph Rey =

French classical cellist (1738-1811)

Louis-Charles-Joseph Rey (26 October 1738 – 12 May 1811) was a French classical cellist, the brother of Jean-Baptiste Rey.

Louis-Charles-Joseph Rey was born in Lauzerte. Like his brother, he began as a choirboy at the Abbey of Saint-Sernin, where he studied music. At the age of sixteen, he joined the theater in Montpellier as a cellist. He went to Paris in 1755, where he took lessons from Martin Berteau. Two years later, he became a cellist at the Grand Théâtre de Bordeaux. He returned to Paris in 1766 and entered the orchestra of the Paris Opera the following year. In 1772, he was admitted to King Louis XVI's chapel. He retired from the Opera House in 1806 and committed suicide less than five years later in Paris, cutting his throat with a razor.

He was the author of vocal and instrumental music (three ballets, one opera, four ariettas, six cello sonatas, six duos for cello and a trio).
