= Montesquieu, Tarn-et-Garonne =

Montesquieu
- Commune
- Location of Montesquieu
- Location within France Location within Occitanie
- Coordinates: 44°11′13″N 1°04′48″E
- Country: France
- Region: Occitania
- Department: Tarn-et-Garonne
- Arrondissement: Castelsarrasin
- Canton: Moissac

Government
  - Mayor (2020–2026): Annie Feau
- Area^{1}: 28.65 km^{2} (11.06 sq mi)
- Elevation: 194 m (636 ft)
- Highest elevation: 197 m (646 ft)
- Lowest elevation: 72 m (236 ft)
- Population (2023): 748
  - Density: 26.1/km^{2} (67.6/sq mi)
- Time zone: UTC+01:00 (CET)
  - Summer (DST): UTC+02:00 (CEST)
- INSEE/Postal code: 82127 /82200
- ^{1} French Land Register data, which excludes lakes, ponds, glaciers > 1 km^{2} (0.386 sq mi or 247 acres) and river estuaries.

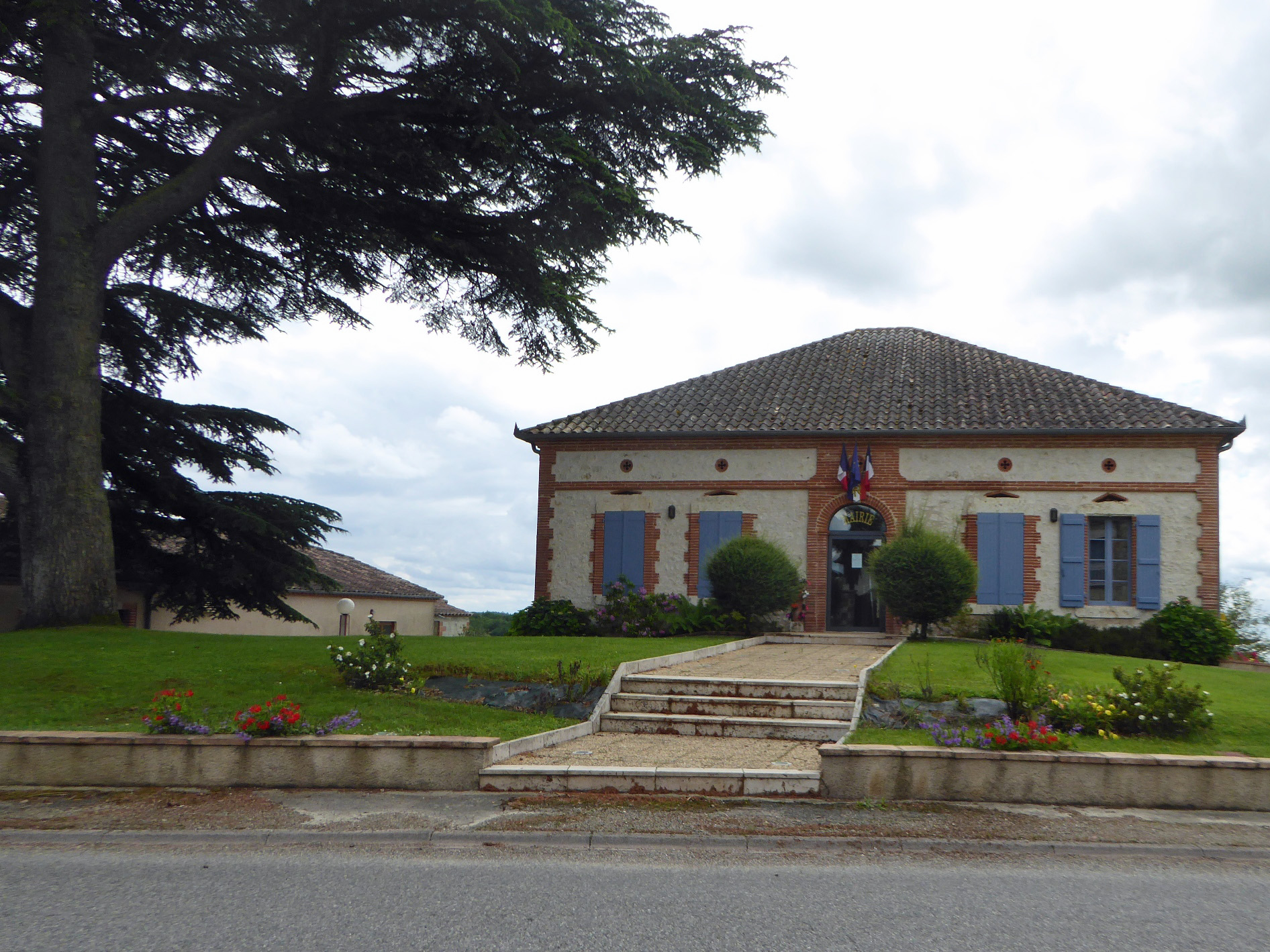
MONTESQUIEU SAINTE THECLE

Montesquieu (French pronunciation: [mɔ̃tɛskjø]; Languedocien: Senta Tecla de Montesquiu) is a commune in the Tarn-et-Garonne department in the Occitanie region in southern France.

== Geography ==
On the commune's northern border, the Barguelonnette flows into the Barguelonne, which forms all of the commune's northern and northwestern borders.

== See also ==
- Communes of the Tarn-et-Garonne department
