= Golfech Nuclear Power Plant =

Nuclear power plant in France

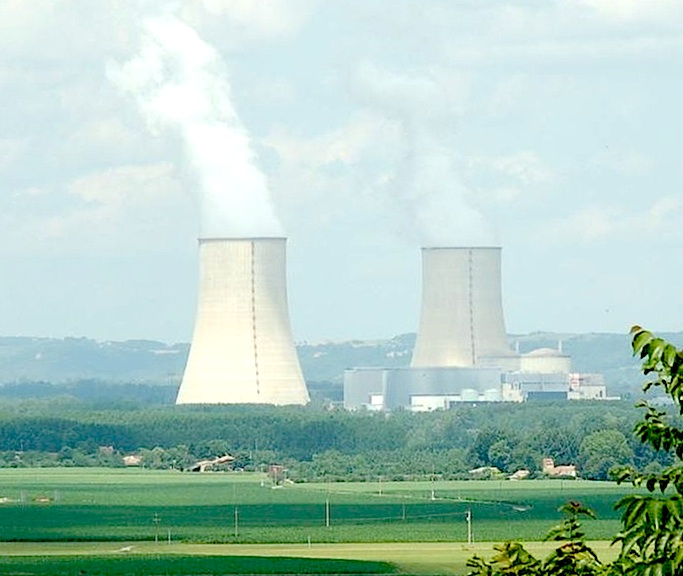
- Golfech Nuclear Power Plant
- Official name: Centrale Nucléaire de Golfech
- Country: France
- Location: Golfech (Tarn-et-Garonne)
- Coordinates: 44°6′24″N 0°50′43″E
- Status: Operational
- Construction began: 1982
- Commission date: 1 February 1991; 35 years ago
- Operator: EDF

Nuclear power station
- Reactor type: PWR
- Reactor supplier: Framatome
- Cooling towers: 2 × Natural Draft
- Cooling source: Garonne

Power generation
- Units operational: 2 × 1363 MW
- Make and model: Alstom
- Nameplate capacity: 2726 MW
- Capacity factor: 75.3%
- Annual net output: 17,992 GW·h

External links
- Commons: Related media on Commons

The Golfech Nuclear Power Plant is located in the commune of Golfech (Tarn-et-Garonne), on the border of Garonne between Agen (30 km downstream) and Toulouse (90 km upstream) on the river Garonne, from where it gets cooling water, it is approximately 40 km west of Montauban.

The station has two operating nuclear reactors that are both pressurized water reactors of the French P'4 design. The plant also has two 178.5-metre-tall cooling towers that get water from the Garonne River, only using water to compensate for evaporation; the cooling loop is closed and water is never released back into the river.

In 2002 the plant produced nearly half of the electricity used in the area. It employs nearly 700 full-time workers.

== History ==
In 1965, the Midi-Pyrénées announced its intention to construct a nuclear plant near Malause. EDF then went about securing a site for the station. In 1967 a board of inquiry initially laid out plans for two UNGG reactors with an output of 800 MWe each.

Due to falling petroleum prices and conflicts between EDF and CEA, the project was delayed, with a decision made between 1967 and 1969. In 1969 after the departure of Charles de Gaulle, CEA gave up on the UNGG plans.

In 1973, a nearby hydroelectric plant of 63 MW was completed and the regional manager for EDF announces plans for PWRs at the same site to be finished by 1985.

In 1978, EDF announces that Golfech would be the site for 4 PWRs eventually of 1300 MWe each.

On 17 June 1979, 5,000 protesters walked on the future site and released balloons.

During summer heatwaves the power plant output had to be reduced repeatedly because the Garonne had exceeded the statutory temperature limit of 28 °C which serves to protect the aquatic ecosystem.

== Events ==
These are all 1 on the INES scale and occurred in 1998.

- on 28 September 1998 at the time of an operation check of the measuring equipment of the neutron flux in the middle of the reactor, the operator did not respond to one of the signals that should have been investigated.
- on 4 November the Autorité de sûreté nucléaire (ASN) discovered that on 14 October, EDF ran the reactor with an overpower of 7% for 30 hours.
- on 27 November the containment building is evacuated following an alarm due to an atmospheric detection of radioactivity. Ten workers are slightly contaminated.
