= Lamagistère station =

Railway station in Lamagistère, France

Coordinates: 44°07′36″N 0°49′36″E

Lamagistère

General information
- Location: Lamagistère, Tarn-et-Garonne, Occitanie, France
- Line: Bordeaux–Sète railway
- Platforms: 2
- Tracks: 2

Other information
- Station code: 87611855

Services
Preceding station	TER Occitanie	Following station
Agen Terminus	18	Valence-d'Agen towards Toulouse
Location

Lamagistère is a railway station in Lamagistère, Occitanie, France. The station is on the Bordeaux–Sète railway. The station is served by TER (local) services operated by SNCF.

== Train services ==
The following services currently call at Lamagistère:

- local service (TER Occitanie) Agen–Montauban–Toulouse
