= Sainte-Juliette =

- Commune
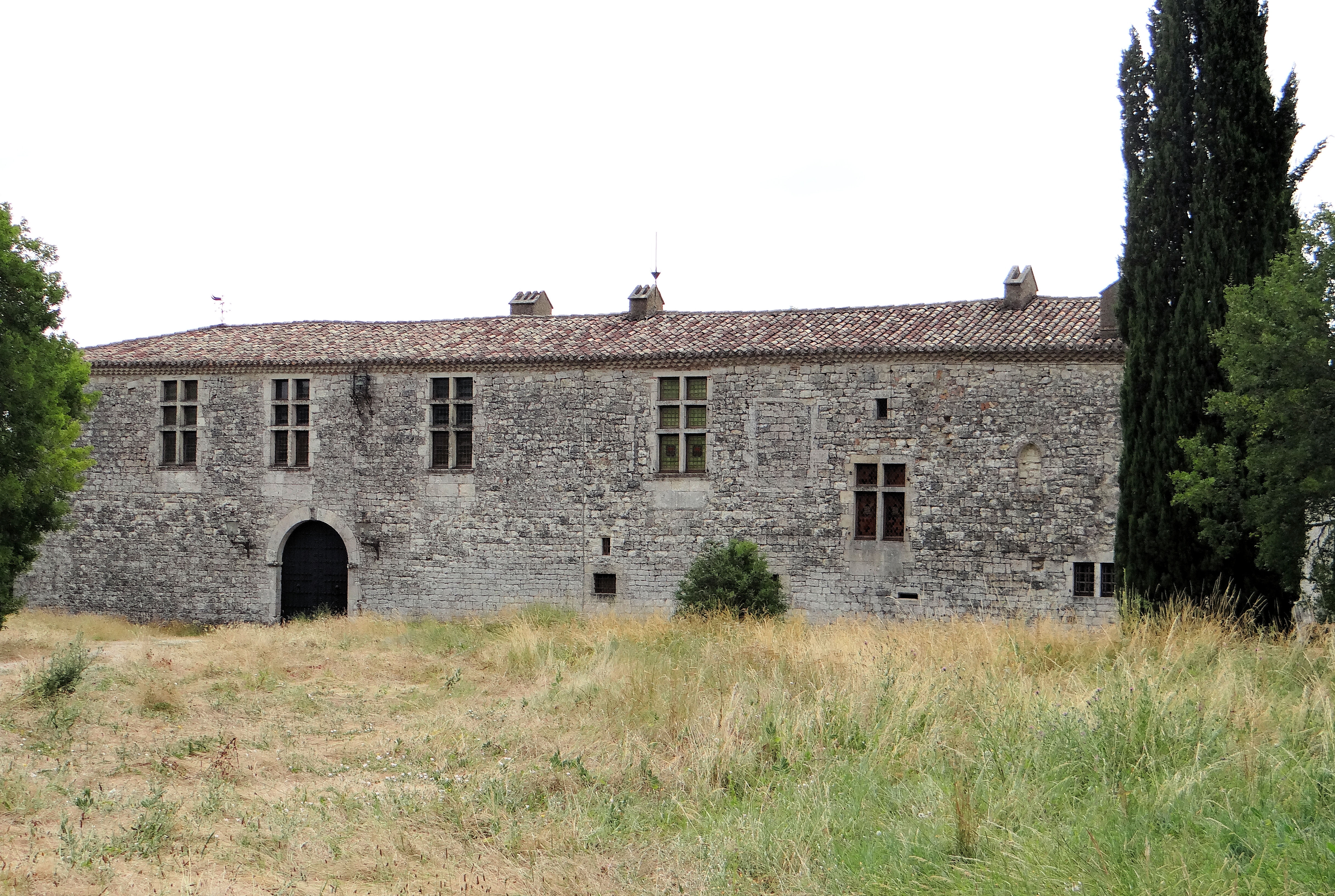
- The Château de la Barathie, in Sainte-Juliette
- Location of Sainte-Juliette
- Location within France Location within Occitanie
- Coordinates: 44°17′15″N 1°10′12″E
- Country: France
- Region: Occitania
- Department: Tarn-et-Garonne
- Arrondissement: Castelsarrasin
- Canton: Pays de Serres Sud-Quercy

Government
  - Mayor (2020–2026): Agnès Palmié
- Area^{1}: 7.3 km^{2} (2.8 sq mi)
- Elevation: 100 m (330 ft)
- Highest elevation: 243 m (797 ft)
- Lowest elevation: 115 m (377 ft)
- Population (2023): 131
  - Density: 18/km^{2} (46/sq mi)
- Time zone: UTC+01:00 (CET)
  - Summer (DST): UTC+02:00 (CEST)
- INSEE/Postal code: 82164 /82110
- ^{1} French Land Register data, which excludes lakes, ponds, glaciers > 1 km^{2} (0.386 sq mi or 247 acres) and river estuaries.

Sainte-Juliette (French pronunciation: [sɛ̃t ʒyljɛt]; Languedocien: Senta Geleda) is a commune in the Tarn-et-Garonne department in the Occitanie region in southern France.

== Geography ==
The Barguelonnette flows southwestward through the commune.

== See also ==
- Communes of the Tarn-et-Garonne department
