= Saint-Nazaire-de-Valentane =

- Commune
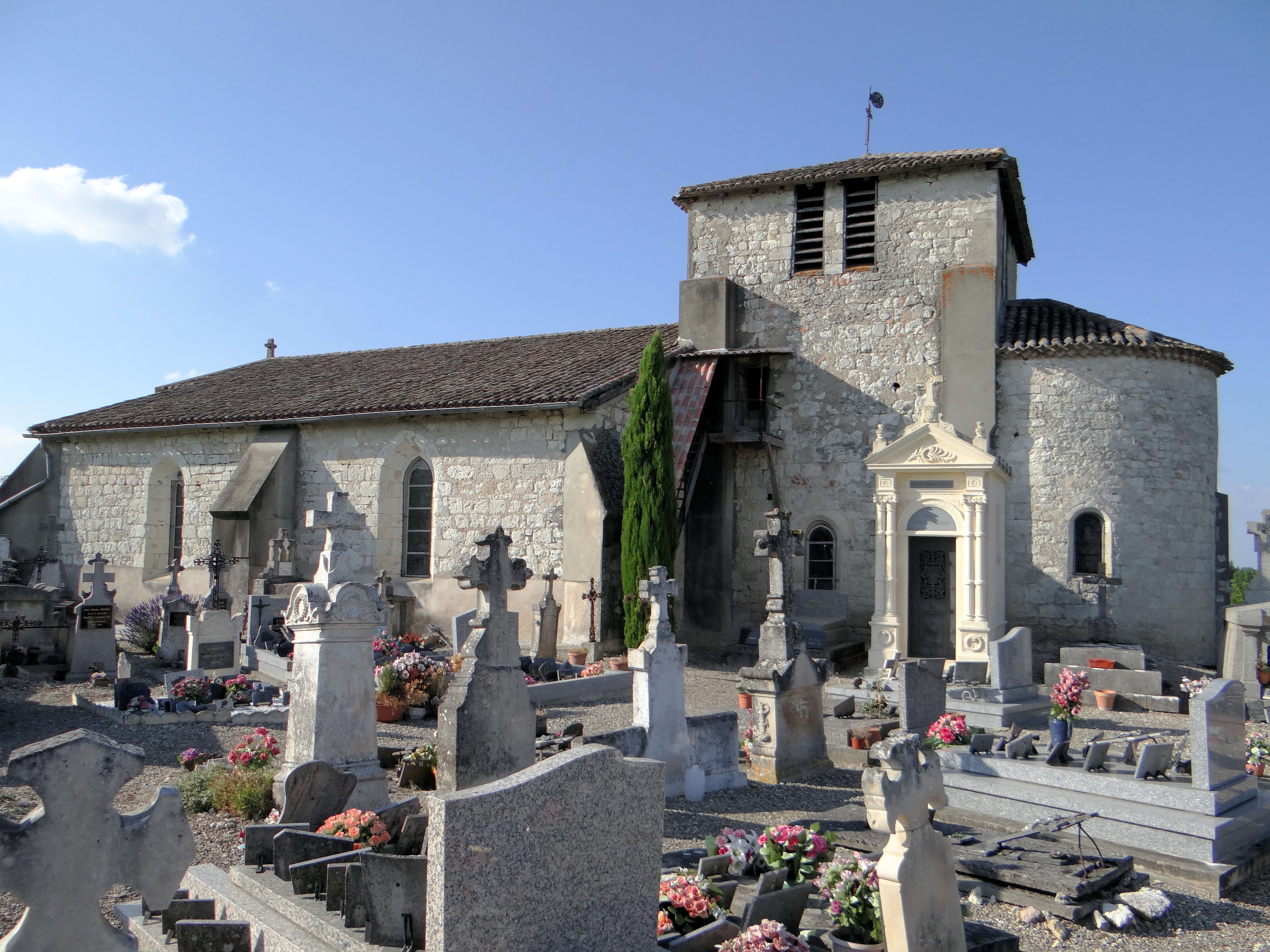
- The church of Saint-Nazaire, in Saint-Nazaire-de-Valentane

- Coat of arms
- Location of Saint-Nazaire-de-Valentane
- Location within France Location within Occitanie
- Coordinates: 44°13′22″N 1°00′46″E
- Country: France
- Region: Occitania
- Department: Tarn-et-Garonne
- Arrondissement: Castelsarrasin
- Canton: Valence

Government
  - Mayor (2020–2026): Jean-Pierre Barra
- Area^{1}: 17.44 km^{2} (6.73 sq mi)
- Elevation: 200 m (660 ft)
- Highest elevation: 207 m (679 ft)
- Lowest elevation: 74 m (243 ft)
- Population (2023): 317
  - Density: 18.2/km^{2} (47.1/sq mi)
- Time zone: UTC+01:00 (CET)
  - Summer (DST): UTC+02:00 (CEST)
- INSEE/Postal code: 82168 /82190
- ^{1} French Land Register data, which excludes lakes, ponds, glaciers > 1 km^{2} (0.386 sq mi or 247 acres) and river estuaries.

Saint-Nazaire-de-Valentane is a commune in the Tarn-et-Garonne département in the Occitanie region in southern France.

== Geography ==
The Barguelonne forms all of the commune's southeastern border.

== See also ==
- Communes of the Tarn-et-Garonne department
