= Saint-Paul-d'Espis =

- Commune
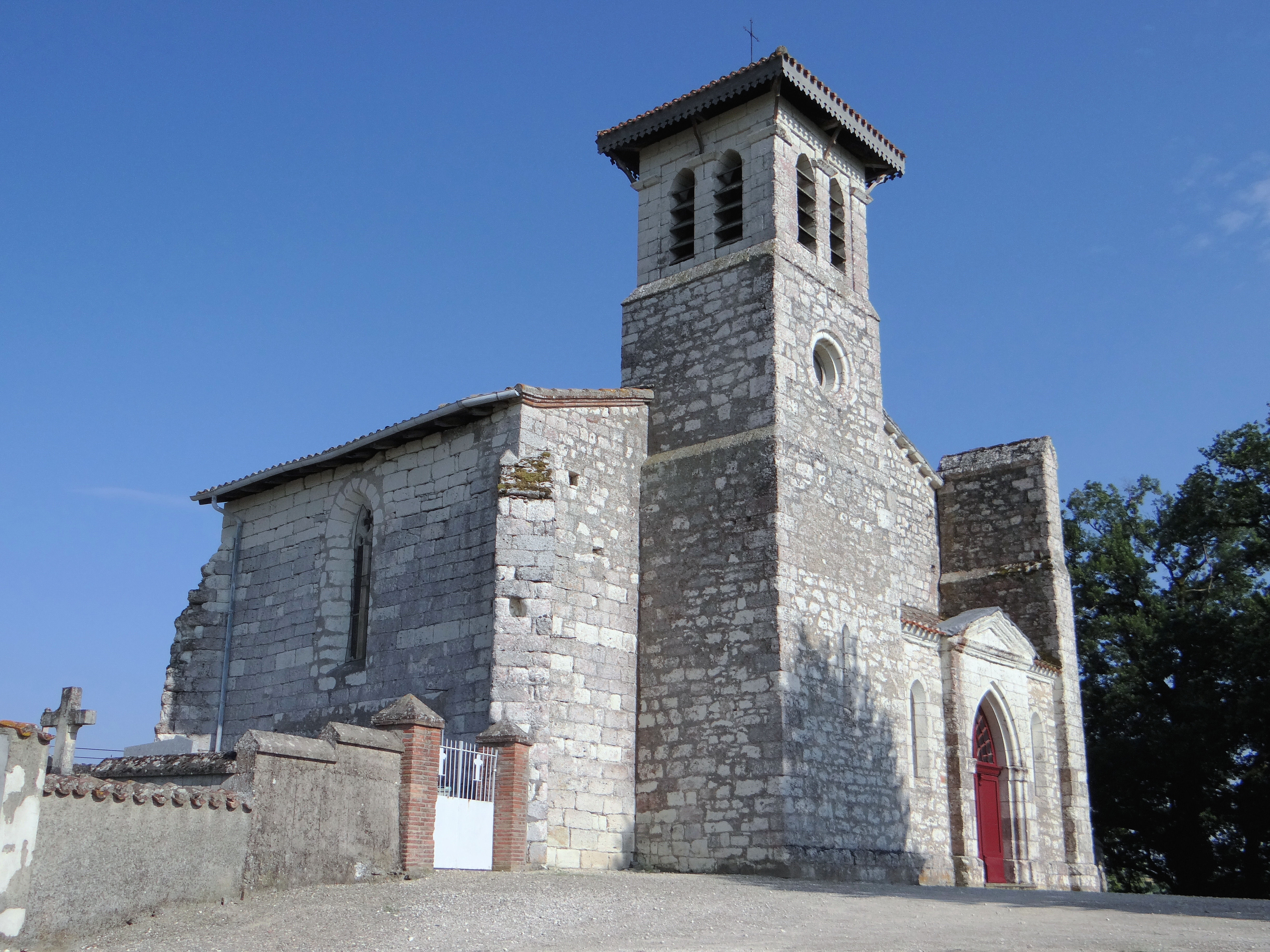
- The church of Saint-Jean de Cornac, in Saint-Paul-d'Espis

- Coat of arms
- Location of Saint-Paul-d'Espis
- Location within France Location within Occitanie
- Coordinates: 44°08′41″N 0°58′10″E
- Country: France
- Region: Occitania
- Department: Tarn-et-Garonne
- Arrondissement: Castelsarrasin
- Canton: Valence
- Intercommunality: Deux Rives

Government
  - Mayor (2020–2026): Lido Marchiol
- Area^{1}: 26.07 km^{2} (10.07 sq mi)
- Elevation: 85 m (279 ft)
- Highest elevation: 191 m (627 ft)
- Lowest elevation: 68 m (223 ft)
- Population (2023): 559
  - Density: 21.4/km^{2} (55.5/sq mi)
- Time zone: UTC+01:00 (CET)
  - Summer (DST): UTC+02:00 (CEST)
- INSEE/Postal code: 82170 /82400
- ^{1} French Land Register data, which excludes lakes, ponds, glaciers > 1 km^{2} (0.386 sq mi or 247 acres) and river estuaries.

Saint-Paul-d'Espis (Languedocien: Sent Pau dels Pins) is a commune in the Tarn-et-Garonne department in the Occitanie region in southern France.

== Geography ==
The village lies on the left bank of the Barguelonne, which forms all of the commune's northwestern border.

== See also ==
- Communes of the Tarn-et-Garonne department
