= Brassac, Tarn-et-Garonne =

Brassac
- Commune
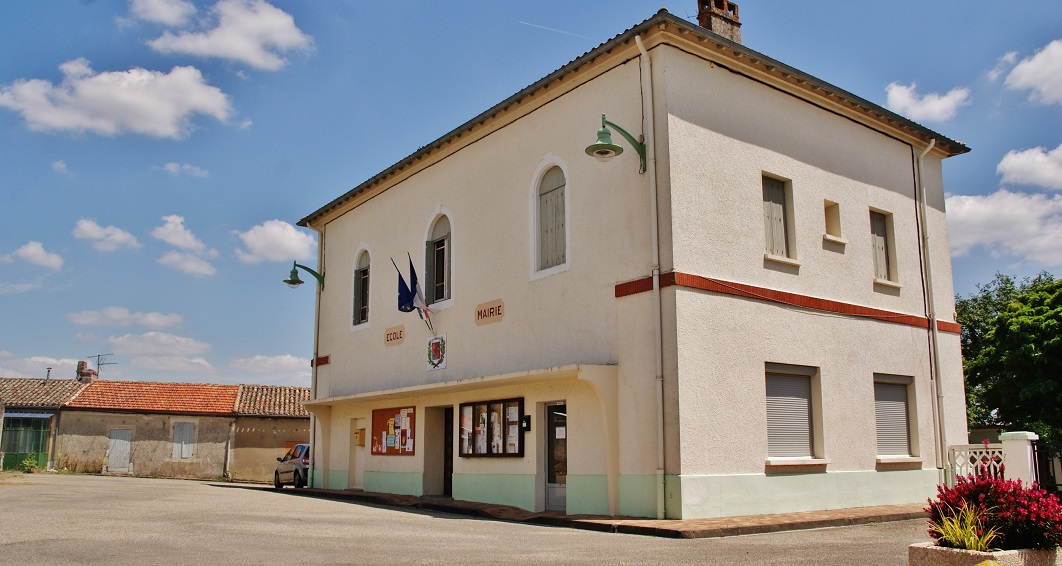

- Coat of arms
- Location of Brassac
- Location within France Location within Occitanie
- Coordinates: 44°12′56″N 0°58′25″E
- Country: France
- Region: Occitania
- Department: Tarn-et-Garonne
- Arrondissement: Castelsarrasin
- Canton: Valence

Government
  - Mayor (2020–2026): Jean-Pierre Flourens
- Area^{1}: 20.37 km^{2} (7.86 sq mi)
- Elevation: 180 m (590 ft)
- Highest elevation: 233 m (764 ft)
- Lowest elevation: 87 m (285 ft)
- Population (2023): 254
  - Density: 12.5/km^{2} (32.3/sq mi)
- Time zone: UTC+01:00 (CET)
  - Summer (DST): UTC+02:00 (CEST)
- INSEE/Postal code: 82024 /82190
- ^{1} French Land Register data, which excludes lakes, ponds, glaciers > 1 km^{2} (0.386 sq mi or 247 acres) and river estuaries.

Brassac (French pronunciation: [bʁasak]; Occitan: Braçac) is a commune in the Tarn-et-Garonne department in the Occitanie region in southern France.

== Geography ==
The Séoune flows southwestward through the middle of the commune.

== History ==
The Château de Brassac is one of the most important in the area, thanks to its excellent defensive position at the top of steep slopes, and its location on the border between Agenais and Quercy. Its importance is attested from the twelfth century, it was a barony.

It then belonged to the Planels, vassals of the Duke of Aquitaine but established on the lands of the Count of Toulouse, who became its owner before 1190. An eventful history then made it pass into the hands of the English and then again to the Count of Toulouse in 1200, then again on the English side.

Bertrand de Galard, son of Eléonore d'Armagnac, paid homage to King Henry II of England in 1266 and 1291 for this castle. From there the family of Galard de Brassac allied itself with the principal families of the surroundings.

In 1508 François de Galard de Brassac married Jeanne de Béarn. Their descendants take the name of Galard de Béarn de Brassac, the Château de Brassac being only one of the many possessions of this family.

The castle is nowadays an imposing residence rebuilt in the 15th and 16th centuries, which can be visited.

== See also ==
- Communes of the Tarn-et-Garonne department
