= Bourg-de-Visa =

- Commune
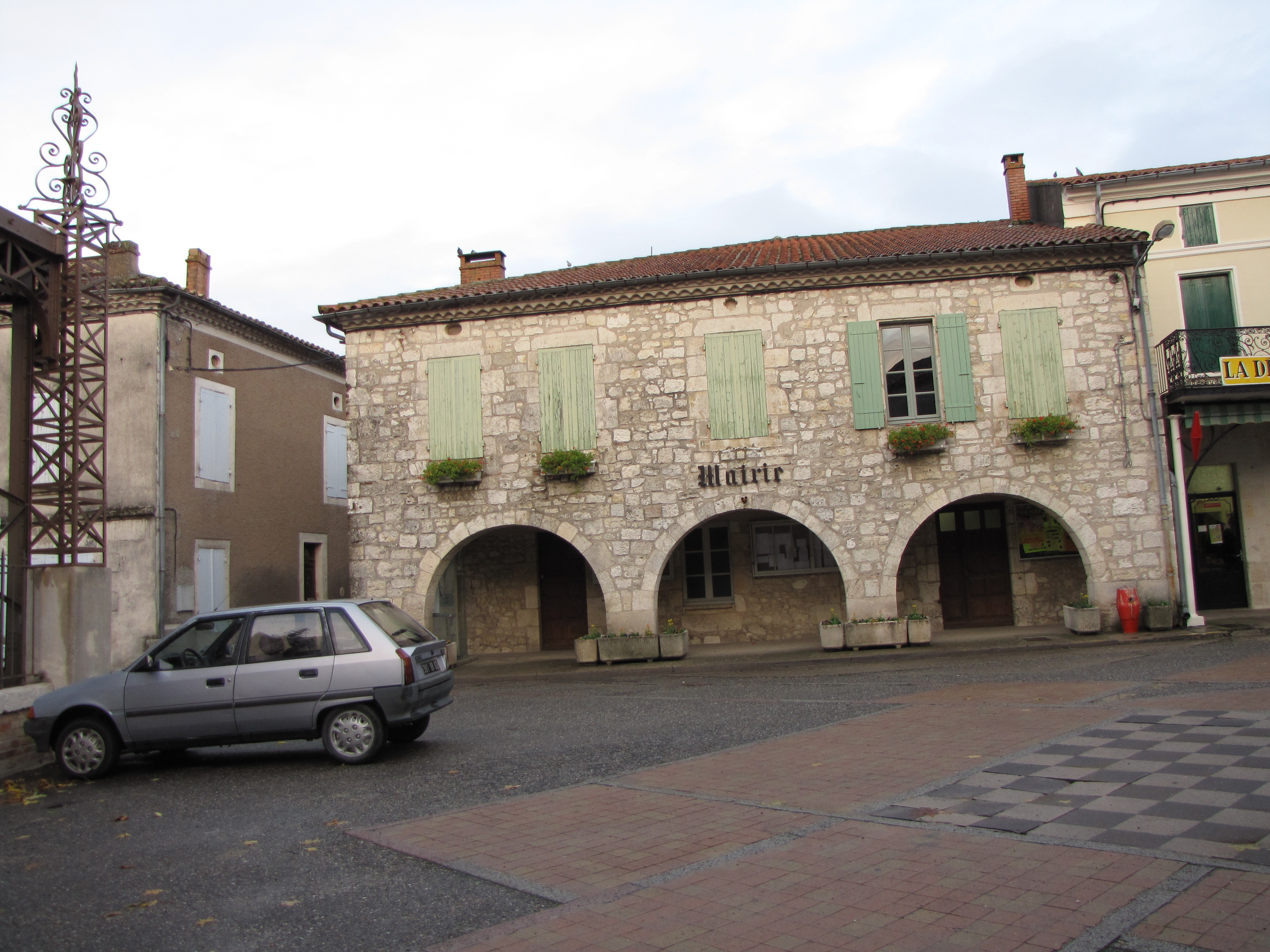
- Bourg-de-Visa village hall

- Coat of arms
- Location of Bourg-de-Visa
- Location within France Location within Occitanie
- Coordinates: 44°15′49″N 0°57′31″E
- Country: France
- Region: Occitania
- Department: Tarn-et-Garonne
- Arrondissement: Castelsarrasin
- Canton: Valence
- Intercommunality: Pays de Serres en Quercy

Government
  - Mayor (2020–2026): Arlette Laine
- Area^{1}: 14.41 km^{2} (5.56 sq mi)
- Elevation: 228 m (748 ft)
- Highest elevation: 233 m (764 ft)
- Lowest elevation: 115 m (377 ft)
- Population (2023): 396
  - Density: 27.5/km^{2} (71.2/sq mi)
- Time zone: UTC+01:00 (CET)
  - Summer (DST): UTC+02:00 (CEST)
- INSEE/Postal code: 82022 /82190
- ^{1} French Land Register data, which excludes lakes, ponds, glaciers > 1 km^{2} (0.386 sq mi or 247 acres) and river estuaries.

Bourg-de-Visa (French pronunciation: [buʁ də viza]; Occitan: Lo Borg Devisac) is a commune in the Tarn-et-Garonne department in the Occitanie region in southern France.

== See also ==
- Communes of the Tarn-et-Garonne department
