= Saint-Vincent-Lespinasse =

- Commune
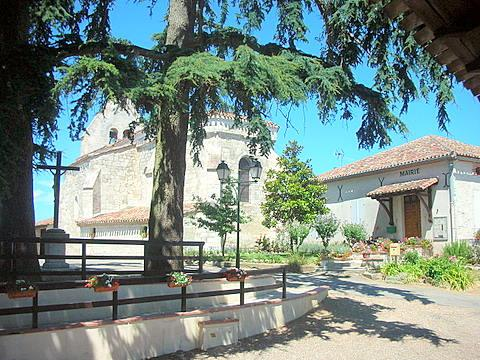
- The church and town hall of Saint-Vincent-Lespinasse

- Coat of arms
- Location of Saint-Vincent-Lespinasse
- Location within France Location within Occitanie
- Coordinates: 44°07′09″N 0°57′14″E
- Country: France
- Region: Occitania
- Department: Tarn-et-Garonne
- Arrondissement: Castelsarrasin
- Canton: Valence
- Intercommunality: Deux Rives

Government
  - Mayor (2020–2026): Serge Boyer
- Area^{1}: 9.44 km^{2} (3.64 sq mi)
- Elevation: 185 m (607 ft)
- Highest elevation: 185 m (607 ft)
- Lowest elevation: 67 m (220 ft)
- Population (2023): 284
  - Density: 30.1/km^{2} (77.9/sq mi)
- Time zone: UTC+01:00 (CET)
  - Summer (DST): UTC+02:00 (CEST)
- INSEE/Postal code: 82175 /82400
- ^{1} French Land Register data, which excludes lakes, ponds, glaciers > 1 km^{2} (0.386 sq mi or 247 acres) and river estuaries.

Saint-Vincent-Lespinasse (French pronunciation: [sɛ̃ vɛ̃sɑ̃ lɛspinas]; Occitan: Sent Vincenç de l'Espinassa) is a commune in the Tarn-et-Garonne department in the Occitanie region in southern France.

== Geography ==
The Barguelonne forms part of the commune's northern border.

== See also ==
- Communes of the Tarn-et-Garonne department
