= Valence, Tarn-et-Garonne =

Valence d'Agen
- Commune
- Coat of arms
- Location of Valence d'Agen
- Location within France Location within Occitanie
- Coordinates: 44°06′40″N 0°53′25″E
- Country: France
- Region: Occitania
- Department: Tarn-et-Garonne
- Arrondissement: Castelsarrasin
- Canton: Valence
- Intercommunality: Deux Rives

Government
  - Mayor (2020–2026): Jean-Michel Baylet
- Area^{1}: 13.44 km^{2} (5.19 sq mi)
- Elevation: 66 m (217 ft)
- Highest elevation: 186 m (610 ft)
- Lowest elevation: 56 m (184 ft)
- Population (2023): 5,289
  - Density: 393.5/km^{2} (1,019/sq mi)
- Time zone: UTC+01:00 (CET)
  - Summer (DST): UTC+02:00 (CEST)
- INSEE/Postal code: 82186 /82400
- ^{1} French Land Register data, which excludes lakes, ponds, glaciers > 1 km^{2} (0.386 sq mi or 247 acres) and river estuaries.

Valence d'Agen (French pronunciation: [valɑ̃s]; Occitan: Valença d'Agen), is a commune in the Tarn-et-Garonne department in the Occitanie region in southern France.

== Geography ==
Valence d'Agen is located 25 km (16 mi) from Agen, 45 km (28 mi) from Montauban, 60 km (37 mi) from Cahors, 90 km (56 mi) from Toulouse and 160 km (99 mi) from Bordeaux.

The departmental road D813 passes through the town. Until 2008 the road, which runs between Toulouse and Bordeaux, was classified as a National Road N113 until replaced by the Autoroute. Exit 8 off the autoroute A62, which runs between Bordeaux and Toulouse, lies a few kilometres south of town. A voie verte, a path open to walkers and cyclists which runs along the Canal Latéral de la Garonne that passes through the southern edge of the town.

Valence-d'Agen station is situated on the northern edge of the town, on the D813. It lies on the Bordeaux-Toulouse line.

The Barguelonne flows westward through the northern part of the commune and forms part of its north-eastern and north-western borders.

== Population ==
Historical population
Year	Pop.	±% p.a.
1968	3,867	—
1975	4,058	+0.69%
1982	4,408	+1.19%
1990	4,901	+1.33%
1999	4,783	−0.27%
2007	5,077	+0.75%
2012	5,155	+0.31%
2017	5,221	+0.25%
2023	5,289	+0.22%
Source: INSEE

== History ==
A Bastide town with English origins, founded in the 13th century by Edward I, King of England when he was also the ruler of Aquitane. Valence d'Agen is a small town, easy to stroll around and discover its heritage. Water from the Garonne river feeds small and large fountains scattered throughout the city, and flows through its many Lavoir of which 3 remain. The oldest Lavoir is that of Théron, remarkable for its circular roof. Dating is uncertain but it was in place at the end of the 18th century. Restorations in 1880 saw the appearance of tiling, for the sake of resistance to frost. The Saint-Bernard Lavoir was originally equipped with a drinking trough. Its construction, shortly after 1807, coincided with the filling in of the overly muddy ponds of the Plaça (current Jean-Baptiste-Chaumeil). In compensation, a Lavoir was built which made it possible to water the cattle and horses of the imperial gendarmes. A roof was added in 1924 to keep the washers from inclement weather. The roof and the brickwork have recently been restored. The wash house of Pé de Gleyze, dating from the 19th century, is built in a more traditional format than the others.

== Twinned Cities ==
La Vall d'Uixó, a Spanish town of about 35,000 located in the Province of Castellón, has been a twin city to Valence since September 1990. The Spanish twin to Valence, France lies about 45 km due north of Valencia, Spain and forms part of the Spanish autonomous region known as the Valencian Community.

== See also ==
- Communes of the Tarn-et-Garonne department
