= Boudou =

- Commune
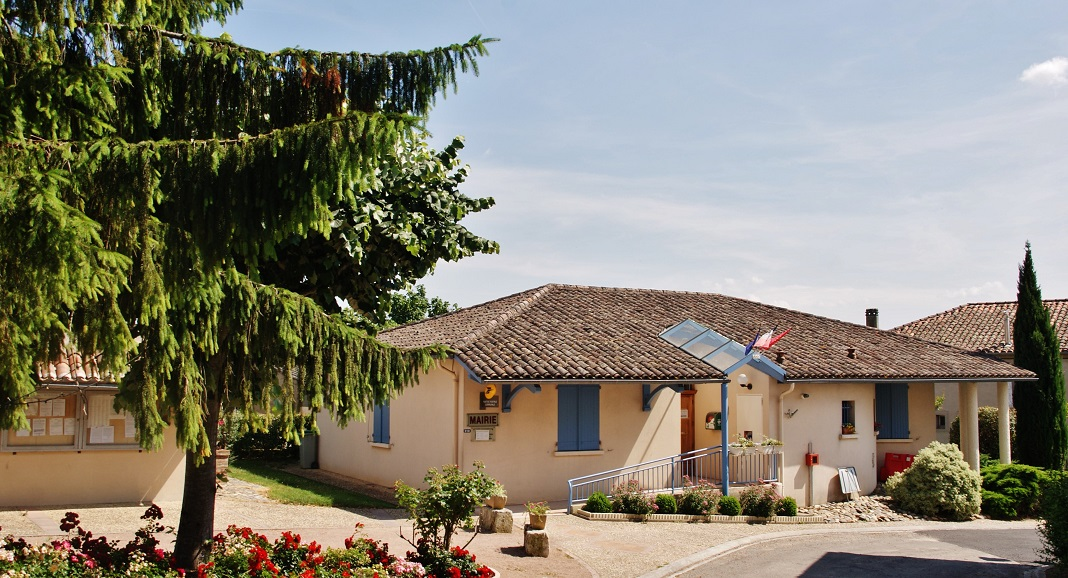
- Town hall

- Coat of arms
- Location of Boudou
- Location within France Location within Occitanie
- Coordinates: 44°05′49″N 1°00′52″E
- Country: France
- Region: Occitania
- Department: Tarn-et-Garonne
- Arrondissement: Castelsarrasin
- Canton: Valence
- Intercommunality: CC Terres des Confluences

Government
  - Mayor (2020–2026): Marie-Thérèse Vissières
- Area^{1}: 12.3 km^{2} (4.7 sq mi)
- Elevation: 176 m (577 ft)
- Highest elevation: 194 m (636 ft)
- Lowest elevation: 62 m (203 ft)
- Population (2023): 757
  - Density: 61.5/km^{2} (159/sq mi)
- Time zone: UTC+01:00 (CET)
  - Summer (DST): UTC+02:00 (CEST)
- INSEE/Postal code: 82019 /82200
- ^{1} French Land Register data, which excludes lakes, ponds, glaciers > 1 km^{2} (0.386 sq mi or 247 acres) and river estuaries.

Boudou (French pronunciation: [budu]; Occitan: Bodon) is a commune in the Tarn-et-Garonne department in the Occitanie region in southern France.

Boudou is located near the confluence of the rivers Tarn and Garonne.

== Landscape ==
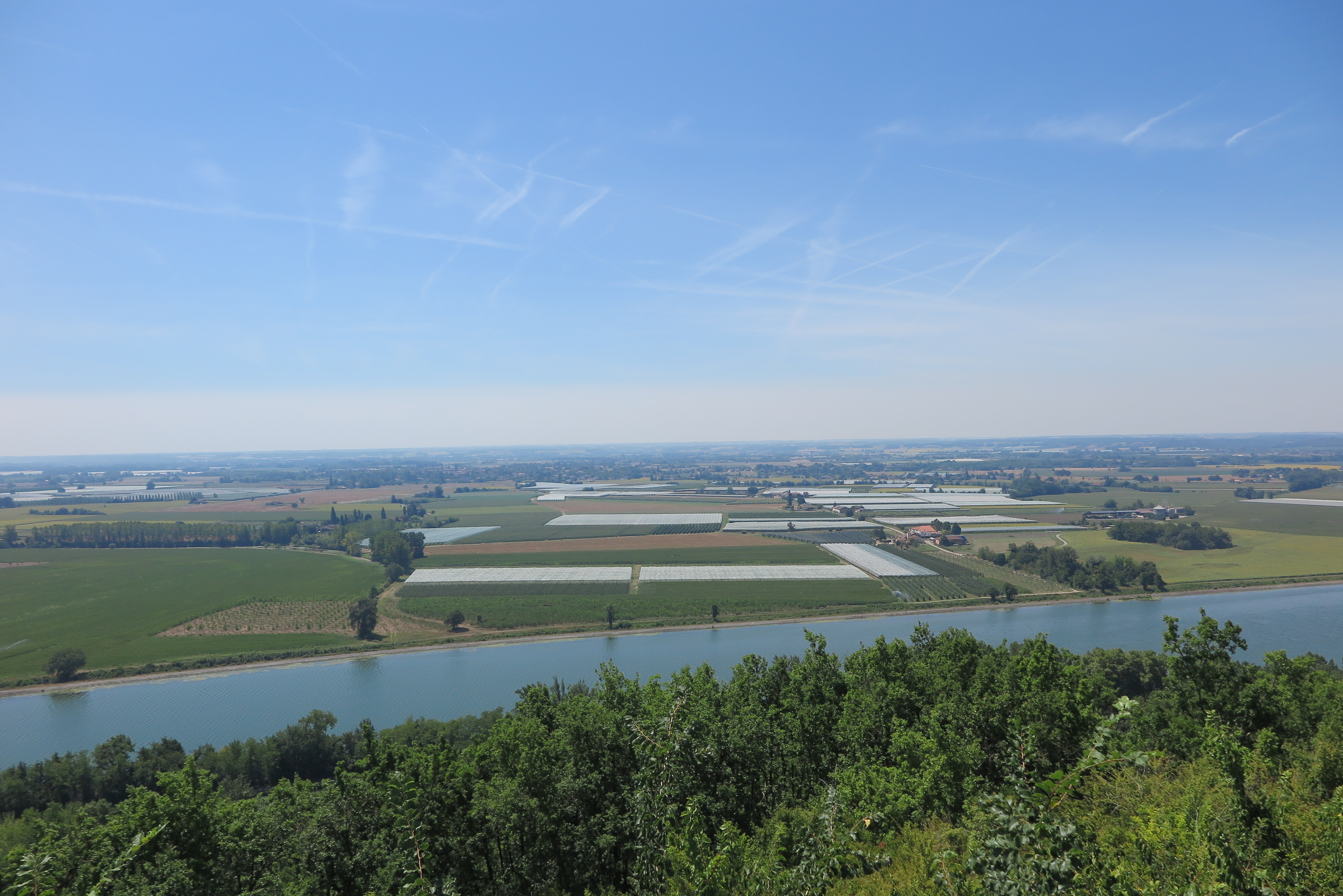

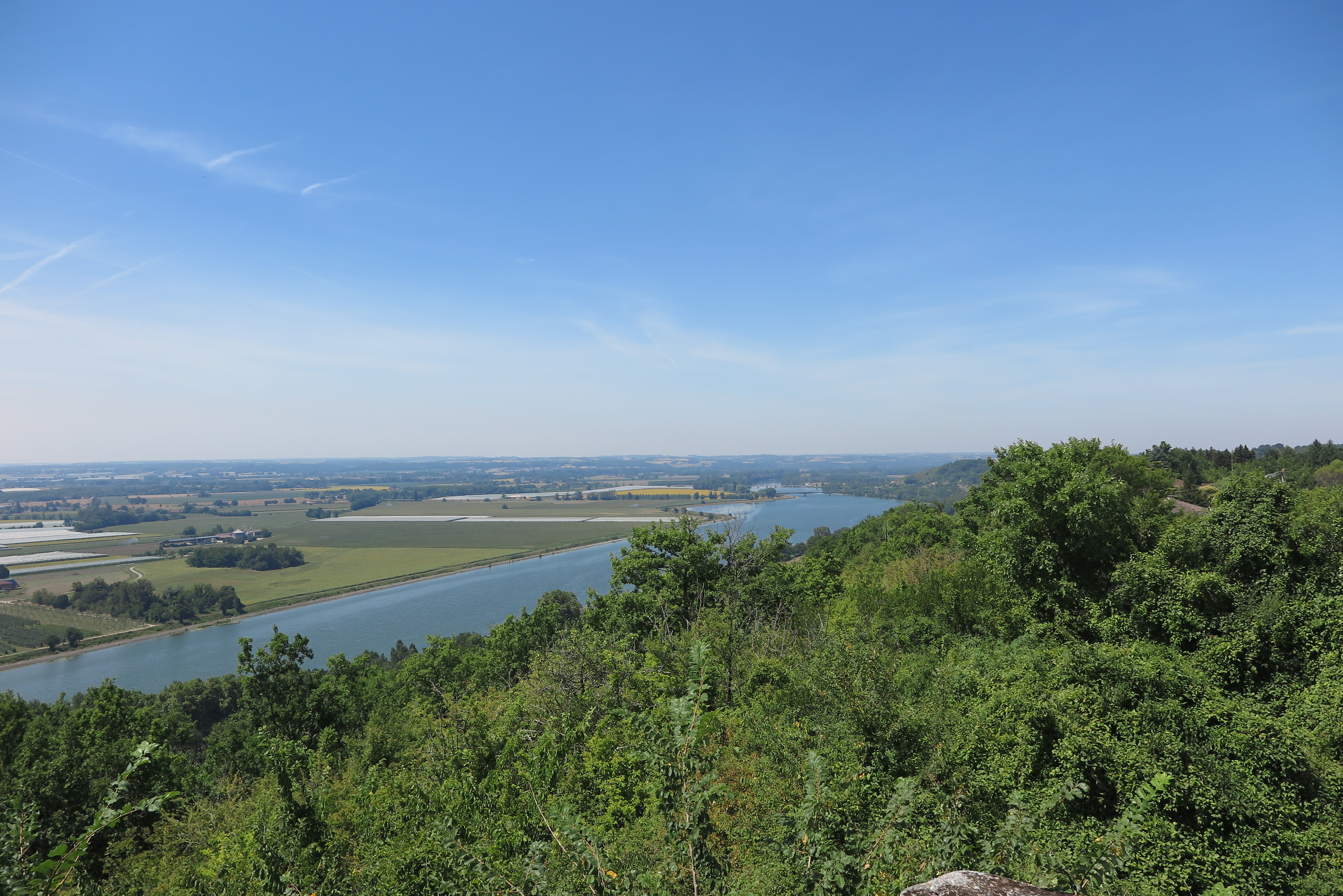

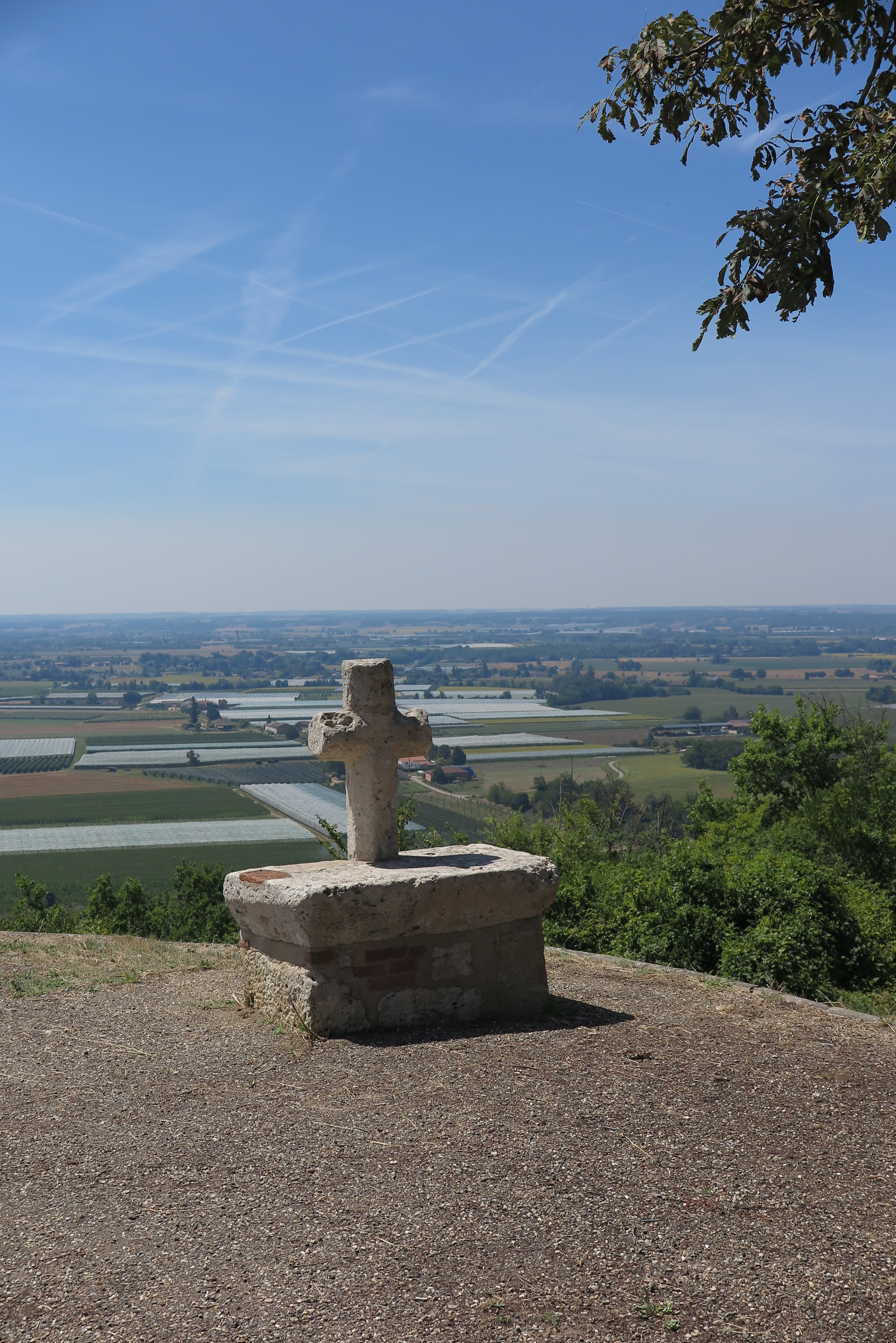

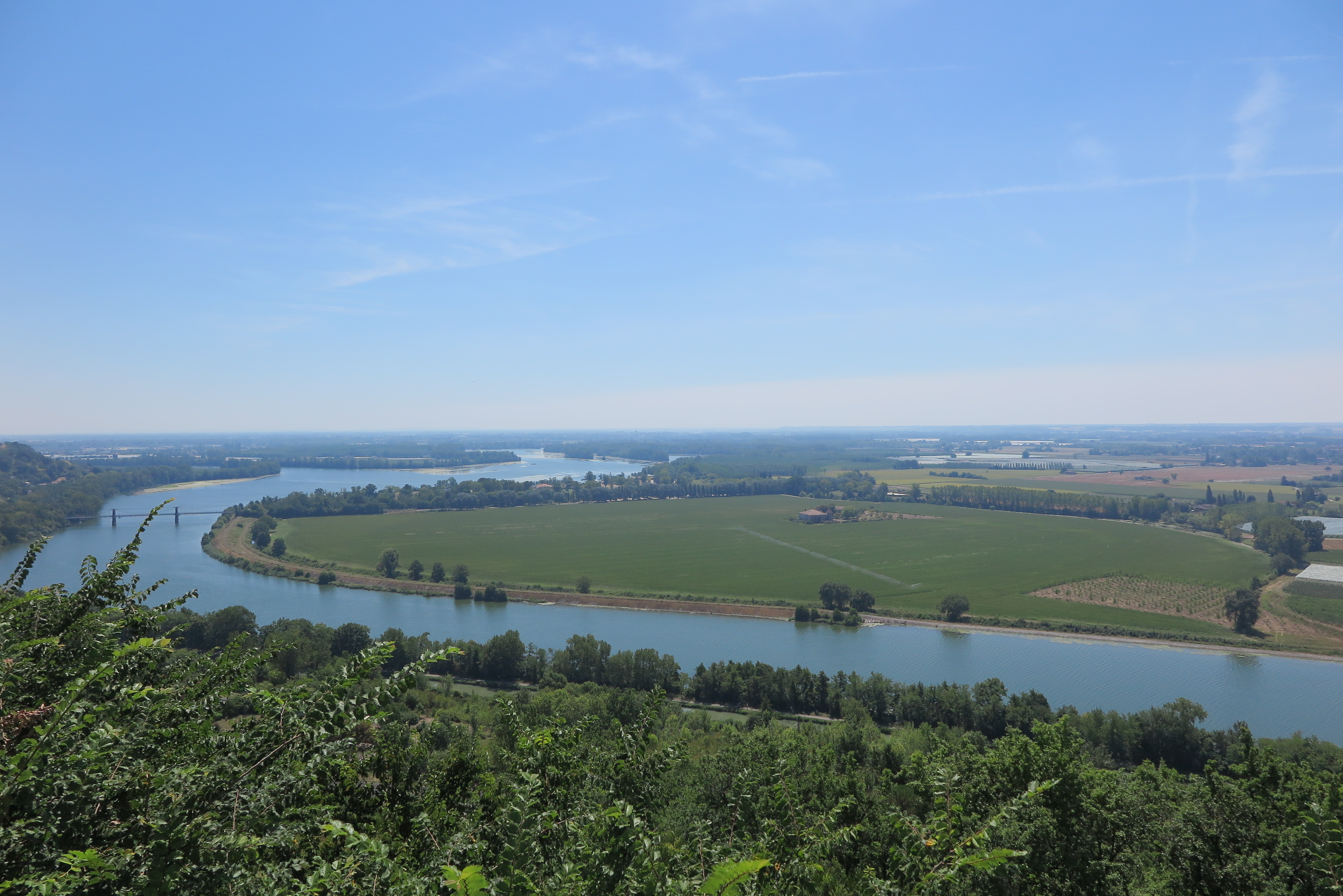

== See also ==
- Communes of the Tarn-et-Garonne department
