= Montagudet =

- Commune
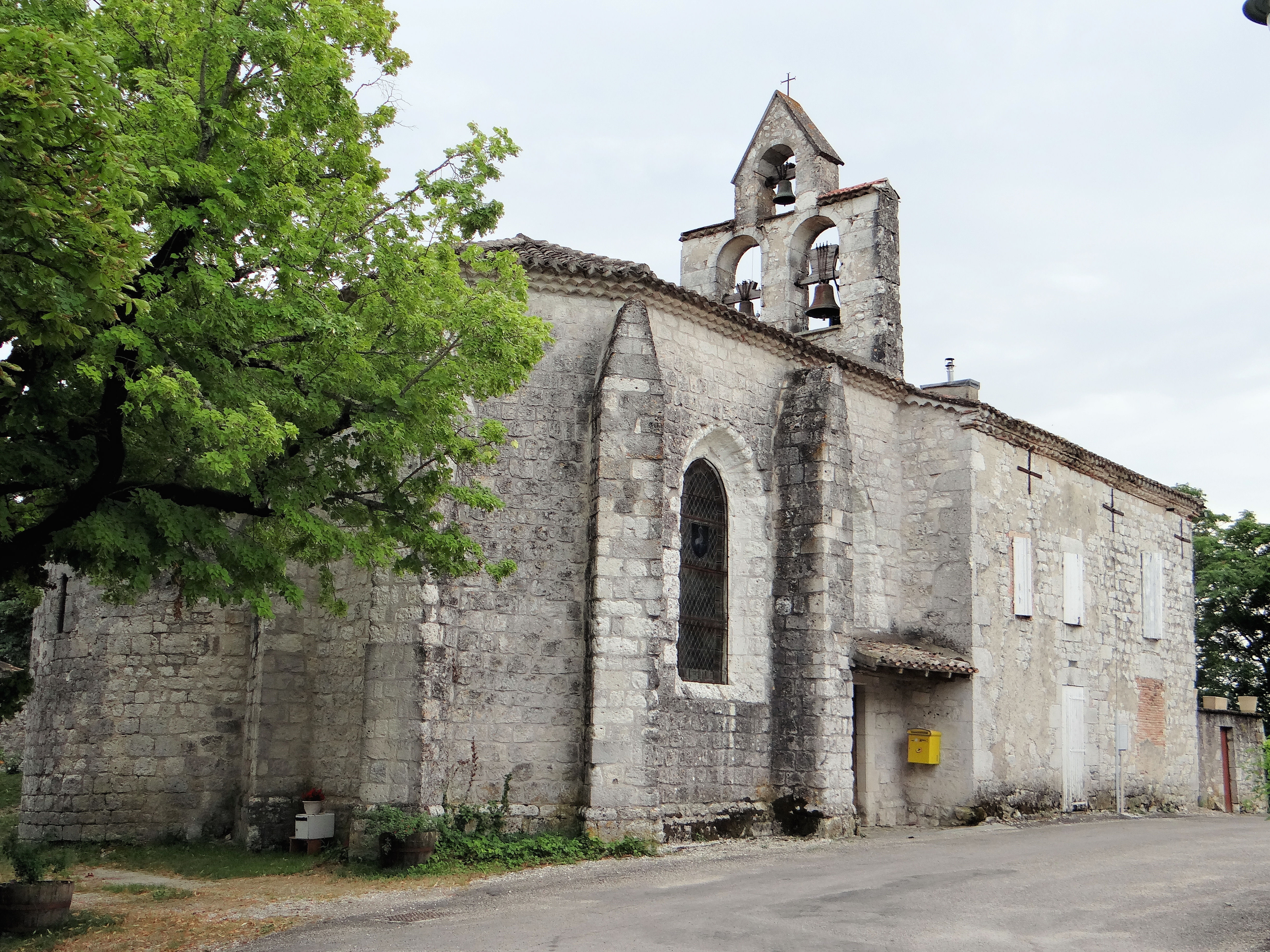
- The church of Saint-Sulpice-de-Bourges, in Montagudet
- Location of Montagudet
- Location within France Location within Occitanie
- Coordinates: 44°14′42″N 1°05′32″E
- Country: France
- Region: Occitania
- Department: Tarn-et-Garonne
- Arrondissement: Castelsarrasin
- Canton: Pays de Serres Sud-Quercy
- Intercommunality: Pays de Serres en Quercy

Government
  - Mayor (2020–2026): Jean Benois
- Area^{1}: 12.18 km^{2} (4.70 sq mi)
- Elevation: 200 m (660 ft)
- Highest elevation: 237 m (778 ft)
- Lowest elevation: 91 m (299 ft)
- Population (2023): 199
  - Density: 16.3/km^{2} (42.3/sq mi)
- Time zone: UTC+01:00 (CET)
  - Summer (DST): UTC+02:00 (CEST)
- INSEE/Postal code: 82116 /82110
- ^{1} French Land Register data, which excludes lakes, ponds, glaciers > 1 km^{2} (0.386 sq mi or 247 acres) and river estuaries.

Montagudet (French pronunciation: [mɔ̃taɡydɛ]) is a commune in the Tarn-et-Garonne department in the Occitanie region in southern France.

== Geography ==
The Séoune forms part of the commune's northern border. The Barguelonnette forms most of the commune's southern border.

== See also ==
- Communes of the Tarn-et-Garonne department
