= Sauveterre, Tarn-et-Garonne =

Sauveterre
- Commune
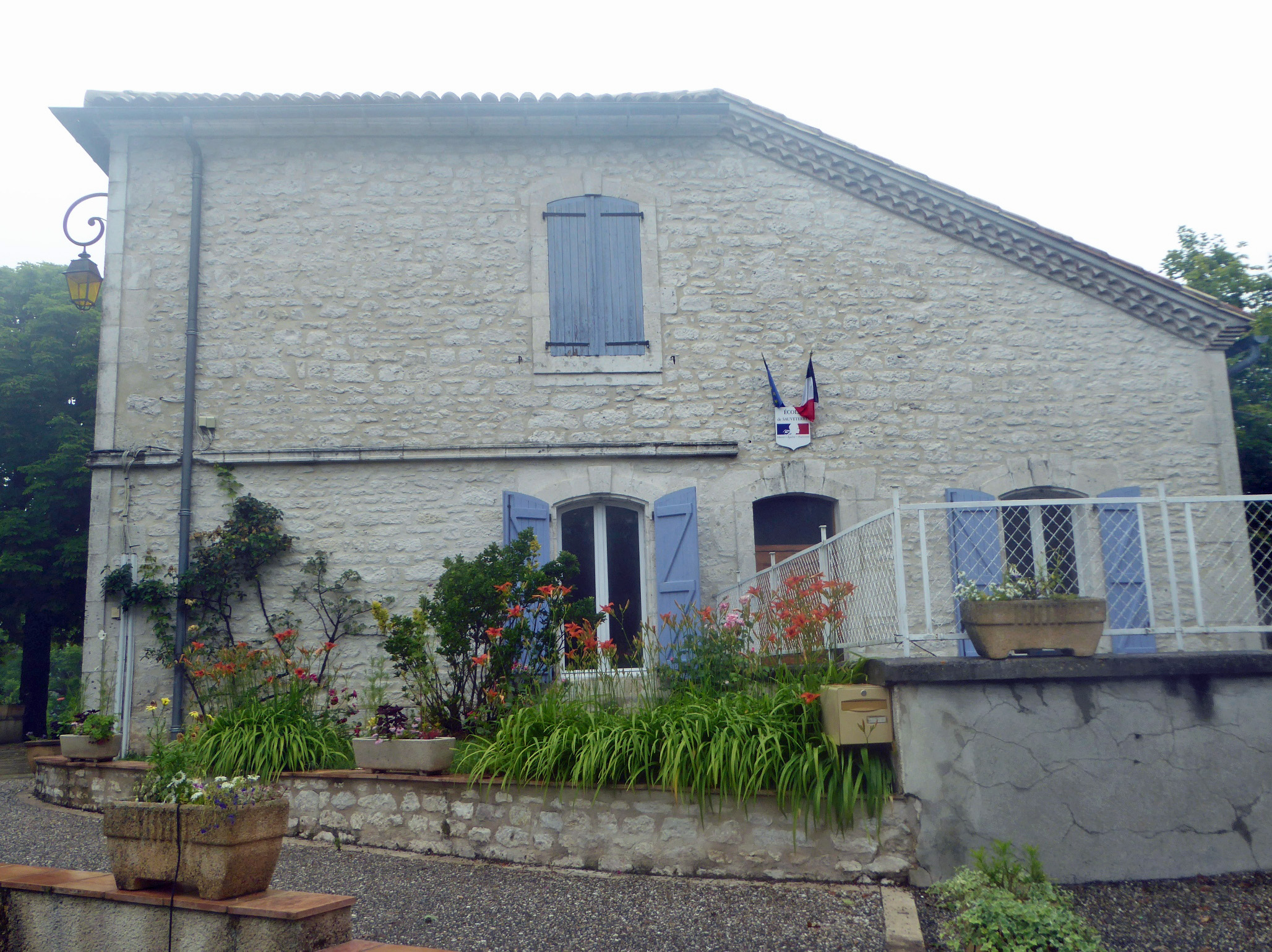
- Sauveterre Town hall

- Coat of arms
- Location of Sauveterre
- Location within France Location within Occitanie
- Coordinates: 44°16′01″N 1°16′21″E
- Country: France
- Region: Occitania
- Department: Tarn-et-Garonne
- Arrondissement: Castelsarrasin
- Canton: Pays de Serres Sud-Quercy

Government
  - Mayor (2021–2026): Anne-Marie Pouillon
- Area^{1}: 17.4 km^{2} (6.7 sq mi)
- Elevation: 237 m (778 ft)
- Highest elevation: 270 m (890 ft)
- Lowest elevation: 133 m (436 ft)
- Population (2023): 154
  - Density: 8.85/km^{2} (22.9/sq mi)
- Time zone: UTC+01:00 (CET)
  - Summer (DST): UTC+02:00 (CEST)
- INSEE/Postal code: 82177 /82110
- ^{1} French Land Register data, which excludes lakes, ponds, glaciers > 1 km^{2} (0.386 sq mi or 247 acres) and river estuaries.

Sauveterre (French pronunciation: [sovtɛʁ]; Occitan: Salvatèrra) is a commune in the Tarn-et-Garonne department in the Occitanie region in southern France.

== Geography ==
The Barguelonne flows westward through the commune.

== See also ==
- Communes of the Tarn-et-Garonne department
