= Bouloc-en-Quercy =

- Commune
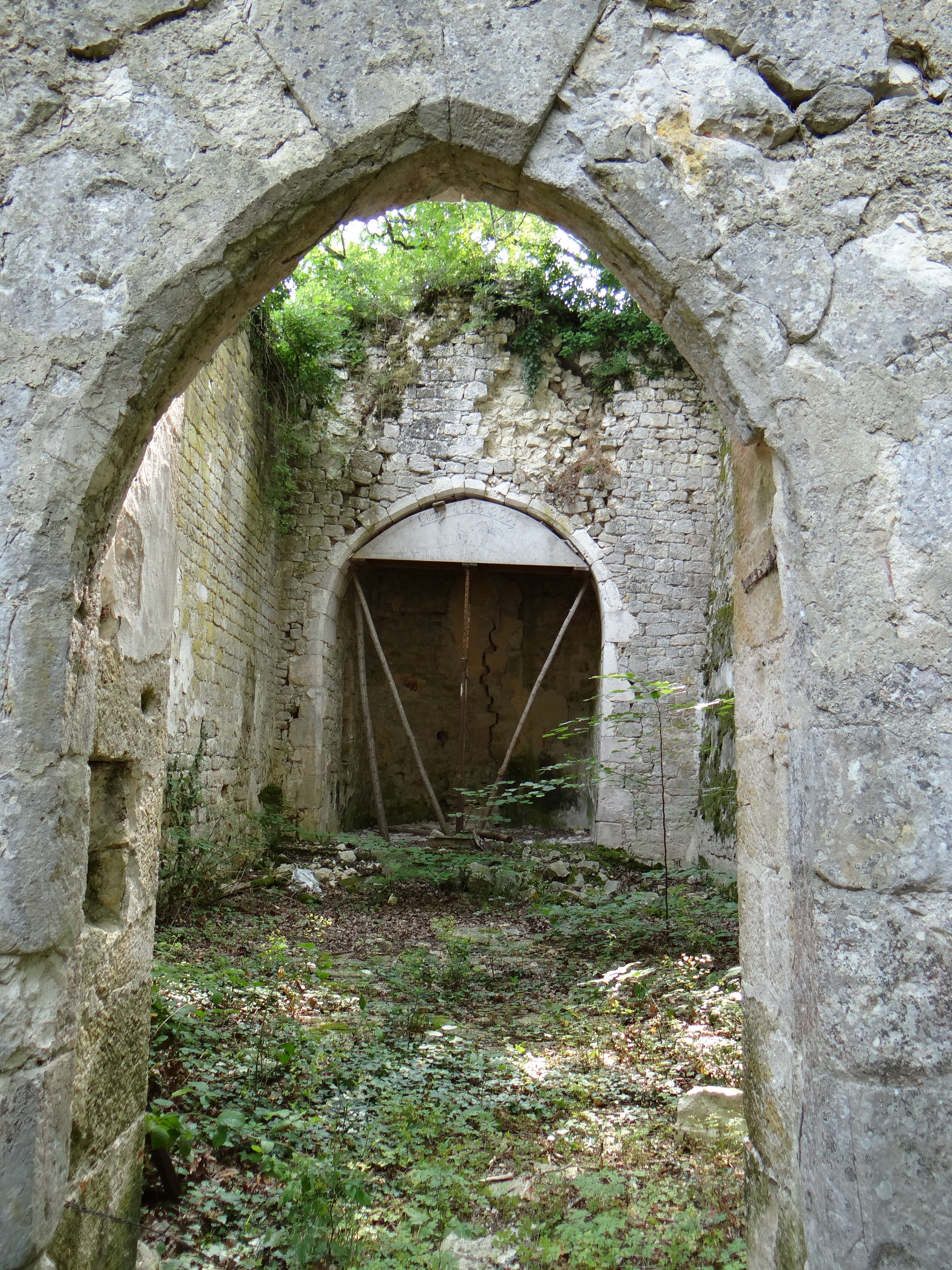
- The remains of the chapel of Saint-Caprais, in Bouloc
- Location of Bouloc-en-Quercy
- Location within France Location within Occitanie
- Coordinates: 44°18′01″N 1°07′38″E
- Country: France
- Region: Occitania
- Department: Tarn-et-Garonne
- Arrondissement: Castelsarrasin
- Canton: Pays de Serres Sud-Quercy

Government
  - Mayor (2020–2026): Dominique Tafoureau
- Area^{1}: 14.81 km^{2} (5.72 sq mi)
- Elevation: 240 m (790 ft)
- Highest elevation: 265 m (869 ft)
- Lowest elevation: 116 m (381 ft)
- Population (2023): 196
  - Density: 13.2/km^{2} (34.3/sq mi)
- Time zone: UTC+01:00 (CET)
  - Summer (DST): UTC+02:00 (CEST)
- INSEE/Postal code: 82021 /82110
- ^{1} French Land Register data, which excludes lakes, ponds, glaciers > 1 km^{2} (0.386 sq mi or 247 acres) and river estuaries.

Bouloc-en-Quercy (French pronunciation: [bulɔk ɑ̃ kɛʁsi], literally Bouloc in Quercy; before 2017: Bouloc; Languedocien: Bonlòc) is a commune in the Tarn-et-Garonne department in the Occitanie region in southern France.

== Geography ==
The Séoune forms parts of the commune's western border. The Barguelonnette forms parts of the commune's southern border.

== See also ==
- Communes of the Tarn-et-Garonne department
