= Miramont-de-Quercy =

- Commune
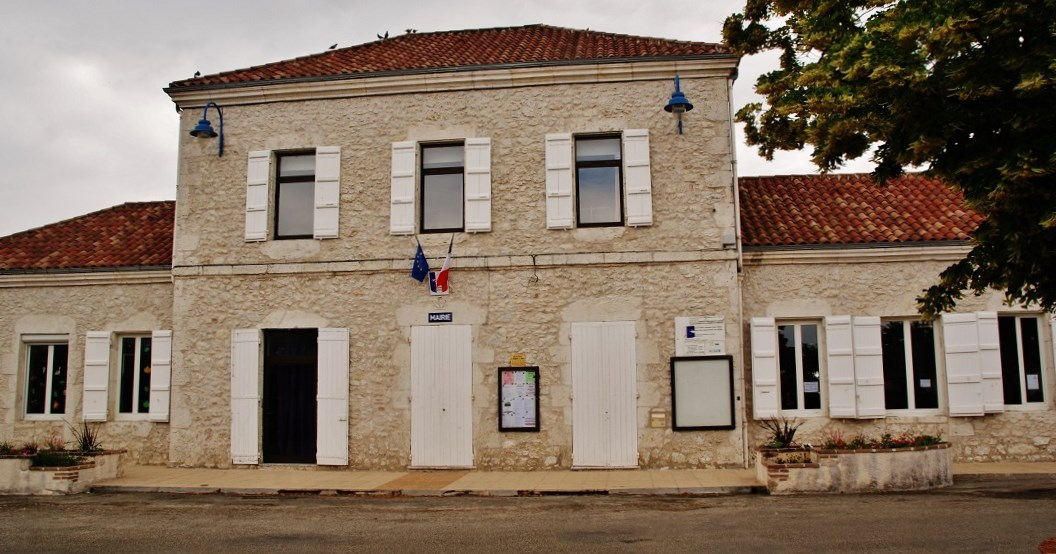
- Town hall

- Coat of arms
- Location of Miramont-de-Quercy
- Location within France Location within Occitanie
- Coordinates: 44°13′52″N 1°04′00″E
- Country: France
- Region: Occitania
- Department: Tarn-et-Garonne
- Arrondissement: Castelsarrasin
- Canton: Pays de Serres Sud-Quercy

Government
  - Mayor (2024–2026): Jean-Claude Castanié
- Area^{1}: 14.9 km^{2} (5.8 sq mi)
- Elevation: 197 m (646 ft)
- Highest elevation: 224 m (735 ft)
- Lowest elevation: 81 m (266 ft)
- Population (2023): 304
  - Density: 20.4/km^{2} (52.8/sq mi)
- Time zone: UTC+01:00 (CET)
  - Summer (DST): UTC+02:00 (CEST)
- INSEE/Postal code: 82111 /82190
- ^{1} French Land Register data, which excludes lakes, ponds, glaciers > 1 km^{2} (0.386 sq mi or 247 acres) and river estuaries.

Miramont-de-Quercy (French pronunciation: [miʁamɔ̃ də kɛʁsi], literally Miramont of Quercy; Languedocien: Miramont de Carcin) is a commune in the Tarn-et-Garonne department in the Occitanie region in southern France.

== Geography ==
The Séoune forms most of the commune's northern border. The Petite Barguelonne forms all of the commune's south-eastern border, then flows into the Barguelonne.

== See also ==
- Communes of the Tarn-et-Garonne department
