= Saint-Amans-de-Pellagal =

- Commune
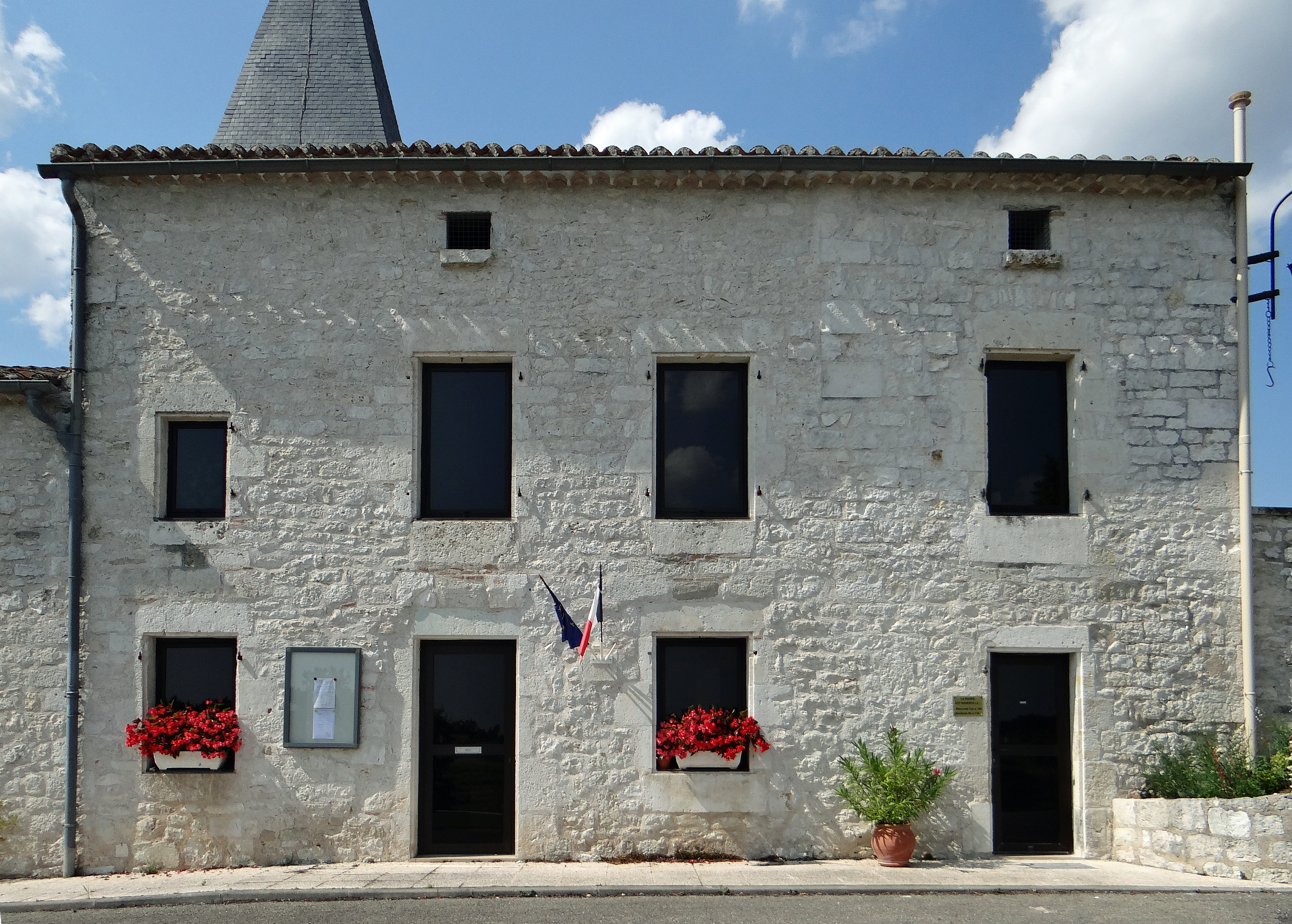
- Town hall
- Location of Saint-Amans-de-Pellagal
- Location within France Location within Occitanie
- Coordinates: 44°13′44″N 1°06′33″E
- Country: France
- Region: Occitania
- Department: Tarn-et-Garonne
- Arrondissement: Castelsarrasin
- Canton: Pays de Serres Sud-Quercy

Government
  - Mayor (2020–2026): Pascal Aurientis
- Area^{1}: 14.51 km^{2} (5.60 sq mi)
- Elevation: 200 m (660 ft)
- Highest elevation: 227 m (745 ft)
- Lowest elevation: 93 m (305 ft)
- Population (2023): 217
  - Density: 15.0/km^{2} (38.7/sq mi)
- Time zone: UTC+01:00 (CET)
  - Summer (DST): UTC+02:00 (CEST)
- INSEE/Postal code: 82154 /82110
- ^{1} French Land Register data, which excludes lakes, ponds, glaciers > 1 km^{2} (0.386 sq mi or 247 acres) and river estuaries.

Saint-Amans-de-Pellagal (Languedocien: Sent Amanç de Pelagal) is a commune in the Occitanie region in southern France, in the Tarn-et-Garonne department.

== Geography ==
The Petite Barguelonne forms part of the commune's northern border; the Barguelonne forms most of its southern border.

== See also ==
- Communes of the Tarn-et-Garonne department
