= Montbarla =

- Commune
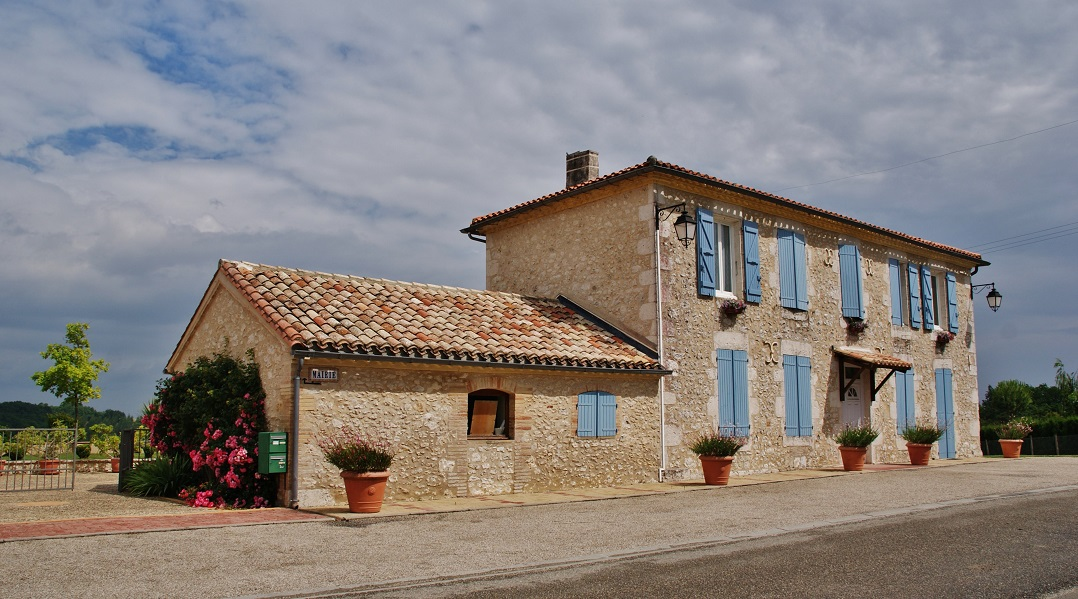
- Town hall
- Location of Montbarla
- Location within France Location within Occitanie
- Coordinates: 44°13′17″N 1°05′38″E
- Country: France
- Region: Occitania
- Department: Tarn-et-Garonne
- Arrondissement: Castelsarrasin
- Canton: Pays de Serres Sud-Quercy
- Intercommunality: Pays de Serres en Quercy

Government
  - Mayor (2020–2026): Jean-Paul Richard
- Area^{1}: 7.38 km^{2} (2.85 sq mi)
- Elevation: 201 m (659 ft)
- Highest elevation: 209 m (686 ft)
- Lowest elevation: 82 m (269 ft)
- Population (2023): 147
  - Density: 19.9/km^{2} (51.6/sq mi)
- Time zone: UTC+01:00 (CET)
  - Summer (DST): UTC+02:00 (CEST)
- INSEE/Postal code: 82122 /82110
- ^{1} French Land Register data, which excludes lakes, ponds, glaciers > 1 km^{2} (0.386 sq mi or 247 acres) and river estuaries.

Montbarla (French pronunciation: [mɔ̃baʁla]; Languedocien: Montvarlan) is a commune in the Tarn-et-Garonne department in the Occitanie region in southern France.

== Geography ==
The Petite Barguelonne forms all of the commune's north-western and western borders, then flows into the Barguelonne, which forms all of the commune's southern border.

== See also ==
- Communes of the Tarn-et-Garonne department
