= Lauzerte =

- Commune
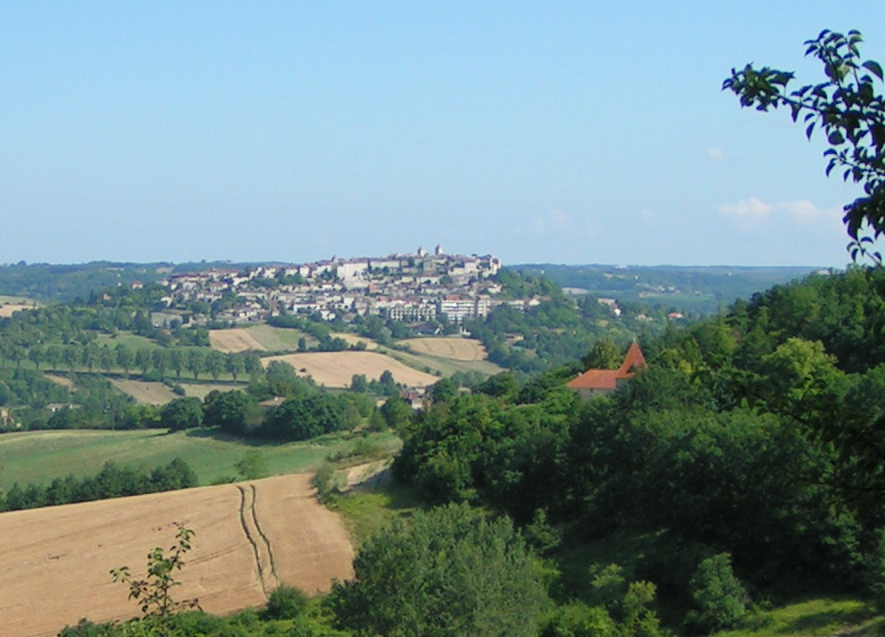
- A general view of Lauzerte

- Coat of arms
- Location of Lauzerte
- Location within France Location within Occitanie
- Coordinates: 44°15′24″N 1°08′18″E
- Country: France
- Region: Occitania
- Department: Tarn-et-Garonne
- Arrondissement: Castelsarrasin
- Canton: Pays de Serres Sud-Quercy

Government
  - Mayor (2020–2026): François-Thierry Le Moing
- Area^{1}: 44.56 km^{2} (17.20 sq mi)
- Elevation: 176 m (577 ft)
- Highest elevation: 270 m (890 ft)
- Lowest elevation: 98 m (322 ft)
- Population (2023): 1,443
  - Density: 32.38/km^{2} (83.87/sq mi)
- Time zone: UTC+01:00 (CET)
  - Summer (DST): UTC+02:00 (CEST)
- INSEE/Postal code: 82094 /82110
- ^{1} French Land Register data, which excludes lakes, ponds, glaciers > 1 km^{2} (0.386 sq mi or 247 acres) and river estuaries.

Lauzerte (French pronunciation: [lozɛʁt]; Languedocien: Lausèrta) is a commune in the Tarn-et-Garonne department in the Occitanie region in southern France. It is a member of Les Plus Beaux Villages de France (The Most Beautiful Villages of France) Association.

Etymology of the name: Two interpretations include the possible Latin root of "Villaserta" and more likely, the Gallic root, "lauzes", flat stones used as paving or roofing, and "erta" from the local Occitan dialect, meaning hill, thus Hill of Flat Stones. The fact that the barbican was exploited as a quarry supports this derivation.

A medieval bastide perched above the valleys and hills of the area known as the Quercy Blanc, Lauzerte is one of the Most Beautiful Villages of France, a distinction granted to only 155 villages in the country. Founded in the 12th century by the Count of Toulouse, the village is located on one of the routes of the Santiago de Compostela.

== Geography/Topography ==
In the northwest corner of the Tarn et Garonne department, Lauzerte lies between the foothills of the Massif Central and the Garonne river plain in the region known as the Quercy Blanc and Pays de Serres because of the limestone which predominates in the landscape. The hill town rises above parallel valleys and rivers, the Barguelonnes, the Lendou and the Seoune which feed into the Garonne River.

Lauzerte is surrounded by agricultural land known for Melons de Quercy, Chasselas de Moissac (white dessert grapes), and Pruneaux d'Agen (plums).

== History ==
BC: The discovery of copper coins from several years BC indicate that Lauzerte was an oppidum, part of Roman Gaul.

Eleventh century: the area belonged to the Lords of Castelnau Montratier.

At the end of the twelfth century, two local noblemen approached Raymond V, Count of Toulouse, to establish a castelnau, a plot of 200 houses, prefiguring the bastide movement which would later predominate in the region. The motivation to do so would have been the same, however, to establish a small community of rent-paying supporters. With its castle, enclosure, towers and six fortified gateways, the fortified town was the pride of the region. Henry IV, King of France, described it as "one of four keys of the said Quercy land." Despite this reputation, it was later occupied by the English in the Hundred Years' War and later suffered attack in the Wars of Religion.

Thirteenth century: Alphonse of Poitiers and his wife, Jeanne of Toulouse visited the hospice located here, founded in 1222 ( the oldest building in the village, it still serves 110 pensioners.) When Alphonse died, Lauzerte passed directly to the King of France. The English king contested the will, as The Treaty of Paris had granted Quercy to the King of England who garnered a rent of 3,000 pounds a year. The many weapons and bones in the charnel house indicate the extent of slaughter and resistance to the English.

During the Hundred Years' War, Lauzerte was occupied by the English. Despite foreign occupation, some Lauzertins charged interest in exchange for ransom fees to nobility captured by the English. From this same period, legend has it that an old lady named Gandilhonne noticed the English were leaving. Although illiterate, she counted the number departing by putting a chestnut in her pocket to count each individual. She reported the exodus to the town consuls, who closed the gates, thus preventing the English from reentering.

Fourteenth century: A Carmelite convent was established. "Pastoureux", the shepherds who preyed on pilgrims and other travellers, conducted a massacre of Jews.

Sixteenth century: Lauzerte passed first to Protestant control, after a battle resulting in 567 deaths, then back to Catholic control under the leadership of Terride.

Lauzerte continued to prosper for various reasons. It was the seat of a secondary seneschalsy (court of appeals) and administrative center for collecting taxes from the surrounding countryside. The region provided much of the wheat for Cahors. Pilgrims provided income to Lauzerte as well.

At the time of the Revolution, the town elected Gouges Cartou, a bourgeois, to represent the town at the new Estates General, the parliament.

At the beginning of the nineteenth century, Napoleon created the Departement of Tarn et Garonne. Lauzerte, which was until then part of the Lot, was attached to the new Departement.

The cellist and composer Louis-Charles-Joseph Rey (1738–1811) was born in Lauzerte as well as his elder brother Jean-Baptiste Rey (1734–1810), conductor and composer.

== Architecture ==
The mairie, the town hall, originally housed the Mirepoise Sisters, nuns who founded a school for daughters of the nobility in the eighteenth century. Next to this were housed the "Penitents Bleus", a Catholic brotherhood and mutual help society. The leather Christ on the Cross displayed in the Church would have been carried in processions by the brothers on Mardi Gras and Good Friday.

The senechaussee, the administrative center, constructed between 1360 and 1370 has beneath it a vaulted cellar, which includes a tunnel that reputedly leads to Beaucaire, a hamlet 3 kilometers away.

The large arched doorways in merchant homes acted as shop windows. Goods would have been displayed in the upper half, while doors across the lower half would serve as windbreak. The smaller arches beside them entered to the home above. Tiny windows on the next storey provided light to the store rooms. Above these, the pair of long windows serve on to the main living area, whilst the oculus at the top is at the attic level.

The half-timbered upstairs additions on some buildings extend out further over the street as a means to increase living area whilst only paying taxes on the area of the ground floor.

In addition to the other holy orders located in Lauzerte, the sisters of St. Clare established a school in 1623 on Rue de la Gendarmerie. Its door is in the shape of a basket handle, and the square tower to its right houses the chapel. The school attracted rich young women whose fathers encouraged them to take the veil as the dowry was less than the cost to marry them off. Records indicate widows and unhappy wives resided at the convent as well.

== Arts and Culture ==
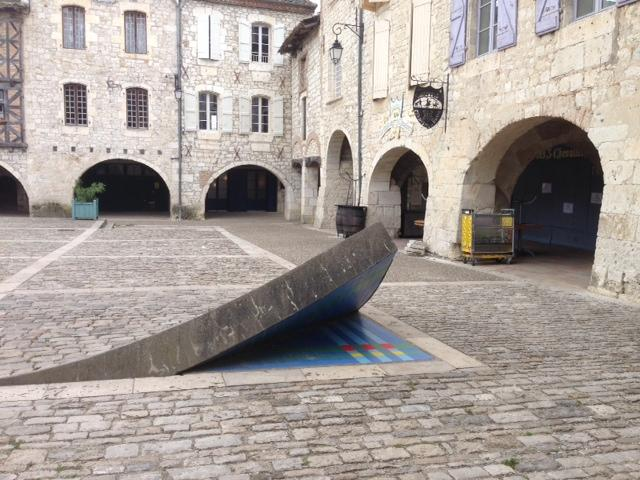
Paving of the Place des Cornières, 1988, Lauzerte, France

The main square, Place des Cornieres, features an uplifted corner of pavers, a unique and whimsical sculpture created in 1988 by local ceramic artist, Jacques Buchholtz whose work also appears in the Jardin de la Brèche.

The local market takes place in the square on Saturday mornings throughout the year.

Wrought iron signs hanging from the exterior of a number of buildings indicate the type of business located within.

Lauzerte has a lively artistic community with artists working in such mediums as illuminated manuscripts, artist books, pottery, and textiles.

Festivals in Lauzerte include the Place Aux Fleurs in late April, the Journées du Patrimoine et des Moulins in mid-June, the Marché aux Potiers in early July, les Marchés Gourmands every Thursday in July and August.

== See also ==
- Communes of the Tarn-et-Garonne department
