= Canton of Lavit =

Coordinates: 43°58′42″N 0°52′41″E

The canton of Lavit was one of the 12 cantons of the arrondissement of Castelsarrasin, in the Tarn-et-Garonne department in southern France. It had 3,056 inhabitants (2012). It was disbanded following the French canton reorganisation which came into effect in March 2015. It consisted of 14 communes, which joined the canton of Garonne-Lomagne-Brulhois in 2015.

The canton comprised the following communes:

- Asques
- Balignac
- Castéra-Bouzet
- Gensac
- Gramont
- Lachapelle
- Lavit
- Mansonville
- Marsac
- Maumusson
- Montgaillard
- Poupas
- Puygaillard-de-Lomagne
- Saint-Jean-du-Bouzet
