= Canton of Auvillar =

Coordinates: 44°03′50″N 0°52′33″E

Auvillar
- Former canton
- Interactive map of Auvillar
- Country: France
- Region: Occitania
- Department: Tarn-et-Garonne
- No. of communes: {{{nbcomm}}}
- Disbanded: 2015
- Population (2012): 4,896

The canton of Auvillar is a French former administrative division in the department of Tarn-et-Garonne and region Midi-Pyrénées. It had 4,896 inhabitants (2012). It was disbanded following the French canton reorganisation which came into effect in March 2015. It consisted of 10 communes, which joined the canton of Garonne-Lomagne-Brulhois in 2015.

The canton comprised the following communes:

- Auvillar
- Bardigues
- Donzac
- Dunes
- Merles
- Le Pin
- Saint-Cirice
- Saint-Loup
- Saint-Michel
- Sistels
