= Antoine de la Mothe Cadillac =

French explorer in North America (1658–1730)

Antoine de la Mothe, sieur de Cadillac
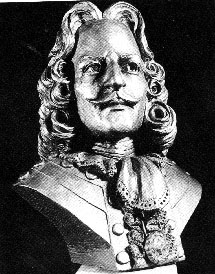
- 19th century bust of Cadillac

3rd French Colonial Governor of Louisiana
- In office 1713–1716
- Monarchs: Louis XIV; Louis XV
- Preceded by: Jean-Baptiste Le Moyne de Bienville
- Succeeded by: Jean-Baptiste Le Moyne de Bienville

Personal details
- Born: Antoine Laumet; March 5, 1658 Saint-Nicolas-de-la-Grave, Kingdom of France
- Died: October 16, 1730 (aged 72) Castelsarrasin, Kingdom of France
- Resting place: Church of the Carmelite Fathers of Castelsarrasin
- Spouse: Marie-Thérèse Guyon
- Occupation: Governor, explorer, adventurer
- Known for: Founder of Detroit

Military service
- Allegiance: Kingdom of France
- Branch/service: French Navy
- Years of service: 1675–1718
- Awards: Order of Saint Louis Chevalier

Antoine de la Mothe, sieur de Cadillac (/ˈkædɪlæk/, French: [kadijak]; March 5, 1658 – October 16, 1730), born Antoine Laumet, was a French explorer, military officer, colonial administrator in New France, and founder of Detroit, Michigan.

Born in Gascony, Cadillac arrived in Acadia in 1683 at age 25. He was the commander of Fort de Buade in St. Ignace and founded Fort Pontchartrain du Détroit in 1701. Cadillac envisioned Detroit as a major settlement in the Pays d'en Haut, which he referred to as the "Paris de la Nouvelle-France" (Paris of New France), and he planned its early development. In 1710, Cadillac was appointed colonial governor of French Louisiana. King Louis XIV awarded him the Order of Saint Louis.

Cadillac's bold personality and to a lesser extent his Franciscan affiliation earned him many enemies, including the Jesuits in Quebec, who accused him of various crimes. This led to his detention in 1704, although he cleared his name the following year. In 1717, Cadillac was removed from his colonial office and was briefly imprisoned twice during a power struggle with financier Antoine Crozat. Later, Cadillac held the mayoral office of Castelsarrasin, where he died in 1730.

In contrast to many French aristocrats and officials of his time, Cadillac, despite holding various high-ranking positions both in the colonies and in France, has no surviving authentic portrait. The images that do exist are primarily artistic sketches created long after his death. Historians suggest that the absence of an authenticated portrait of Cadillac is likely a damnatio memoriae instigated by his numerous enemies. Nevertheless, Cadillac's name is commemorated by an automobile company established in 1902 by William Murphy and Henry M. Leland. Western culture has historically idealized him as a hero, with numerous places named after him. However, contemporary liberal scholars often critique his colonial activities.

== Early life ==
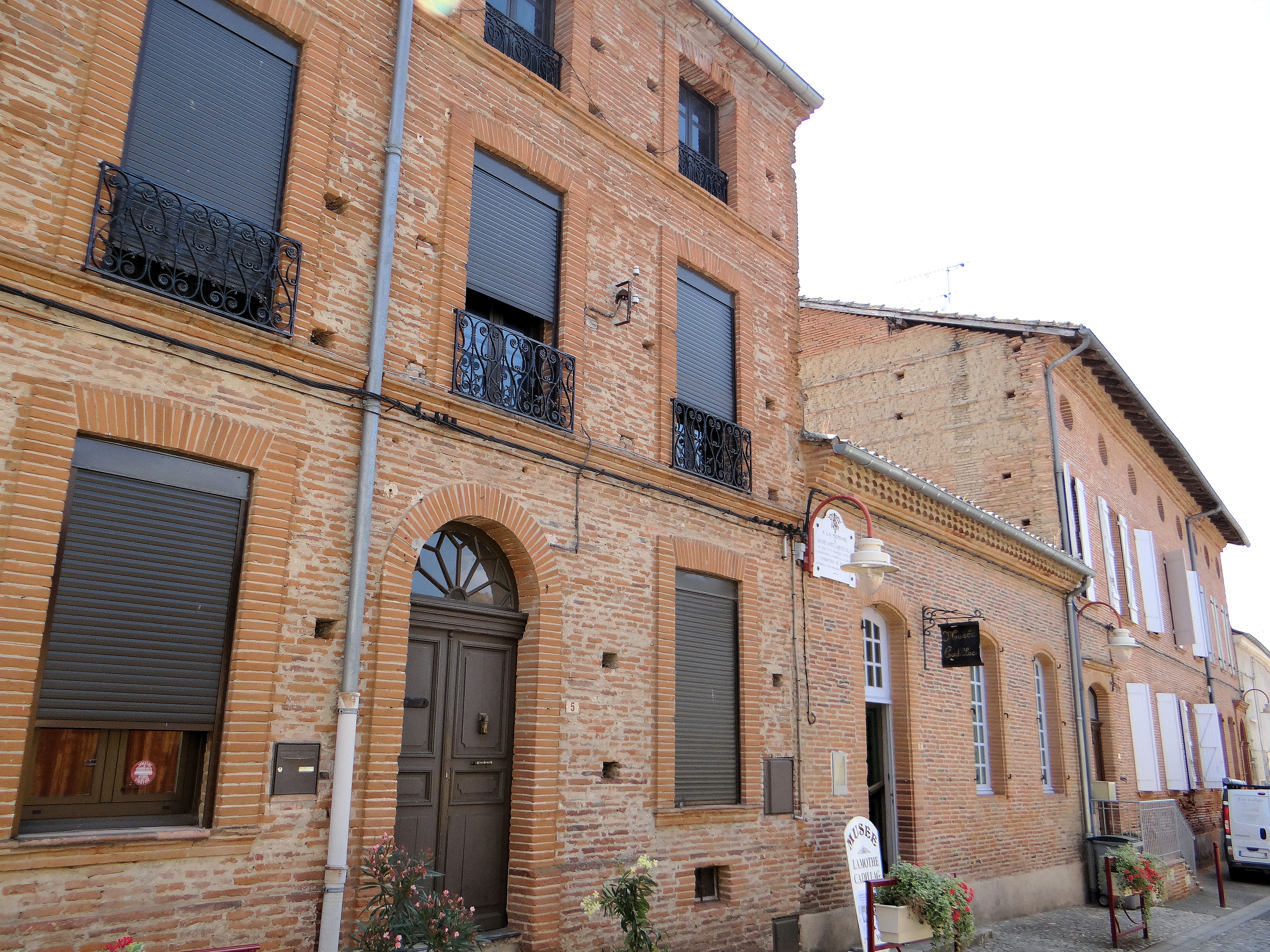
Musée Cadillac, the birthplace of Antoine de la Mothe Cadillac

Cadillac was born Antoine Laumet on March 5, 1658, in Saint-Nicolas-de-la-Grave in the province of Gascony (today in the Tarn-et-Garonne, Occitanie). His father, Jean Laumet, was born in Caumont-sur-Garonne. He became a lawyer in the Parlement of Toulouse. In 1652 Jean was appointed lieutenant to the judge of Saint-Nicolas-de-la-Grave by Cardinal Mazarin and appointed as a judge in 1664. Antoine's mother, Jeanne Péchagut, was the daughter of a merchant and landowner. His youth included rigorous study at a Jesuit institution where he learned theology, law, agriculture, botany and zoology.

In a record of service he filled out in 1675, he said that he had enlisted in the military as a cadet at age 17 in the Dampierre regiment, in Charleroi, nowadays Belgium. Two years later in personal letters, however, he reported that he had been an officer in the Clérambault regiment in Thionville, and in 1682 he had joined the Albret regiment, in Thionville.

At age 25, he fled from France for North America. His father lost a lawsuit against a lawyer in Castelsarrasin that caused him financial difficulties. In addition, he had lost financial support following the death of Cardinal Mazarin and suffered intolerance from Protestants. Laumet may have immigrated illegally, as historians have not found his name on any passenger list of ships departing from a French port.

== New France ==
In 1683, Antoine Laumet arrived at Port Royal, the capital of Acadia. During the next four years, he wandered from New England to New Holland, and south to the Province of Carolina, while learning some Native American languages and habits. He probably entered into a business relationship with Denis Guyon, a merchant of Quebec. On June 25, 1687, at age 29, he married Guyon's daughter Marie-Thérèse in Quebec. The marriage certificate is the first document that records his new identity. He identified as "Antoine de Lamothe, écuyer, sieur de Cadillac", and signed as "De Lamothe Launay". Like many immigrants, he took advantage of emigrating to the New World to create a new identity, perhaps to conceal the reasons that drove him from France. This new identity "ne sort pas de son sac" ("I did not create this identity out of nowhere"), as he wrote later. Antoine Laumet based his new titles on those Sylvestre d'Esparbes de Lussan de Gout, baron of Lamothe-Bardigues, lord of Cadillac, Launay and Le Moutet; adviser to the Parliament of Toulouse. He knew him for at least two reasons: Bardigues, Cadillac, Launay and Le Moutet are villages and localities close to his birthplace, Saint-Nicolas-de-la-Grave, and Antoine's father Jean Laumet was a lawyer in the Parliament of Toulouse.

Coat of arms of Antoine de la Mothe Cadillac

The sons likely encountered each other during their studies. Second son in his family, Laumet identified with the second son of the baron. He used the phonic similarity between his own name and that of Launay, creating the name: Antoine de Lamothe-Launay. He took the title of écuyer (squire), the rank held by a family's second son, followed by the title sieur (sire) of Cadillac. This accorded with the Gascon custom whereby the junior family member succeeds the elder son upon the latter's death. Laumet created a new name, identity and noble origin, while protecting himself from possible recognition by persons who knew him in France. In addition, he presented his own titles of nobility, as illustrated by armorial bearings that he appropriated, in a lightly altered form, from Sylvestre d'Esparbes de Lussan, which would later become known as the logo of Cadillac.

They had six daughters and seven sons: Judith (1689), Magdeleine (1690), Marie Anne (1701), ? (1702), Marie-Thérèse (1704), Marie-Agathe (December 1707) and Joseph (1690), Antoine (1692), Jacques (1695), Pierre-Denis (1699–1700), Jean-Antoine (January 1707–1709), François (1709), René-Louis (1710–1714).

=== Les Douacques ===
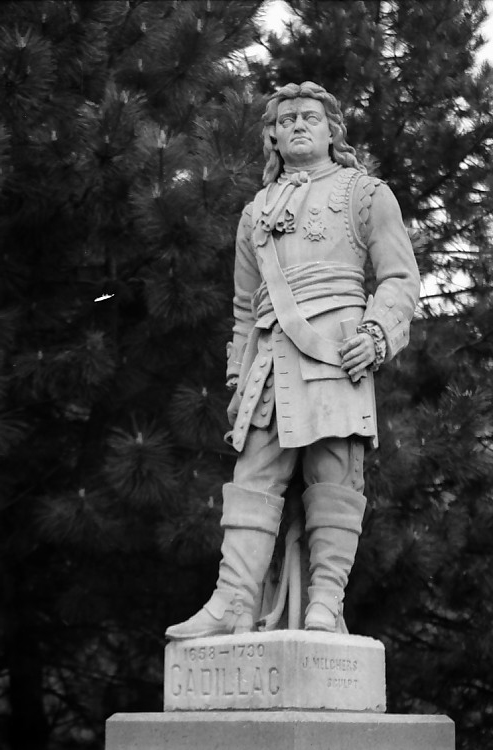
A sandstone statue of Cadillac from the old Detroit City Hall Building

In 1688, the Governor General of New France Jacques-René de Brisay de Denonville gave him the concession of the seigniory (estate) of Les Douacques (which later became Bar Harbor, Maine). His concession brought him no income, even from agriculture. Cadillac entered into a trading partnership with officers of Port Royal, an activity facilitated by using a ship owned by his brothers-in-law Guyon. In 1689, he was sent on an expedition in the vicinity of Boston. Upon his return, he asked the governor of Acadia, Louis-Alexandre des Friches de Méneval, for a job as notary, to bring in a minimum income; his request was turned down. Then, Cadillac was introduced to Governor Louis de Buade de Frontenac in Quebec, who sent him on an exploratory mission along the coasts of New England, aboard the frigate L'Embuscade (The Ambush). Strong head winds forced the ship to return to France.

In 1690, Cadillac was in Paris. He became part of the circle of the Secretary of State for the Navy, the marquis de Seignelay, then of his successor Louis Phélypeaux, comte de Pontchartrain, who appointed him officer of marine troops. On his return to Port Royal, Cadillac learned that the English admiral William Phips had seized the city and that his wife, daughter, and son were being held captives. They were released in exchange for some English prisoners. In 1691, Cadillac repatriated his family to Quebec, but their ship was attacked by a privateer out of Boston, who took possession of all their goods.

Cadillac was promoted to lieutenant in 1692. He was sent with cartographer Jean-Baptiste-Louis Franquelin to draw charts of the New England coastline in preparation for a French attack on the English colonies. He set out again for France to hand over the charts, together with a report, to Pontchartrain. In 1693, he received an allowance of 1,500 pounds for his work and was sent back on a further mission to supplement his observations. Frontenac promoted him to captain then to lieutenant commander in 1694.

=== Michilimackinac (1694–1696) ===
Cadillac was appointed commander of all the stations of the Pays d'En-Haut (the upper countries). He left France at the peak of his career to take up his command of Fort de Buade or Michilimackinac, which controlled all fur trading between Missouri, Mississippi, the Great Lakes, and the Ohio valley.

In 1695, Cadillac traveled to explore the area of the Great Lakes and to draw up charts. He had the idea of constructing a fort in the straits between Lakes Erie and Huron to compete with the English. In Michilimackinac, he came into conflict with the Jesuit fathers, such as Étienne de Carheil, who accused him of supplying alcohol to the Native Americans. This was prohibited by a royal decree.

In 1696, to mitigate the difficulties of fur trading, the king ordered the closing of all trading posts, including Michilimackinac. Cadillac returned to Montreal. In 1697, he was authorized to return to France to present his project of a new fort on the strait to Pontchartrain; Frontenac requested that Cadillac be promoted to lieutenant commander. However, Canadian notables strongly opposed the project, which they believed would lead to the ruin of Quebec and Montreal. In 1700 installation of the fort was approved, and its command was given to Cadillac.

=== Le Détroit (1701–1710) ===
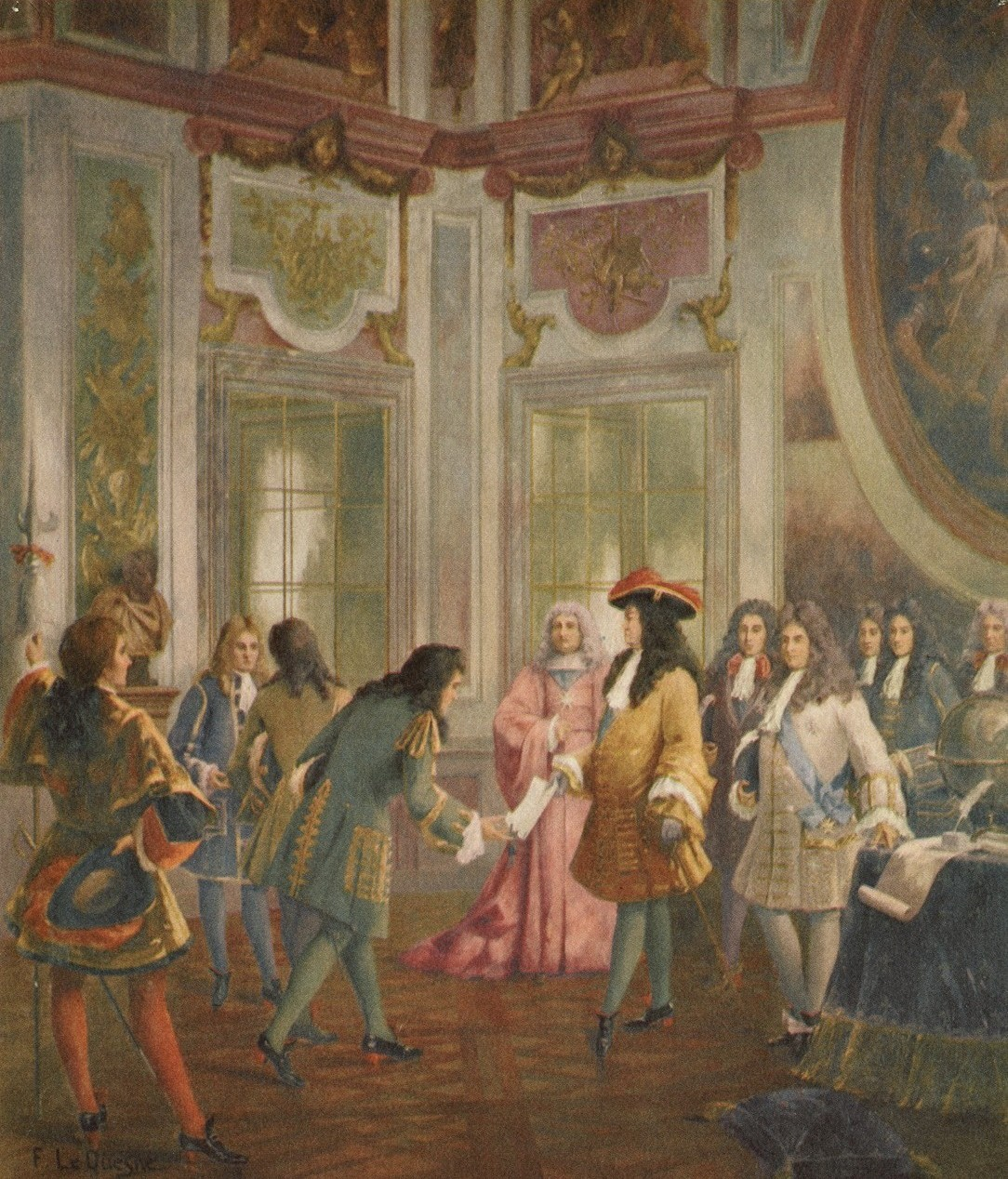
Painting depicting Cadillac receiving letters patent from representatives of King Louis XIV of France by Fernand Le Quesne.

On July 24, 1701, Cadillac, as Commandant of the Troupes de la Marine expedition, led the group that founded Fort Pontchartrain du Détroit and the parish of Sainte-Anne on the straits ("le détroit" in French). Alphonse de Tonti served as Captain and second in command. In 1702, Cadillac returned to Quebec to request the monopoly of all fur-trading activities and the transfer to his authority of the Native American tribes in the area of the straits. He became a shareholder in the "Company of the Colony." After return to the straits, he helped in welcoming and settling the native tribes formerly installed at Michillimakinac.

A fire devastated Fort Pontchartrain in 1703, destroying all the registers and records. Cadillac was recalled to Quebec in 1704 to face charges of trafficking in alcohol and furs. Although he was imprisoned as a preventive measure for a few months, his name was cleared in 1705. The king guaranteed him all his titles and granted him the fur-trading monopoly he sought. Two years later, Cadillac was charged with multiple counts of abuse of authority; Pontchartrain appointed a representative, Daigremont, to investigate, who formulated an indictment against Cadillac in 1708.

In 1709, the troops stationed on the straits were given the order to return to Montreal. In 1710, the king named Cadillac governor of La Louisiane, the expansive Louisiana (New France) territory, and ordered him to take up his duties immediately, traveling via the Mississippi River. Cadillac did not obey. He drew up a general inventory of the straits and then in 1711 boarded a ship with his family, bound for France. In 1712 in Paris, he convinced the Toulouse-born financier Antoine Crozat to invest in Louisiana.

=== Louisiana (1710–1716) ===
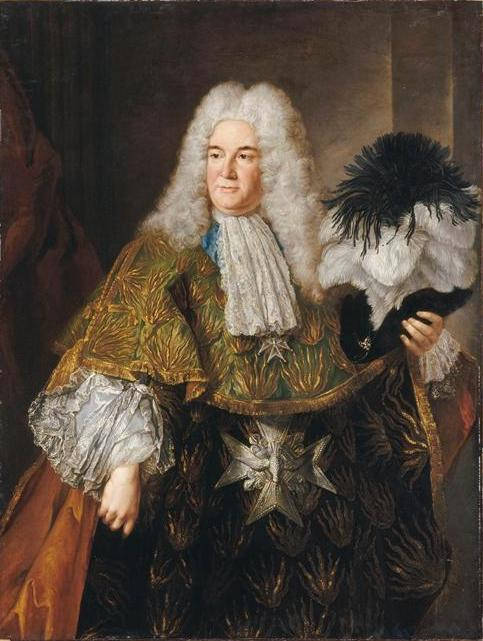
Antoine Crozat, a French financier, was persuaded by Cadillac to invest in Louisiana. However, conflicts arose between them, leading to Cadillac's removal from his colonial office in 1716.

In June 1713, the Cadillac family arrived at Fort Louis, Louisiana (now Mobile, Alabama). In 1714 Crozat recommended the construction of forts along the Mississippi River, whereas Cadillac wished to strengthen defenses at the river delta and to develop trade with nearby Spanish colonies. However, the neglect of diplomatic etiquette of the Calumet ceremony with the Natchez chief caused relations to decline and perhaps contributed to the commercial failure of the French there.

In 1715, Cadillac and his son Joseph prospected in the Illinois Country (Upper Louisiana), where they claimed to have discovered a copper mine, although there is no copper ore in that area. They established a farm and founded the settlement of St. Philippe on the east side of the Mississippi River. Cadillac directed the first mining of lead in present-day Missouri at what is now called Mine La Motte on the west side of the river. The French brought in slaves to work at the mine; they were the first people of African descent in the future state of Missouri. The production of lead was important for ammunition in the colonies. The Southeast Missouri Lead District is still a major source of that metal. After many arguments, Crozat withdrew any authority Cadillac had in the company. The following year, he ordered Cadillac removed from colonial office.

== Castelsarrasin (1717–1730) ==
In 1717 Cadillac returned to France and settled in La Rochelle. Cadillac went to Paris with his son Joseph. They were arrested immediately and imprisoned in the Bastille for five months. They were released in 1718, and Cadillac was decorated with the Order of Saint Louis to reward his 30 years of loyal services. He settled in the paternal home, where he dealt with his parents' estate.

He made many trips to Paris to have his rights to the concession on the straits recognized. He was finally vindicated in 1722. He sold his estate on the straits to Jacques Baudry de Lamarche, a Canadian. The French government appointed Cadillac as governor and mayor of Castelsarrasin, close to his birthplace.

Cadillac died on October 16, 1730, in Castelsarrasin (Occitanie). He was buried in a vault of the Carmelite Fathers' church.

== Legacy ==
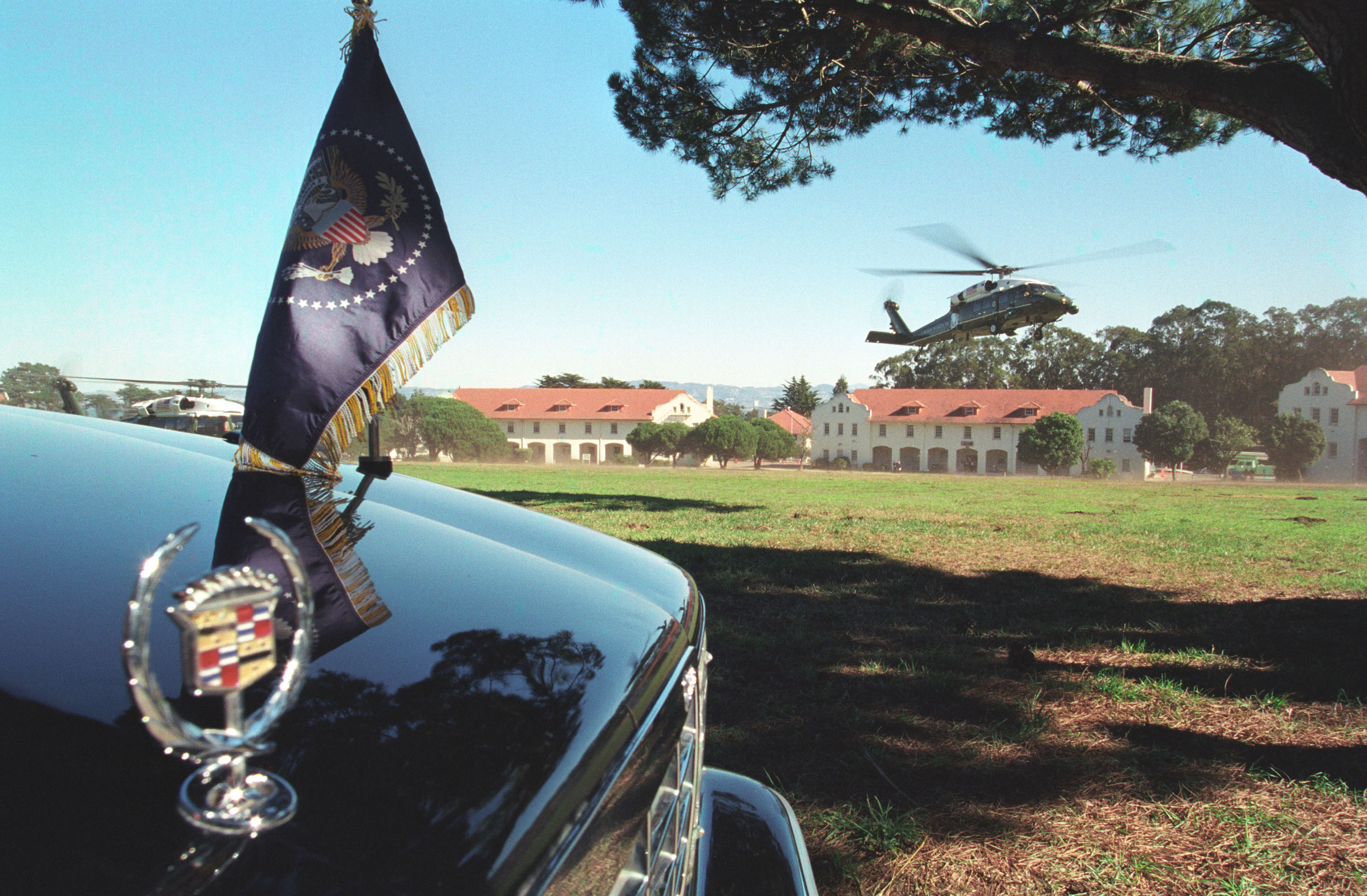
Cadillac motor car logo, c. 1950s, being the coat of arms of Antoine de la Mothe Cadillac

Some of Cadillac's expansive visions were conceived long after his passing. He had once promised that Fort Pontchartrain du Détroit would be built into what he described as "Paris de la Nouvelle-France." This settlement eventually transformed into Detroit. Additionally, Cadillac imagined a port to be established near the mouth of the Mississippi River, which was later founded by Jean-Baptiste Le Moyne de Bienville in 1718 as New Orleans.

Cadillac was honored with a 3-cent stamp on July 24, 1951, to commemorate the 250th anniversary of his landing at Detroit in 1701. The stamp's background design depicts Detroit's skyline as it appeared in 1951 and the foreground shows Cadillac's landing at Detroit in 1701. A museum in his birthplace opened in 1974, conceived of and funded by historians in Detroit.

A street in the Guybourg area in Longue-Pointe (now Mercier) on the island of Montreal was named in honour of Cadillac. In 1976, Cadillac station on the green line of the Montreal Metro opened at this street.

In 1703, Cadillac proposed the establishment of a seminary in the parish of Sainte-Anne-de-Détroit in Detroit, aimed at educating both Indigenous and French children in piety and the French language. He pledged his future support for this seminary, which foreshadowed the founding of the Catholepistemiad, known today as the University of Michigan. In 2016, the public French high school in Windsor, Ontario, was renamed in Cadillac's honour.

== See also ==
- Jacques Marquette
- Jean-Baptiste Bissot, Sieur de Vincennes
- Jean Baptiste Point du Sable

== Notes ==
Government offices
Preceded by Jean-Baptiste Le Moyne de Bienville	French Governor of Louisiana; 1713–1716	Succeeded by Jean-Baptiste Le Moyne de Bienville
