= Musée Cadillac =

Cadillac Museum
- musée Cadillac (French)
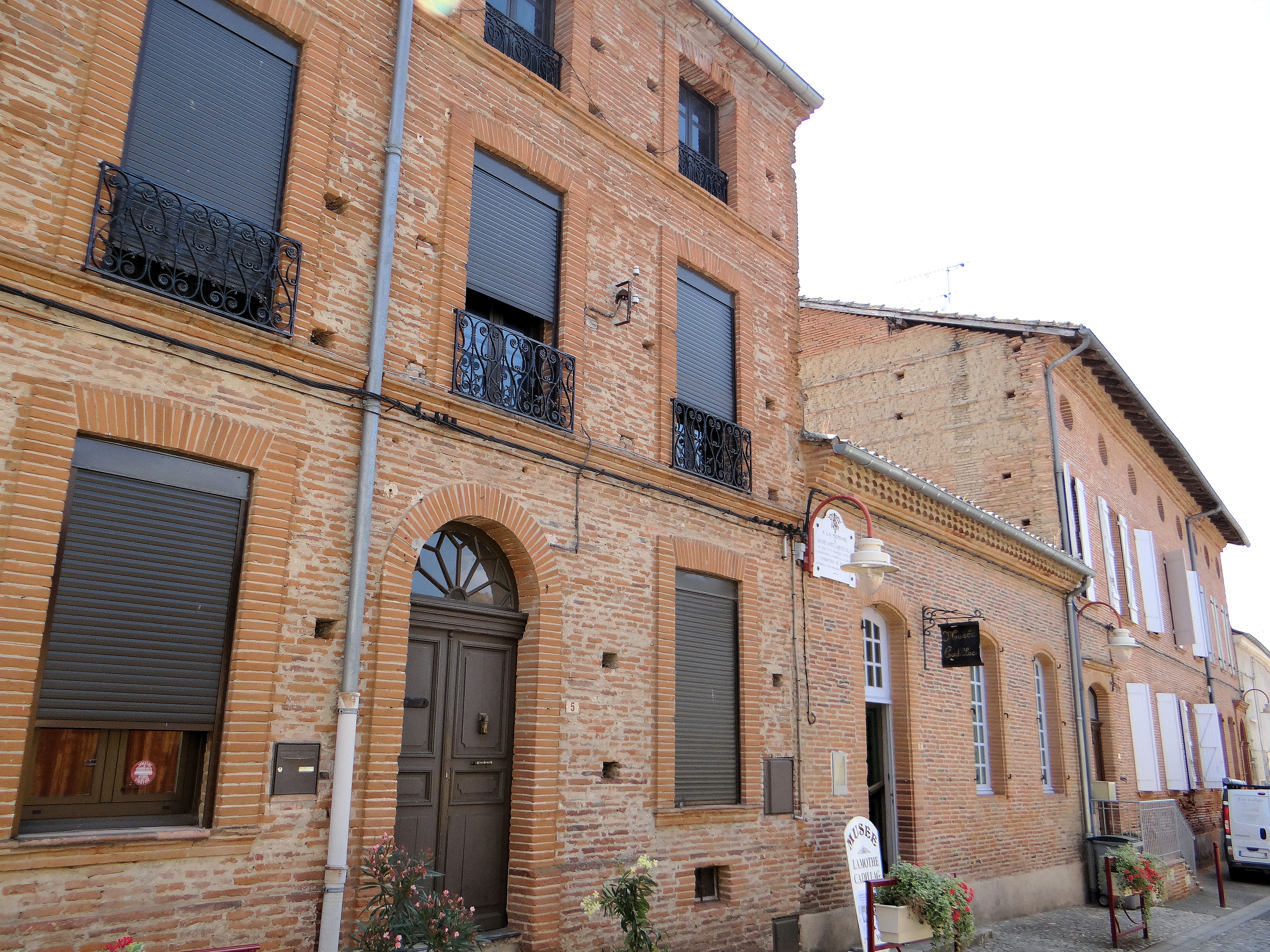
- Interactive map of Cadillac Museum
- Location: Saint-Nicolas-de-la-Grave; Tarn-et-Garonne, France

Monument historique
- Official name: Maison natale du Chevalier de Lamothe-Cadillac
- Designated: 18 July 1973
- Reference no.: PA00095884

Michigan State Historic Site
- Designated: 1984
- Reference no.: S564C

The Musée Cadillac is the birthplace of French explorer Antoine de la Mothe Cadillac, the founder of the city of Detroit, and a museum dedicated to his life. Located in Saint-Nicolas-de-la-Grave, Tarn-et-Garonne, France, the museum opened in 1974, following interest from Detroit historians into the founder of their city.

The museum is inscribed as a Monument historique by the French Ministry of Culture, and is also listed as a Michigan State Historic Site by the Michigan State Historic Preservation Office. Its designation as a Michigan historic site is one of only 8 designated sites located outside the state of Michigan, and the only one located outside the United States.

== Background ==
Antoine Laumet was likely born in this house on 5 March 1658. He fled France for North America at the age of 25, arriving in Port-Royal in 1683. Upon his arrival in America, La Mothe adopted his title after the town of Cadillac in southwestern France. He rose from a modest beginning in Acadia as an explorer, trapper, and a trader of alcohol and furs, achieving various positions of political importance in New France. He was the commander of Fort de Buade in St. Ignace, Michigan, in 1694, and founded Fort Pontchartrain du Détroit in 1701.

His knowledge of the coasts of New England and the Great Lakes area was appreciated by Frontenac, governor of New France, and Pontchartrain, Secretary of State for the Navy. This earned him various favors, including the Order of Saint Louis from King Louis XIV. The Jesuits in Canada, however, accused him of perverting the Native Americans with his alcohol trading, and he was imprisoned for a few months in Quebec in 1704, and again in the Bastille on his return to France in 1717.

The city of Detroit became the world center of automobile production in the 20th century. William H. Murphy and Henry M. Leland founded the Cadillac auto company in 1902, and paid homage to him by using his name for their company and his self-created armorial bearings as its logo. Various places bear his name in America, in particular Cadillac Mountain in Maine and the town of Cadillac, Michigan.

Opinions of Antoine de la Mothe Cadillac's reputation vary, stemming from his status as the founder of a major American city, and his general dishonesty. For example, the Dictionary of Canadian Biography cites Agnes C. Laut and William J. Eccles on the issue, who opined respectively that Cadillac was one of the "great early heroes in North American history," or "one of the worst scoundrels ever to set foot in New France."

== Museum history ==
Detroit historians became interested in memorializing Antoine de la Mothe Cadillac in the 1970s, after research indicated that the house in Saint-Nicolas-de-la-Grave was the location of his birth. Leonard Simons, advertising executive and head of the Detroit Historical Society, led the effort to purchase and restore the house, which was in disrepair, and had recently been occupied by a "junk shop." General Motors, owners of the Cadillac automobile brand, was invited to donate funds for the restoration in 1971, but refused, and private donors funded the restoration work.

The house was purchased and restored at a cost of US$20,000, equivalent to $113,000 in 2024. Restoration work was carried out under the supervision of French historical authorities, and restored the appearance of the house in the 18th century. The house itself was built in the 17th century, and previously bore a plaque installed in 1903 commemorating Cadillac's achievements.

The house was inscribed as a Monument historique in July 1973, and the Michigan State Historic Preservation Office installed a commemorative plaque in October 1984. The Michigan historical marker at the museum is one of eight outside the state, and the only one outside the United States.

== Collection ==
Detroit historians made copies of a comprehensive collection of original documents about Cadillac, which were presented to the museum at its dedication.
