= Castelmayran =

- Commune
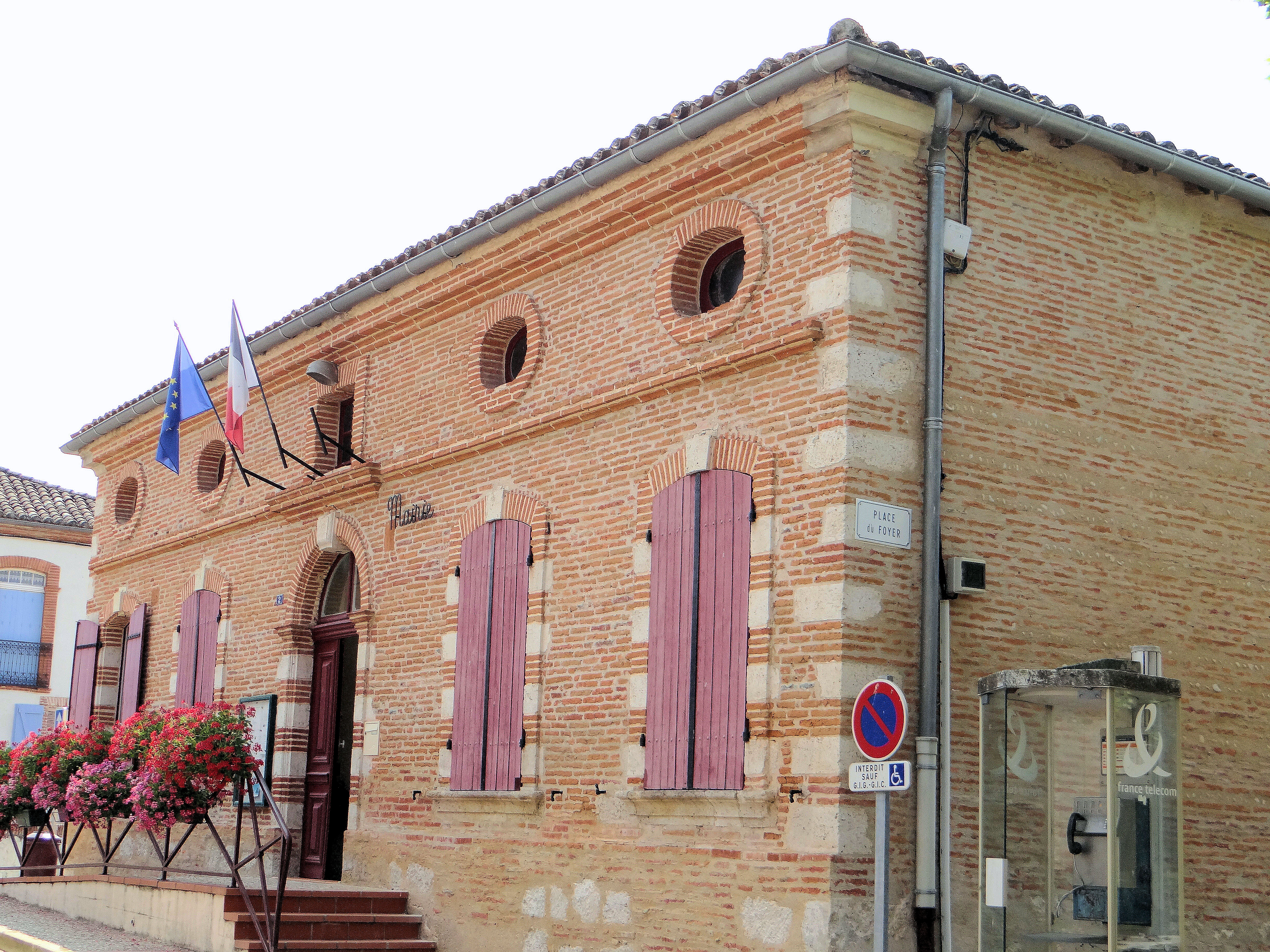
- The town hall of Castelmayran
- Location of Castelmayran
- Location within France Location within Occitanie
- Coordinates: 44°01′47″N 1°02′23″E
- Country: France
- Region: Occitania
- Department: Tarn-et-Garonne
- Arrondissement: Castelsarrasin
- Canton: Garonne-Lomagne-Brulhois
- Intercommunality: Terres des Confluences

Government
  - Mayor (2020–2026): Thierry Jamain
- Area^{1}: 15.96 km^{2} (6.16 sq mi)
- Elevation: 90 m (300 ft)
- Highest elevation: 140 m (460 ft)
- Lowest elevation: 65 m (213 ft)
- Population (2023): 1,186
  - Density: 74.31/km^{2} (192.5/sq mi)
- Time zone: UTC+01:00 (CET)
  - Summer (DST): UTC+02:00 (CEST)
- INSEE/Postal code: 82031 /82210
- ^{1} French Land Register data, which excludes lakes, ponds, glaciers > 1 km^{2} (0.386 sq mi or 247 acres) and river estuaries.

Castelmayran (French pronunciation: [kastɛlmɛʁɑ̃]; Occitan: Castèlmairan) is a commune in the Tarn-et-Garonne department in the Occitanie region in southern France.

== Name ==
According to Ernest Nègre, Castelmayran comes from the Occitan castèl (from the Latin castellum) and a Latin personal name, Marianus.

== History ==
=== Lordship of Castelmayran ===
In the 12th century, the lordship belonged to a branch of the family of Argombat which founded the Cistercian abbey of Belleperche. And by 1143 the final transfer of the abbey was discussed at a meeting held in Castelmayran.

Castelmayran had several co-seigneurs over time (Note: coseigneur: a seigneur who held the lordship in common with another.), among whose Nicolas de Gourgues, the last one before the French Revolution.

=== Lectoure and Lomagne ===
Before 1789, Castelmayran was a city of Gascony, in the diocese of Lectoure, and election of Lomagne.

== Administration ==
The mayor of Castelmayran is Thierry Jamain, re-elected in 2020.

== See also ==
- Communes of the Tarn-et-Garonne department
