= Saint-Aignan, Tarn-et-Garonne =

Saint-Aignan
- Commune
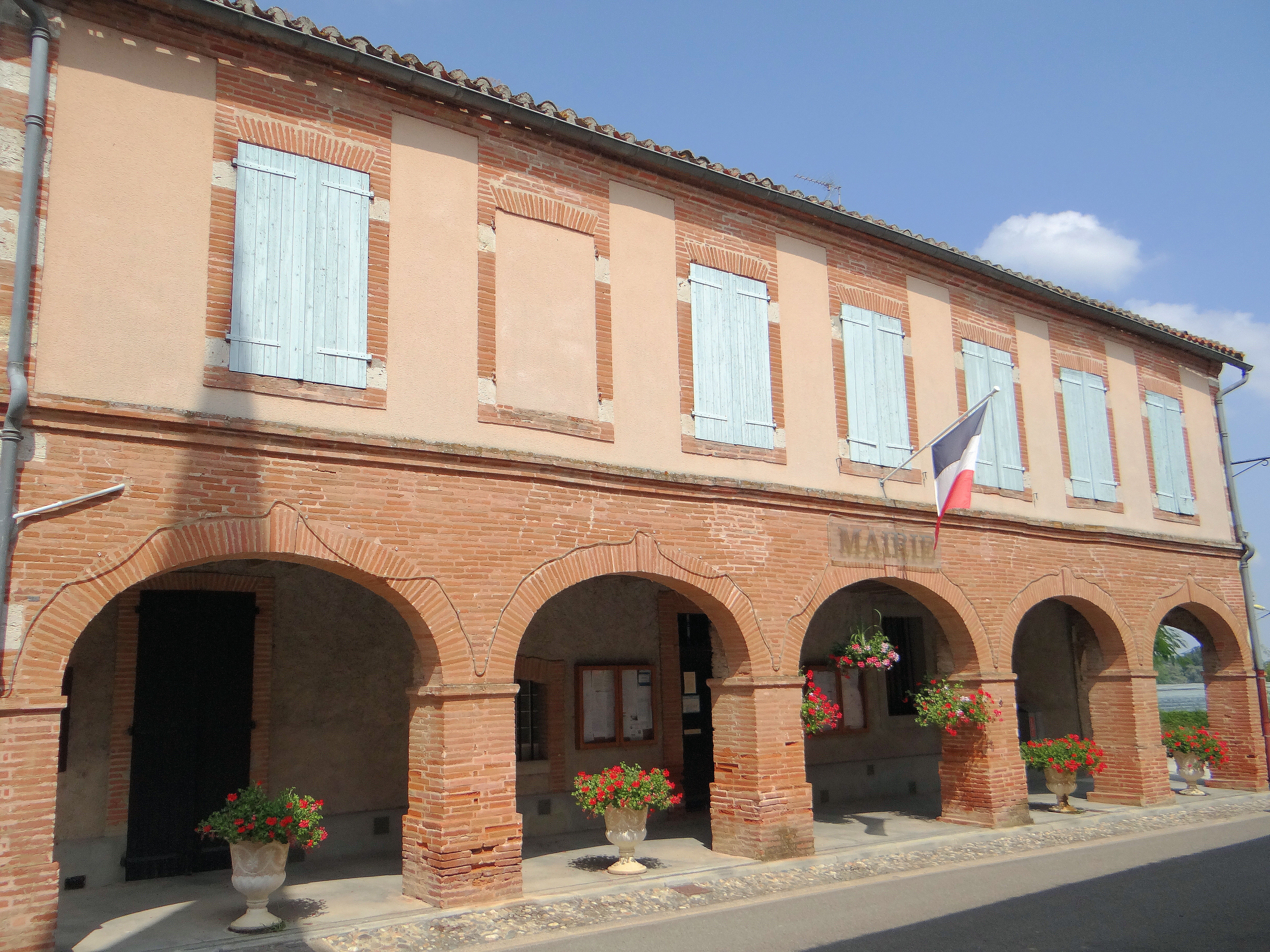
- The town hall of Saint-Aignan
- Location of Saint-Aignan
- Location within France Location within Occitanie
- Coordinates: 44°01′08″N 1°04′30″E
- Country: France
- Region: Occitania
- Department: Tarn-et-Garonne
- Arrondissement: Castelsarrasin
- Canton: Garonne-Lomagne-Brulhois

Government
  - Mayor (2020–2026): Philippe Fournie
- Area^{1}: 4.85 km^{2} (1.87 sq mi)
- Elevation: 79 m (259 ft)
- Highest elevation: 138 m (453 ft)
- Lowest elevation: 67 m (220 ft)
- Population (2023): 422
  - Density: 87.0/km^{2} (225/sq mi)
- Time zone: UTC+01:00 (CET)
  - Summer (DST): UTC+02:00 (CEST)
- INSEE/Postal code: 82152 /82100
- ^{1} French Land Register data, which excludes lakes, ponds, glaciers > 1 km^{2} (0.386 sq mi or 247 acres) and river estuaries.

Saint-Agnan (French pronunciation: [sɛ̃.t‿ɛɲɑ̃]; Languedocien: Sent Anhan) is a commune in the Tarn-et-Garonne department in the Occitanie region in southern France.

== See also ==
- Communes of the Tarn-et-Garonne department
