= Caumont, Tarn-et-Garonne =

Caumont
- Commune
- Location of Caumont
- Location within France Location within Occitanie
- Coordinates: 44°01′12″N 1°00′07″E
- Country: France
- Region: Occitania
- Department: Tarn-et-Garonne
- Arrondissement: Castelsarrasin
- Canton: Garonne-Lomagne-Brulhois

Government
  - Mayor (2020–2026): Monique Delzers
- Area^{1}: 15.22 km^{2} (5.88 sq mi)
- Elevation: 157 m (515 ft)
- Highest elevation: 164 m (538 ft)
- Lowest elevation: 77 m (253 ft)
- Population (2023): 346
  - Density: 22.7/km^{2} (58.9/sq mi)
- Time zone: UTC+01:00 (CET)
  - Summer (DST): UTC+02:00 (CEST)
- INSEE/Postal code: 82035 /82210
- ^{1} French Land Register data, which excludes lakes, ponds, glaciers > 1 km^{2} (0.386 sq mi or 247 acres) and river estuaries.

Caumont (French pronunciation: [komɔ̃]) is a commune in the Tarn-et-Garonne department in the Occitanie region in southern France.

== See also ==
- Communes of the Tarn-et-Garonne department
