= Gensac, Tarn-et-Garonne =

Gensac
- Commune
- Location of Gensac
- Location within France Location within Occitanie
- Coordinates: 43°57′13″N 0°57′22″E
- Country: France
- Region: Occitania
- Department: Tarn-et-Garonne
- Arrondissement: Castelsarrasin
- Canton: Garonne-Lomagne-Brulhois
- Intercommunality: Lomagne Tarn-et-Garonnaise

Government
  - Mayor (2020–2026): Salvador Lopez
- Area^{1}: 11.59 km^{2} (4.47 sq mi)
- Elevation: 220 m (720 ft)
- Highest elevation: 230 m (750 ft)
- Lowest elevation: 15 m (49 ft)
- Population (2023): 102
  - Density: 8.80/km^{2} (22.8/sq mi)
- Time zone: UTC+01:00 (CET)
  - Summer (DST): UTC+02:00 (CEST)
- INSEE/Postal code: 82067 /82120
- ^{1} French Land Register data, which excludes lakes, ponds, glaciers > 1 km^{2} (0.386 sq mi or 247 acres) and river estuaries.

Gensac is a commune in the Tarn-et-Garonne department in the Occitanie region in southern France.

== See also ==
- Communes of the Tarn-et-Garonne department
