= Castéra-Bouzet =

- Commune
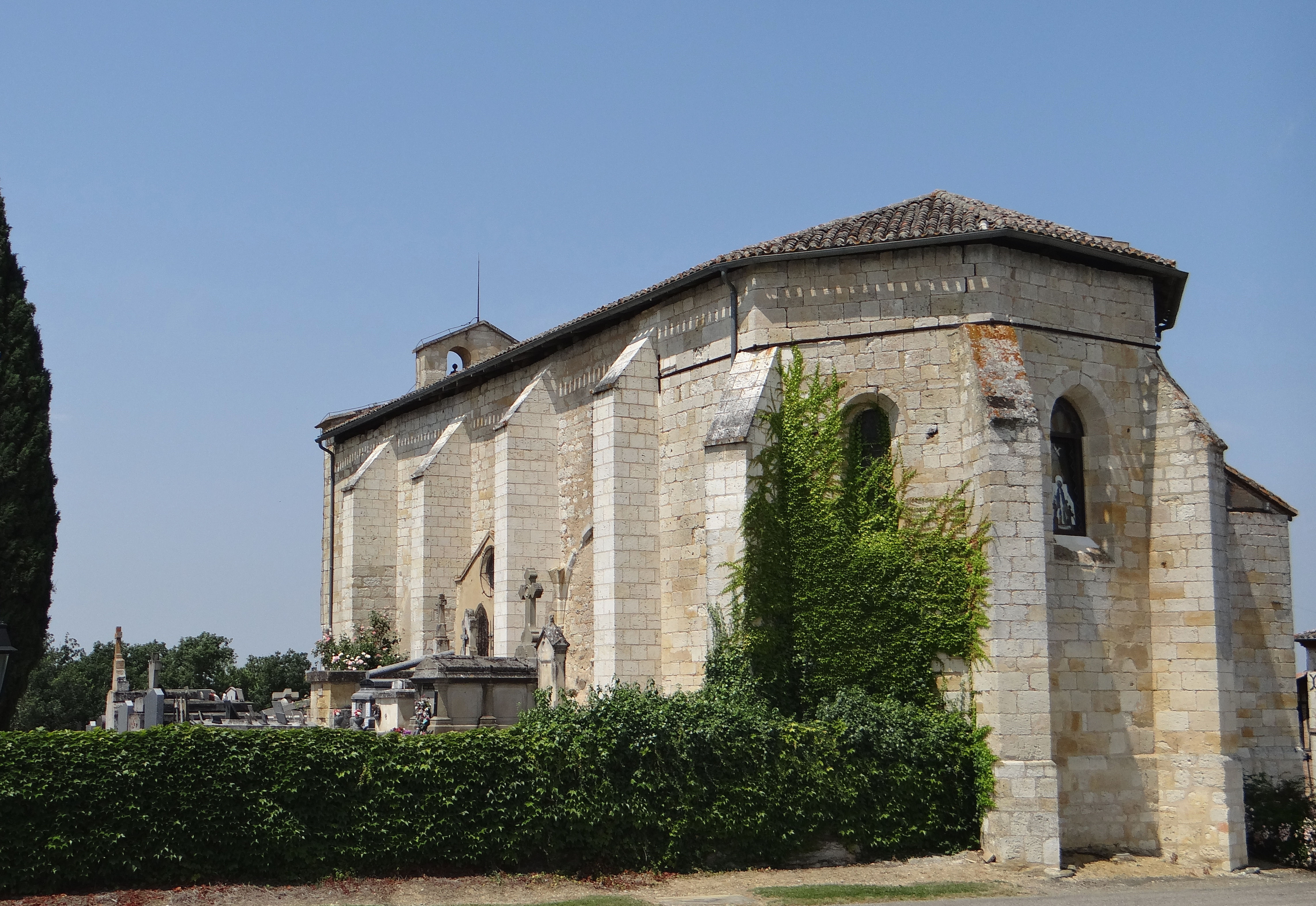
- The church of Saint-Barthélemy, in Castéra-Bouzet
- Location of Castéra-Bouzet
- Location within France Location within Occitanie
- Coordinates: 44°00′05″N 0°55′12″E
- Country: France
- Region: Occitania
- Department: Tarn-et-Garonne
- Arrondissement: Castelsarrasin
- Canton: Garonne-Lomagne-Brulhois
- Intercommunality: Lomagne Tarn-et-Garonnaise

Government
  - Mayor (2020–2026): Jean-Luc Colonna
- Area^{1}: 17.75 km^{2} (6.85 sq mi)
- Elevation: 217 m (712 ft)
- Highest elevation: 215 m (705 ft)
- Lowest elevation: 95 m (312 ft)
- Population (2023): 129
  - Density: 7.27/km^{2} (18.8/sq mi)
- Time zone: UTC+01:00 (CET)
  - Summer (DST): UTC+02:00 (CEST)
- INSEE/Postal code: 82034 /82120
- ^{1} French Land Register data, which excludes lakes, ponds, glaciers > 1 km^{2} (0.386 sq mi or 247 acres) and river estuaries.

Castéra-Bouzet (French pronunciation: [kasteʁa buzɛ]; Occitan: Lo Casterar de Boset) is a commune in the Tarn-et-Garonne department in the Occitanie region in southern France.

== See also ==
- Communes of the Tarn-et-Garonne department
