= Saint-Loup, Tarn-et-Garonne =

Saint-Loup
- Commune
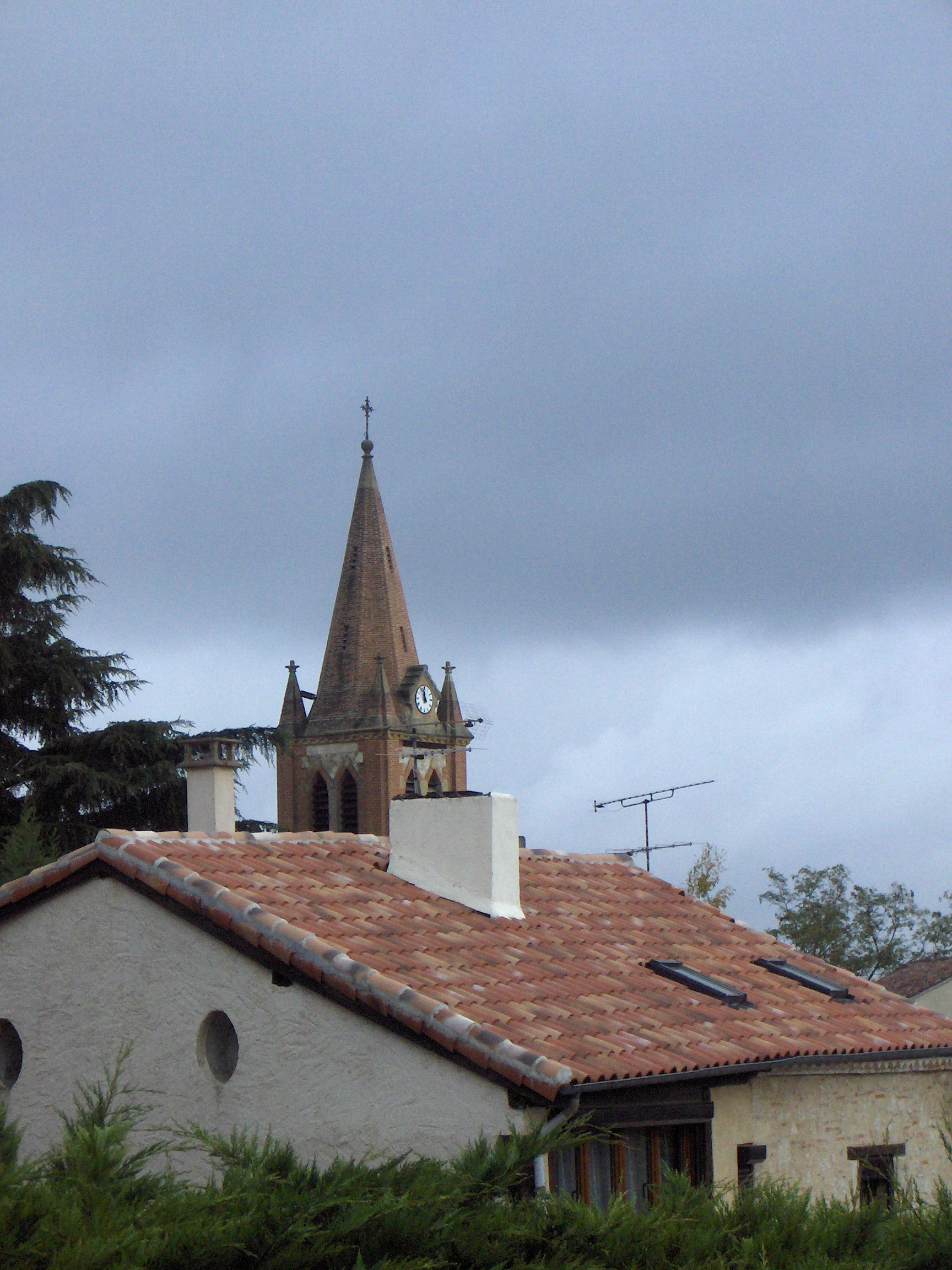
- The church tower in Saint-Loup

- Coat of arms
- Location of Saint-Loup
- Location within France Location within Occitanie
- Coordinates: 44°05′12″N 0°51′28″E
- Country: France
- Region: Occitania
- Department: Tarn-et-Garonne
- Arrondissement: Castelsarrasin
- Canton: Garonne-Lomagne-Brulhois
- Intercommunality: Deux Rives

Government
  - Mayor (2020–2026): Stéphane Rebel
- Area^{1}: 14.21 km^{2} (5.49 sq mi)
- Elevation: 120 m (390 ft)
- Highest elevation: 163 m (535 ft)
- Lowest elevation: 51 m (167 ft)
- Population (2023): 531
  - Density: 37.4/km^{2} (96.8/sq mi)
- Time zone: UTC+01:00 (CET)
  - Summer (DST): UTC+02:00 (CEST)
- INSEE/Postal code: 82165 /82340
- ^{1} French Land Register data, which excludes lakes, ponds, glaciers > 1 km^{2} (0.386 sq mi or 247 acres) and river estuaries.

Saint-Loup (French pronunciation: [sɛ̃ lu]; Occitan: Sent Lop) French commune located in the west of the department of Tarn-et-Garonne, in region Occitanie. Historically and culturally, the commune is in Lomagne, a former district of the Ancient provinces of France called Gascogne having the title of a viscounty, nicknamed “ French Tuscany.

Exposed to an altered oceanic climate, it is drained by the Garonne, the Arrats and various other small rivers. The commune has a natural heritage: a Natura 2000 site (“Garonne, Ariège, Hers, Salat, Pique et Neste”), a protected area (the “course of the Garonne, of the Aveyron, Viaur and Tarn) and four Natural zone of ecological, fauna and flora interest|natural zones of ecological, fauna and flora interest.

== History ==
Made up of three ancient parishes (Saint-Martin de Christinag, Saint-Jean de Castel and Saint-Loup forming a priory), the parish of Saint-Loup depended on the jurisdiction of Auvillar.

Note also the ephemeral parish of Saint-Michel-de-Lastours and its bastide built near an artificial mound on the Agre plateau.

It was united during the Revolution with half of the parish of Saint-Martial en Condomois to form the commune of Bouque-de-Rax, the Arrats river flowing into the Garonne in the commune.

== See also ==
- Communes of the Tarn-et-Garonne department
