= Lachapelle, Tarn-et-Garonne =

Lachapelle
- Commune
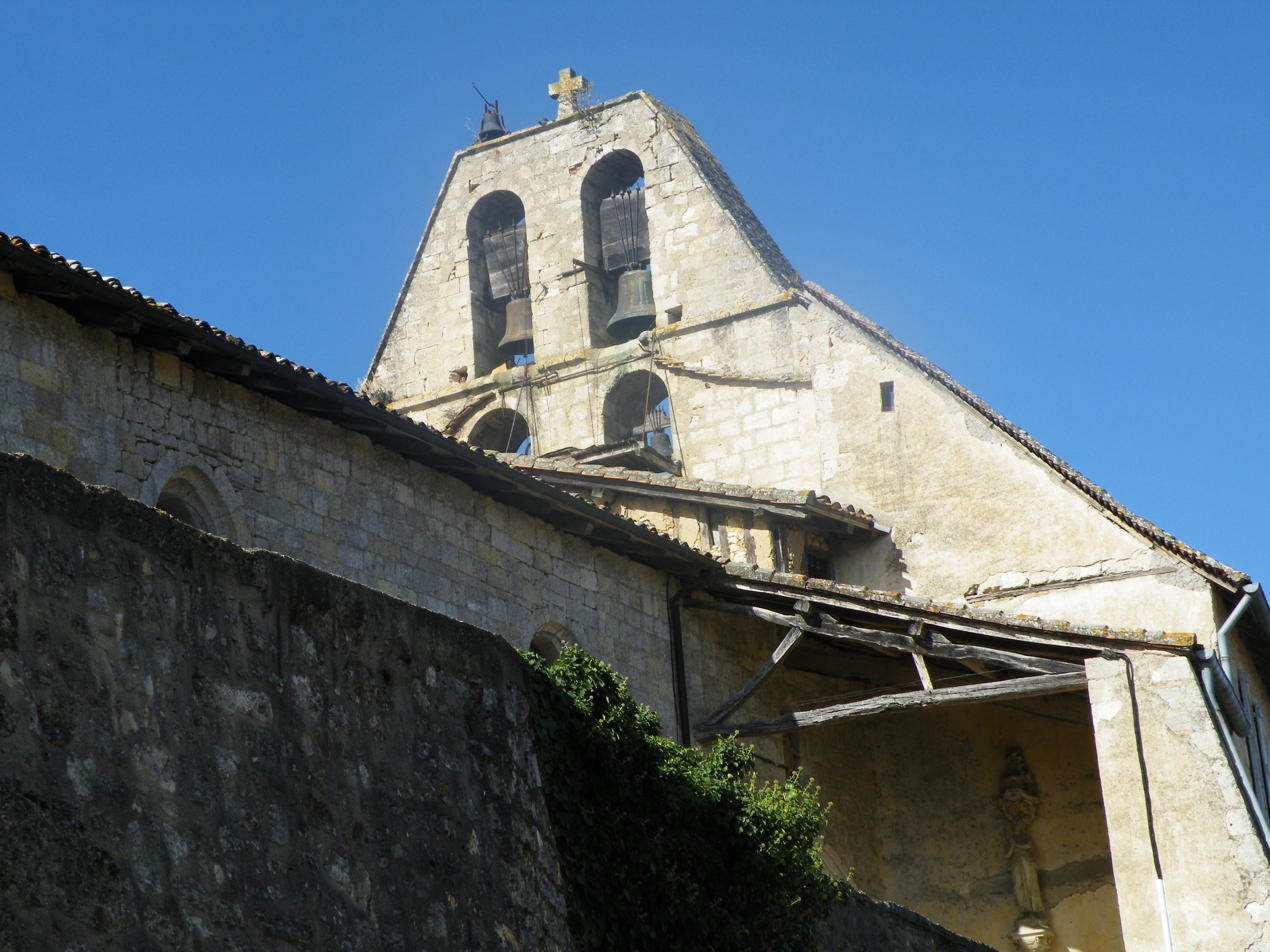
- The church in Lachapelle
- Location of Lachapelle
- Location within France Location within Occitanie
- Coordinates: 43°59′11″N 0°50′36″E
- Country: France
- Region: Occitania
- Department: Tarn-et-Garonne
- Arrondissement: Castelsarrasin
- Canton: Garonne-Lomagne-Brulhois
- Intercommunality: Lomagne Tarn-et-Garonnaise

Government
  - Mayor (2020–2026): Marcel Gasquet
- Area^{1}: 10.87 km^{2} (4.20 sq mi)
- Elevation: 130 m (430 ft)
- Highest elevation: 228 m (748 ft)
- Lowest elevation: 75 m (246 ft)
- Population (2023): 119
  - Density: 10.9/km^{2} (28.4/sq mi)
- Time zone: UTC+01:00 (CET)
  - Summer (DST): UTC+02:00 (CEST)
- INSEE/Postal code: 82083 /82120
- ^{1} French Land Register data, which excludes lakes, ponds, glaciers > 1 km^{2} (0.386 sq mi or 247 acres) and river estuaries.

Lachapelle (French pronunciation: [laʃapɛl]; Occitan: La Capèra) is a commune in the Tarn-et-Garonne department in the Occitanie region in southern France.

== See also ==
- Communes of the Tarn-et-Garonne department
