= Saint-Cirice =

- Commune
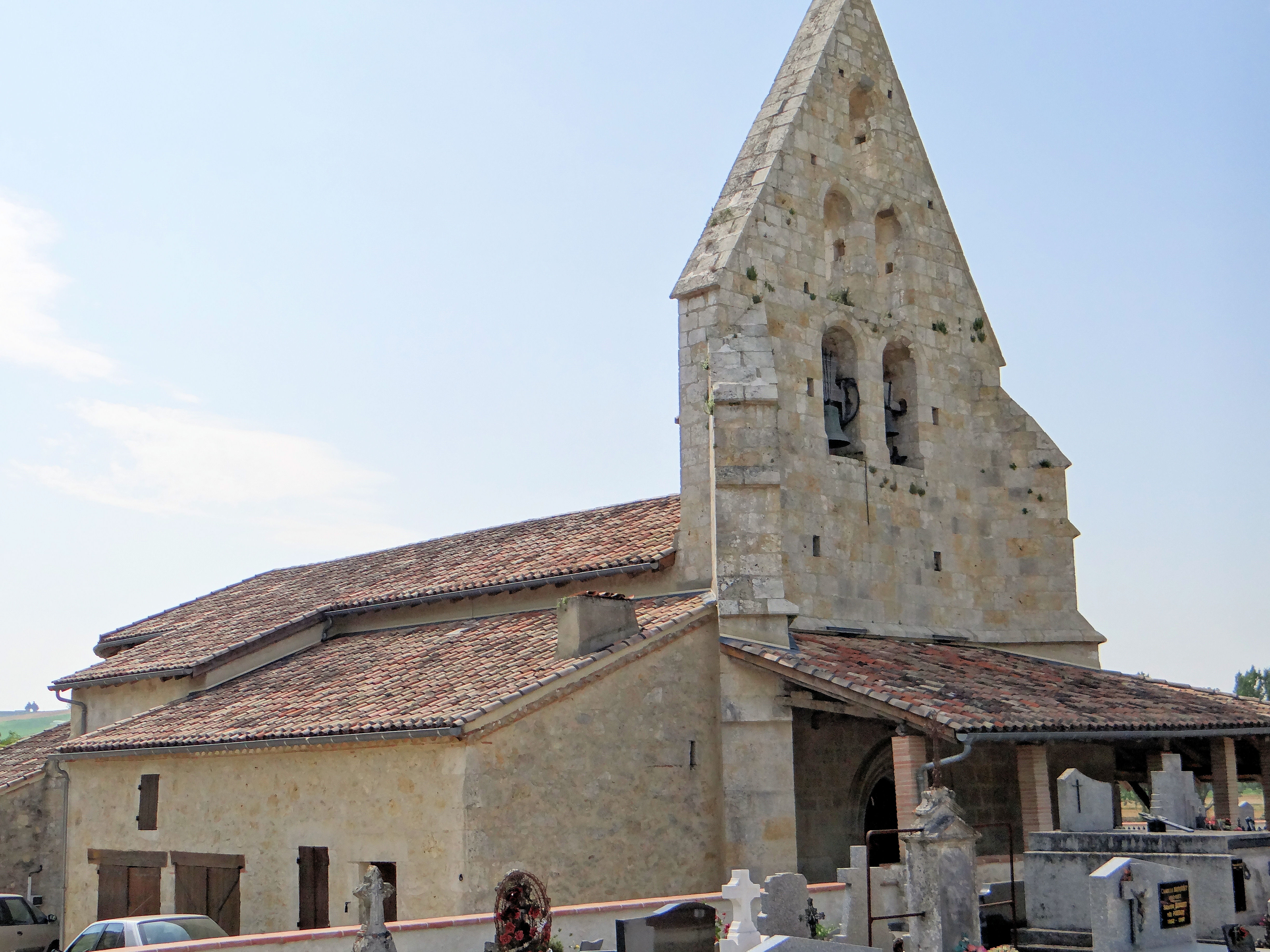
- The church of Saint-Cyr-et-Sainte-Juliette, in Saint-Cirice
- Location of Saint-Cirice
- Location within France Location within Occitanie
- Coordinates: 44°03′05″N 0°50′57″E
- Country: France
- Region: Occitania
- Department: Tarn-et-Garonne
- Arrondissement: Castelsarrasin
- Canton: Garonne-Lomagne-Brulhois
- Intercommunality: Deux Rives

Government
  - Mayor (2020–2026): Raymond Benvenuto
- Area^{1}: 8.92 km^{2} (3.44 sq mi)
- Elevation: 72 m (236 ft)
- Highest elevation: 198 m (650 ft)
- Lowest elevation: 59 m (194 ft)
- Population (2023): 157
  - Density: 17.6/km^{2} (45.6/sq mi)
- Time zone: UTC+01:00 (CET)
  - Summer (DST): UTC+02:00 (CEST)
- INSEE/Postal code: 82158 /82340
- ^{1} French Land Register data, which excludes lakes, ponds, glaciers > 1 km^{2} (0.386 sq mi or 247 acres) and river estuaries.

Saint-Cirice (French pronunciation: [sɛ̃ siʁis]; Occitan: Sent Cirici) is a commune in the Tarn-et-Garonne department in the Occitanie region in southern France.

== See also ==
- Communes of the Tarn-et-Garonne department
