= Merles =

- Commune
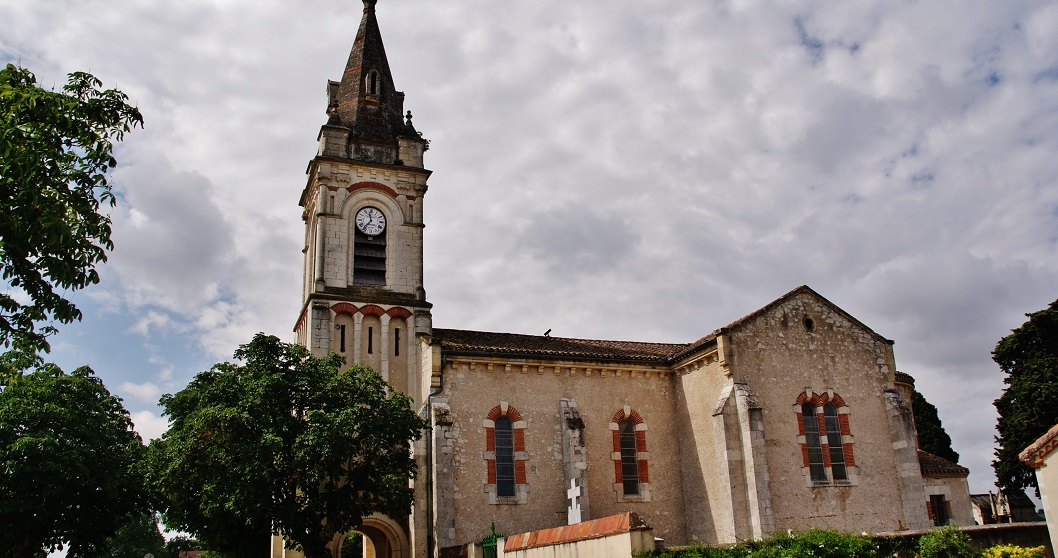
- Church of Merles.
- Location of Merles
- Location within France Location within Occitanie
- Coordinates: 44°03′32″N 0°58′12″E
- Country: France
- Region: Occitania
- Department: Tarn-et-Garonne
- Arrondissement: Castelsarrasin
- Canton: Garonne-Lomagne-Brulhois
- Intercommunality: Deux Rives

Government
  - Mayor (2020–2026): Serge Sergas
- Area^{1}: 7.02 km^{2} (2.71 sq mi)
- Elevation: 70 m (230 ft)
- Highest elevation: 83 m (272 ft)
- Lowest elevation: 56 m (184 ft)
- Population (2023): 200
  - Density: 28/km^{2} (74/sq mi)
- Time zone: UTC+01:00 (CET)
  - Summer (DST): UTC+02:00 (CEST)
- INSEE/Postal code: 82109 /82210
- ^{1} French Land Register data, which excludes lakes, ponds, glaciers > 1 km^{2} (0.386 sq mi or 247 acres) and river estuaries.

Merles (French pronunciation: [mɛʁl]; Occitan: Mèrles) is a commune of the Tarn-et-Garonne department in the Occitanie region of southern France.

== See also ==
- Communes of the Tarn-et-Garonne department
