= Puygaillard-de-Lomagne =

- Commune
- Location of Puygaillard-de-Lomagne
- Location within France Location within Occitanie
- Coordinates: 43°58′08″N 0°53′52″E
- Country: France
- Region: Occitania
- Department: Tarn-et-Garonne
- Arrondissement: Castelsarrasin
- Canton: Garonne-Lomagne-Brulhois
- Intercommunality: Lomagne Tarn-et-Garonnaise

Government
  - Mayor (2020–2026): Marc Pierre Laporte
- Area^{1}: 7.08 km^{2} (2.73 sq mi)
- Elevation: 124 m (407 ft)
- Highest elevation: 232 m (761 ft)
- Lowest elevation: 119 m (390 ft)
- Population (2023): 54
  - Density: 7.6/km^{2} (20/sq mi)
- Time zone: UTC+01:00 (CET)
  - Summer (DST): UTC+02:00 (CEST)
- INSEE/Postal code: 82146 /82120
- ^{1} French Land Register data, which excludes lakes, ponds, glaciers > 1 km^{2} (0.386 sq mi or 247 acres) and river estuaries.

Puygaillard-de-Lomagne (French pronunciation: [pɥiɡajaʁ də lɔmaɲ]; Occitan: Puèigalhard de Lomanha) is a commune in the Tarn-et-Garonne department in the Occitanie region in southern France.

== See also ==
- Communes of the Tarn-et-Garonne department
