= Saint-Nicolas-de-la-Grave =

- Commune
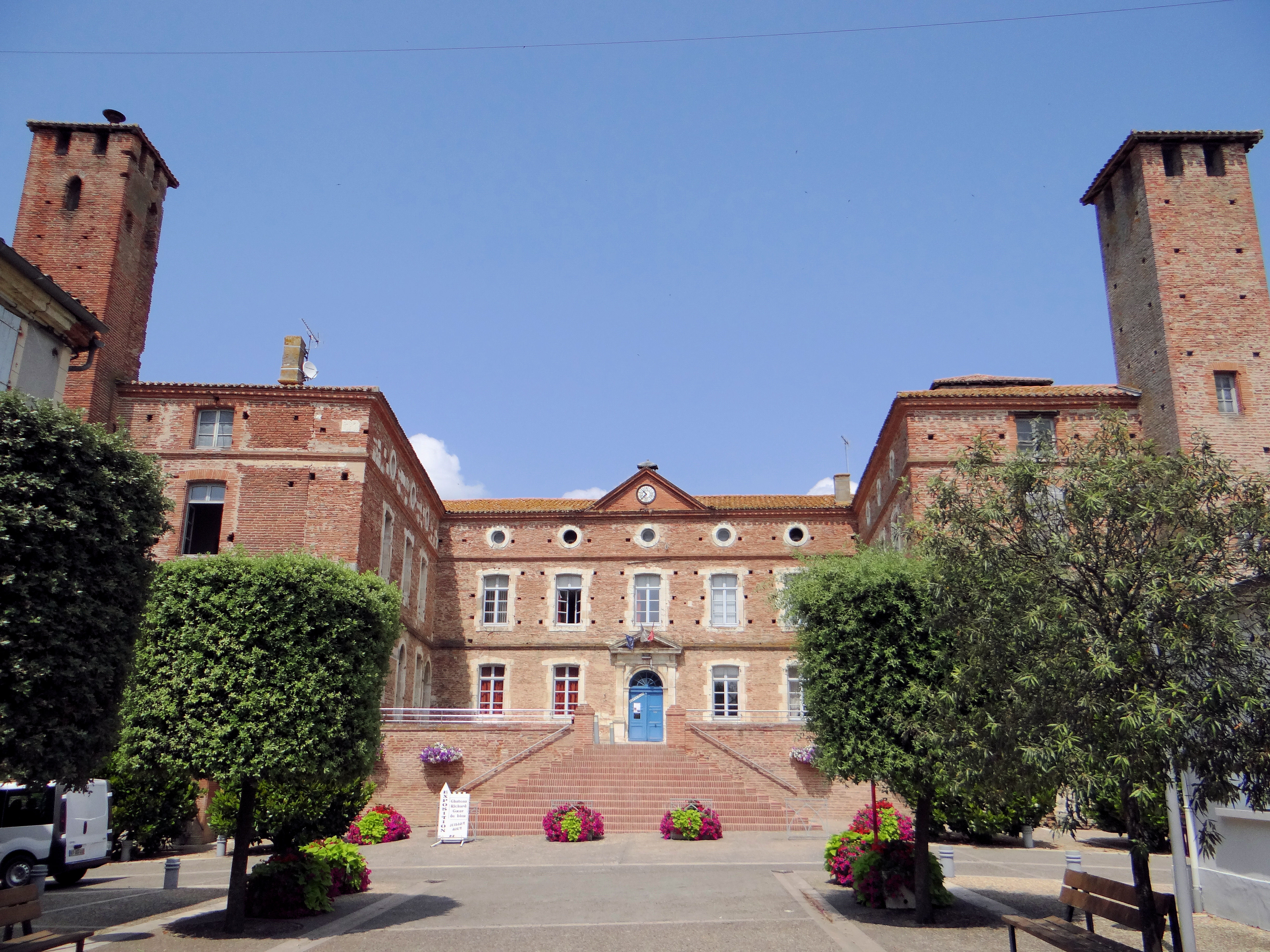
- The Château of Richard Cœur de Lion, in Saint-Nicolas-de-la-Grave

- Coat of arms
- Location of Saint-Nicolas-de-la-Grave
- Location within France Location within Occitanie
- Coordinates: 44°03′52″N 1°01′25″E
- Country: France
- Region: Occitania
- Department: Tarn-et-Garonne
- Arrondissement: Castelsarrasin
- Canton: Garonne-Lomagne-Brulhois

Government
  - Mayor (2020–2026): Bernard Bouche
- Area^{1}: 29.34 km^{2} (11.33 sq mi)
- Elevation: 76 m (249 ft)
- Highest elevation: 88 m (289 ft)
- Lowest elevation: 59 m (194 ft)
- Population (2023): 2,281
  - Density: 77.74/km^{2} (201.4/sq mi)
- Time zone: UTC+01:00 (CET)
  - Summer (DST): UTC+02:00 (CEST)
- INSEE/Postal code: 82169 /82210
- ^{1} French Land Register data, which excludes lakes, ponds, glaciers > 1 km^{2} (0.386 sq mi or 247 acres) and river estuaries.

Saint-Nicolas-de-la-Grave (French pronunciation: [sɛ̃ nikɔla də la ɡʁav]; Languedocien: Sent Micolau de la Grava) is a commune in the Tarn-et-Garonne department in the Occitanie region in southern France. Antoine de la Mothe, sieur de Cadillac, the founder of the American city of Detroit was born here in 1658.

== History ==
The surroundings of Saint-Nicolas-de-la-Grave have been occupied since Roman times; the ruins of a villa were found near a place called Marcassus, 2.9 km by road on the left bank of the Sère (Stream) and a capital Corinthian order in white marble was discovered at a place called es Arênes. Fragments of tile, pottery and amphorae were found to the west of the village and at a place called les Patots, a very old path was an old Roman road.

In the 12th century, the monks of Moissac built a castle on the left bank of the Garonne, facing the confluence of the Tarn, on the edge of the plateau which dominates the alluvial plain. Because the town is a strategic crossroads, it was disputed by the viscounts of Lomagne. Around the castle, an agglomeration develops little by little, with a port at the base of the castle. In 1135, Guillaume, Abbot of Moissac joins the viscount Saxetus de Lomagne and the viscountess Sybille d'Auvillar to grant a charter to this village which becomes the "sauveté" of Saint Nicolas (a sauveté is an agglomeration founded by the monasteries prior to the creation of the bastides): the inhabitants are free within the enclosure from the city. In an additional act to the charter, the Viscount of Lomagne swears to the monks and inhabitants of Saint-Nicolas never to take away their city or their castle and to protect them against invaders.

Around 1185, during his victorious campaign in Quercy during which he conquered sixteen castles, the king of England, Richard Cœur-de-Lion stayed at the castle and had the front tower, known as the Tour des Anglais, built there. Abbot Bernard de Montaigu, who held the abbey chair of Moissac from 1260 to 1295, built the west wing of the castle and its two four-metre towers with heights of 25 and 28 metres.

At the end of the 13th century, the castle was completed with its four towers; it measures 125 metres on its east-west axis and 100 metres on its north-south axis. The town plan is simple; it is a rectangle oriented east-west, 440 metres long by 200 wide, crossed by a main axis and surrounded by ramparts (now disappeared and replaced by boulevards) with in the center a vast square.

In 1345, Saint-Nicolas-de-la-Grave was a fortress.

Before 1806, the town absorbed the neighboring town of Moutet.

== Population ==
Historical population
Year	Pop.	±% p.a.
1968	1,711	—
1975	1,722	+0.09%
1982	1,705	−0.14%
1990	2,024	+2.17%
1999	2,009	−0.08%
2007	2,131	+0.74%
2012	2,168	+0.34%
2017	2,260	+0.83%
2023	2,281	+0.15%
Source: INSEE

== See also ==
- Communes of the Tarn-et-Garonne department
- André Abbal
