= Balignac =

- Commune
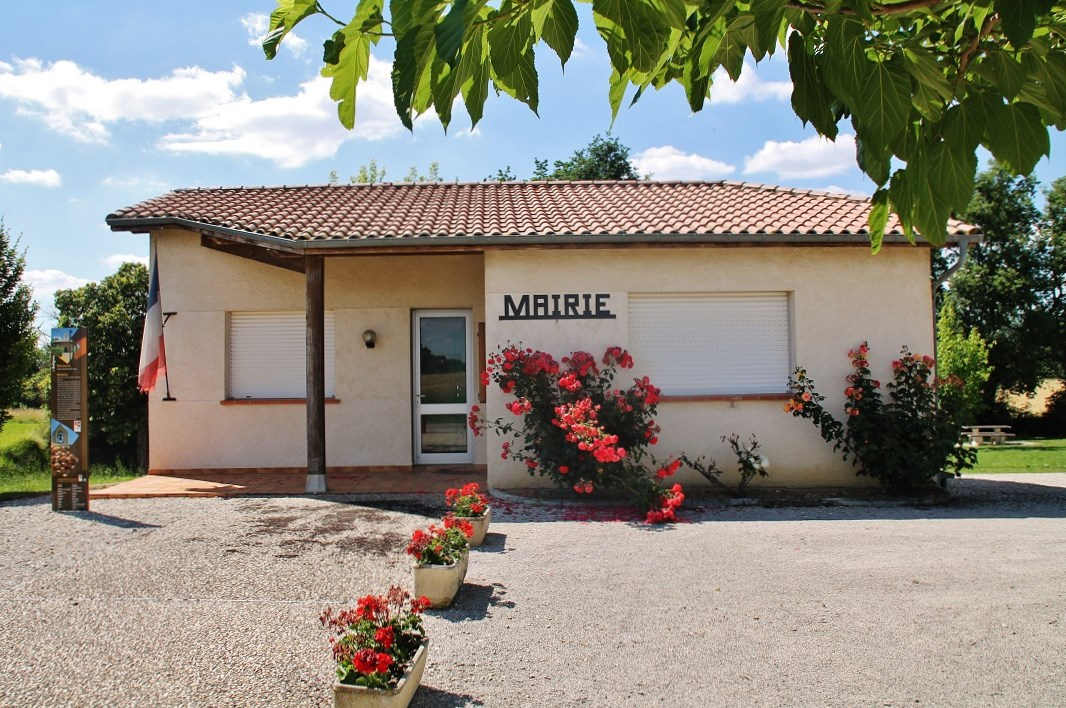
- Location of Balignac
- Location within France Location within Occitanie
- Coordinates: 43°57′23″N 0°52′31″E
- Country: France
- Region: Occitania
- Department: Tarn-et-Garonne
- Arrondissement: Castelsarrasin
- Canton: Garonne-Lomagne-Brulhois
- Intercommunality: Lomagne Tarn-et-Garonnaise

Government
  - Mayor (2020–2026): Alain Gaussens
- Area^{1}: 4.09 km^{2} (1.58 sq mi)
- Elevation: 236 m (774 ft)
- Highest elevation: 234 m (768 ft)
- Lowest elevation: 129 m (423 ft)
- Population (2023): 41
  - Density: 10/km^{2} (26/sq mi)
- Time zone: UTC+01:00 (CET)
  - Summer (DST): UTC+02:00 (CEST)
- INSEE/Postal code: 82009 /82120
- ^{1} French Land Register data, which excludes lakes, ponds, glaciers > 1 km^{2} (0.386 sq mi or 247 acres) and river estuaries.

Balignac (French pronunciation: [baliɲak]; Occitan: Balinhac) is a commune in the Tarn-et-Garonne department in the Occitanie region in southern France.

== See also ==
- Communes of the Tarn-et-Garonne department
