= Le Pin, Tarn-et-Garonne =

Le Pin
- Commune
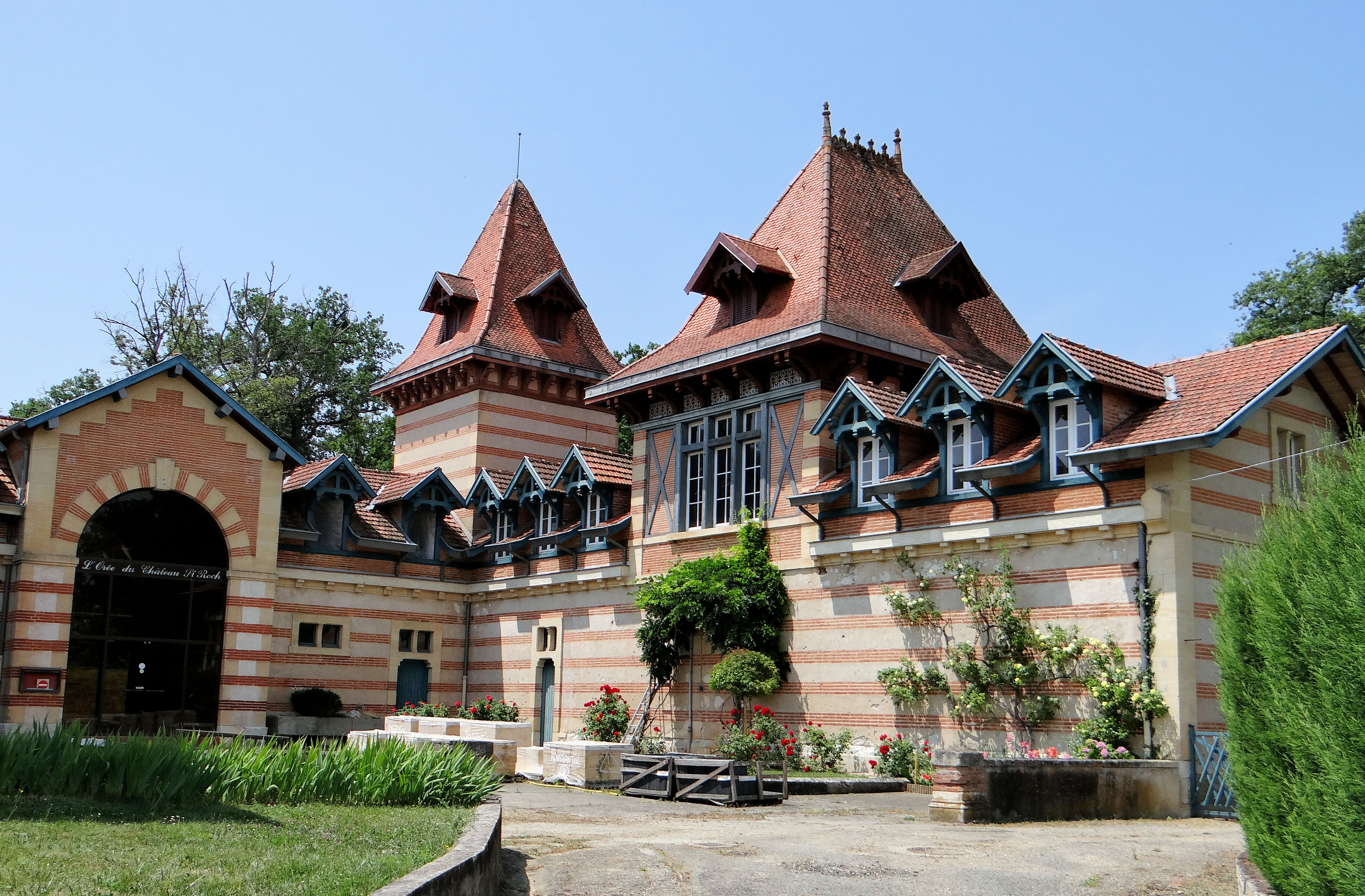
- The Château Saint-Roch, in Le Pin
- Location of Le Pin
- Location within France Location within Occitanie
- Coordinates: 44°02′10″N 0°58′08″E
- Country: France
- Region: Occitania
- Department: Tarn-et-Garonne
- Arrondissement: Castelsarrasin
- Canton: Garonne-Lomagne-Brulhois
- Intercommunality: Deux Rives

Government
  - Mayor (2020–2026): Stéphan Ratto
- Area^{1}: 4.71 km^{2} (1.82 sq mi)
- Elevation: 132 m (433 ft)
- Highest elevation: 137 m (449 ft)
- Lowest elevation: 69 m (226 ft)
- Population (2023): 111
  - Density: 23.6/km^{2} (61.0/sq mi)
- Time zone: UTC+01:00 (CET)
  - Summer (DST): UTC+02:00 (CEST)
- INSEE/Postal code: 82139 /82340
- ^{1} French Land Register data, which excludes lakes, ponds, glaciers > 1 km^{2} (0.386 sq mi or 247 acres) and river estuaries.

Le Pin (French pronunciation: [lə pɛ̃]; Occitan: Lo Pin) is a commune in the Tarn-et-Garonne department in the Occitanie region in southern France.

== See also ==
- Communes of the Tarn-et-Garonne department
