= Poupas =

- Commune
- Location of Poupas
- Location within France Location within Occitanie
- Coordinates: 43°58′05″N 0°50′29″E
- Country: France
- Region: Occitania
- Department: Tarn-et-Garonne
- Arrondissement: Castelsarrasin
- Canton: Garonne-Lomagne-Brulhois
- Intercommunality: Lomagne Tarn-et-Garonnaise

Government
  - Mayor (2020–2026): Pascal Guérin
- Area^{1}: 10.26 km^{2} (3.96 sq mi)
- Elevation: 165 m (541 ft)
- Highest elevation: 212 m (696 ft)
- Lowest elevation: 79 m (259 ft)
- Population (2023): 87
  - Density: 8.5/km^{2} (22/sq mi)
- Time zone: UTC+01:00 (CET)
  - Summer (DST): UTC+02:00 (CEST)
- INSEE/Postal code: 82143 /82120
- ^{1} French Land Register data, which excludes lakes, ponds, glaciers > 1 km^{2} (0.386 sq mi or 247 acres) and river estuaries.

Poupas is a commune in the Tarn-et-Garonne department in the Occitanie region in southern France.

== See also ==
- Communes of the Tarn-et-Garonne department
