= Montgaillard, Tarn-et-Garonne =

Montgaillard
- Commune
- Coat of arms
- Location of Montgaillard
- Location within France Location within Occitanie
- Coordinates: 43°56′01″N 0°52′37″E
- Country: France
- Region: Occitania
- Department: Tarn-et-Garonne
- Arrondissement: Castelsarrasin
- Canton: Garonne-Lomagne-Brulhois
- Intercommunality: Lomagne tarn-et-garonnaise

Government
  - Mayor (2020–2026): Sébastien Louart
- Area^{1}: 9.5 km^{2} (3.7 sq mi)
- Elevation: 250 m (820 ft)
- Highest elevation: 256 m (840 ft)
- Lowest elevation: 139 m (456 ft)
- Population (2023): 140
  - Density: 15/km^{2} (38/sq mi)
- Time zone: UTC+01:00 (CET)
  - Summer (DST): UTC+02:00 (CEST)
- INSEE/Postal code: 82129 /82120
- ^{1} French Land Register data, which excludes lakes, ponds, glaciers > 1 km^{2} (0.386 sq mi or 247 acres) and river estuaries.

Montgaillard (French pronunciation: [mɔ̃ɡajaʁ]; Occitan: Montgalhard) is a commune in the Tarn-et-Garonne department in the Occitanie region in southern France.

== See also ==
- Communes of the Tarn-et-Garonne department
