= Sistels =

- Commune
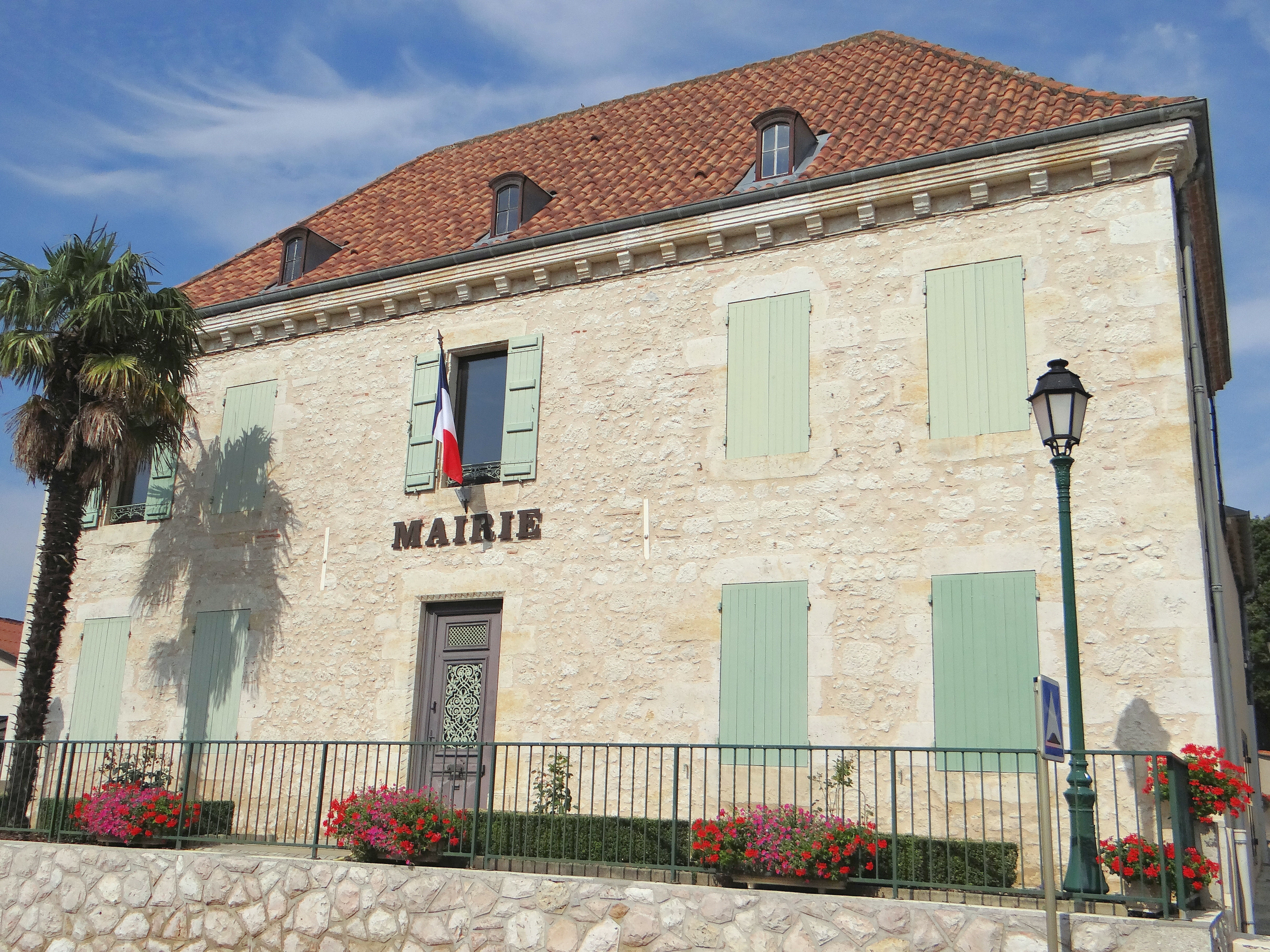
- The town hall of Sistels
- Location of Sistels
- Location within France Location within Occitanie
- Coordinates: 44°03′40″N 0°47′04″E
- Country: France
- Region: Occitania
- Department: Tarn-et-Garonne
- Arrondissement: Castelsarrasin
- Canton: Garonne-Lomagne-Brulhois
- Intercommunality: Deux Rives

Government
  - Mayor (2020–2026): Christophe Boisseau
- Area^{1}: 13.57 km^{2} (5.24 sq mi)
- Elevation: 187 m (614 ft)
- Highest elevation: 199 m (653 ft)
- Lowest elevation: 98 m (322 ft)
- Population (2023): 210
  - Density: 15/km^{2} (40/sq mi)
- Time zone: UTC+01:00 (CET)
  - Summer (DST): UTC+02:00 (CEST)
- INSEE/Postal code: 82181 /82340
- ^{1} French Land Register data, which excludes lakes, ponds, glaciers > 1 km^{2} (0.386 sq mi or 247 acres) and river estuaries.

Sistels (French pronunciation: [sistɛl]) is a commune in the Tarn-et-Garonne department in the Occitanie region in southern France.

== See also ==
- Communes of the Tarn-et-Garonne department
