= Gramont, Tarn-et-Garonne =

Gramont
- Commune
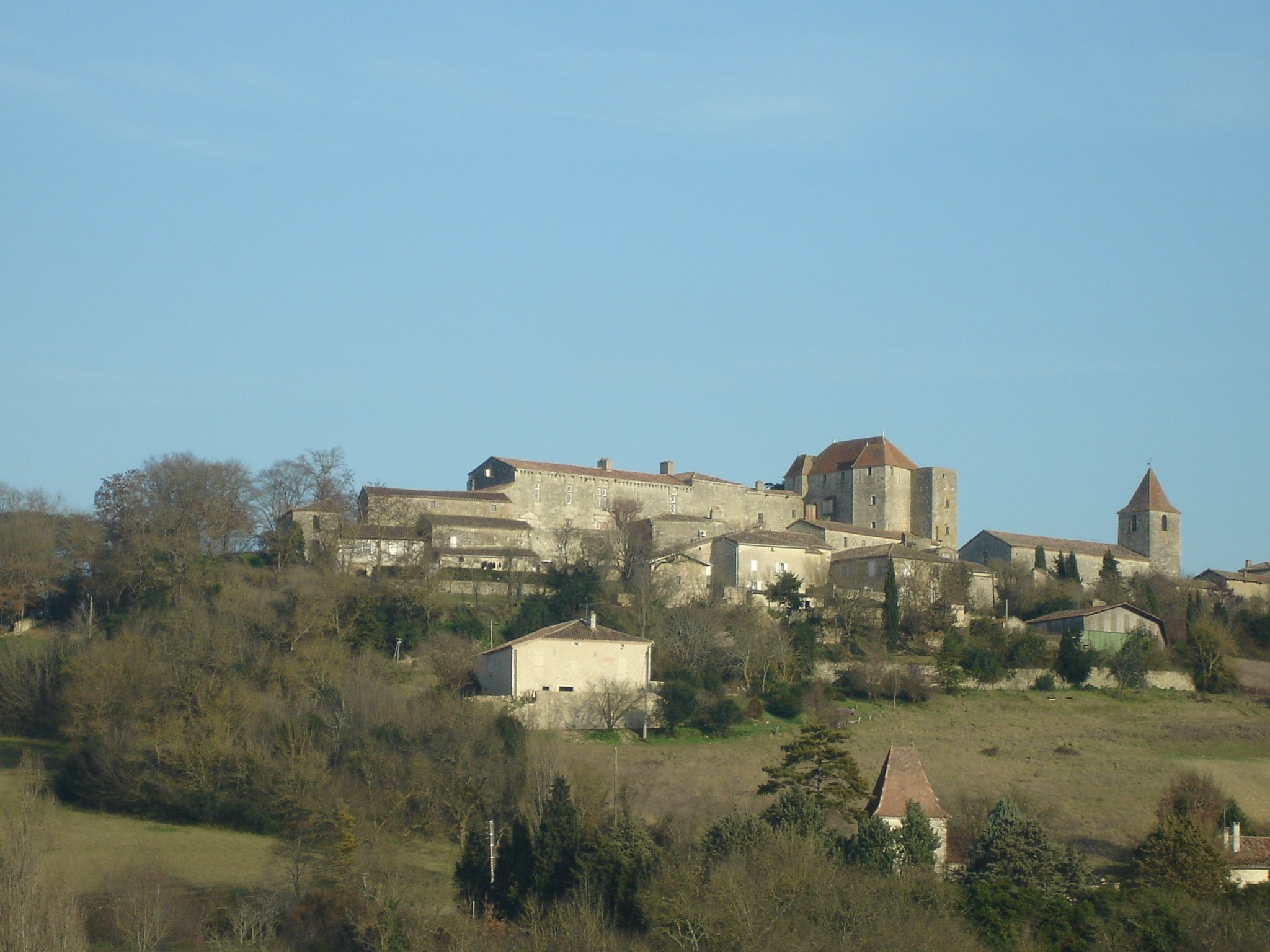
- A general view of the village of Gramont

- Coat of arms
- Location of Gramont
- Location within France Location within Occitanie
- Coordinates: 43°56′16″N 0°46′06″E
- Country: France
- Region: Occitania
- Department: Tarn-et-Garonne
- Arrondissement: Castelsarrasin
- Canton: Garonne-Lomagne-Brulhois
- Intercommunality: Lomagne Tarn-et-Garonnaise

Government
  - Mayor (2020–2026): Claude Triffault
- Area^{1}: 13.58 km^{2} (5.24 sq mi)
- Elevation: 200 m (660 ft)
- Highest elevation: 222 m (728 ft)
- Lowest elevation: 81 m (266 ft)
- Population (2023): 130
  - Density: 9.6/km^{2} (25/sq mi)
- Time zone: UTC+01:00 (CET)
  - Summer (DST): UTC+02:00 (CEST)
- INSEE/Postal code: 82074 /82120
- ^{1} French Land Register data, which excludes lakes, ponds, glaciers > 1 km^{2} (0.386 sq mi or 247 acres) and river estuaries.

Gramont (French pronunciation: [ɡʁamɔ̃]) is a commune in the Tarn-et-Garonne department in the Occitanie region in southern France.

== See also ==
- Communes of the Tarn-et-Garonne department
