= Mansonville =

- Commune
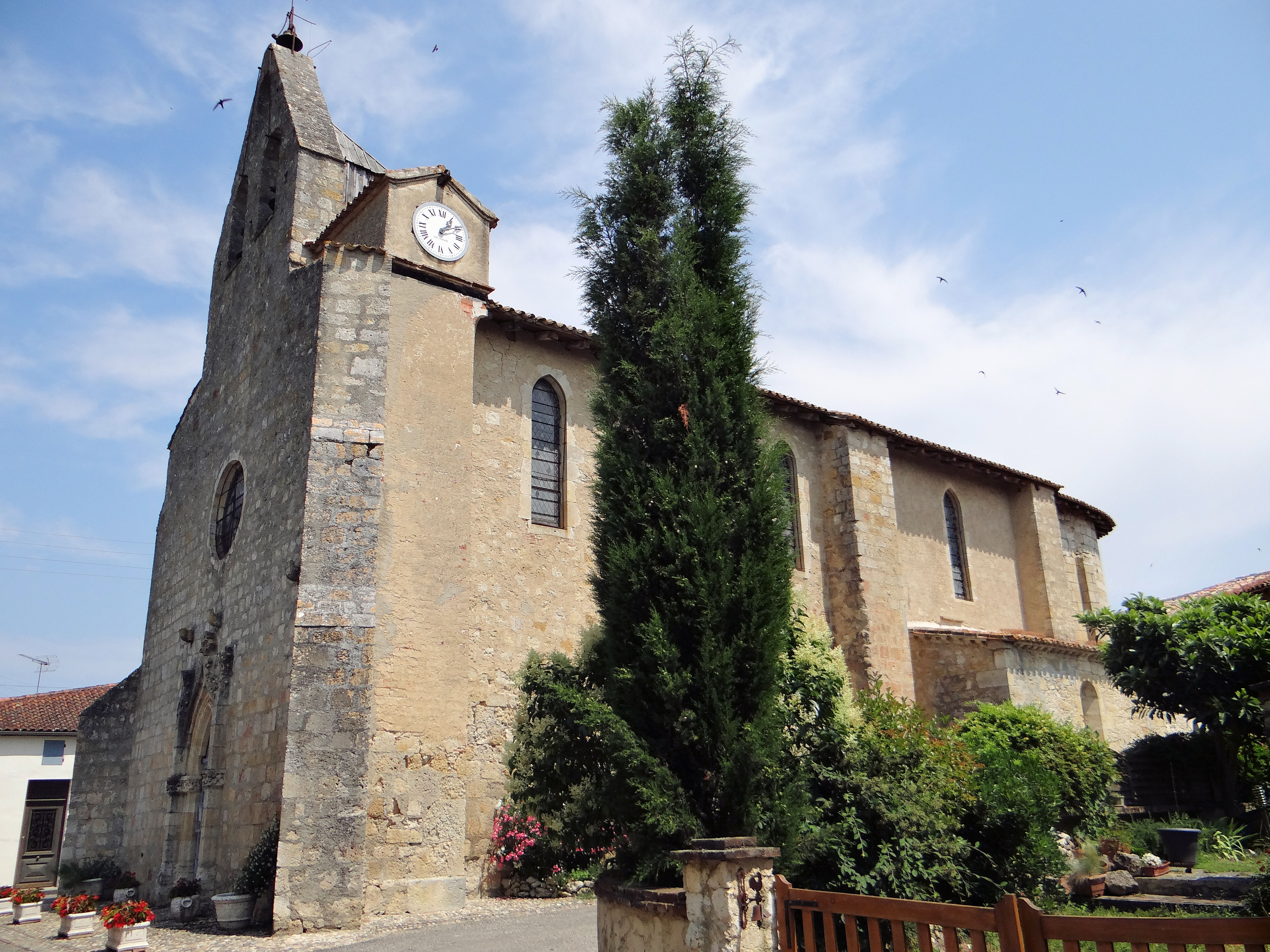
- The church of Saint-Saturnin, in Mansonville

- Coat of arms
- Location of Mansonville
- Location within France Location within Occitanie
- Coordinates: 44°01′03″N 0°50′30″E
- Country: France
- Region: Occitania
- Department: Tarn-et-Garonne
- Arrondissement: Castelsarrasin
- Canton: Garonne-Lomagne-Brulhois
- Intercommunality: Deux Rives

Government
  - Mayor (2024–2026): Vanessa Escude
- Area^{1}: 15.45 km^{2} (5.97 sq mi)
- Elevation: 90 m (300 ft)
- Highest elevation: 202 m (663 ft)
- Lowest elevation: 67 m (220 ft)
- Population (2023): 310
  - Density: 20/km^{2} (52/sq mi)
- Time zone: UTC+01:00 (CET)
  - Summer (DST): UTC+02:00 (CEST)
- INSEE/Postal code: 82102 /82120
- ^{1} French Land Register data, which excludes lakes, ponds, glaciers > 1 km^{2} (0.386 sq mi or 247 acres) and river estuaries.

Mansonville (French pronunciation: [mɑ̃sɔ̃vil]; Occitan: Mansonvila) is a commune in the Tarn-et-Garonne department in the Occitanie region in southern France.

== See also ==
- Communes of the Tarn-et-Garonne department
