= Dunes, Tarn-et-Garonne =

Dunes
- Commune
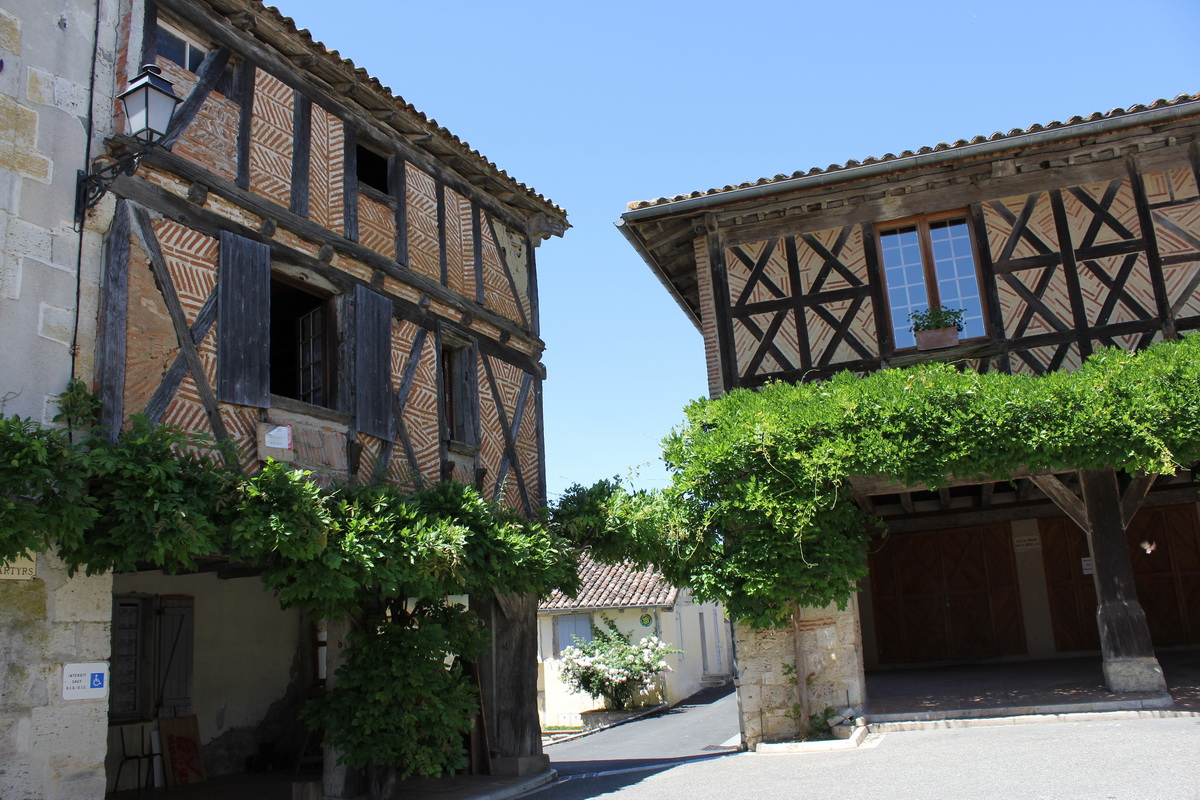
- A timbered house, in Dunes

- Coat of arms
- Location of Dunes
- Location within France Location within Occitanie
- Coordinates: 44°05′18″N 0°46′18″E
- Country: France
- Region: Occitania
- Department: Tarn-et-Garonne
- Arrondissement: Castelsarrasin
- Canton: Garonne-Lomagne-Brulhois
- Intercommunality: Deux Rives

Government
  - Mayor (2020–2026): Alain Alary
- Area^{1}: 23.19 km^{2} (8.95 sq mi)
- Elevation: 121 m (397 ft)
- Highest elevation: 186 m (610 ft)
- Lowest elevation: 57 m (187 ft)
- Population (2023): 1,226
  - Density: 52.87/km^{2} (136.9/sq mi)
- Time zone: UTC+01:00 (CET)
  - Summer (DST): UTC+02:00 (CEST)
- INSEE/Postal code: 82050 /82340
- ^{1} French Land Register data, which excludes lakes, ponds, glaciers > 1 km^{2} (0.386 sq mi or 247 acres) and river estuaries.

Dunes (French pronunciation: [dyn]; Occitan: Dunas) is a commune in the Tarn-et-Garonne department in the Occitanie region in southern France.

== Geography ==
The river Auroue forms all of the commune's western border.

== See also ==
- Communes of the Tarn-et-Garonne department
