= Saint-Jean-du-Bouzet =

- Commune
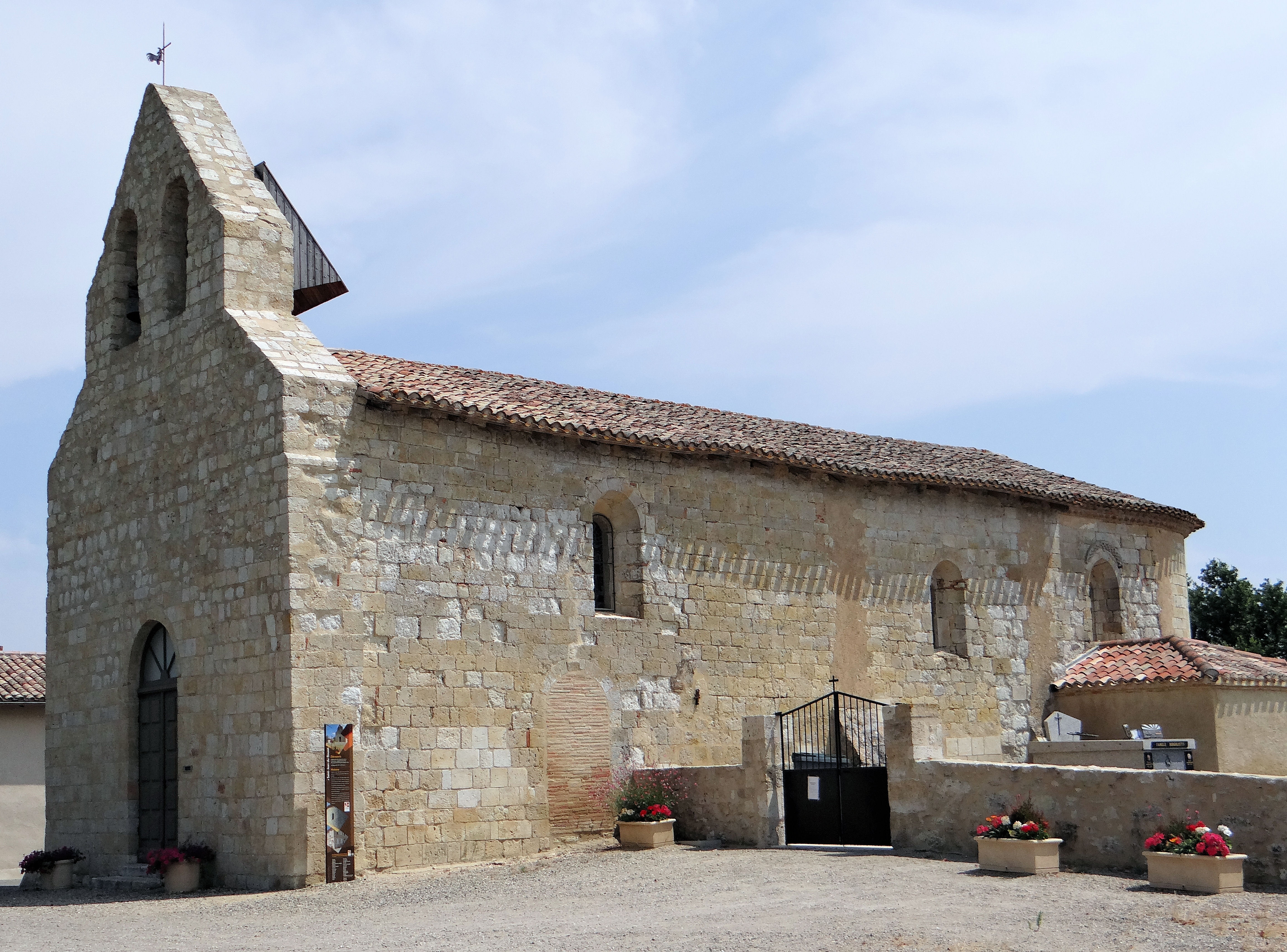
- The church of Saint-Jean, in Saint-Jean-du-Bouzet
- Location of Saint-Jean-du-Bouzet
- Location within France Location within Occitanie
- Coordinates: 43°59′27″N 0°52′33″E
- Country: France
- Region: Occitania
- Department: Tarn-et-Garonne
- Arrondissement: Castelsarrasin
- Canton: Garonne-Lomagne-Brulhois
- Intercommunality: Lomagne Tarn-et-Garonnaise

Government
  - Mayor (2020–2026): Geneviève Duilhe
- Area^{1}: 7.74 km^{2} (2.99 sq mi)
- Elevation: 130 m (430 ft)
- Highest elevation: 228 m (748 ft)
- Lowest elevation: 107 m (351 ft)
- Population (2023): 54
  - Density: 7.0/km^{2} (18/sq mi)
- Time zone: UTC+01:00 (CET)
  - Summer (DST): UTC+02:00 (CEST)
- INSEE/Postal code: 82163 /82120
- ^{1} French Land Register data, which excludes lakes, ponds, glaciers > 1 km^{2} (0.386 sq mi or 247 acres) and river estuaries.

Saint-Jean-du-Bouzet (French pronunciation: [sɛ̃ ʒɑ̃ dy buzɛ]; Languedocien: Sent Joan deu Boset) is a commune in the Tarn-et-Garonne department in the Occitanie region in southern France.

== See also ==
- Communes of the Tarn-et-Garonne department
