= Asques, Tarn-et-Garonne =

Asques
- Commune
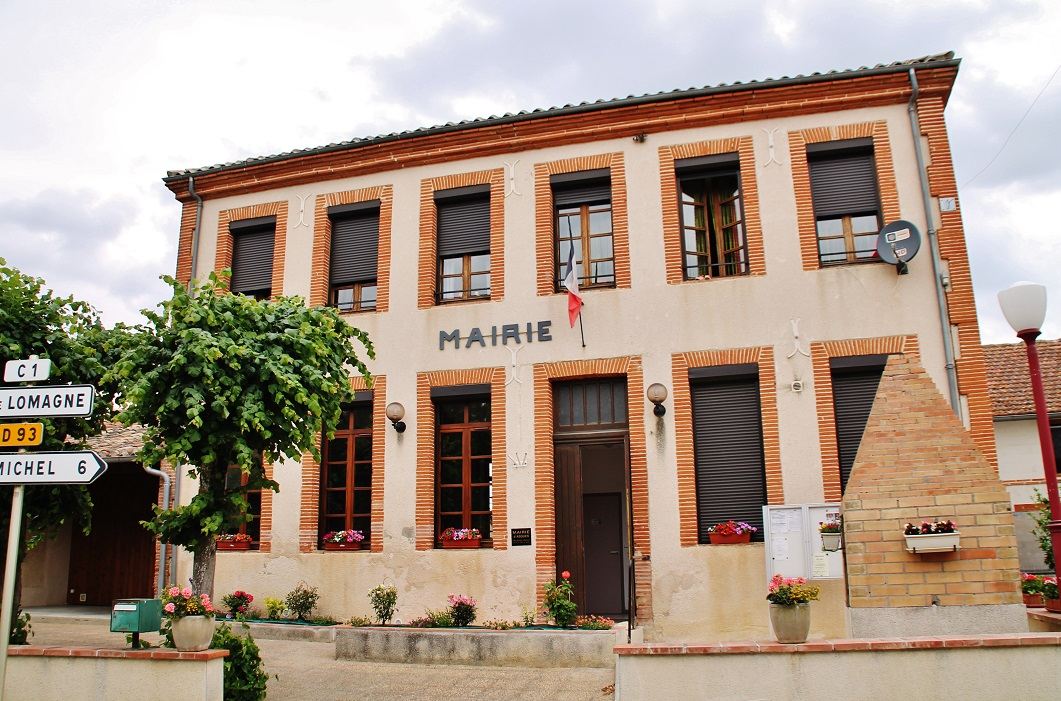
- Location of Asques
- Location within France Location within Occitanie
- Coordinates: 43°59′24″N 0°57′39″E
- Country: France
- Region: Occitania
- Department: Tarn-et-Garonne
- Arrondissement: Castelsarrasin
- Canton: Garonne-Lomagne-Brulhois
- Intercommunality: CC Lomagne Tarn-et-Garonnaise

Government
  - Mayor (2020–2026): Alain Falgayras
- Area^{1}: 10.61 km^{2} (4.10 sq mi)
- Elevation: 230 m (750 ft)
- Highest elevation: 187 m (614 ft)
- Lowest elevation: 80 m (260 ft)
- Population (2023): 133
  - Density: 12.5/km^{2} (32.5/sq mi)
- Time zone: UTC+01:00 (CET)
  - Summer (DST): UTC+02:00 (CEST)
- INSEE/Postal code: 82004 /82120
- ^{1} French Land Register data, which excludes lakes, ponds, glaciers > 1 km^{2} (0.386 sq mi or 247 acres) and river estuaries.

Asques (French pronunciation: [ask]; Occitan: Ascas) is a commune in the Tarn-et-Garonne department in the Occitanie region in southern France.

== See also ==
- Communes of the Tarn-et-Garonne department
