= Marsac, Tarn-et-Garonne =

Marsac
- Commune
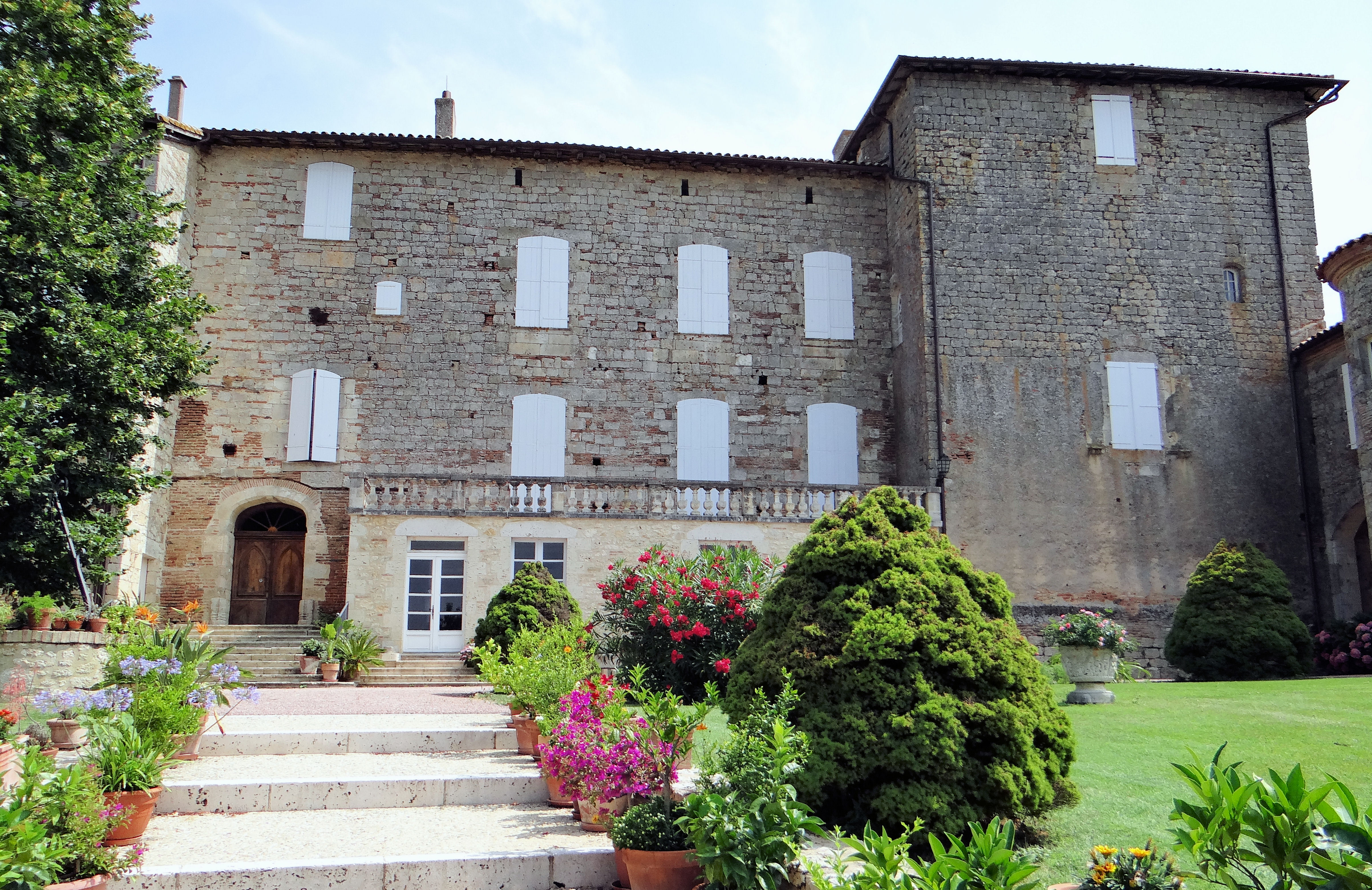
- The Château of Marsac
- Location of Marsac
- Location within France Location within Occitanie
- Coordinates: 43°56′37″N 0°49′22″E
- Country: France
- Region: Occitania
- Department: Tarn-et-Garonne
- Arrondissement: Castelsarrasin
- Canton: Garonne-Lomagne-Brulhois

Government
  - Mayor (2020–2026): André Auzeric
- Area^{1}: 14.89 km^{2} (5.75 sq mi)
- Elevation: 230 m (750 ft)
- Highest elevation: 248 m (814 ft)
- Lowest elevation: 80 m (260 ft)
- Population (2023): 178
  - Density: 12.0/km^{2} (31.0/sq mi)
- Time zone: UTC+01:00 (CET)
  - Summer (DST): UTC+02:00 (CEST)
- INSEE/Postal code: 82104 /82120
- ^{1} French Land Register data, which excludes lakes, ponds, glaciers > 1 km^{2} (0.386 sq mi or 247 acres) and river estuaries.

Marsac (French pronunciation: [maʁsak]; Occitan: Marçac) is a commune in the Tarn-et-Garonne department in the Occitanie region in southern France.

== See also ==
- Communes of the Tarn-et-Garonne department
