= Donzac, Tarn-et-Garonne =

Donzac
- Commune
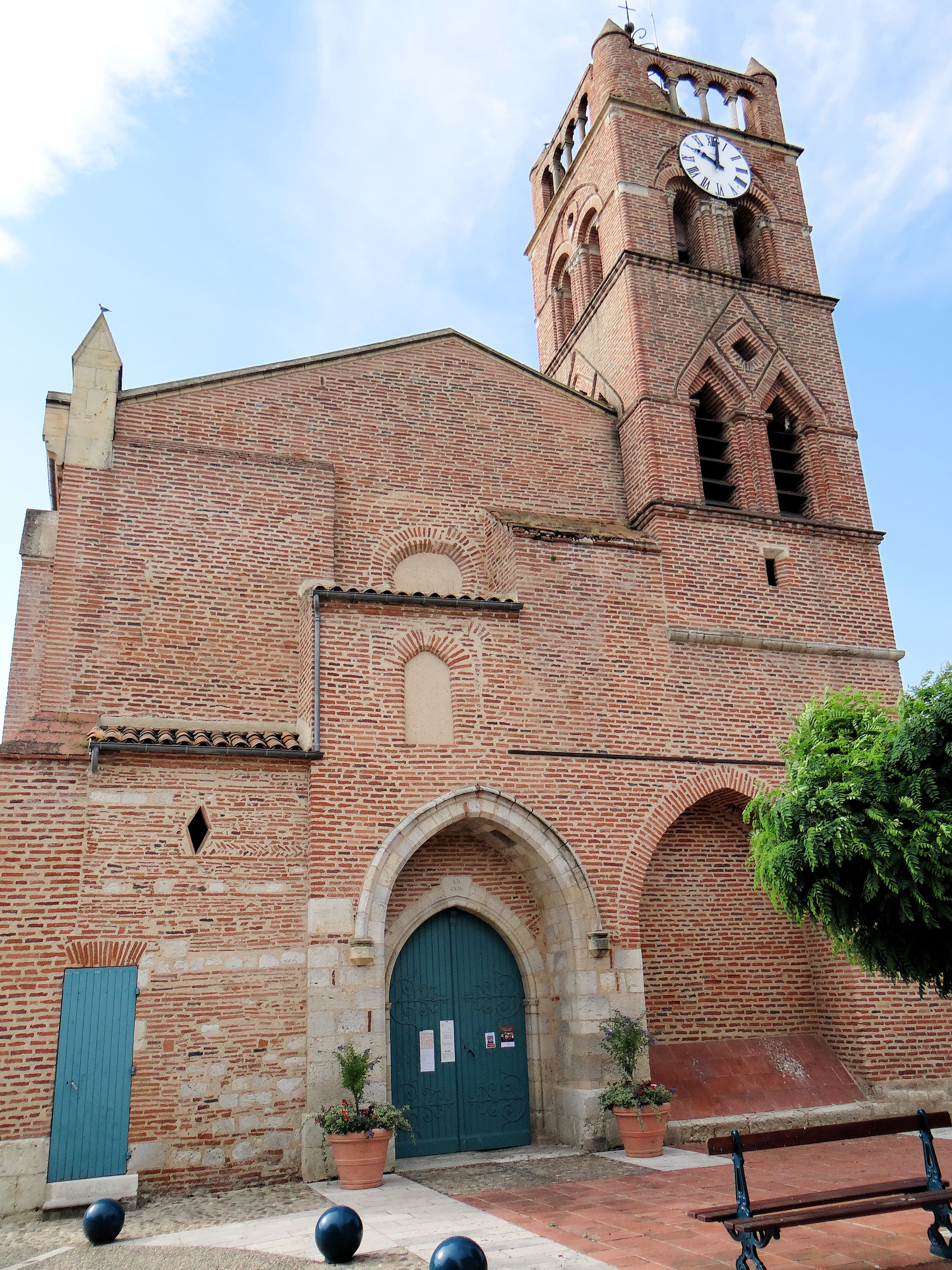
- The church of the Assumption, in Donzac
- Location of Donzac
- Location within France Location within Occitanie
- Coordinates: 44°06′38″N 0°49′15″E
- Country: France
- Region: Occitania
- Department: Tarn-et-Garonne
- Arrondissement: Castelsarrasin
- Canton: Garonne-Lomagne-Brulhois
- Intercommunality: Deux Rives

Government
  - Mayor (2020–2026): Jean-Paul Terrenne
- Area^{1}: 13.17 km^{2} (5.08 sq mi)
- Elevation: 82 m (269 ft)
- Highest elevation: 163 m (535 ft)
- Lowest elevation: 47 m (154 ft)
- Population (2023): 1,042
  - Density: 79.12/km^{2} (204.9/sq mi)
- Time zone: UTC+01:00 (CET)
  - Summer (DST): UTC+02:00 (CEST)
- INSEE/Postal code: 82049 /82340
- ^{1} French Land Register data, which excludes lakes, ponds, glaciers > 1 km^{2} (0.386 sq mi or 247 acres) and river estuaries.

Donzac (French pronunciation: [dɔ̃zak]) is a commune in the Tarn-et-Garonne department in the Occitanie region in southern France.

== See also ==
- Communes of the Tarn-et-Garonne department
