= Belleperche Abbey =

Abbey in Tarn-et-Garonne, France

Coordinates: 43.9947°N 1.1258°E

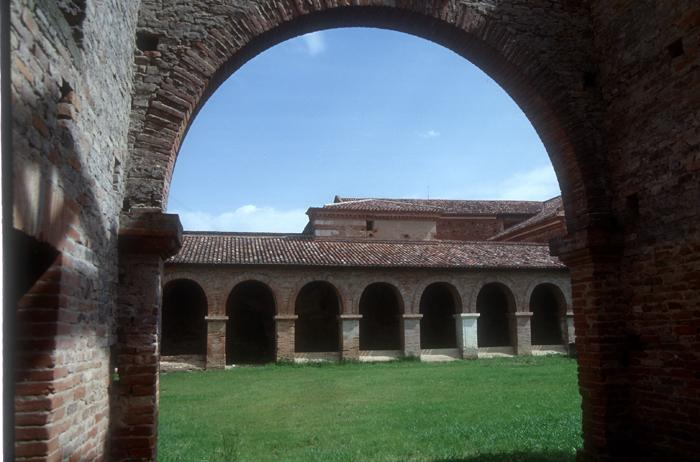
Cloister of the former abbey

Belleperche Abbey (bella pertica) is a former Cistercian abbey in Tarn-et-Garonne, Occitanie, in France, about 7 kilometres south of Castelsarrasin and 20 kilometres west of Montauban, situated on the Garonne.

== History ==
The monastery was founded between 1130 and 1140 by the d'Argombat family at a location about 10 kilometres from the later site. In 1143 it affiliated itself as a daughter house of the Cistercian primary Clairvaux Abbey. At this point it was transferred to an allod on the bank of the Garonne, where it carried out viniculture, horse-breeding, and cattle-breeding. Belleperche became one of the largest monasteries in southern France, with eight granges, including Angeville, and 60-80 monks in its heyday. The original building was already replaced by 1230 with a new construction on enlarged foundations on the riverbank. In 1563 a new Abbot's lodge was erected.

The abbey's decline began with the Hundred Years' War, and further damages were caused in 1572, during the Huguenot Wars. The monastery was restored (1604-1614), but was dissolved in 1791 as a result of the French Revolution. The abbey was converted into a castle, agricultural estates, and domestic residences, and unused buildings were demolished or fell into ruin.

A restoration was begun in 1993.

== Buildings and estates ==
The now demolished church was consecrated in 1263. It was 75 metres long and 20 wide, with polychromatic floor-tiles and an octagonal bell tower, modelled on Saint Sernin in Toulouse, above the crossing. The six bays of the chapter house were vaulted between 1250 and 1255. The rectangular cloister measured approximately 46 x 38 metres.

== Literature ==
- Jean-Michel Garric: Belleperche – au bord de la Garonne. In: Dossiers d'Archéologie. Nr. 234, 1998, ISSN 1141-7137, p. 14–15.
