= Lavit =

- Commune
- Coat of arms
- Location of Lavit
- Location within France Location within Occitanie
- Coordinates: 43°57′28″N 0°55′15″E
- Country: France
- Region: Occitania
- Department: Tarn-et-Garonne
- Arrondissement: Castelsarrasin
- Canton: Garonne-Lomagne-Brulhois
- Intercommunality: Lomagne tarn-et-garonnaise

Government
  - Mayor (2020–2026): Yves Meilhan
- Area^{1}: 26.28 km^{2} (10.15 sq mi)
- Elevation: 217 m (712 ft)
- Highest elevation: 245 m (804 ft)
- Lowest elevation: 116 m (381 ft)
- Population (2023): 1,579
  - Density: 60.08/km^{2} (155.6/sq mi)
- Time zone: UTC+01:00 (CET)
  - Summer (DST): UTC+02:00 (CEST)
- INSEE/Postal code: 82097 /82120
- ^{1} French Land Register data, which excludes lakes, ponds, glaciers > 1 km^{2} (0.386 sq mi or 247 acres) and river estuaries.

Lavit (French pronunciation: [lavi]; Occitan: La Vit) is a commune in the Tarn-et-Garonne department in the Occitanie region in southern France.

== See also ==
- Communes of the Tarn-et-Garonne department
