= Saint-Michel, Tarn-et-Garonne =

Saint-Michel
- Commune
- Location of Saint-Michel
- Location within France Location within Occitanie
- Coordinates: 44°02′02″N 0°56′45″E
- Country: France
- Region: Occitania
- Department: Tarn-et-Garonne
- Arrondissement: Castelsarrasin
- Canton: Garonne-Lomagne-Brulhois
- Intercommunality: Deux Rives

Government
  - Mayor (2020–2026): Joel Dupouy
- Area^{1}: 13.41 km^{2} (5.18 sq mi)
- Elevation: 150 m (490 ft)
- Highest elevation: 163 m (535 ft)
- Lowest elevation: 53 m (174 ft)
- Population (2023): 261
  - Density: 19.5/km^{2} (50.4/sq mi)
- Time zone: UTC+01:00 (CET)
  - Summer (DST): UTC+02:00 (CEST)
- INSEE/Postal code: 82166 /82340
- ^{1} French Land Register data, which excludes lakes, ponds, glaciers > 1 km^{2} (0.386 sq mi or 247 acres) and river estuaries.

Saint-Michel (French pronunciation: [sɛ̃ miʃɛl]; Occitan: Sent Miquèu) is a commune in the Tarn-et-Garonne department in the Occitanie region in southern France.

== See also ==
- Communes of the Tarn-et-Garonne department
