= Bardigues =

- Commune
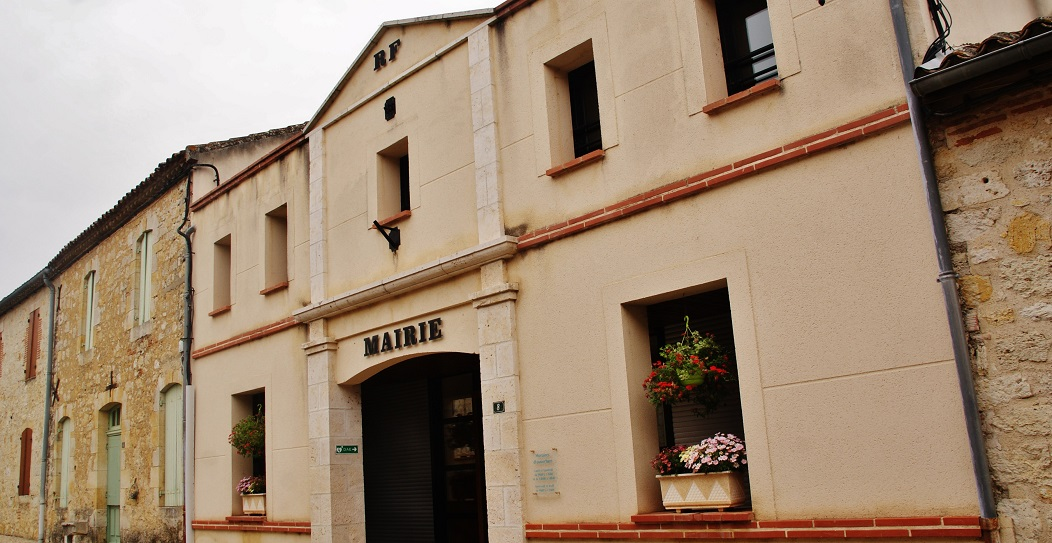
- Location of Bardigues
- Location within France Location within Occitanie
- Coordinates: 44°02′27″N 0°53′24″E
- Country: France
- Region: Occitania
- Department: Tarn-et-Garonne
- Arrondissement: Castelsarrasin
- Canton: Garonne-Lomagne-Brulhois
- Intercommunality: Deux Rives

Government
  - Mayor (2020–2026): Henri Martin
- Area^{1}: 11.67 km^{2} (4.51 sq mi)
- Elevation: 160 m (520 ft)
- Highest elevation: 185 m (607 ft)
- Lowest elevation: 77 m (253 ft)
- Population (2023): 235
  - Density: 20.1/km^{2} (52.2/sq mi)
- Time zone: UTC+01:00 (CET)
  - Summer (DST): UTC+02:00 (CEST)
- INSEE/Postal code: 82010 /82340
- ^{1} French Land Register data, which excludes lakes, ponds, glaciers > 1 km^{2} (0.386 sq mi or 247 acres) and river estuaries.

Bardigues (French pronunciation: [baʁdig]; Occitan: Bardigas) is a commune in the Tarn-et-Garonne department in the Occitanie region in southern France.

== See also ==
- Communes of the Tarn-et-Garonne department
