= Canton of Garonne-Lomagne-Brulhois =

Coordinates: 44.06°N 1.02°E

The canton of Garonne-Lomagne-Brulhois is an administrative division of the Tarn-et-Garonne department, in southern France. It was created at the French canton reorganisation which came into effect in March 2015. Its seat is in Saint-Nicolas-de-la-Grave.

It consists of the following communes:

1. Asques
2. Auvillar
3. Balignac
4. Bardigues
5. Castelmayran
6. Castéra-Bouzet
7. Caumont
8. Donzac
9. Dunes
10. Gensac
11. Gramont
12. Lachapelle
13. Lavit
14. Malause
15. Mansonville
16. Marsac
17. Maumusson
18. Merles
19. Montgaillard
20. Le Pin
21. Poupas
22. Puygaillard-de-Lomagne
23. Saint-Aignan
24. Saint-Cirice
25. Saint-Jean-du-Bouzet
26. Saint-Loup
27. Saint-Michel
28. Saint-Nicolas-de-la-Grave
29. Sistels
