= Canton of Castelsarrasin-2 =

Coordinates: 44°05′00″N 1°13′34″E

The Canton of Castelsarrasin-2 was one of the 12 cantons of the arrondissement of Castelsarrasin, in the Tarn-et-Garonne department, in southern France. It had 11,443 inhabitants (2012). It was disbanded following the French canton reorganisation which came into effect in March 2015.

The canton comprised the following communes:

- Albefeuille-Lagarde
- Barry-d'Islemade
- Les Barthes
- Castelsarrasin (partly)
- Labastide-du-Temple
- Meauzac
