= Le Temple =

Temple or Le Temple may refer to:

== Communes in France ==
- Temple-Laguyon, in the Dordogne department
- Le Temple, Gironde, in the Gironde department
- Le Temple, Loir-et-Cher, in the Loir-et-Cher department
- Le Temple-de-Bretagne, in the Loire-Atlantique department
- Le Temple-sur-Lot, in the Lot-et-Garonne department
- Conchil-le-Temple, in the Pas-de-Calais department
- Dampierre-au-Temple, in the Marne department
- Ivry-le-Temple, in the Oise department
- Labastide-du-Temple, in the Tarn-et-Garonne department
- La Forêt-du-Temple, in the Creuse department
- La Ville-Dieu-du-Temple, in the Tarn-et-Garonne department
- Prunay-le-Temple, in the Yvelines department
- Saint-Étienne-au-Temple, in the Marne department
- Saint-Hilaire-au-Temple, in the Marne department
- Savigny-le-Temple, in the Seine-et-Marne department

== Other ==
- The Temple (painting), a 1949 painting by Paul Delvaux
