= Castelsarrasin =

Commune in Occitanie region of France

Castelsarrasin Los Sarrasins (Occitan)
- Subprefecture and commune
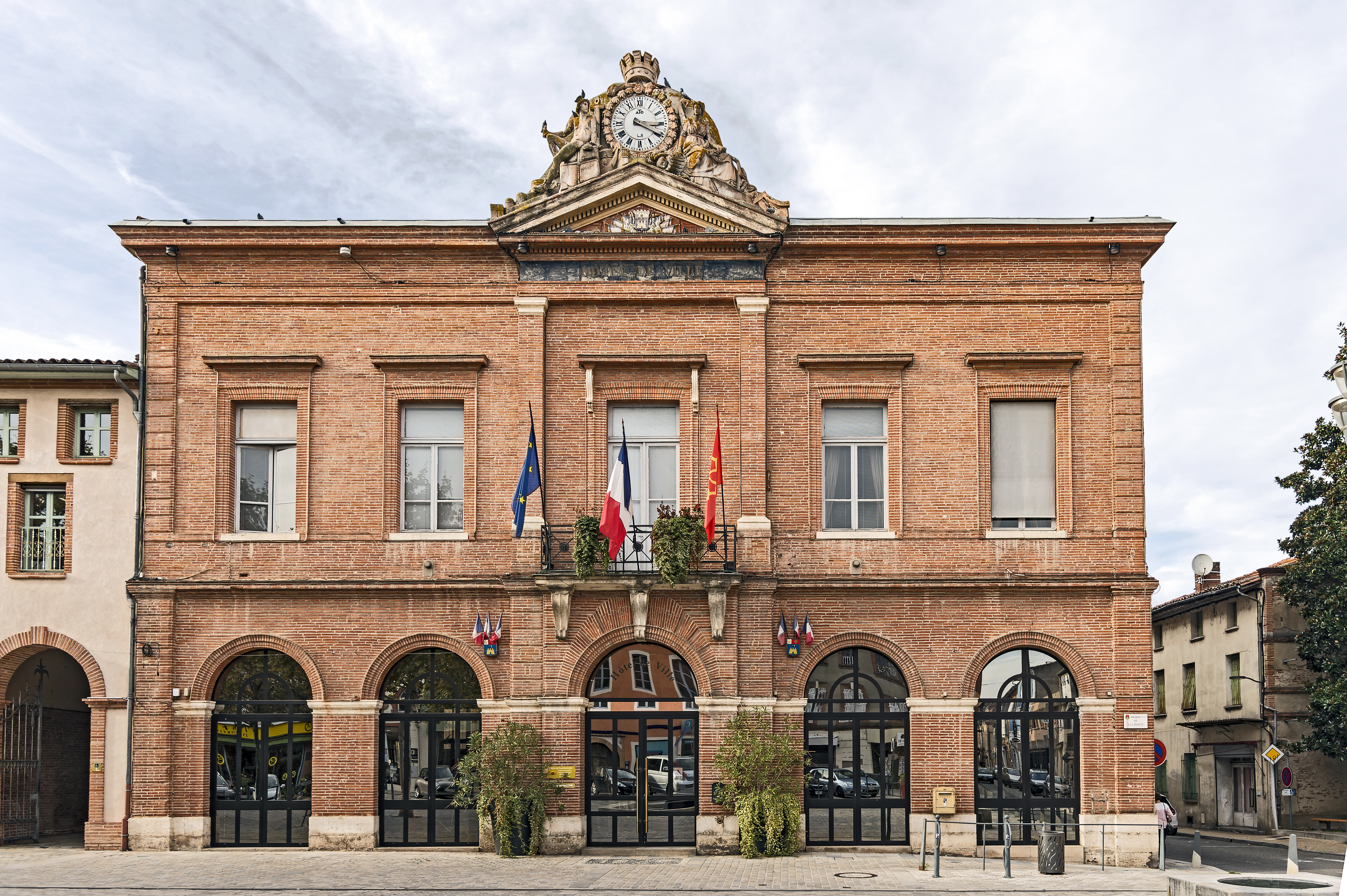
- Castelsarrasin town hall

- Coat of arms
- Location of Castelsarrasin
- Location within France Location within Occitanie
- Coordinates: 44°02′27″N 1°06′28″E
- Country: France
- Region: Occitania
- Department: Tarn-et-Garonne
- Arrondissement: Castelsarrasin
- Canton: Castelsarrasin
- Intercommunality: Terres des Confluences

Government
  - Mayor (2020–2026): Jean-Philippe Bésiers
- Area^{1}: 76.77 km^{2} (29.64 sq mi)
- Elevation: 84 m (276 ft)
- Highest elevation: 97 m (318 ft)
- Lowest elevation: 61 m (200 ft)
- Population (2023): 14,343
  - Density: 186.8/km^{2} (483.9/sq mi)
- Time zone: UTC+01:00 (CET)
  - Summer (DST): UTC+02:00 (CEST)
- INSEE/Postal code: 82033 /82100
- ^{1} French Land Register data, which excludes lakes, ponds, glaciers > 1 km^{2} (0.386 sq mi or 247 acres) and river estuaries.

Castelsarrasin (French pronunciation: [kastɛlsaʁazɛ̃]; Occitan: Los Sarrasins) is a commune in the Tarn-et-Garonne department in Occitanie region of France. The inhabitants are called Castelsarrasinois. It is the second most populous commune in Tarn-et-Garonne after Montauban. It is served by Castelsarrasin station on the Bordeaux-Toulouse line.

The town is also the seat of the Communauté de communes Terres des Confluences.

The Castelsarrasin urban area had 27,861 inhabitants in 2017, making it the 23rd largest urban area in the new Occitanie region. It is, respectively, the central city and the central commune of an urban unit and an area of influence. With a municipal population of 14,343 (2023), Castelsarrasin is the second largest town in the department by population, after Montauban and ahead of Moissac.

Castelsarrasin is located on a major transport route linking Bordeaux and the Atlantic Ocean to the northwest, and Narbonne and the Mediterranean Sea to the southeast, all via Toulouse. This important axis is notably marked by the A62 autoroute, which bypasses the city center to the northeast before reaching Castelsarrasin via an exit near the Artel industrial park. Like Agen's, Castelsarrasin's city center is unique in that it is bordered on both sides by the Garonne River and the Garonne Lateral Canal, which is part of the Canal des Deux Mers.

Although Castelsarrasin is not part of Toulouse's metropolitan area, it appears to be strongly influenced by this nearby conurbation of approximately 1.4 million inhabitants, as is the Tarn-et-Garonne department in general.

Most residents of the city and much of its surrounding area refer to it by the diminutive "Castel." Its inhabitants are called Castelsarrasinois.

== Geography ==
=== Location ===
The western part of the commune lies in the Garonne Valley, which is an alluvial plain. The unbuildable nature of the land in this area is the reason why this part of the commune is not very urbanized. The town center and other, much more urbanized areas are located at a slightly higher altitude on the eastern slope of the valley, which allows them to be sheltered from the river's floods.

=== Neighboring communes ===
Castelsarrasin borders eleven other communes. The neighboring communes are Les Barthes, Castelferrus, Castelmayran, Cordes-Tolosannes, Labastide-du-Temple, Moissac, Saint-Aignan, Saint-Nicolas-de-la-Grave, Saint-Porquier, and La Ville-Dieu-du-Temple.

=== Relief and geology ===
The area of the municipality is 7,677 hectares. Its altitude varies from 61 to 97 meters.

=== Hydrology ===
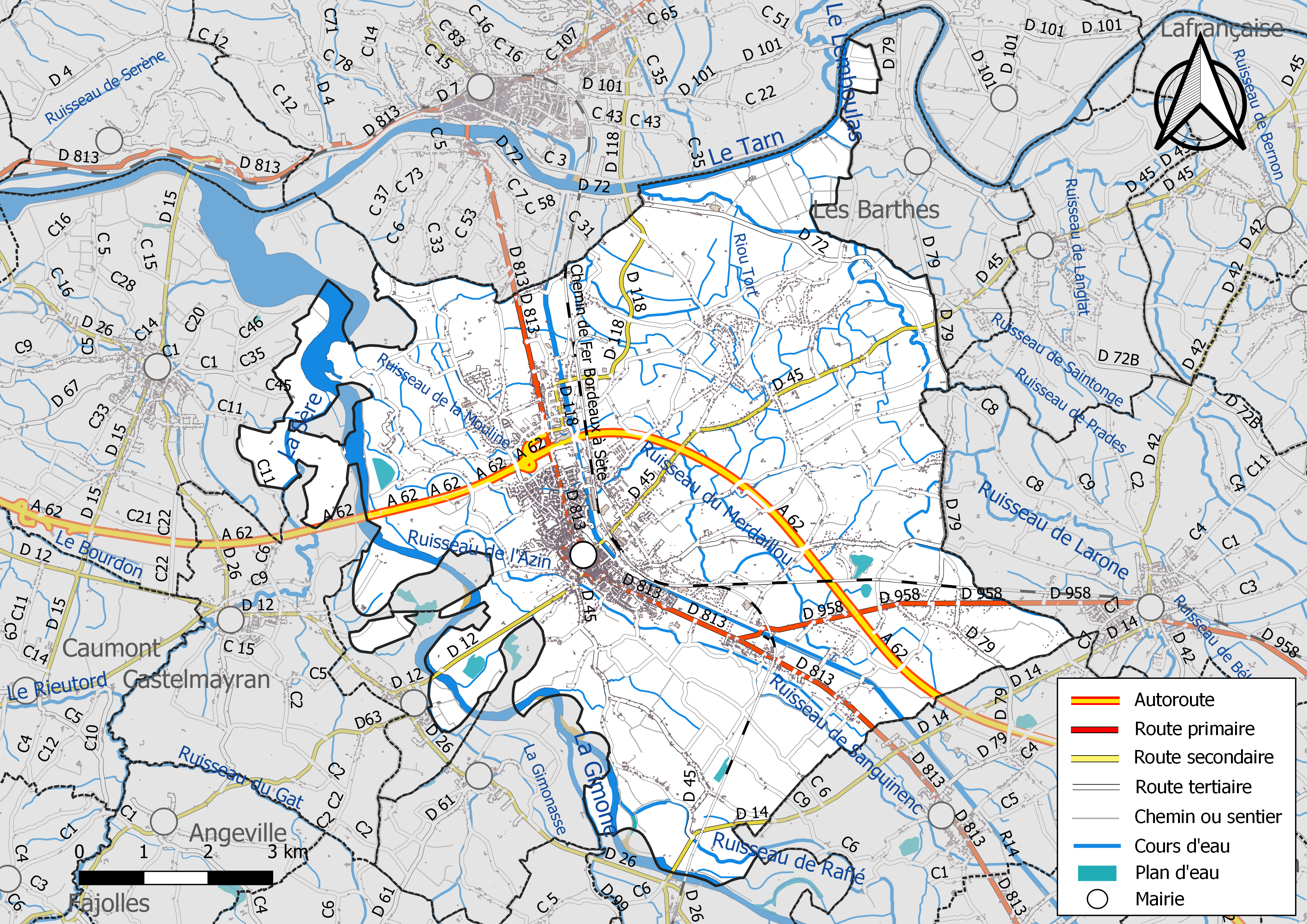
Hydrographic and road networks of Castelsarrasin.

The commune is located in the Garonne watershed, within the Adour-Garonne hydrographic basin.

It is drained by the Garonne, Gimone, Tarn, Lemboulas, Sère, Larone stream, Rafié stream, Bartac stream, Ravajole stream, Azin stream, Millole stream, Montagné stream, Saint-Michel stream, and a small stream, forming a hydrographic network with a total length of 147 km.

The Garonne is a mainly French river, originating in Spain, and flowing for 529 km before emptying into the Atlantic Ocean. It runs along the western flank of the commune.

The Gimone, with a total length of 136 km, rises in the commune of Saint-Loup-en-Comminges and flows from south to north. It crosses the commune and empties into the Garonne at Castelferrus, after passing through 54 communes.

The Tarn, with a total length of 380 km, rises in the commune of Pont-de-Montvert-Sud-Mont-Lozère and flows from east to west. It runs along the northern part of the commune and empties into the Garonne at Saint-Nicolas-de-la-Grave, after passing through 98 communes.

The Lemboulas, with a total length of 56.7 km, rises in the commune of Lalbenque and flows from northeast to southwest. It flows into the Tarn River, within the municipal boundaries, after crossing 15 municipalities.

The Sère River, with a total length of 31.8 km, rises in the municipality of Castéron and flows from southwest to northwest. It flows into the Garonne River, within the municipal boundaries, after crossing 15 municipalities.

The Larone Stream, with a total length of 23.6 km, rises in the municipality of Montech and flows from southeast to northwest. It flows into the Tarn River, within the municipal boundaries, after crossing 8 municipalities.

Finally, the Rafié Stream, with a total length of 15.5 km, rises in the municipality of Montech and flows from east to west. It flows into the Garonne in the municipal territory, after crossing 5 municipalities.

=== Climate ===
In 2010, the climate of the commune was of the Southwest Basin climate type, according to a study by the National Center for Scientific Research based on a series of data covering the period 1971–2000. In 2020, Météo-France published a typology of the climates of metropolitan France in which the commune is exposed to an altered oceanic climate and is in the Aquitaine, Gascony climatic region, characterized by abundant rainfall in spring, moderate in autumn, low sunshine in spring, a hot summer (19.5 °C), weak winds, frequent fog in autumn and winter and frequent thunderstorms in summer (15 to 20 days). For the period 1971–2000, the average annual temperature was 13.5 °C, with an annual thermal amplitude of 15.6 °C. The average annual cumulative precipitation is 747 mm, with 9.1 days of precipitation in January and 6 days in July. For the period 1991–2020, the average annual temperature observed at the meteorological station installed in the commune is 13.6 °C and the average annual cumulative precipitation is 698.6 mm. The maximum temperature recorded at this station is 43.1 °C, reached on August 24, 2023; the minimum temperature is −13.8 °C, reached on February 9, 2012.

The climate parameters of the commune have been estimated for the middle of the century (2041–2070) according to different greenhouse gas emission scenarios based on the new DRIAS-2020 reference climate projections. They can be viewed on a dedicated website published by Météo-France in November 2022.

== Urban planning ==
=== Typology ===
As of January 1, 2024, Castelsarrasin is categorized as a small town, according to the new seven-level communal density grid defined by INSEE in 2022. It belongs to the urban unit of Castelsarrasin, an intra-departmental agglomeration grouping together two communes, of which it is the city center. Furthermore, the commune is part of the Castelsarrasin attraction area, of which it is the central commune. This area, which includes communes, is categorized in areas with fewer than 50,000 inhabitants.

=== Land use ===
The land use of the commune, as shown in the European biophysical land use database Corine Land Cover (CLC), is marked by the importance of agricultural territories (80.3% in 2018), a decrease compared to 1990 (86.2%). The detailed breakdown in 2018 is as follows: arable land (50.1%), heterogeneous agricultural areas (18.8%), urbanized areas (10.4%), permanent crops (9.8%), industrial or commercial areas and communication networks (3.3%), inland waters (2.9%), forests (2.8%), meadows (1.6%), environments with shrub and/or herbaceous vegetation (0.3%). The evolution of the land use of the commune and its infrastructures can be observed on the different cartographic representations of the territory: the Cassini map (18th century), the general staff map (1820–1866) and the IGN maps or aerial photos for the current period (1950 to today).

==== Roads ====
The main roads serving the city are the A62 motorway via exit 9 "Castelsarrasin", and the former national road 113, which became departmental road 813 following the downgrading of national roads in 2005. Most existing secondary roads converge on the city center.

A circular boulevard runs around the city center. The unique feature of this boulevard is that it is almost entirely one-way. This can sometimes complicate travel between certain areas of the city.

==== Public transport ====
The city is crossed by the Bordeaux–Sète railway. Trains use it and serve Castelsarrasin station. The Bordeaux-Toulouse high-speed line will cross the southern end of Castelsarrasin, through the residential neighborhoods of Bénis and Saint Martin Belcassé.

A regional bus network line connects Montauban to Castelsarrasin with 37 daily round trips.

The town is served by the Castelsarrasin public transport network, La Tulipe, which has two lines, including a circular line divided into two (even and odd directions).

==== Canal of Garonne ====
The Canal de Garonne, which is part of the Canal latéral à la Garonne, crosses the city from north to south. It is an essential element of tourism, due to the large number of boaters who use it, the greenway used by walkers of all kinds, and the attraction of the Port Jacques-Yves-Cousteau.

==== Air transport ====
Castelsarrasin airport is located in the northeastern part of the city, in the Gandalou district. Its primary purpose is aerial leisure.

=== Major risks ===
The territory of the commune of Castelsarrasin is vulnerable to various natural hazards: meteorological (storms, thunderstorms, snow, extreme cold, heatwave or drought), floods, ground movements and earthquakes (very low seismicity). It is also exposed to three technological risks, the transport of dangerous materials and industrial risk and nuclear risk. A site published by the BRGM allows you to simply and quickly assess the risks of a property located either by its address or by the number of its plot.

==== Natural risks ====
The commune is part of the Montauban-Moissac high flood risk area (TRI), which includes 15 communes at risk of the Tarn overflowing, one of the 18 TRIs that were closed at the end of 2012 in the Adour-Garonne basin. The historic flood of March 1930 caused considerable damage. The disaster left 210 dead and nearly 10,000 homeless. 120 deaths were recorded in the town of Moissac alone after the dikes broke and 2,769 houses were destroyed in Tarn-et-Garonne. Floodplain maps have been established for three scenarios: frequent (flood with a return time of 10 to 30 years), medium (return time of 100 to 300 years), and extreme (return time of around 1,000 years, which would render any protection system ineffective). The commune has been declared a natural disaster site due to damage caused by floods and mudslides in 1988, 1994, 1996, 1999, 2000, 2005, 2006, 2018, and 2022.

Castelsarrasin is exposed to the risk of forest fires. However, as the Tarn-et-Garonne department generally presents a very localized medium to low hazard level, no Departmental Plan for the Protection of Forests Against Forest Fire Risk (PFCIF) has been developed. Clearing brush around houses is one of the best protections for individuals against fire.

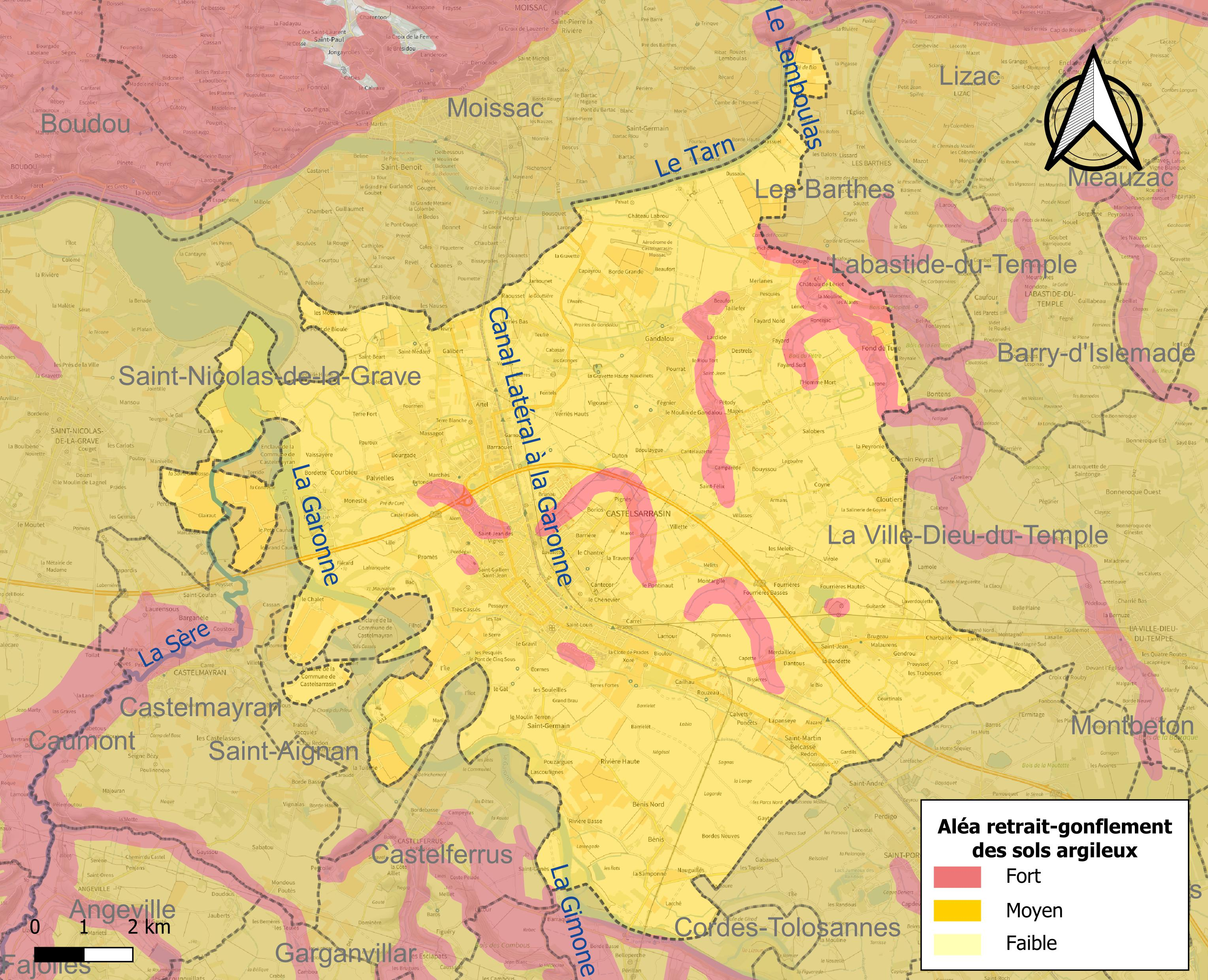
Map of the shrinkage-swelling hazard zones of the clay soils of Castelsarrasin

The ground movements likely to occur in the commune are differential settlements.

The shrinkage-swelling of clay soils is likely to cause significant damage to buildings in the event of alternating periods of drought and rain. The entire commune is at medium or high risk (92% at the departmental level and 48.5% at the national level). Of the 4,723 buildings counted in the commune in 2019, 4,723 are at medium or high risk, i.e. 100%, compared to 96% at the departmental level and 54% at the national level. A map of the exposure of the national territory to the shrinkage-swelling of clay soils is available on the BRGM website.

Furthermore, in order to better understand the risk of land subsidence, the national inventory of underground cavities makes it possible to locate those located in the commune.

==== Technological risks ====
The commune is exposed to industrial risk due to the presence on its territory of a company subject to the European SEVESO directive.

The risk of transporting hazardous materials within the commune is linked to its crossing by major road or rail infrastructure or the presence of a hydrocarbon transport pipeline. An accident occurring on such infrastructure is likely to have serious effects on property, people, or the environment, depending on the nature of the material transported. Urban planning provisions may be recommended accordingly.

In the event of a serious accident, certain nuclear facilities are likely to release radioactive iodine into the atmosphere. As the commune is located within the 20 km safety perimeter around the Golfech Nuclear Power Plant, it is exposed to nuclear risk. In the event of a nuclear accident, an alert is issued by various media (siren, text messages, radio, vehicles). As soon as the alert is issued, people living within the 2 km perimeter seek shelter. People living within a 20 km perimeter may be required, on the orders of the prefect, to evacuate and ingest iodine tablets.

== Etymology ==
The official French name of the commune is Castelsarrasin (French pronunciation: [kastɛlsaʁazɛ̃]), sometimes spelled Castelsarrazin. This is a Frenchification of the original Occitan name Castèlsarrasin, more commonly Los Sarrasins. During the French Revolution, the official name of the town was briefly Mont-Sarrazin.

The name of the locality is attested in the form Castrum Cerrucium in the 9th century, then Castro Sarreceno in 1156.

This is a medieval toponymic formation Castèl-, an Occitan cognate of the French "château" (cf. Castelnau). The second element -sarrasin is the altered form of *Cerrucinum, the ancient name of the locality reused in the new medieval formation Castèl-. This is a common technique in toponymy; for example, Castel-Roussillon (Pyrénées-Orientales, Ruscino in the 1st century) is constructed according to the same principle.

Albert Dauzat considers that the initial place name is of the type *Cerrucinum, that is, *Cerrucius, a conjectural Latin anthroponym, based on the well-attested personal name Cerius, followed by the suffix -inum, common in toponymy and which gave rise to the ending -in in most cases. *Cerrucin was reinterpreted as Sarracin, then Sarrasin by paronymic attraction of the well-known word, with which it is, however, unrelated. There is a homonym Castel-Sarrazin in Landes.

Updated March 1, 2024:

According to P.-H. Billy, the identification made by A. Dauzat between the castrum quod Cerrucium vocatur attested in 847 and Castelsarrasin is erroneous. The town is attested only in the 12th century, in 1137 Castelli Sarraceni then Castro Sarraceno in 1156. The Latin castellum (which appears in the name of 1137), diminutive of castrum (used in 1156), designated, during the early Middle Ages, any fortification erected for military or protective purposes (of an abbey, a town ...) then, from the year 1000, a fortified town. Here, it is a seigneurial castle established by the counts of Toulouse and whose name would be linked to a person, Ramondus Sarracenus. Linked to the count's family through his wife, the latter would have been responsible for setting up, in addition to the sauvetés (urban foundations around the asylum of a church) of Montech in 1134 and of Montauban in 1144, the castelnau (urban foundation around the castle) which took his name. The Occitan form Castel Sarrazi appears in 1162, while the current French form appears to have appeared only in the mid-18th century and does not appear in official nomenclatures until 1818.

=== Gandalou / Gandalor ===
There is a hamlet in the commune called Gandalou (Occitan: Gandalor, Occitan pronunciation: [gan.da.ˈlu]), the site of a fortification attested in 961 in a Latin phrase Castello quod vocant Vuandalors, which, however, directly refers to a foreign people, that is, "(farm of the) Vandals," in the genitive plural.

== History ==
The city's early history was marked by wars: against the Aquitanians until the end of the 12th century, then the Albigensian Crusade during the first half of the 13th century. During this period, the city was administered by consuls and received its first customs (legal texts governing the city) in 1230.

In the 14th century, religious intolerance continued to wreak havoc, and in 1320, during the Second Crusade of the Shepherds, thousands of Jews were killed in the region, including 160 in Castelsarrasin alone.

As early as 1337, the Garonne Gate had been walled off and the tower on Avenue de Moissac plastered over.

During the 14th and 15th centuries, floods, plague, and especially the Hundred Years' War ravaged the region, which experienced only a few decades of calm at the beginning of the 16th century.

For, as early as 1560, the Wars of Religion began, during which Catholic Castelsarrasin was at odds with the rest of the region, which was largely Protestant. The Saint-Sauveur Church is one of the few in the area to have escaped destruction.

At the end of the 17th century, Antoine Laumet, known as Lamothe Cadillac, was born in Saint-Nicolas-de-la-Grave, not far from Castelsarrasin. Sent by the King of France to the Americas, he founded the city of Detroit there and was then appointed governor of Louisiana in 1710. As a sign of gratitude, Detroit gave its name to the famous automobile brand, and "Cadillac Encounters" are held every two years in Castelsarrasin.

Returning to France, he became governor of Castelsarrasin on February 11, 1723, and died there a few years later, in October 1730.

The following centuries, until the Revolution of 1789, were calmer. In Castelsarrasin, as throughout France, the late 18th century was a turbulent time, with the establishment of the Republic and then the First Empire.

From 1790 to 1795, Castelsarrasin was the capital of the Castelsarrasin district, formerly located in Haute-Garonne.

From 1850, the town, which had a population of 7,000, began to grow and expand, particularly thanks to the arrival of the railway and then the "Usine" (a railway station). Similarly, in 1875, a barracks was built; the town still has its own regiment today, which contributes greatly to its vitality.

In the spring of 1944, part of the 4th SS Regiment "Der Führer" of the "Das Reich" Division was stationed there, before being called to Normandy and committing numerous atrocities and massacres en route, including the massacre at Oradour-sur-Glane.

In the 20th century, despite the terrible bloodletting of the two wars, the town continued to expand to the present day, where it has established itself as the second largest economic center in Tarn-et-Garonne.

In May 1968, the sub-prefecture of Tarn-et-Garonne was, after Montauban, the second largest city in which strikes spread. "Contrary to what one might have thought, the Cégédur-Péchiney factory, with its thousand metalworkers, would not be the spearhead of the demonstrations of May 68 in Castelsarrasin, and it was even less the CGT, the most powerful union within the factory, which was the instigator". It was indeed the high school students, helped by their supervisors, many of whom were members of the PSU, who launched the movement. In this department, which was at the time essentially agricultural, the farmers would not be left out. The communist union leader, Paul Ardouin, who had trained with Renaud Jean, managed to mobilize several hundred small farmers.

Castelsarrasin was the finish of Stage 17 in the 2007 Tour de France.

== Politics and administration ==
Castelsarrasin is a subprefecture of the department.

=== Municipal administration ===
The number of inhabitants in the 2017 census being between 10,000 inhabitants and 19,999 inhabitants in the last census, the number of members of the municipal council is thirty-three.

=== Political trends and results ===
From a political perspective, the city is difficult to pinpoint. Since 1985, no member of a political party has been elected mayor of the city.

Nevertheless, the 2017 French presidential election revealed a trend in favor of the National Front. The far-right party achieved significant results, ranging from 31.85% in the first round to 48.51% in the second round. This trend appears to be almost universal in most municipalities along the Garonne River, from the south of Tarn-et-Garonne to the Gironde estuary.

Regarding these presidential elections in the municipality, despite Emmanuel Macron's lower score in the first round (20.03%), he won with 51.49% of the vote in the second round. The trend therefore remains uncertain.

=== Administrative, judicial and military authorities ===
Castelsarrasin is the sub-prefecture of Tarn-et-Garonne. A building located at 44 rue de la Fraternité houses the responsibilities assigned to it by the administration. Since March 9, 2020, the sub-prefect has been Sarah Ghobadi. Myriam Garcia, who served in Castelsarrasin from 2012 to 2014, was the first female district sub-prefect in French history.

The city is the headquarters of the Terres des Confluences Community of Communes, a key player in the city's economic development. This has allowed it to gain greater influence over the surrounding areas, with over 40,000 residents across the entire inter-municipality. The name "Terres des Confluences" is new. It was created on January 1, 2017, from the merger of the "Terre de Confluences" and "Sère-Garonne-Gimone" communities of communes. Before 2014, it was called the "Castelsarrasin-Moissac Community of Communes" and was limited to these two municipalities.

The city is home to a local court. This court, which falls under the jurisdiction of the Toulouse Court of Appeal, has been under the jurisdiction of the Montauban judicial court since the entry into force of the 2018-2022 programming and reform law for justice, and its territorial jurisdiction corresponds to the Castelsarrasin district. The court, like the sub-prefecture, is located on Rue de la Fraternité.

A national police station, a national gendarmerie brigade, and a section of public highway surveillance officers cover Castelsarrasin and its surrounding areas.

Finally, since 1971, the town has been the garrison of the 31st Engineer Regiment (RG) of the French Army.

Previously, between 1949 and 1971, the 17th Airborne Engineer Battalion (RGAP) was stationed at the Banel Barracks (which became a regiment in 1963). The 17th Parachute Engineer Regiment (RGP) is now located in Montauban. Until 2015, the Banel Barracks was used as an annex of the 31st Engineer Regiment (RG). The barracks buildings were returned to the municipality, which now owns them.

== Population and society ==
=== Demographics ===
Historical population
Year	Pop.	±% p.a.
1968	11,318	—
1975	10,752	−0.73%
1982	10,924	+0.23%
1990	11,317	+0.44%
1999	11,352	+0.03%
2007	12,862	+1.57%
2012	13,295	+0.66%
2017	13,944	+0.96%
2023	14,343	+0.47%
Source: INSEE

=== Education ===
Castelsarrasin is part of the Toulouse academy.

Education plays a major role in the city.

Jean-de-Prades General and Technological High School (plus post-baccalaureate with a BTS in SME-SMI Management Assistant). Jean-de-Prades Vocational High School. Jean-de-Prades Middle School. Pierre-Flamens Middle School. Eight primary schools and seven nursery schools, including two school groups in outlying neighborhoods.

=== Health ===
The town has the Castelsarrasin-Moissac intercommunal hospital, for medium and long-term care, palliative care, and a retirement home. The emergency department of this same hospital is located in the neighboring town of Moissac.

=== Social ===
==== Associations ====
The municipality includes approximately 110 active associations within its territory, particularly in the fields of sports, culture, and social activities.

The Red Cross established a committee there in 1942. Since October 2020, its headquarters have been located at 40 bis Route de Toulouse.

=== Cultural events and festivities ===
From 2015 to 2016, the city hosted the Alors.. CHANTE! Festival, initially based in Montauban. At the end of 2016, the association that manages this festival filed for bankruptcy. Another association was created with new partners to create a new festival, which will begin in May 2017, under the name Festival Grain de sel.

The city hosted the 17th stage of the 2007 Tour de France as well as two Tour de France stage starts in 2001 and 2004, and a stopover on July 20, 2012.

=== Sports ===
Sporting activities in the city are quite diverse and numerous.

The Cercle Athlétique Castelsarrasinois, a rugby union club, competes in the French first division federal championship. They wear red and white. The city hosted the Fiji national team's training sessions during the 2007 Rugby Union World Cup. The club plays its matches at the Adrien-Alary Stadium.

For football, there are two clubs: the Gandalou Football Club (GFC), located in the Gandalou district, which competes in the first district division, and the Entente Football Castel-Moissac, which competes in the promotion d'honneur.

The CAC Cycling Club, a century-old club, is one of the largest cycling clubs in France.

Other activities include tennis, basketball, handball, athletics, and more. In addition, various gym and fitness franchises have opened in recent years, particularly in the Terre Blanche commercial area.

The city has an airfield in the Gandalou district. Amateur aeronautics are practiced there. Furthermore, this airfield is intended to become a commercial airport for low-cost medium-haul flights in the future.

=== Cults ===
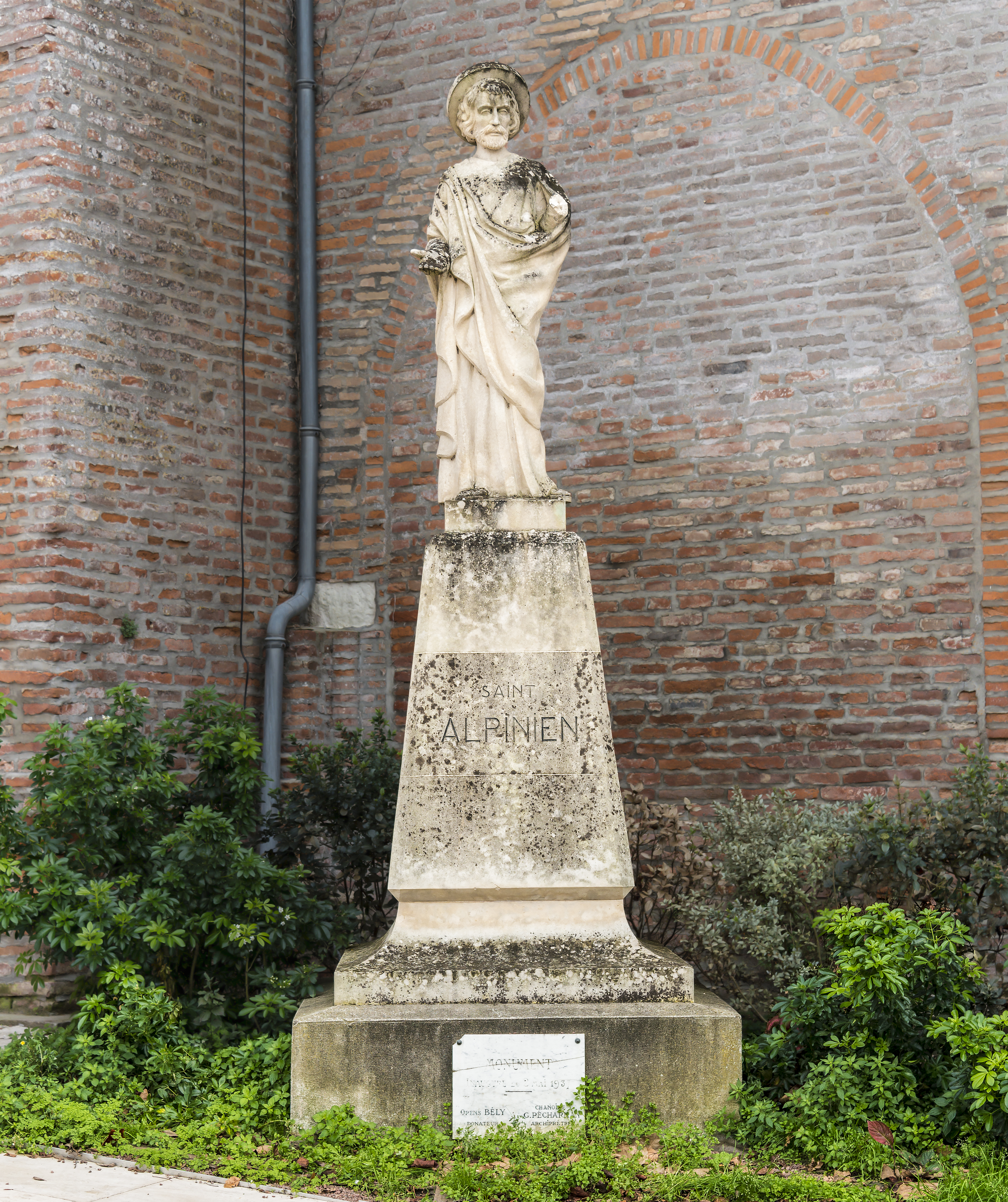
Saint Alpinien

The main religious denominations have dedicated places throughout the city. The Church of Saint-Sauveur is the main place of worship for Catholics. There is also a mosque for Muslims and a dedicated place of worship for the Evangelical Church.

- Saint Alpinien is the city's patron saint for the Catholic Church; a monument is erected along the north facade of the Church of Saint-Sauveur.

== Economy ==
=== Industry ===
The Castelsarrasin factory was a mint in 1914 and from 1943 to 1946. The coins minted there are marked with a "C" above the date. In 1914, a makeshift mint was created in the South of France in anticipation of a possible siege of Paris. A French metals factory, the company was acquired by the Cégédur group, then Péchiney. At that time, in the early 1970s, the company lost the majority of its workforce at the start of the French metallurgy crisis. In the late 1990s, the Castelsarrasin unit was acquired by the multinational Alcan, and in 2005, by the Rio Tinto group. Another part of the factory was taken over by the Alcoa group.

The lava and enameled quartz plant (Pyrolave), which employs over a hundred people, is a world leader in the use of lava and second in quartz mining. Initially a family business, the company was acquired in June 2008 by the Finalp group, which owns Mobalpa while remaining on the Castelsarrasin site.

The municipality has two sites at either end of its perimeter classified as "Seveso 2 high threshold," the highest level since the AZF accident in Toulouse. On the northern outskirts of Castelsarrasin, towards Moissac, the site of the Butagaz gas depot company, in the Barrès 2 zone, raises many questions with the future implementation of the Technological Risk Prevention Plan (PPRT), which risks reducing the economic development of this ZAC. Since September 2009, the inter-municipal zone has been at the heart of a legal imbroglio initiated by Deputy Prefect Patrick Cousinard, who denounced the Delrieu company's building permits. At the same time, this has provoked considerable discontent among local residents, who have had to undertake major work to make their homes safe.

On the other side of town, the Army's fuel supply and storage site is also affected by the same danger.

Since the beginning of the 21st century, the northern end of the town has continued to develop. The town's mayor, Bernard Dagen, has repeatedly expressed his strong desire to see the development of "a Castelsarrasin business district," as he puts it. After the relatively large-scale establishment of large retail chains, this area is preparing to welcome the construction of a large multiplex cinema in the Terre Blanche district. This will lead to expropriations.

On the rail front, the town has a freight connection with Beaumont-de-Lomagne, via the Castelsarrasin to Beaumont-de-Lomagne line. Formerly used for passenger transport, the line is now used only for the transport of grain and gasoline for the military supply and storage zone of the Army's fuel service.

=== Employment and education level ===
In the municipality, the unemployment rate for those aged 15 to 64, as defined by the census, was 10.4% in 2008 and 10.8% in 2013. In 2018, this rate was 12.3%. It is therefore increasing. The unemployment rate for those aged 15 to 24 is 26.3%.

As in most peri-urban areas, the main socio-professional categories present in the municipality are employees, manual workers, and intermediate occupations.

In 2018, 39% of the municipality's 15- to 64-year-olds had at least a high school diploma, 23% had at least a university degree, and 10.6% had at least a high school diploma.

36.5% of the population had no diploma.

=== Economic and commercial activity zones ===
Over the past fifteen years, the city has experienced a particularly significant growth in its economic and commercial activities, due to the sudden emergence in the 1990s of commercial activity zones, particularly in the north of the municipality. The ZAC du Barraouet, de l'Artel, de Fleury, and more recently Terre Blanche are emblematic examples. To date, the trend is towards an exponential acceleration of this development, particularly with the ambitious projects concerning the ZAC de Terre Blanche, even though a judgment of the Toulouse administrative court dated March 2015 annulled the declaration of public utility of the zone. As is the case in the vast majority of municipalities experiencing this type of "peripheral" economic development, Castelsarrasin has experienced a commercial slowdown in its hyper-city center in recent years.

=== Gastronomy ===
The Castelsarrasin fat market remains one of the most renowned in the Midi-Pyrénées region, after those of the neighboring Gers. It is under the Occitan market hall that this weekly market takes place from November to April, where producers and breeders from all over the department come to sell their ducks, geese, turkeys and other fattened poultry. Despite the great efforts of the commune to maintain the tradition of fattening competitions and markets, this production, which "however does not know the crisis", is in danger of disappearing.

=== Infrastructure ===
A large community hall, the Jean-Moulin Hall, can host various large-scale events. Another hall, the Paul-Descazeaux Hall, can accommodate smaller events.

The Adrien-Alary Stadium (approximately 2,500 seats) is home to the town's rugby union club, and occasionally hosts matches for one of the two football clubs. It is part of a complex including a gymnasium, two fields, and a swimming pool.

The Canal du Midi crosses the town from north to south. Near the town center, the Jean-Yves-Cousteau Port provides ample parking for boaters. In 2015, a river technical center was built near the port. A creation by Dutch artist Ruudt Wackers was installed on this site. A sculpture depicting a rusty steel ship with a continuous jet of water projecting onto it has been much talked about and continues to intrigue passersby.

The city has had an airfield in the Gandalou district (Castelsarrasin-Moissac airfield) since June 22, 1935. "This airfield is at the center of a study project aimed at transforming it into an airport in the medium term that could accommodate low-cost flights and business jets." This project will require significant investment over nearly a decade. In the meantime, the study commissioned by the Castelsarrasin-Moissac community of communes recommends that the inter-municipal authority take over the site.

=== Telecommunications ===
Castelsarrasin has acquired a twenty-kilometer-long fiber optic loop for a budget of 1.6 million euros. This is the longest fiber optic line in Tarn-et-Garonne.

== Personalities ==
- Antoine de la Mothe Cadillac, explorer and mayor, died in 1730.
- Charles de Mazade, born in 1820.
- Pierre Perret, singer born on 9 July 1934.
- Caroline Costa, singer born in 1996

== Culture and sights ==
The city has a significant heritage that contributes to its tourist appeal.

=== Places and monuments ===
- Chapel of Compassion at the Castelsarrasin Convent.
- Chapel of the Castelsarrasin Hospital.
- Church of the Visitation in Gandalou. The building is listed in the Mérimée database and the General Inventory of the Occitanie Region. Several items are listed in the Palissy database.
- Church of the Carmelite Convent in Castelsarrasin.
- Church of Saint Martin in Saint-Martin-Belcassé. The building is listed in the Mérimée database and the General Inventory of the Occitanie Region.
- Orthodox Chapel of Saint Nicholas in Ohrid.

==== Saint-Sauveur Church ====
The Saint-Sauveur church is located on Place de la Raison. The building was listed as a historical monument in 2002. Several items are referenced in the Palissy database.

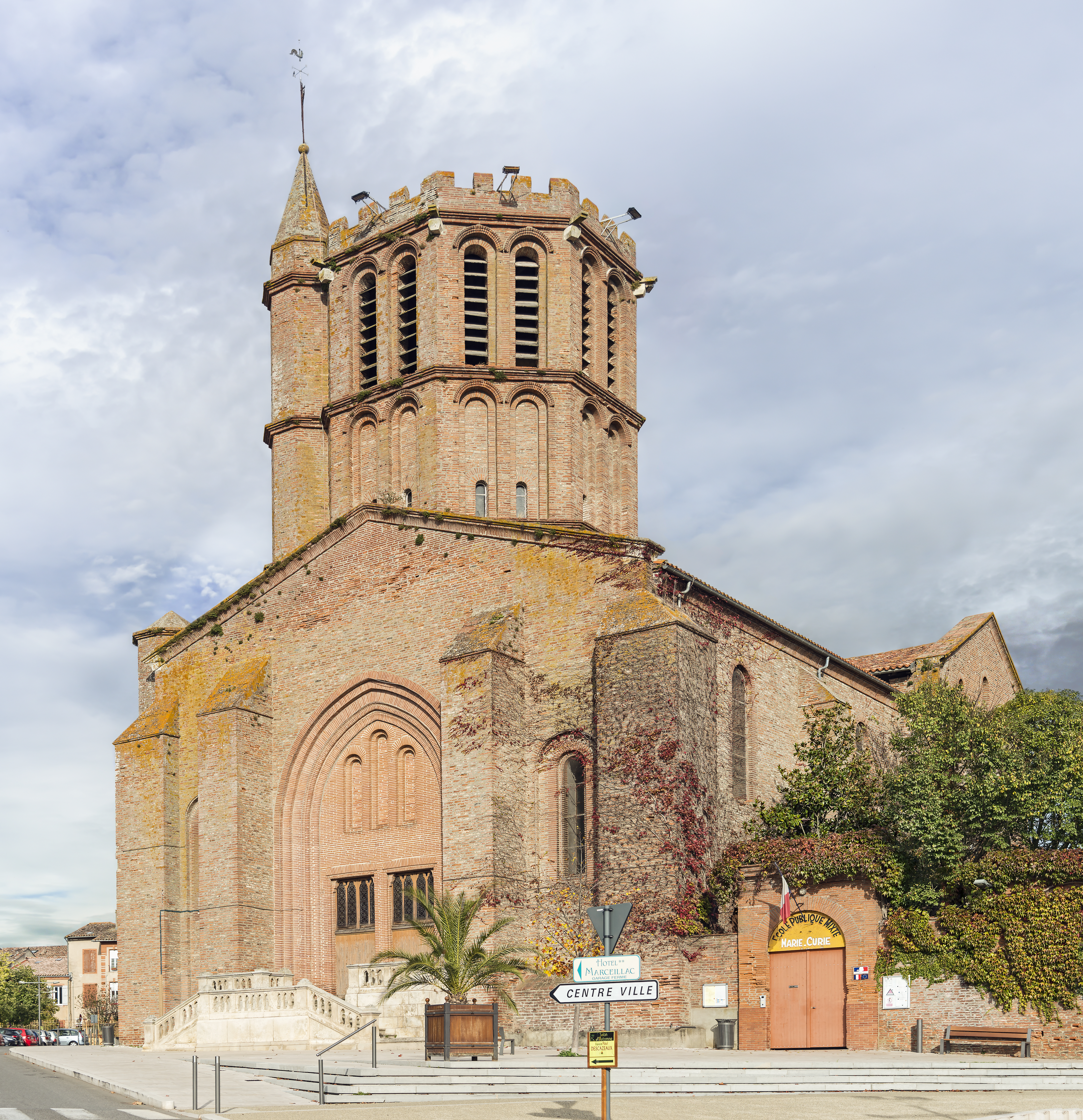
Saint-Sauveur Church

First mentioned in 961, the Church of Saint-Sauveur was rebuilt in 1254, "in a sumptuous manner." Until 1626, it served as a priory of Moissac Abbey and remained the most important church in the Diocese of Bas-Montauban until the French Revolution of 1789.

It is built entirely of brick, a prime example of early Gothic architecture, with a nave and transept vaulted with pointed arches and side aisles covered by Romanesque pointed barrel vaults.

It features the following characteristics:

- An octagonal bell tower with two stories separated by an exterior stringcourse; 32 twin, round-arched windows;
- A 17th- and 18th-century furnishings listed as a historical monument. It comprises splendid woodwork, mostly from the former Belleperche Abbey, acquired in January 1799, and marble altars and angels;
- A stained-glass windows signed and dated by Joseph Villiet, Louis Gesta, and Henri Feur;
- a display case presenting various religious objects behind the high altar. Since the 13th century, the church has housed the relics of the town's patron saint, Saint Alpinien, companion of Saint Martial, evangelizers of the Gallic province of Aquitaine;
- A woodwork from Belleperche Abbey, acquired in January 1799, including:
  - An organ case (18th century) whose theme is musical instruction, listed as a historical monument;
  - A 17th-century choir stalls. The chancel now houses only 39 of the original 80;
  - A door (18th century) likely depicting members of the Arcombald family, founders and benefactors of Belleperche Abbey;
  - the pulpit (17th and 18th centuries);
  - the prie-dieux (18th century);
  - the sacristy door (17th century) featuring the apostles Peter and Paul sculpted in relief in a truly masterful manner.
- Marble:
  - the high altar (18th century) entirely in polychrome marble;
  - the adoring angels (18th century) carved from pure white marble;
  - the altar of the Saint-Alpinien chapel (18th century) composed of polychrome marble;
  - the holy water fonts (17th and 18th centuries) almost certainly come from Belleperche.

Other furnishings:

- a statue of the Virgin and Child in carved wood, late 15th - early 16th century;
- a polychrome wooden statue (18th century);
- a gilded wooden reliquary (19th century) containing the relics of Saint Alpinien;
- a gilded wooden pavilion (18th century).

==== Saint-Jean Church ====
It is located at the northern end of Rue Paul-Descazeaux.

The Knights of St. John of Jerusalem were present in the surrounding countryside as early as the 12th century (Saint-Jean-des-Vignes church). Mentioned in the town as early as 1216, the church was partially rebuilt in 1515.

- Built of brick, with a heavy architectural style and low ribbed vaults.
- The two-story bell tower features two round-arched windows on each side, and the second story is surmounted by a hexagonal spire with ribs and faces pierced by small Maltese cross-shaped openings.
- Stained glass windows by Louis Victor Gesta of Toulouse.
- The interior decoration was completed in 1924 by the Tarn-et-Garonne painter Gaillard-Lala. It includes interesting coats of arms of local figures.
- To the northwest of the church is a sculpture by Casimir Ferrer, entitled "The Pilgrim."

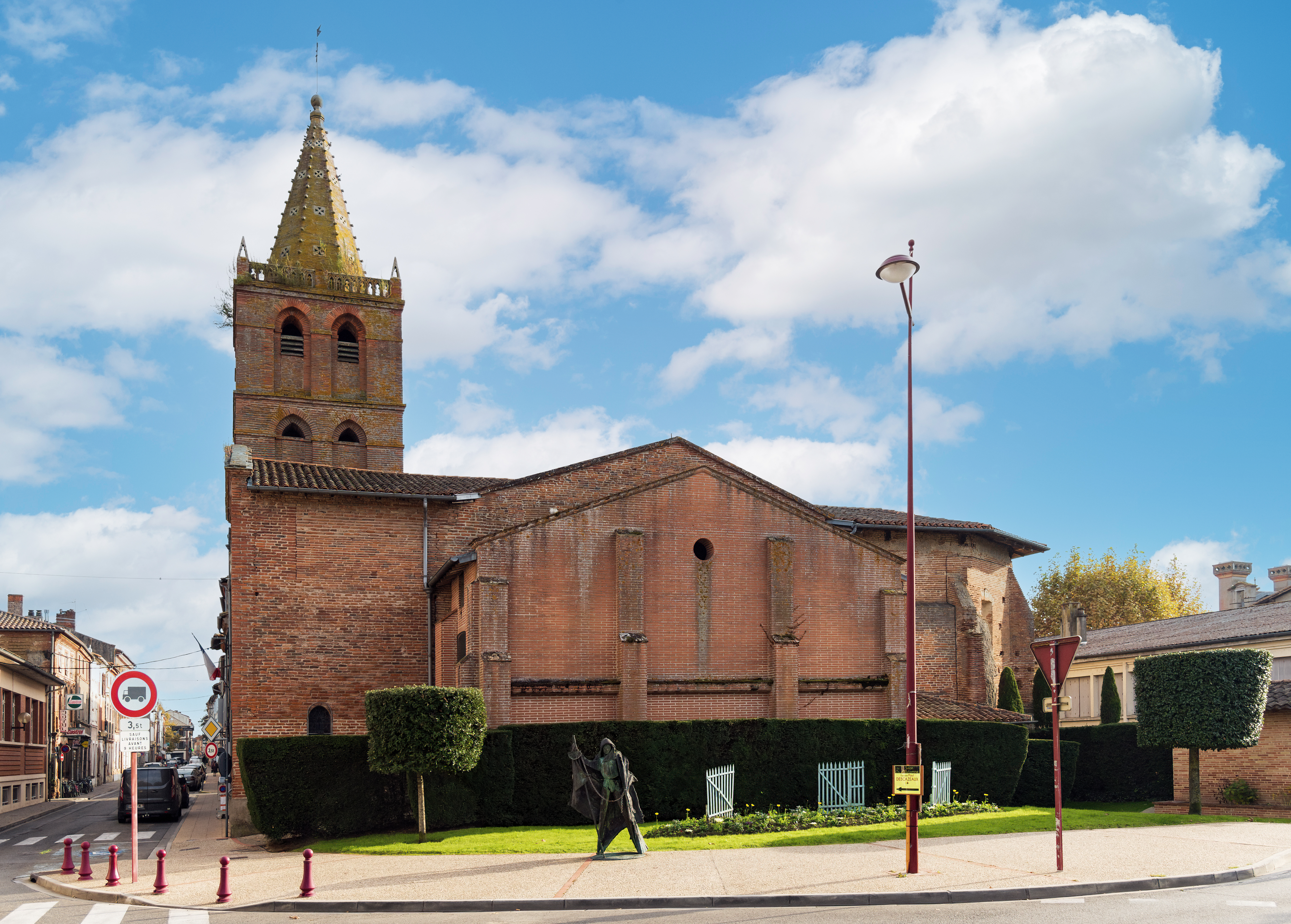
Saint John's Church with the sculpture The Pilgrim by Casimir Ferrer

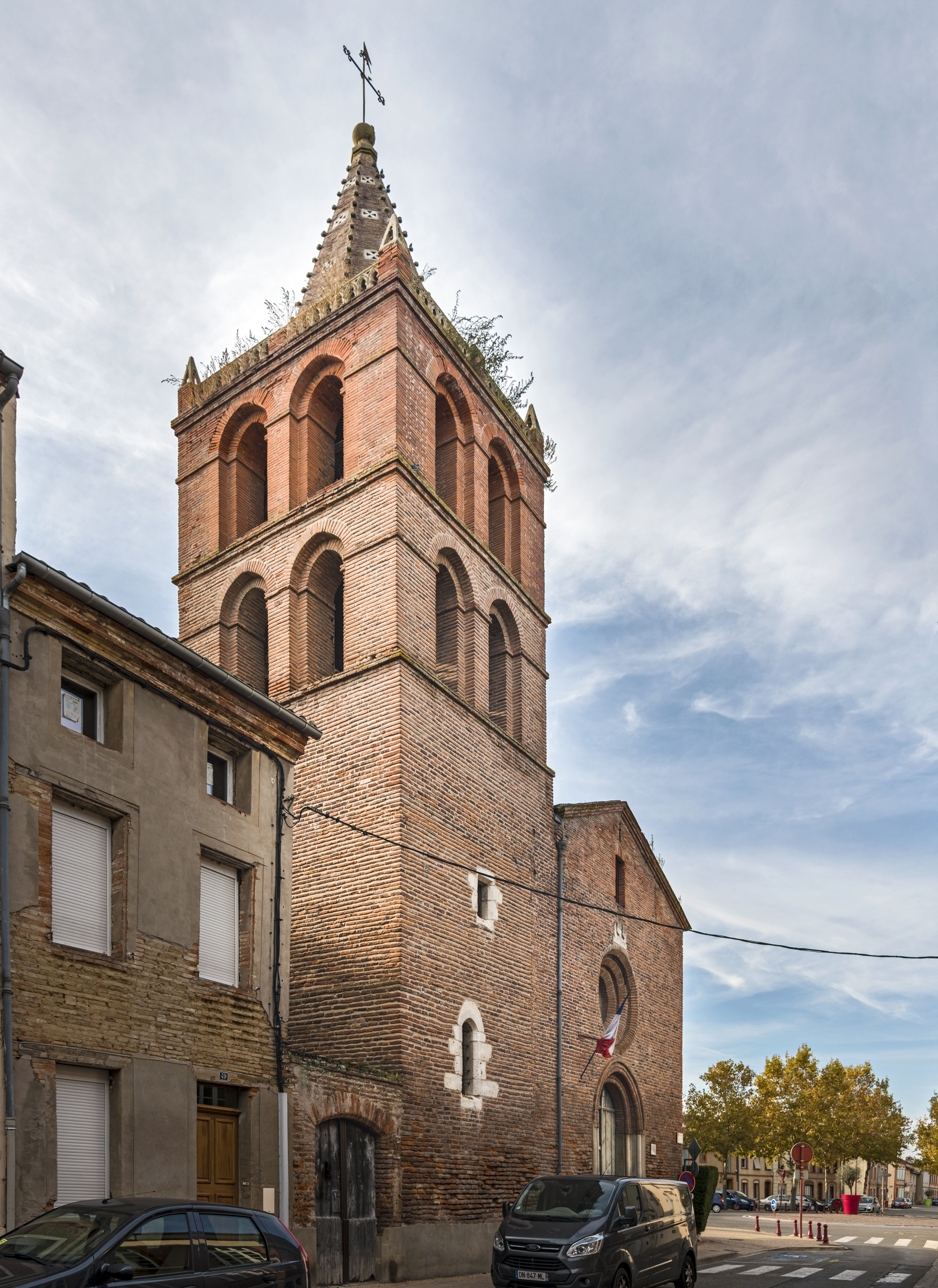
Saint-Jean Church - the bell tower

==== Chapel of Notre-Dame-d'Alem ====
The first document attesting to the existence of this chapel dates from June 7, 1210. Notre-Dame-d’Alem has always been renowned. For a long time, the chapel attracted pilgrims passing through Toulouse and Moissac. Destroyed three times (during the Hundred Years' War, the Wars of Religion, and the French Revolution of 1789), it still stands today.

It owes two of its resurrections to two "miracles":

- the vow of Sancerre during the Hundred Years' War. Marshal Louis de Sancerre, taking refuge in the ruins of the chapel, implored the Virgin Mary and promised to rebuild it if he won the war;
- the vow of Galatoire of Spain during the French Revolution. Imprisoned in the Convent of the Visitation, this nobleman, a relative of émigrés, promised to rebuild the chapel if he escaped the guillotine.

==== The city's former religious establishments ====
Castelsarrasin had five religious establishments. Two of them were destroyed during the French Revolution:

- the Dominican convent (1602–1792) on the site of the current music school and media library, of which no trace remains;
- the Capuchin monastery (1602–1793), of which no trace remains;
- the Carmelite monastery (1282–1794) on the site of the current town hall, the former courthouse, and the former gendarmerie.

Remains:
16th-century brick bell tower, hexagonal at its base and heptagonal in its two upper stories.
The church portal, dating from the late 13th century, is a semicircular arch framed by a long pointed arch with three moldings.

- The Ursuline convent (1642–1792) on the site of the current sub-prefecture.

Remains:
Interior: A cloister gallery, vaulted rooms
Exterior: A corner tower.

- The Priory of Saint John (1282–1789) on the site of the convent and chapel of the Sisters of Compassion.

==== The town hall ====
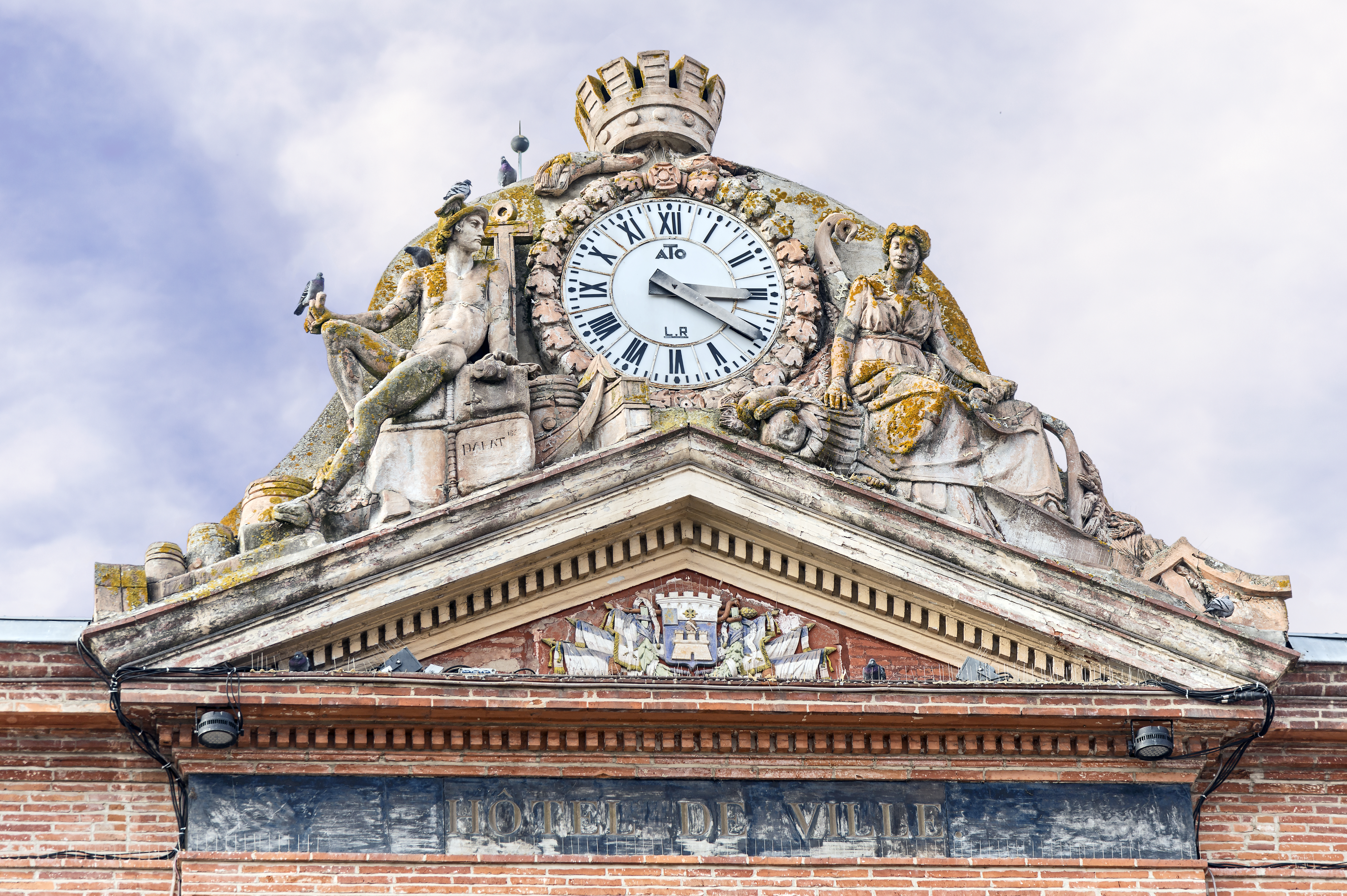
The Lepaute clock on the pediment of the town hall with the statues of Minerva and Ceres.

It is located in Place de la Liberté. It was built by the architect Rivet in 1827 and has an illuminated clock made by the Lepaute company in Paris, in 1847; this clock is framed by the statues of Minerva (commerce) and Ceres (agriculture), the work of the Toulouse sculptor Palat.

==== Jacques-Yves-Cousteau Port ====
The Jacques-Yves-Cousteau marina was established in 1997 along the Allée de Verdun in downtown Castelsarrasin. Initially offering around fifteen berths, the marina has been expanded over the years, increasing the number of berths to 40. In 2016, further expansion work along the Square Aristide-Briand and the Rue de la Passerelle increased the marina's capacity to 65 berths. With the simultaneous construction of a river technical center offering 140 berths, located near the marina, this port has become one of the main marinas on the Garonne Canal and a major tourist attraction in Castelsarrasin.

==== Civil monuments ====
Several buildings or streets are worth visiting:

- Renaissance House (Place de la Liberté), privately owned.

Built in the late 15th/early 16th century. Listed as a historical monument. Renaissance windows. Sculptures on the corbels and window supports: animals and foliage.

- Italian House or Spanish House, built for the Spanish royal family in the 17th century and listed as a historical monument. Long neglected and with its tower destroyed in 1958, its facade was restored and its tower rebuilt in 2010–2011.
- Hôtel Marceillac, 54 Rue de l'Égalité. Hotel built between 1909 and 1912 by the architect Antonin Maurou. Listed as a historical monument.

Hôtel Lamothe-Cadillac (No. 6 Place Lamothe-Cadillac), privately owned.
Known as the "Governors' House," Antoine de Lamothe-Cadillac, founder of Detroit, lived here from 1723 to 1730. 18th-century facade, 17th-century inner courtyard. Commemorative plaque.

- House of the Abbot of Prades (9, rue du Commandant Châtinières, private). Birthplace of Abbot Jean-Martin de Prades, contributor to the Encyclopedia. 18th-century construction. Sculptures on the portal: mask and garlands. Commemorative plaque.
- Half-timbered house (49, rue de la Révolution, private). 16th-century construction. Timber-framed facade.
- Rue de la Discrétion. Typical of the Middle Ages. Mullioned windows from the early 16th century.
- Rue de la Solitude. Typical of the Middle Ages.
- War memorial, Aristide-Briand Square, work by the Toulouse sculptor Paul Ducuing, 1920.
- Clairefont Park: this park is a popular spot for city residents, especially when the weather is nice.
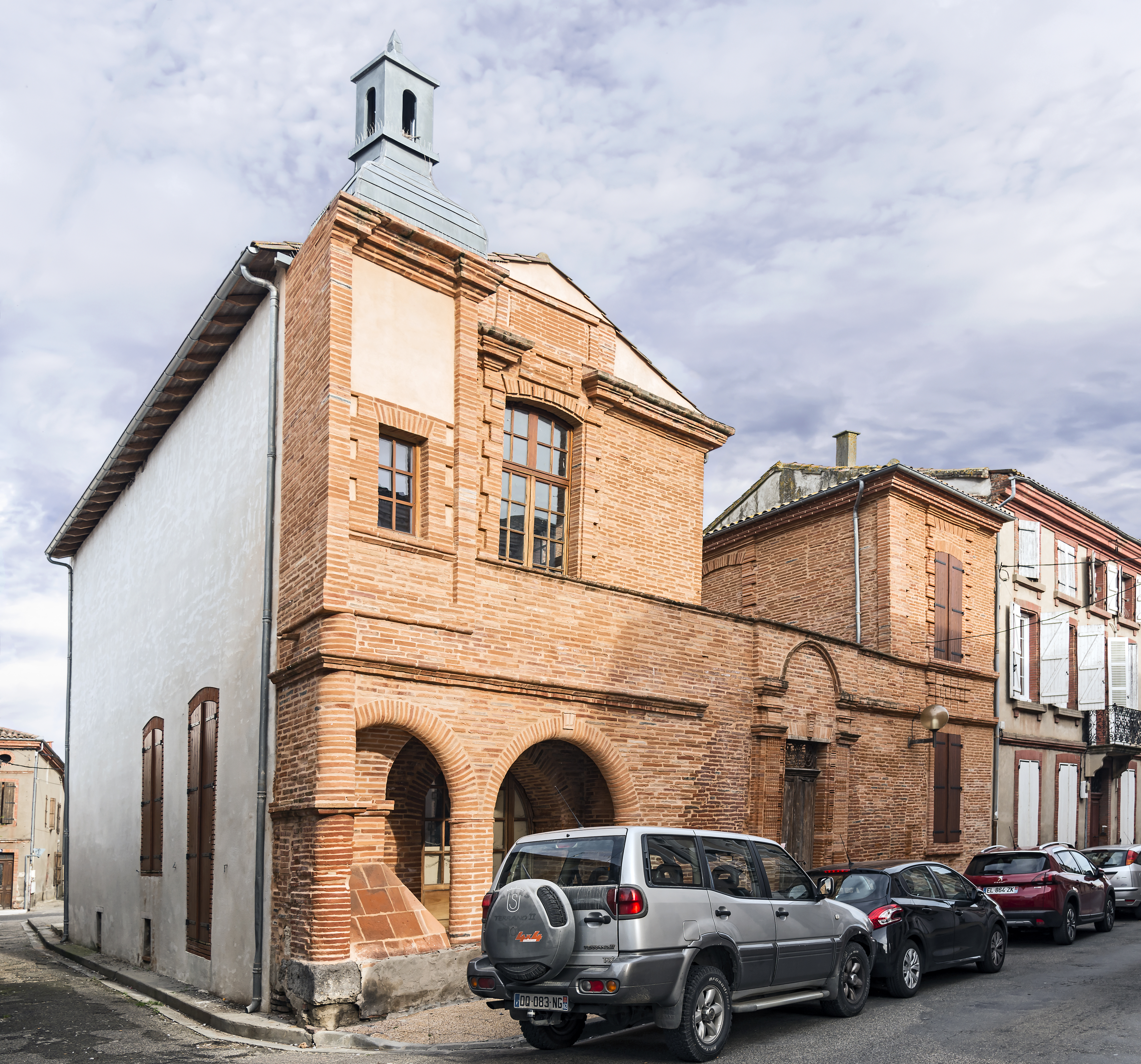
Italian house

Facade of the Marceillac hotel

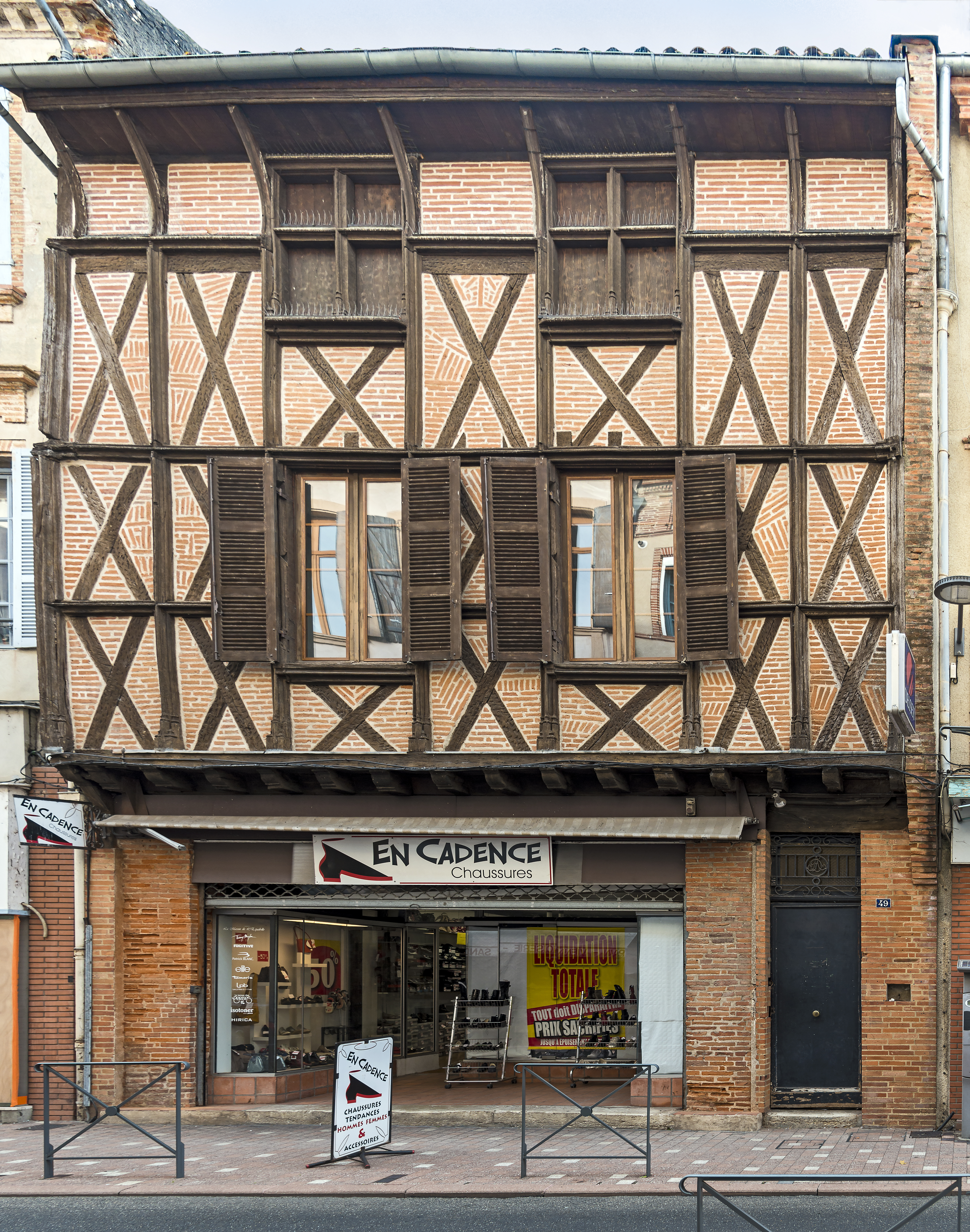
Half-timbered house

=== Castelsarrasin and the cinema ===
- The film Voyance et Manigance by Éric Fourniols, starring Dieudonné, Emmanuelle Béart and Anémone, was largely filmed in Castelsarrasin.

=== Heraldry ===
Arms of Castelsarrasin	Azure, a castle with three silver towers, masoned sable, surmounted by a Moor's head sewn sable tied with silver, on a chief gules a crosslet clechée, voided and pommée of twelve gold pieces. These arms use the term "sewn" solely to contravene the rule of tincture: they are faulty (gules on azure). Heraldic conflict: the design does not feature a Moor's head.

== See also ==
- Communes of the Tarn-et-Garonne department
