= Castelsarrasin station =

Railway station in Occitanie, France

Coordinates: 44°02′25″N 1°06′57″E

Castelsarrasin
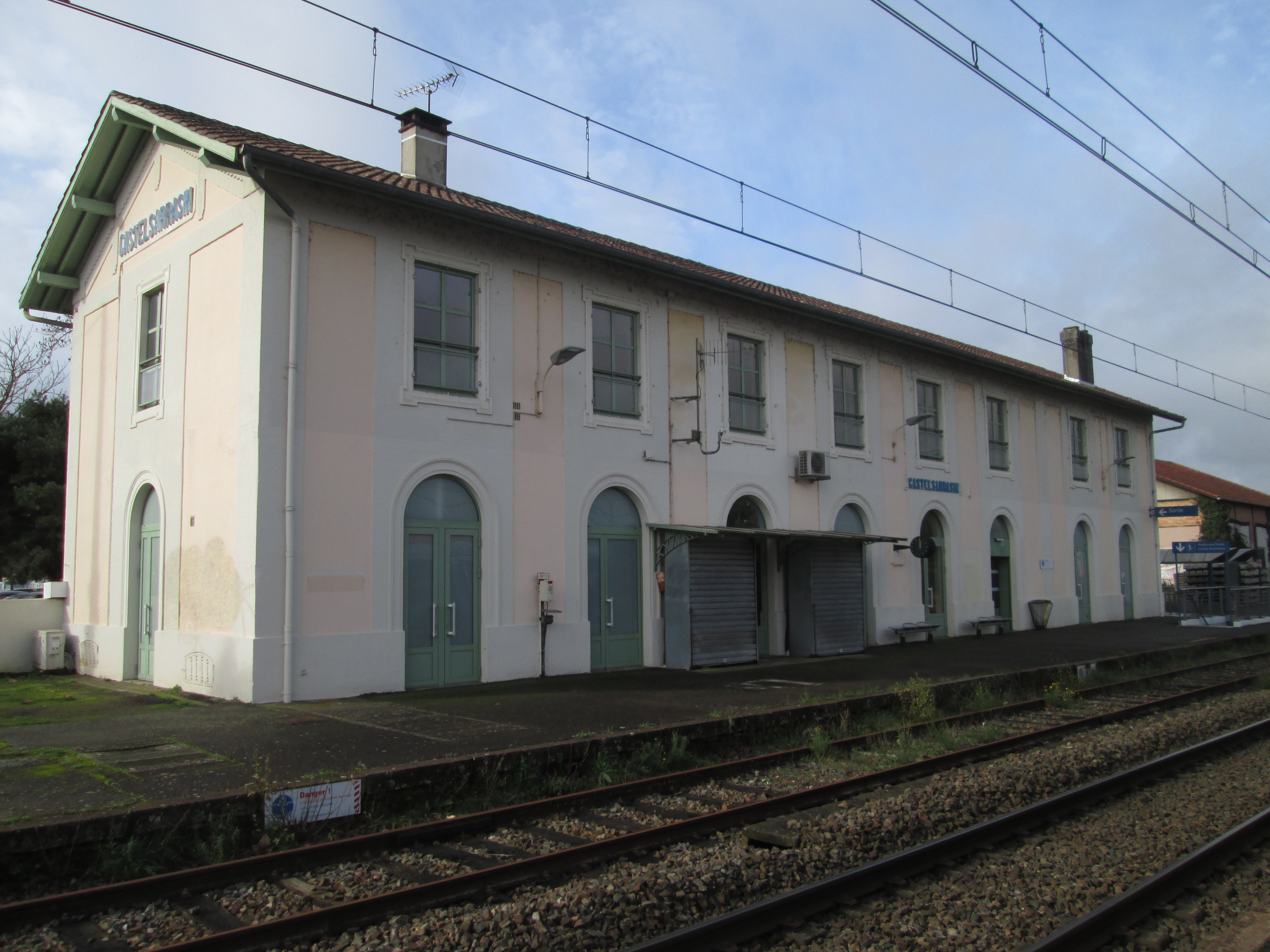
- The passenger building of Castelsarrasin seen from the platform.

General information
- Location: Castelsarrasin, Tarn-et-Garonne, Occitanie; France
- Line: Bordeaux–Sète railway
- Platforms: 3
- Tracks: 5

Other information
- Station code: 87611897

Services
Preceding station	TER Occitanie	Following station
Moissac towards Agen	18	La Ville-Dieu towards Toulouse
Location

Castelsarrasin is a railway station in Castelsarrasin, Occitanie, France. The station is on the Bordeaux–Sète railway. The station is served by TER (local) services operated by SNCF.

== Train services ==
The following services currently call at Castelsarrasin:

- local service (TER Occitanie) Agen–Montauban–Toulouse
