= Canton of Castelsarrasin =

Coordinates: 44.04°N 1.11°E

The canton of Castelsarrasin is an administrative division of the Tarn-et-Garonne department, in southern France. It was created at the French canton reorganisation which came into effect in March 2015. Its seat is in Castelsarrasin.

It consists of the following communes:

1. Barry-d'Islemade
2. Les Barthes
3. Castelsarrasin
4. Labastide-du-Temple
5. Meauzac
6. La Ville-Dieu-du-Temple
