= Moissac station =

Railway station in Moissac, France

Coordinates: 44°06′07″N 1°04′36″E

Moissac
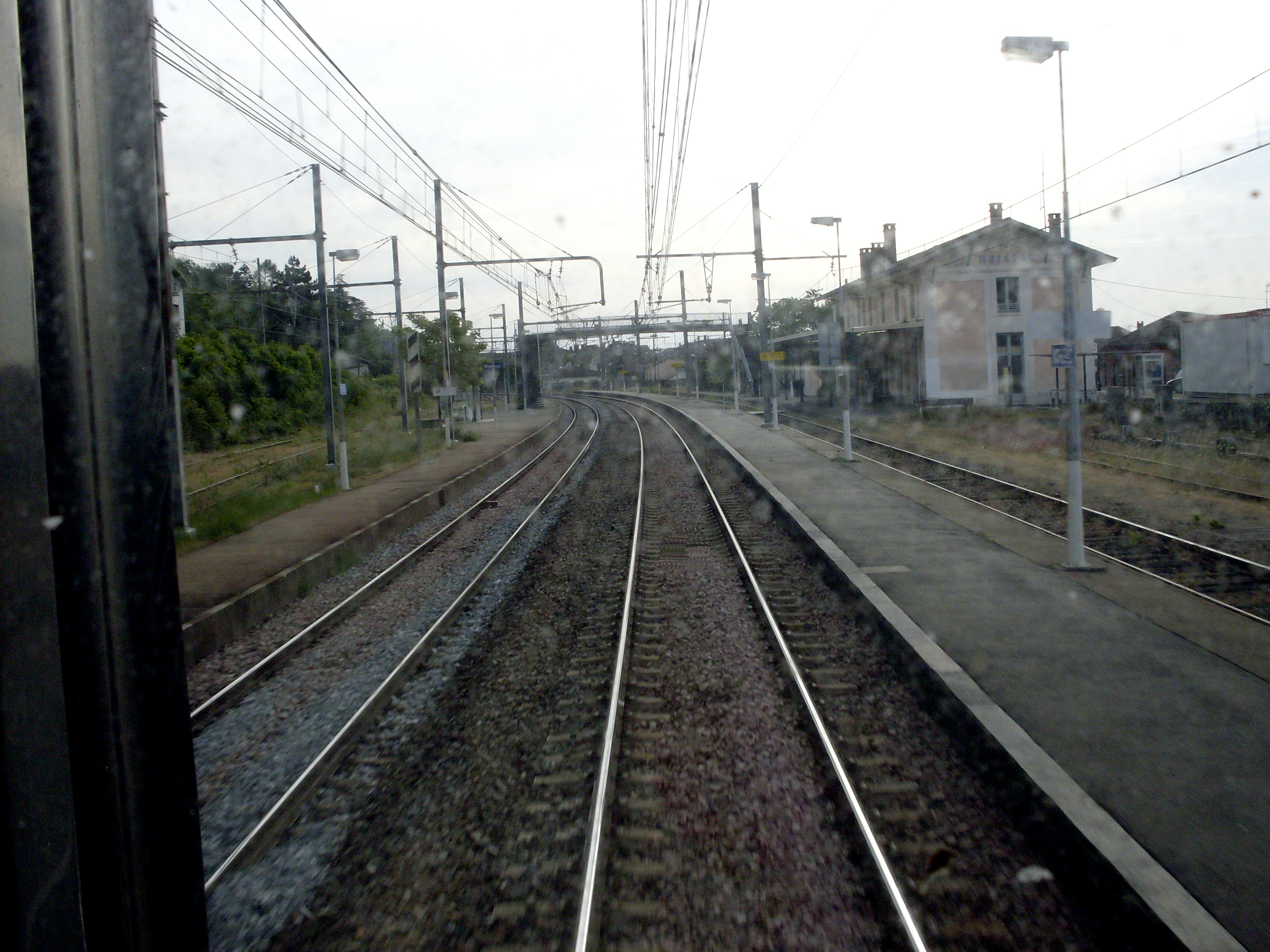

General information
- Location: Moissac, Tarn-et-Garonne, Occitanie; France
- Line: Bordeaux–Sète railway
- Platforms: 4
- Tracks: 4

Other information
- Station code: 87611889

Services
| Preceding station | TER Occitanie | Following station |
|---|---|---|
| Valence-d'Agen towards Agen | 18 | Castelsarrasin towards Toulouse |
Location

Moissac station (French: Gare de Moissac) is a railway station in Moissac, Occitanie, France. The station is on the Bordeaux–Sète railway. The station is served by TER (local) services operated by SNCF.

== Train services ==
The following services currently call at Moissac:

- local service (TER Occitanie) Agen–Montauban–Toulouse

== See also ==
- List of SNCF stations in Occitanie
