= Charles de Mazade =

French historian, journalist, and political editor

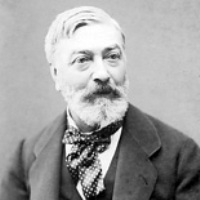
Louis Charles Jean Robert de Mazade

Louis Charles Jean Robert de Mazade (19 March 1820, to Castelsarrasin, Tarn-et-Garonne – 27 April 1893, Paris) was a French historian, journalist, and political editor of Revue des deux mondes. He was the third member elected to occupy seat 4 of the Académie française in 1882.

== Bibliography ==
- "Charles de Mazade (1820-1893)" (in French). Académie française. 2009. Archived from the original on 2008-11-18.
