= La Neuville-au-Temple =

- Commune
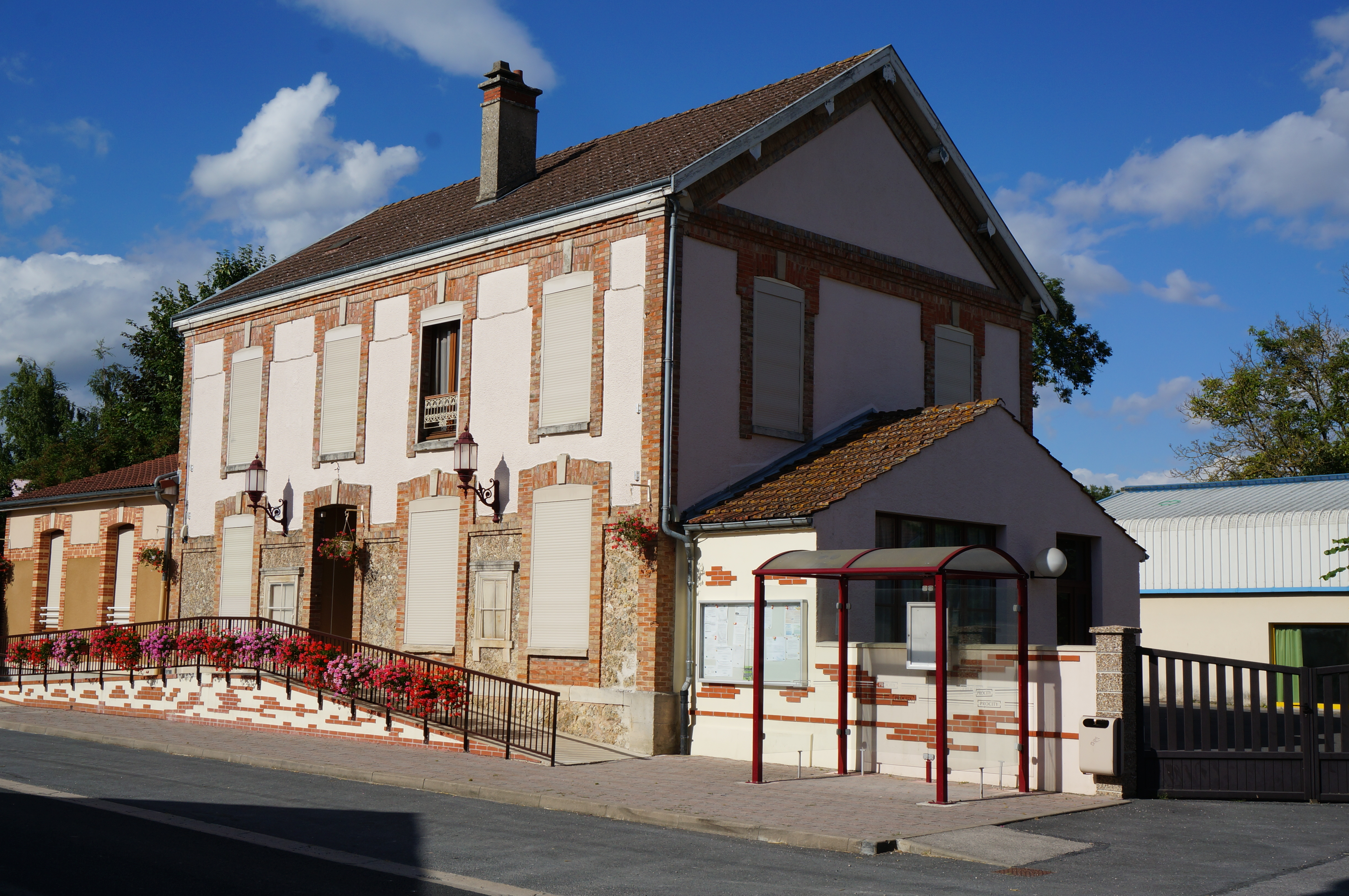
- The town hall in Saint-Hilaire-au-Temple
- Location of La Neuville-au-Temple
- Location within France Location within Grand Est
- Coordinates: 49°03′27″N 4°23′09″E
- Country: France
- Region: Grand Est
- Department: Marne
- Arrondissement: Châlons-en-Champagne
- Canton: Mourmelon-Vesle et Monts de Champagne
- Intercommunality: CA Châlons-en-Champagne

Government
  - Mayor (2025–2026): Lionel Joppé
- Area^{1}: 16.41 km^{2} (6.34 sq mi)
- Highest elevation: 151 m (495 ft)
- Lowest elevation: 113 m (371 ft)
- Population (2023): 579
  - Density: 35.3/km^{2} (91.4/sq mi)
- Time zone: UTC+01:00 (CET)
  - Summer (DST): UTC+02:00 (CEST)
- INSEE/Postal code: 51485 /51400
- ^{1} French Land Register data, which excludes lakes, ponds, glaciers > 1 km^{2} (0.386 sq mi or 247 acres) and river estuaries.

La Neuville-au-Temple (French pronunciation: [la nøvil o tɑ̃pl]) is a commune in the Marne department in north-eastern France. It was formed on 1 January 2025, with the merger of Saint-Hilaire-au-Temple and Dampierre-au-Temple.

== See also ==
- Communes of the Marne department
