= La Ville-Dieu station =

Railway station in La Ville-Dieu-du-Temple, France

Coordinates: 44°02′08″N 1°13′01″E

La Ville-Dieu-du-Temple

General information
- Location: La Ville-Dieu-du-Temple; Tarn-et-Garonne, Occitanie; France
- Line: Bordeaux–Sète railway
- Platforms: 3
- Tracks: 5

Other information
- Station code: 87611459

Services
Preceding station	TER Occitanie	Following station
Castelsarrasin towards Agen	18	Montauban towards Toulouse
Location

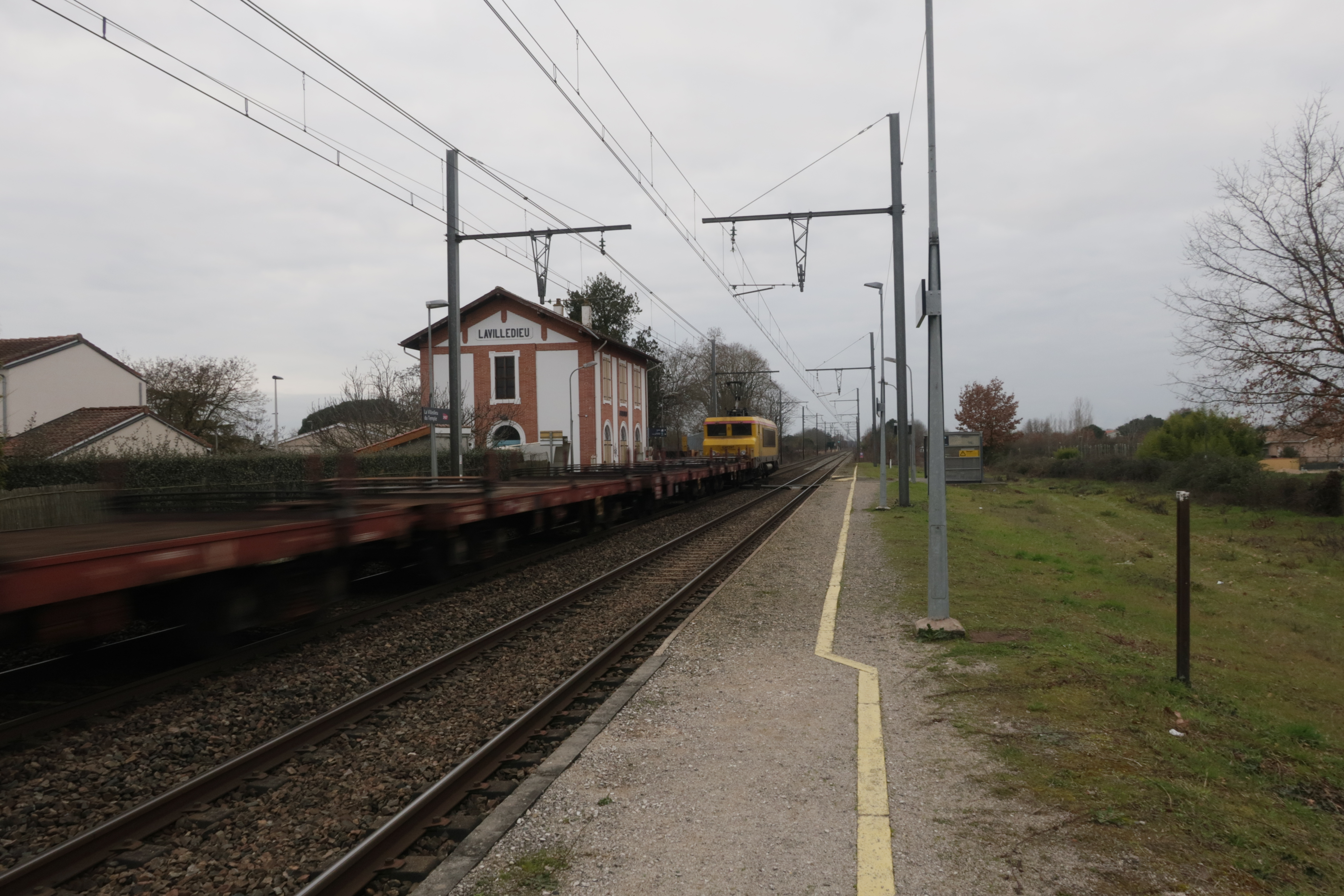
View of the passenger building of La Ville-Dieu-du-Temple station from platform n°1

La Ville-Dieu is a railway station in La Ville-Dieu-du-Temple, Occitanie, France. The station is on the Bordeaux–Sète railway. The station is served by TER (local) services operated by SNCF.

== Train services ==
The following services currently call at La Ville-Dieu:

- local service (TER Occitanie) Agen–Montauban–Toulouse
