= Dampierre-au-Temple =

- Part of La Neuville-au-Temple
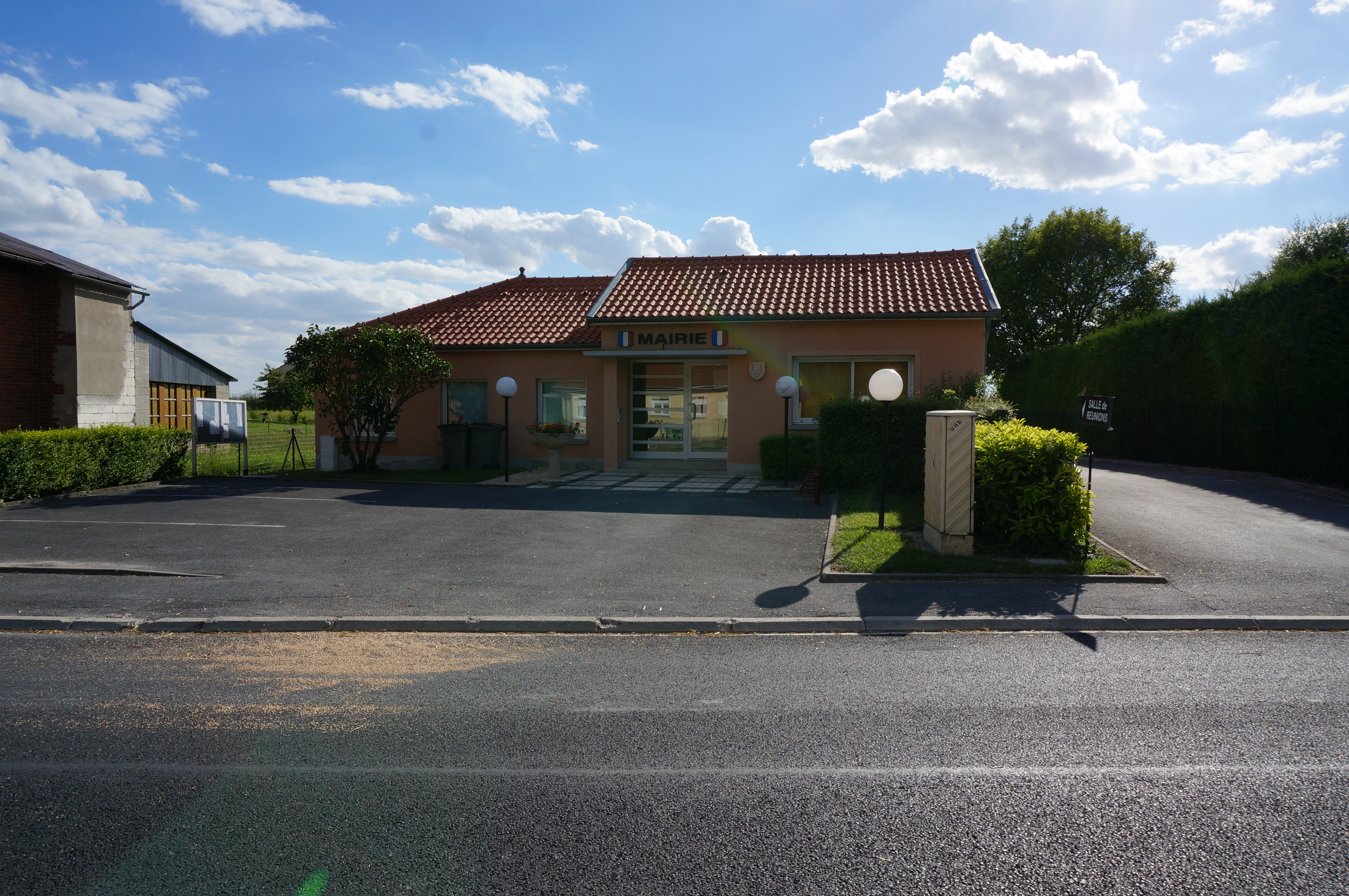
- The town hall in Dampierre-au-Temple
- Location of Dampierre-au-Temple
- Location within France Location within Grand Est
- Coordinates: 49°02′55″N 4°23′25″E
- Country: France
- Region: Grand Est
- Department: Marne
- Arrondissement: Châlons-en-Champagne
- Canton: Mourmelon-Vesle et Monts de Champagne
- Commune: La Neuville-au-Temple
- Area^{1}: 10.26 km^{2} (3.96 sq mi)
- Elevation: 123 m (404 ft)
- Population (2022): 270
  - Density: 26/km^{2} (68/sq mi)
- Time zone: UTC+01:00 (CET)
  - Summer (DST): UTC+02:00 (CEST)
- Postal code: 51400
- ^{1} French Land Register data, which excludes lakes, ponds, glaciers > 1 km^{2} (0.386 sq mi or 247 acres) and river estuaries.

Dampierre-au-Temple (French pronunciation: [dɑ̃pjɛʁ o tɑ̃pl]) is a former commune in the Marne department in north-eastern France. On 1 January 2025, it was merged into the new commune of La Neuville-au-Temple.

== See also ==
- Communes of the Marne department
