= Barry-d'Islemade =

- Commune
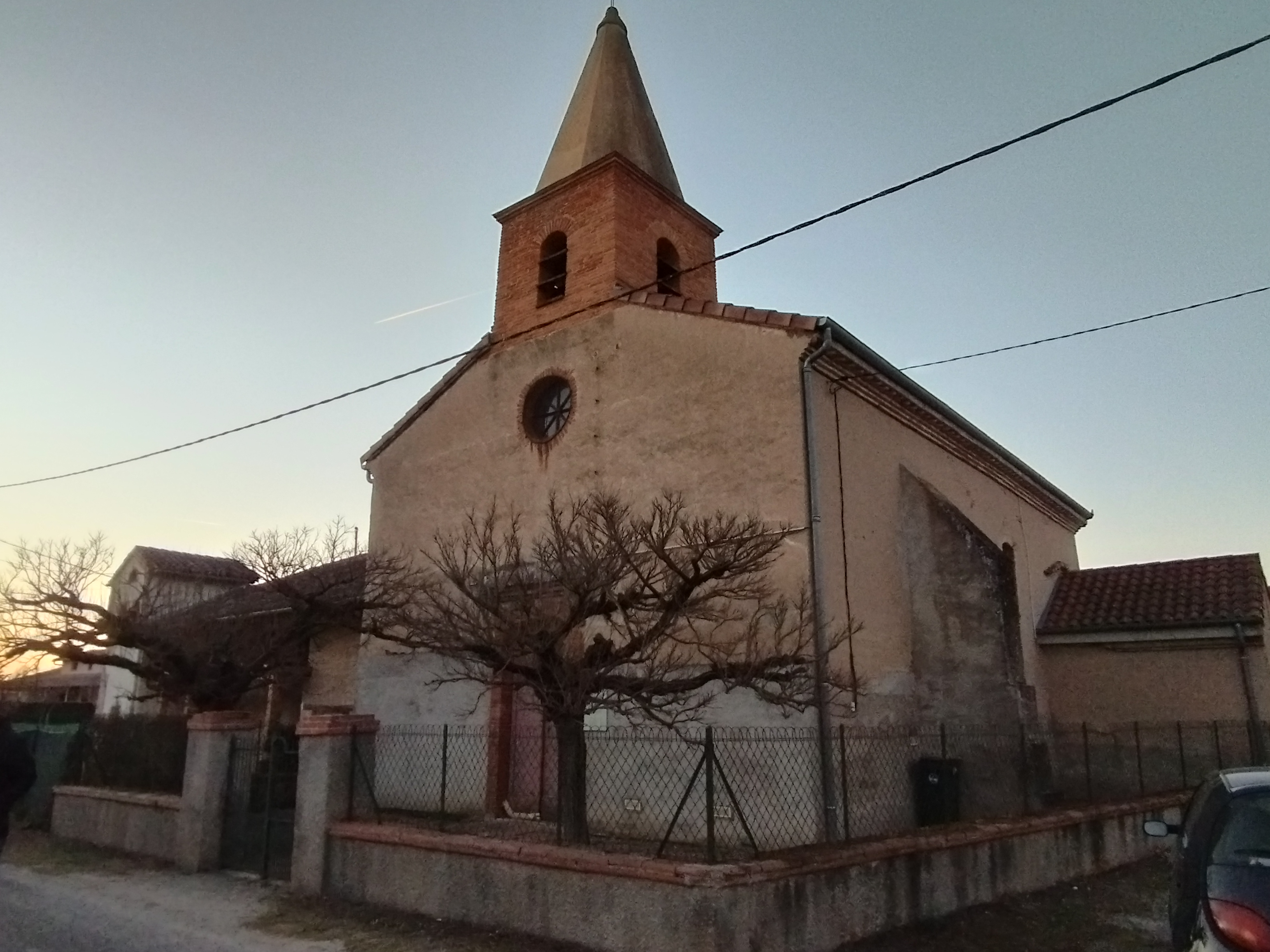
- Location of Barry-d'Islemade
- Location within France Location within Occitanie
- Coordinates: 44°04′36″N 1°14′45″E
- Country: France
- Region: Occitania
- Department: Tarn-et-Garonne
- Arrondissement: Castelsarrasin
- Canton: Castelsarrasin
- Intercommunality: CC du Pays de Lafrançaise

Government
  - Mayor (2020–2026): Guy Portal
- Area^{1}: 11.35 km^{2} (4.38 sq mi)
- Elevation: 90 m (300 ft)
- Highest elevation: 95 m (312 ft)
- Lowest elevation: 73 m (240 ft)
- Population (2023): 940
  - Density: 83/km^{2} (210/sq mi)
- Time zone: UTC+01:00 (CET)
  - Summer (DST): UTC+02:00 (CEST)
- INSEE/Postal code: 82011 /82290
- ^{1} French Land Register data, which excludes lakes, ponds, glaciers > 1 km^{2} (0.386 sq mi or 247 acres) and river estuaries.

Barry-d'Islemade (French pronunciation: [baʁi dilmad]; Occitan: Lo Barri d'Ilamada) is a commune in the Tarn-et-Garonne department in the Occitanie region in southern France.

== See also ==
- Communes of the Tarn-et-Garonne department
