= Castelferrus =

- Commune
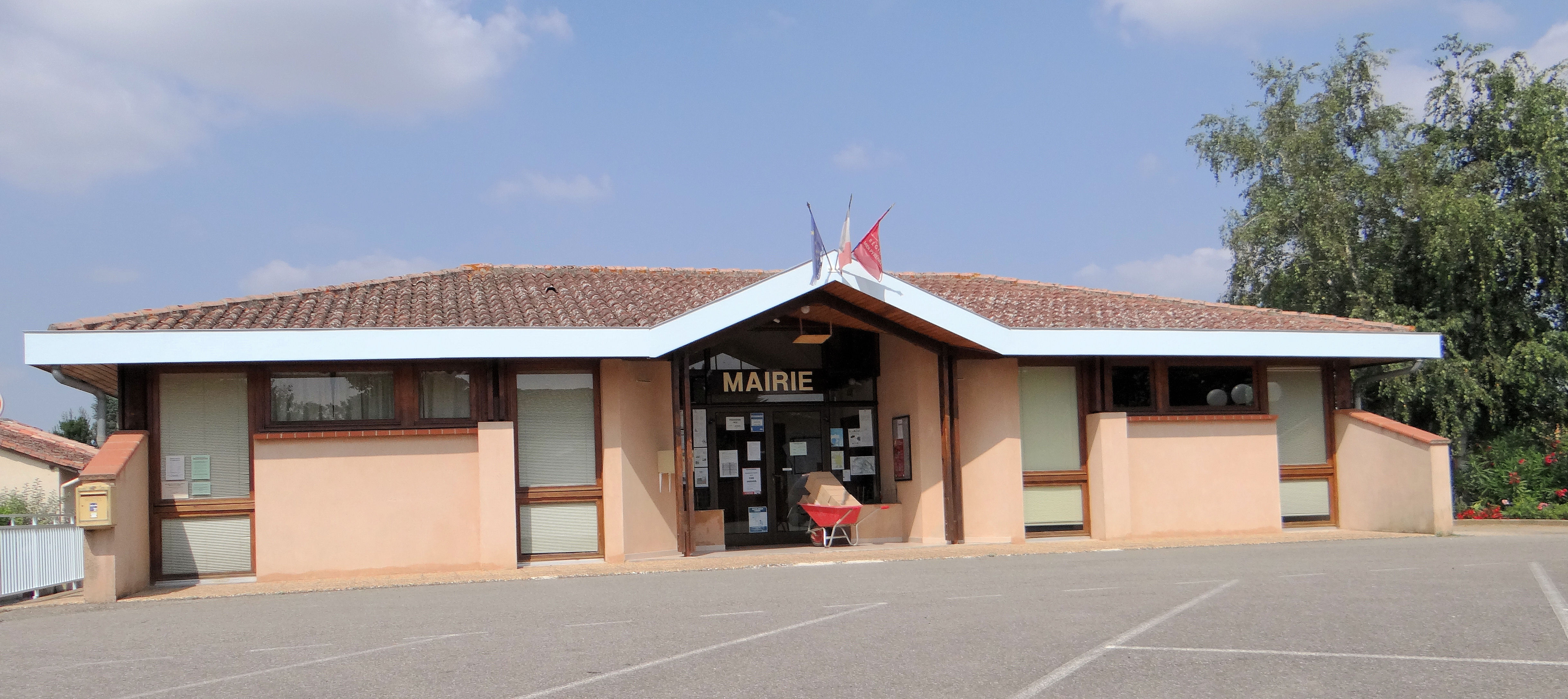
- The town hall of Castelferrus
- Location of Castelferrus
- Location within France Location within Occitanie
- Coordinates: 44°00′37″N 1°05′18″E
- Country: France
- Region: Occitania
- Department: Tarn-et-Garonne
- Arrondissement: Castelsarrasin
- Canton: Beaumont-de-Lomagne

Government
  - Mayor (2020–2026): Guy Dupuy
- Area^{1}: 8.39 km^{2} (3.24 sq mi)
- Elevation: 83 m (272 ft)
- Highest elevation: 145 m (476 ft)
- Lowest elevation: 68 m (223 ft)
- Population (2023): 488
  - Density: 58.2/km^{2} (151/sq mi)
- Time zone: UTC+01:00 (CET)
  - Summer (DST): UTC+02:00 (CEST)
- INSEE/Postal code: 82030 /82100
- ^{1} French Land Register data, which excludes lakes, ponds, glaciers > 1 km^{2} (0.386 sq mi or 247 acres) and river estuaries.

Castelferrus (French pronunciation: [kastɛlfɛʁys]; Occitan: Castèlferrús) is a commune in the Tarn-et-Garonne department in the Occitanie region in southern France.

== Heraldry ==
Arms of Castellferrus	English: Half-cut to senestra party: at 1 from sinople to the Clock Tower of the place of money, the angle of the masonry walls of mouths, at 2 from mouths to the keyed cross, emptied and covered with twelve gold pieces, at 3 silver to two bandages waving azure

== See also ==
- Communes of the Tarn-et-Garonne department
