= Meauzac =

- Commune
- Coat of arms
- Location of Meauzac
- Location within France Location within Occitanie
- Coordinates: 44°05′22″N 1°14′24″E
- Country: France
- Region: Occitania
- Department: Tarn-et-Garonne
- Arrondissement: Castelsarrasin
- Canton: Castelsarrasin
- Intercommunality: CC du Pays de Lafrançaise

Government
  - Mayor (2020–2026): José Lacombe
- Area^{1}: 11.77 km^{2} (4.54 sq mi)
- Elevation: 76 m (249 ft)
- Highest elevation: 88 m (289 ft)
- Lowest elevation: 67 m (220 ft)
- Population (2023): 1,504
  - Density: 127.8/km^{2} (331.0/sq mi)
- Time zone: UTC+01:00 (CET)
  - Summer (DST): UTC+02:00 (CEST)
- INSEE/Postal code: 82108 /82290
- ^{1} French Land Register data, which excludes lakes, ponds, glaciers > 1 km^{2} (0.386 sq mi or 247 acres) and river estuaries.

Meauzac (French pronunciation: [mozak]; Occitan: Meusac) is a commune in the Tarn-et-Garonne department in the Occitanie region in southern France.

== History ==
Meauzac has a vivid history spanning from the Roman era to the modern day. It started out when a Gallo-Roman villa was built up, and villagers were attracted to the area due to the fertility of the area, being next to the Tarn river. The village was pillaged around the year 407 CE.

In May 1369, the English arrived at Meauzac and besieged the castle. After negotiations took place, Meauzac decreed it would pledge allegiance to the Prince of Wales as its Lord. Upon this decision, the English left 40 men-at-arms and 20 archers, who defended the town for 20 years.

== See also ==
- Communes of the Tarn-et-Garonne department
