= La Ville-Dieu-du-Temple =

- Commune
- Coat of arms
- Location of La Ville-Dieu-du-Temple
- Location within France Location within Occitanie
- Coordinates: 44°02′09″N 1°13′05″E
- Country: France
- Region: Occitania
- Department: Tarn-et-Garonne
- Arrondissement: Montauban
- Canton: Castelsarrasin

Government
  - Mayor (2020–2026): Dominique Briois
- Area^{1}: 26.16 km^{2} (10.10 sq mi)
- Elevation: 86 m (282 ft)
- Highest elevation: 105 m (344 ft)
- Lowest elevation: 83 m (272 ft)
- Population (2023): 3,358
  - Density: 128.4/km^{2} (332.5/sq mi)
- Time zone: UTC+01:00 (CET)
  - Summer (DST): UTC+02:00 (CEST)
- INSEE/Postal code: 82096 /82290
- ^{1} French Land Register data, which excludes lakes, ponds, glaciers > 1 km^{2} (0.386 sq mi or 247 acres) and river estuaries.

La Ville-Dieu-du-Temple (French pronunciation: [la vil djø dy tɑ̃pl]; Occitan: La Vila Dieu del Temple) is a commune in the Tarn-et-Garonne department in the Occitanie region in southern France. It is served by La Ville-Dieu station on the Bordeaux-Toulouse line.

== Population ==
Historical population
| Year | Pop. | ±% p.a. |
|---|---|---|
| 1968 | 1,158 | — |
| 1975 | 1,236 | +0.94% |
| 1982 | 1,362 | +1.40% |
| 1990 | 1,656 | +2.47% |
| 1999 | 1,744 | +0.58% |
| 2007 | 2,415 | +4.15% |
| 2012 | 3,052 | +4.79% |
| 2017 | 3,191 | +0.89% |
| 2023 | 3,358 | +0.85% |
Source: INSEE

== See also ==
- Communes of the Tarn-et-Garonne department
