= Les Barthes =

- Commune
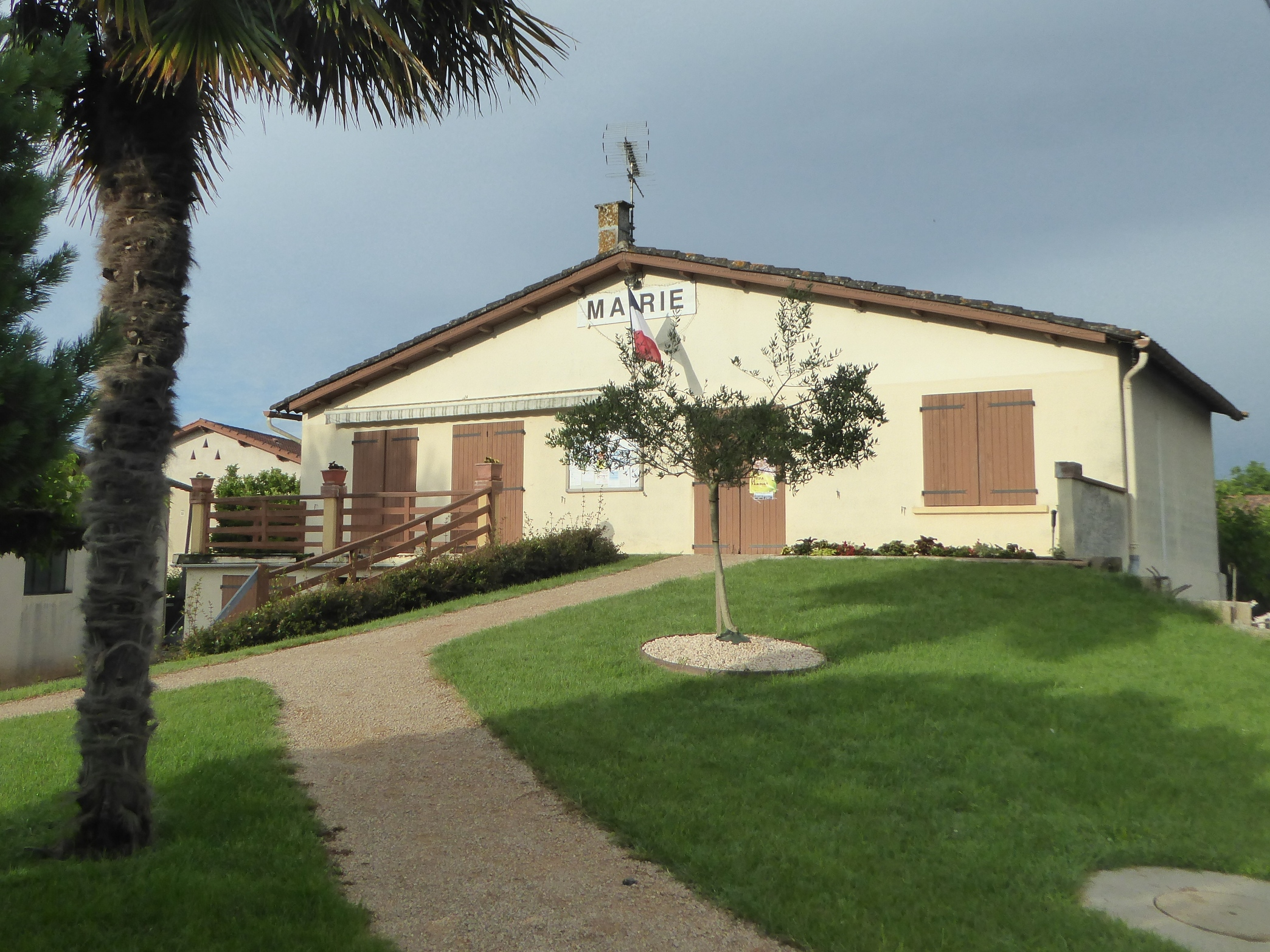

- Coat of arms
- Location of Les Barthes
- Location within France Location within Occitanie
- Coordinates: 44°05′51″N 1°10′15″E
- Country: France
- Region: Occitania
- Department: Tarn-et-Garonne
- Arrondissement: Castelsarrasin
- Canton: Castelsarrasin
- Intercommunality: CC du Pays de Lafrançaise

Government
  - Mayor (2020–2026): Jean-Marc Miramont
- Area^{1}: 8.2 km^{2} (3.2 sq mi)
- Elevation: 87 m (285 ft)
- Highest elevation: 91 m (299 ft)
- Lowest elevation: 62 m (203 ft)
- Population (2023): 596
  - Density: 73/km^{2} (190/sq mi)
- Time zone: UTC+01:00 (CET)
  - Summer (DST): UTC+02:00 (CEST)
- INSEE/Postal code: 82012 /82100
- ^{1} French Land Register data, which excludes lakes, ponds, glaciers > 1 km^{2} (0.386 sq mi or 247 acres) and river estuaries.

Les Barthes (French pronunciation: [le baʁt]; Occitan: Las Bartas) is a commune in the Tarn-et-Garonne department in the Occitanie region in southern France.

== See also ==
- Communes of the Tarn-et-Garonne department
