= Labastide-du-Temple =

Labastide-du-Temple La Bastida del Temple (Occitan)
- Commune
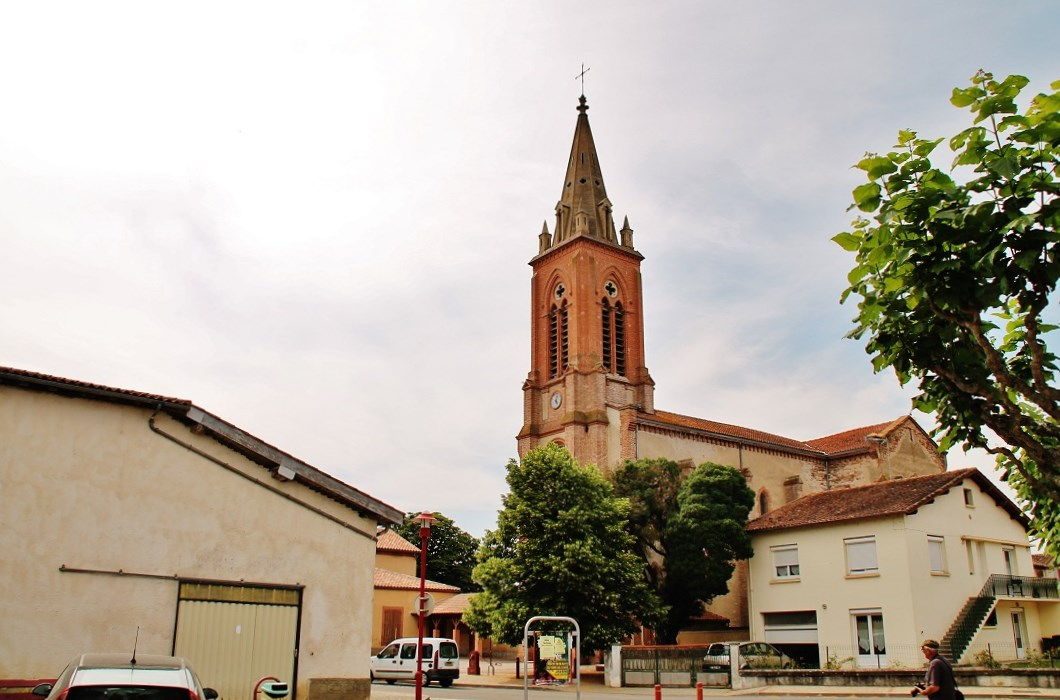
- Église Saint-Christophe

- Coat of arms
- Location of Labastide-du-Temple
- Location within France Location within Occitanie
- Coordinates: 44°05′09″N 1°11′45″E
- Country: France
- Region: Occitania
- Department: Tarn-et-Garonne
- Arrondissement: Castelsarrasin
- Canton: Castelsarrasin
- Intercommunality: CC du Pays de Lafrançaise

Government
  - Mayor (2022–2026): Mathieu Pierasco
- Area^{1}: 10.92 km^{2} (4.22 sq mi)
- Elevation: 80 m (260 ft)
- Highest elevation: 94 m (308 ft)
- Lowest elevation: 69 m (226 ft)
- Population (2023): 1,132
  - Density: 103.7/km^{2} (268.5/sq mi)
- Time zone: UTC+01:00 (CET)
  - Summer (DST): UTC+02:00 (CEST)
- INSEE/Postal code: 82080 /82100
- ^{1} French Land Register data, which excludes lakes, ponds, glaciers > 1 km^{2} (0.386 sq mi or 247 acres) and river estuaries.

Labastide-du-Temple (French pronunciation: [labastid dy tɑ̃pl]; Occitan: La Bastida del Temple) is a commune in the Tarn-et-Garonne department in the Occitania region in Southern France. As of 2023, the population of the commune was 1,132.

== See also ==
- Communes of the Tarn-et-Garonne department
